= Vito Bertoldo =

United States Army Medal of Honor recipient (1916–1966)

Vito R. Bertoldo
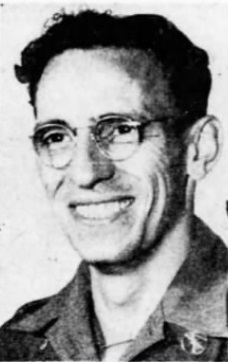
- From The Decatur Review, October 18, 1945
- Born: December 1, 1916; Decatur, Illinois, US
- Died: July 23, 1966 (aged 49); Martinez, California, US
- Burial place: Golden Gate National Cemetery
- Military career
- Allegiance: United States
- Branch: United States Army
- Service years: 1942–1946
- Rank: Master Sergeant
- Units: 242nd Infantry Regiment, 42nd Infantry Division
- Conflicts: World War II: Operation Nordwind
- Awards: Medal of Honor
- Other work: Contact representative, U.S. Veterans Administration; Owner, landscaping business

Vito Rocco Bertoldo (December 1, 1916 – July 23, 1966) was a United States Army soldier. A veteran of World War II, he was a recipient of the Medal of Honor for his actions near Hatten, France, in January 1945.

Bertoldo was born and raised in Decatur, Illinois, and worked as a coal miner and truck driver. Though he was exempt from the World War II draft because of poor eyesight, he enlisted in the U.S. Army in 1942, and was approved for limited duty in the United States as a military policeman. He then obtained approval to undergo training as an infantryman, and deployed to France with the 42nd Infantry Division. During Germany's Operation Nordwind offensive of December 1944-January 1945, Bertoldo was one of the soldiers assigned to guard the command post (CP) for 1st Battalion, 242nd Infantry Regiment. When the battalion staff moved to an alternate location while expecting a German attack, Bertoldo volunteered to cover them and defend the CP. On January 9 and 10, 1945, he single-handedly fought off German assaults on the command post, and then continued the fight by taking part in the defense of the battalion's alternate CP. After the war, he received the Medal of Honor for his heroism during this action.

Following his military service, Bertoldo moved to California and worked as a contact representative for the U.S. Veterans Administration before becoming the owner and operator of a successful landscaping business. He was diagnosed with cancer in 1966 and died at the VA hospital in Martinez, California. Bertoldo was buried at Golden Gate National Cemetery in San Bruno, California.

== Early life ==
Vito Rocco Bertoldo was born in Decatur, Illinois on December 1, 1916, the son of Rocco B. Bertoldo and Mary (Antonacci) Bertoldo. He was educated in the parochial and public schools of Decatur. He then worked as a coal miner, and was later employed as a truck driver for Oakes Products, which manufactured automobile parts before converting to munitions production during World War II.

== Military service ==
Bertoldo was ineligible for the World War II draft because of poor eyesight. He decided to enlist despite his draft exemption, and joined the Army in 1942. Approved for limited duty as a military policeman in the United States, Bertoldo talked his way into training as an infantryman, and was assigned as a cook with Company A, 1st Battalion, 242nd Infantry Regiment, 42nd Infantry Division.

Bertoldo's regiment took part in combat in France and he had attained the rank of private first class by January 1945. According to a 1995 letter by Bertoldo's company commander, William Corson, Company A's only discipline problem was Bertoldo, who did not get along with the company mess sergeant. As a result, when his battalion headquarters requested three soldiers per company to stand guard duty at the 1st Battalion command post (CP) during the German Operation Nordwind offensive in December 1944 and January 1945, Corson included Bertoldo in his company's contingent.

=== Medal of Honor action ===
On January 9, 1945, Bertoldo was on duty at the entrance to the battalion CP near Hatten, France, when German troops began shelling the town. The battalion staff withdrew, and Bertoldo volunteered to provide rearguard defense as they moved to an alternate location. On his own initiative, and while under fire, he mounted a machine gun at the CP's entrance, enabling him to cover the main approach. He held his fire as German tanks shelled the building, then fired at the advancing infantry that followed.

By the early morning of January 10, Bertoldo had moved to the alternate command post, which he defended against a continued assault by German troops, firing a machine gun and exposing himself to enemy fire to throw hand grenades. When German troops began firing a self-propelled 88-millimeter gun directly into the room from which Bertoldo was shooting, the concussion from the third round knocked him across the room and left him dazed. After ensuring that his assistant gunner had not been killed, he returned to his machine gun and continued the fight. He continued to fight as the battalion staff withdrew from the alternate command post, and did not withdraw himself until everyone else had moved to safety.

=== Medal of Honor citation ===
Bertoldo's official Medal of Honor citation reads:

He fought with extreme gallantry while guarding 2 command posts against the assault of powerful infantry and armored forces which had overrun the battalion's main line of resistance. On the close approach of enemy soldiers, he left the protection of the building he defended and set up his gun in the street, there to remain for almost 12 hours driving back attacks while in full view of his adversaries and completely exposed to 88-mm., machinegun and small-arms fire. He moved back inside the command post, strapped his machinegun to a table and covered the main approach to the building by firing through a window, remaining steadfast even in the face of 88-mm. fire from tanks only 75 yards away. One shell blasted him across the room, but he returned to his weapon. When 2 enemy armored personnel carriers led by a tank moved toward his position, he calmly waited for the troops to dismount and then, with the tank firing directly at him, leaned out of the window and mowed down the entire group of more than 20 Germans. Some time later, removal of the command post to another building was ordered. M/Sgt. Bertoldo voluntarily remained behind, covering the withdrawal of his comrades and maintaining his stand all night. In the morning he carried his machinegun to an adjacent building used as the command post of another battalion and began a day-long defense of that position. He broke up a heavy attack, launched by a self-propelled 88-mm. gun covered by a tank and about 15 infantrymen. Soon afterward another 88-mm. weapon moved up to within a few feet of his position, and, placing the muzzle of its gun almost inside the building, fired into the room, knocking him down and seriously wounding others. An American bazooka team set the German weapon afire, and M/Sgt. Bertoldo went back to his machinegun dazed as he was and killed several of the hostile troops as they attempted to withdraw. It was decided to evacuate the command post under the cover of darkness, but before the plan could be put into operation the enemy began an intensive assault supported by fire from their tanks and heavy guns. Disregarding the devastating barrage, he remained at his post and hurled white phosphorus grenades into the advancing enemy troops until they broke and retreated. A tank less than 50 yards away fired at his stronghold, destroyed the machinegun and blew him across the room again but he once more returned to the bitter fight and, with a rifle, single-handedly covered the withdrawal of his fellow soldiers when the post was finally abandoned. With inspiring bravery and intrepidity M/Sgt. Bertoldo withstood the attack of vastly superior forces for more than 48 hours without rest or relief, time after time escaping death only by the slightest margin while killing at least 40 hostile soldiers and wounding many more during his grim battle against the enemy hordes.

=== Additional awards ===
In addition to the Medal of Honor, Bertoldo was a recipient of the Combat Infantryman Badge, Bronze Star Medal with oak leaf cluster, Purple Heart, and French Croix de Guerre.

== Later life ==
Bertoldo continued to serve until the end of the war, and attained the rank of master sergeant. He was discharged from the Army in February 1946. He later worked as a contact representative for the Veterans Administration in San Francisco, ensuring that veterans knew they were eligible for benefits, helping them complete applications, and advocating for them as their applications were considered. After leaving the VA in 1958, Bertoldo owned a landscaping company.

== Death and burial ==
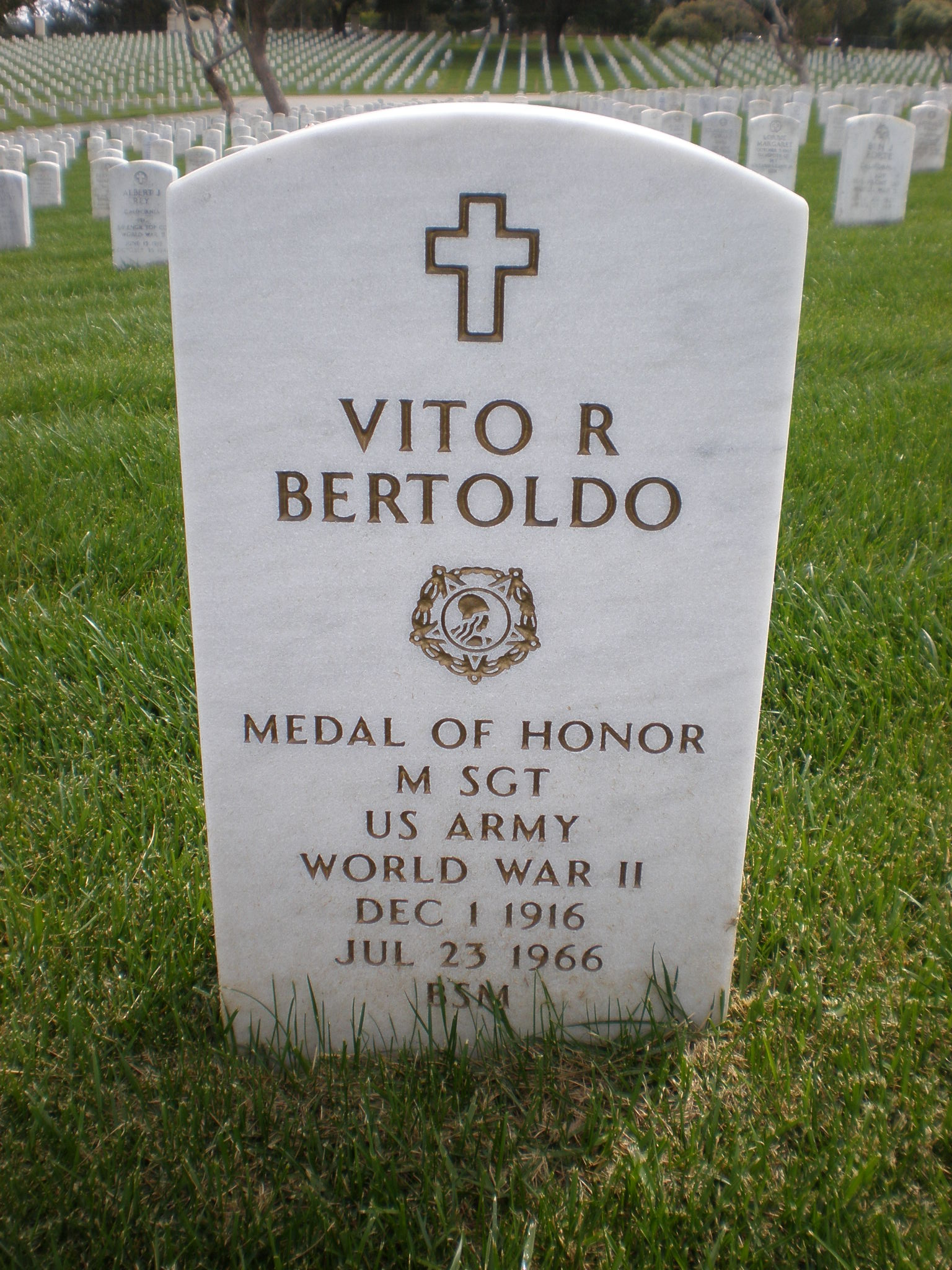
Bertoldo's headstone at Golden Gate National Cemetery in San Bruno, California

Bertoldo was diagnosed with lung cancer in 1966. He died at the VA hospital in Martinez, California on July 23, 1966. Bertoldo was buried at Golden Gate National Cemetery in San Bruno, California.

== Family ==
On August 2, 1941, Bertoldo married Dorothy Sutter of Decatur. They later divorced, and in 1958 he married Mae Clary of Kentfield, California, who survived him.

With his first wife, Bertoldo was the father of David Valor Bertoldo (born 1946), who served in the United States Marine Corps (1965–1983) during the Vietnam War and received the Bronze Star Medal. He served with the California Highway Patrol from 1983 to 2006. Bertoldo is also the grandfather of David Christopher Bertoldo (born 1968), who served in the United States Army during the Gulf War.

== In popular culture ==
Medal of Honor, a Netflix documentary series, includes a 2018 episode recounting Bertoldo's heroic actions. In the documentary recreation, Bertoldo is played by actor Ben Schwartz.

== See also ==
- List of Medal of Honor recipients
- List of Medal of Honor recipients for World War II

== Sources ==
=== Newspapers ===
- "Wedding Announcement: Vito Bertoldo and Dorothy Sutter". Herald & Review. Decatur, IL. August 24, 1941 – via Newspapers.com.
- "Cited for One-Man Battle Against Nazi Tank and Infantry". Freeport Journal. Freeport, IL. Associated Press. October 18, 1945 – via Newspapers.com.
- "Saved Battalion Posts: Sgt Vito Bertoldo; Official Medal of Honor Citation". Herald & Review. Decatur, IL. October 19, 1945 – via Newspapers.com.
- "Bulge Battle Hero Wins His Discharge". The Daily Mail. Hagerstown, MD. Associated Press. February 23, 1946 – via Newspapers.com.
- "Ex-Matean to Join Ceremony". San Mateo Times. San Mateo, CA. May 29, 1958 – via Newspapers.com.
- "Marriage Licenses: Vito Bertoldo and Mae Clary". San Rafael Independent-Journal. San Rafael, CA. July 25, 1958 – via Newspapers.com.
- "Obituary, Rocco Bertoldo". Herald & Review. Decatur, IL. August 18, 1962 – via Newspapers.com.
- "War Hero Bertoldo Dies". San Francisco Examiner. San Francisco, CA. July 26, 1966 – via Newspapers.com.
- "Ex-Resident Wins Medal". Herald & Review. Decatur, IL. August 22, 1966 – via Newspapers.com.
- Spires, Rex (February 27, 1982). "War Hero had Modest Nature". Herald & Review. Decatur, IL – via Newspapers.com.
- Bertoldo, David (August 4, 2002). "Letter to the Editor: Article on Local Veteran's Honors Liked by Family". Herald & Review. Decatur, IL – via Newspapers.com.

=== Internet ===
- Schmidt, Glenn E. (June 17, 1995). "Captain William Corson's Letter". TankBooks.com. New Britain, CT: Chi Chi Press.
- U.S. War Department Office of Public relations (1945). "Press Releases and Related Records, 1942-1945: Medal of Honor Action, Vito R. Bertoldo". Ancestry.com. Lehi, UT: Ancestry.com, LLC.
- "Netflix Original: Medal of Honor". Netflix.com. Los Gatos, CA: Netflix. 2018.

=== Books ===
- Sanders, Brandon (2000). Heroes to Remember. San Jose, CA: Writers Club Press. ISBN 978-0-595-14206-4.
