= 232nd Regiment =

232nd Regiment may refer to:

- 232nd Infantry Regiment, United States
- 232nd Signal Regiment, Italy
