= Mosheim =

Mosheim may refer to:

== Locations ==
- Mosheim, Tennessee
- Mosheim, Texas

== People ==
- Mosheim Feaster (1867–1950), American soldier
- Grete Mosheim (1905–1986), German actress
- Johann Lorenz von Mosheim (1693–1755), German Lutheran church historian
- Samuel Mosheim Schmucker (1823–1863), American historical writer and biographer
