= Golden Gate National Cemetery =

Veterans cemetery in San Mateo County, California

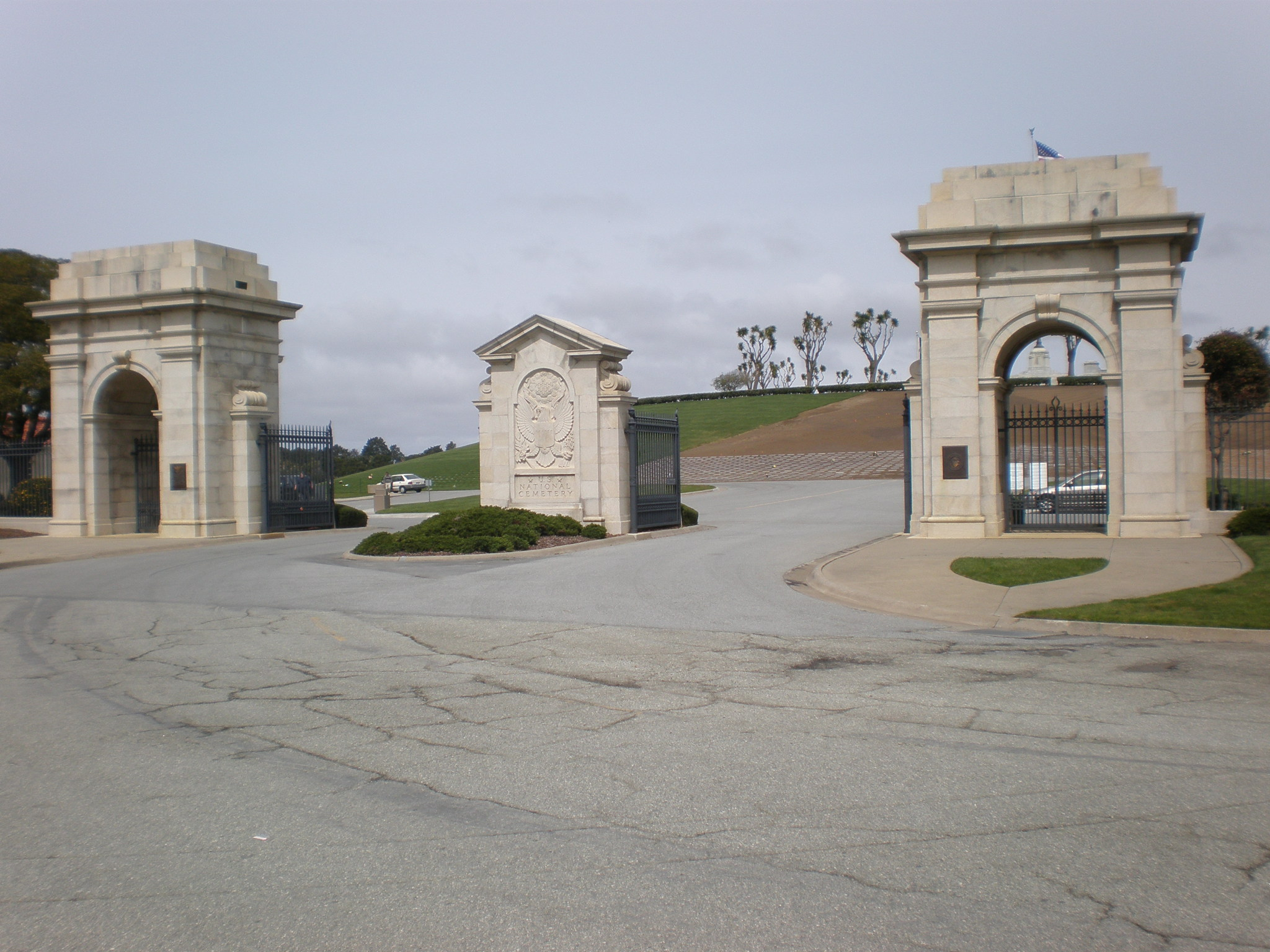
- Main gate in 2008
- Interactive map of Golden Gate National Cemetery

Details
- Established: 1937
- Location: 1300 Sneath Lane; San Bruno, California
- Country: United States
- Coordinates: 37°38′07″N 122°25′52″W
- Type: United States National Cemetery
- Size: 161.5 acres (0.654 km^{2})
- No. of graves: 145,000
- Website: US Dept of Veterans Affairs Golden Gate National Cemetery

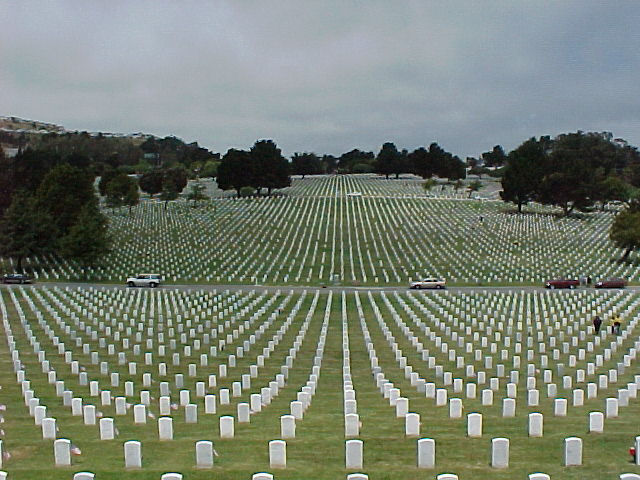
A view out from the center of the cemetery

Golden Gate National Cemetery is a United States national cemetery in California, United States, located in the city of San Bruno, 12 miles (20 km) south of San Francisco. Because of the name and location, it is frequently confused with San Francisco National Cemetery, which dates to the 19th century and is in the Presidio of San Francisco, in view of the Golden Gate. Around 1937, San Francisco residents voted to bar the opening of new cemeteries within the city proper and, as a result, the site for the new national cemetery was selected south of the city limits in adjacent San Mateo County.

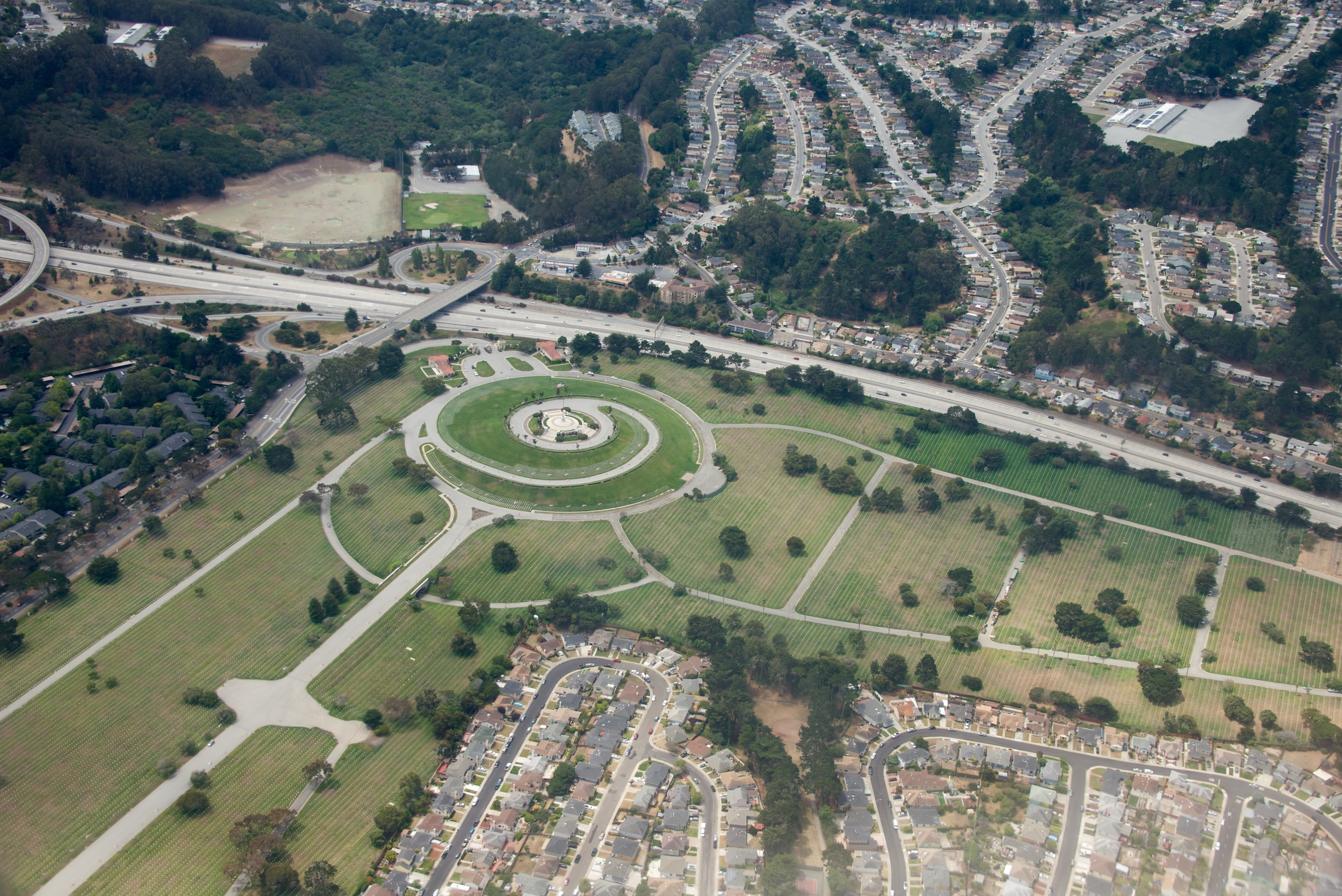
Aerial photograph of Golden Gate National Cemetery

== History ==
Congress authorized construction of the facility in 1937, with the first interments in 1941. The cemetery was officially dedicated on Memorial Day, May 30, 1942. California Attorney General Earl Warren (later Governor, then Chief Justice of the United States) was keynote speaker at the ceremony. Golden Gate is one of a large number of U.S. Army-planned cemeteries started in the 1930s and completed during the 1940s. They were designed specifically to provide abundant burial opportunities in locations around the nation in cities with very large veteran populations.

As of 2005, the cemetery held 137,435 interments. Over the years, several attempts to expand Golden Gate National Cemetery were met with resistance from local residents, so it has remained at its original 161.5 acres (0.654 km^{2}) since 1941.

Several service members who are buried at the Golden Gate National Cemetery were interned in the stables at the nearby Tanforan Racetrack during the early part of the Japanese American internment.

Also notable is that the Golden Gate National Cemetery was the first cemetery to initiate the large flag display on Memorial Day. Flags are raised around the base of the hill in the center of the cemetery and small flags are placed on each grave site by various scout volunteers. This practice was created and put into effect by John T. Spelman, the superintendent of the cemetery at the time.

The cemetery was listed on the National Register of Historic Places in 2016.

== Monuments and memorials ==
The American Veterans donated a Schulmerich carillon to the cemetery as part of their worldwide living memorial carillon program. The carillon was dedicated May 30, 1958.

== Notable burials ==
=== Medal of Honor Recipients ===
(Dates are of the actions for which they were awarded the Medal of Honor.)

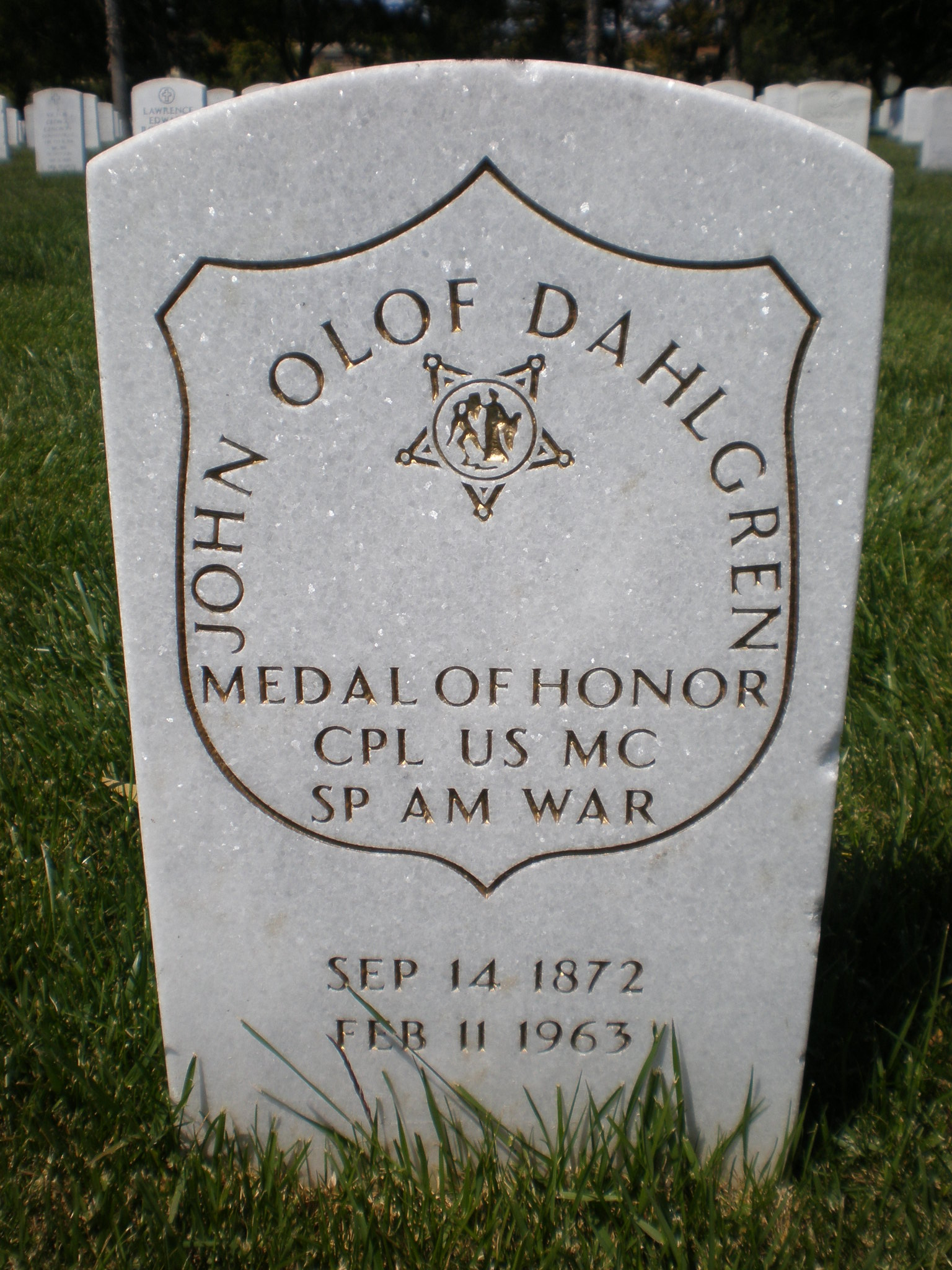
Headstone of John Dahlgren

- Corporal Edward A. Bennett (World War II), U.S. Army, Company B, 358th Infantry, 90th Infantry Division. Heckhuscheid, Germany, February 1, 1945
- Master Sergeant Vito R. Bertoldo (World War II), U.S. Army, Company A, 242nd Infantry, 42nd Infantry. Hatten, France, January 9–10, 1945
- Chief Gunner's Mate John Joseph Clausey U.S. Navy. On board the USS Bennington (PG-4), July 21, 1905
- Corporal John O. Dahlgren (Boxer Rebellion), U.S. Marine Corps. Peking, China, June 20 – July 16, 1900
- Private John Francis DeSwan (Spanish–American War), Company H, 21st U.S. Infantry. Santiago de Cuba, July 1, 1898
- Private Mosheim Feaster (Indian Wars), Company E, 7th U.S. Cavalry. Wounded Knee Creek, S.D., December 29, 1890
- Sergeant Paul H. Foster (Vietnam War), U.S. Marine Corps Reserve, 2nd Battalion, 4th Marines, 3rd Marine Division. Near Con Thien, Republic of Vietnam, October 14, 1967
- Sergeant Edward H. Gibson (Philippine–American War), Company M, 27th Infantry, U.S. Volunteers. San Mateo, Rizal, Philippine Islands, December 19, 1899
- Private First Class Harold Gonsalves (World War II), U.S. Marine Corps Reserve. Ryukyu Islands, April 15, 1945
- Captain Nelson M. Holderman (World War I), U.S. Army, 307th Infantry, 77th Division. Argonne, France, October 2–8, 1918
- Machinist's Mate William R. Huber, U.S. Navy. On board the USS Bruce, June 11, 1928
- Boatswain's Mate First Class Reinhardt J. Keppler (World War II), U.S. Navy. On board the USS San Francisco (CA-38), November 12–13, 1942
- Seaman Hugh P. Mullin (Philippine–American War), U.S. Navy. On board the USS Texas, November 11, 1899
- Private First Class Stuart S. Stryker (World War II), U.S. Army, Company E, 513th Parachute Infantry, 17th Airborne Division. Near Wesel, Germany, March 24, 1945
- Private First Class Robert H. Young (Korean War), U.S. Army, Company E., 8th Cavalry Regiment, 1st Cavalry Division. North of Kaesong, Korea, October 9, 1950

=== Medal of Freedom Recipients ===
- Beulah Estelle Ream Allen Jarvis (World War II), Volunteer Civilian Surgeon for the US Army. Her husband Henderson Wilcox Allen who died following the Bataan Death March, is also buried here. Beulah accepted a Soldier's Medal and a Bronze Star Medal for Henderson. All 3 medals received in 1945

=== Other burials ===
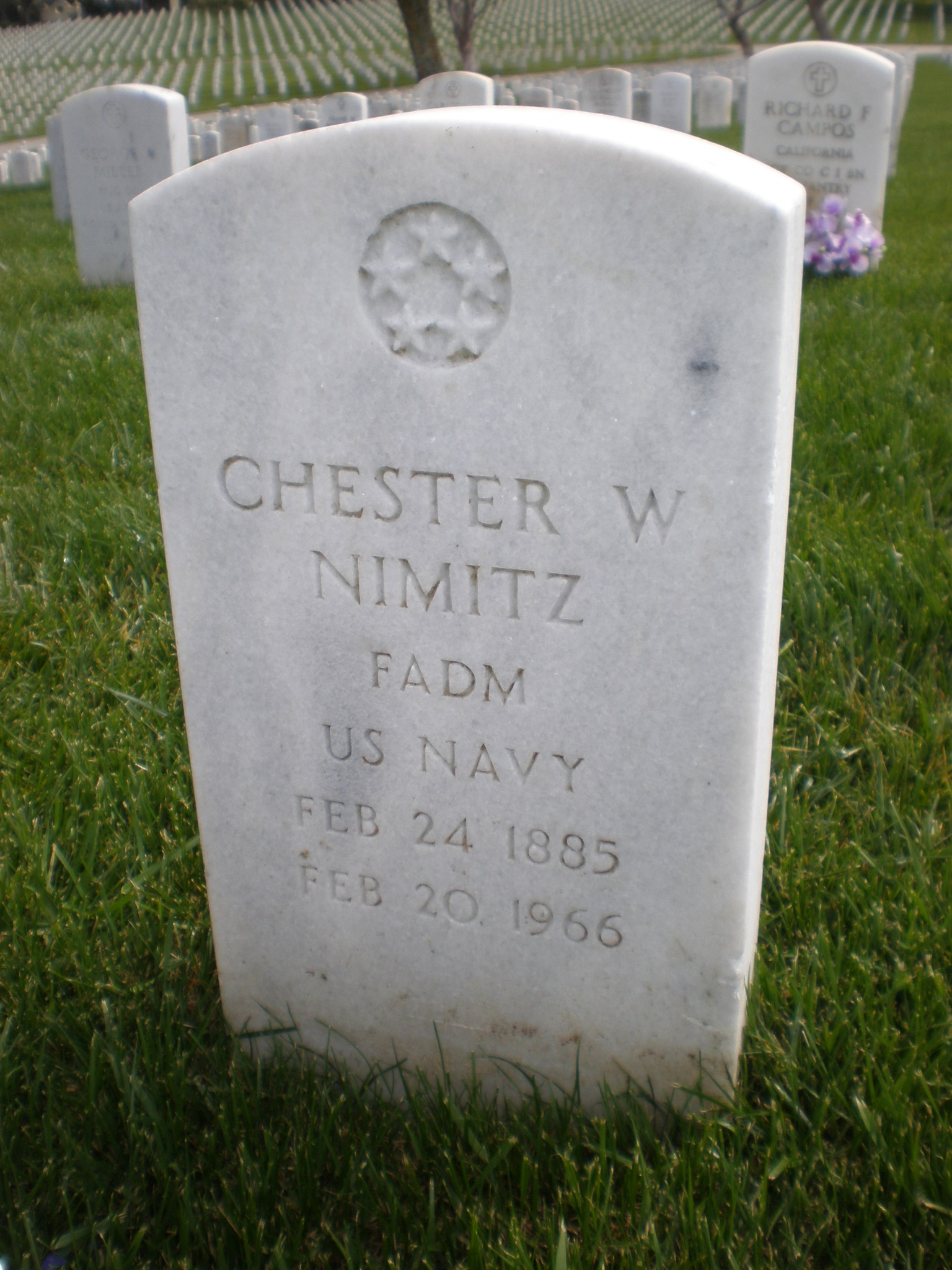
Nimitz's headstone

- Fleet Admiral Chester W. Nimitz, commander of Pacific Fleet in World War II. A number of distinguished officers who served under him are also buried there: Admirals Raymond A. Spruance, Richmond K. Turner, and Charles A. Lockwood, by an arrangement made by all of them while living.
- Edward L. Beach Sr., career naval officer
- Robert Blake, Marine Major General
- Joseph Gelders, antiracist, civil rights activist, labor organizer, and communist
- Philip Habib, U.S. diplomat, veteran of World War II
- David A. Hargrave, fantasy author and Vietnam War veteran
- Besby Holmes, fighter pilot decorated for his role in Operation Vengeance
- LeRoy P. Hunt, highly decorated Marine Corps General
- Percy Kilbride, character actor, best known role was as 'Pa Kettle' in the "Ma & Pa Kettle" comedy film series of the 1950s
- Gilbert N. Lewis, physical chemist, contributed heavily to many fields of chemistry, best known for valance bond theory.
- Theodore Marcuse, character actor, served with the U.S. Navy as a lieutenant on the famed submarine USS Tirante. After World War II he trained to become an actor.
- Harold R. Mazza, World War II Navy pilot, the only Naval aviator to win four Navy Crosses.
- Percy Northcroft, All-American football player in 1906 and 1908 for the United States Naval Academy
- Harlin Pool, baseball player
- Leo Ryan, the first member of U.S. Congress to have been killed on duty in office; in Guyana
- Oliver Sipple, Marine Vietnam War veteran who thwarted a 1975 assassination attempt on President Gerald Ford
- Tiny Thornhill, college football player and coach at Stanford
- Edward L. Toppins, African-American World War II fighter pilot within 99th Pursuit Squadron of the famed Tuskegee Airmen
- Adrien Voisin, American sculptor; during World War I he served first in the American Volunteer Motor Ambulance Corps, and later served in the 49th Infantry Regiment in the United States Army
- Dan White, paratrooper in the Vietnam War and a former San Francisco County Supervisor; he assassinated San Francisco County Supervisor Harvey Milk and San Francisco Mayor George Moscone on November 27, 1978
- Clarence E. Willard, freak act vaudeville performer, known for elongation tricks

==== Non-citizens ====
- 3 British Commonwealth servicemen of World War II are buried here – one each from the Royal Air Force Ferry Command, Royal Canadian Air Force and Royal Australian Air Force.
- The 44 German and Italian prisoners-of-war interred here were captured in North Africa after the collapse of the German Afrika Korps under the command of Fieldmarshal Erwin Rommel in 1943. The POWs were housed at Camp Beale and Camp Cook in California and Camp Rupert in Idaho, where they were originally buried at the respective post cemeteries. When the posts closed, the POWs were re-interred at Golden Gate.
