= 242nd Infantry Regiment =

Unit of the United States Army

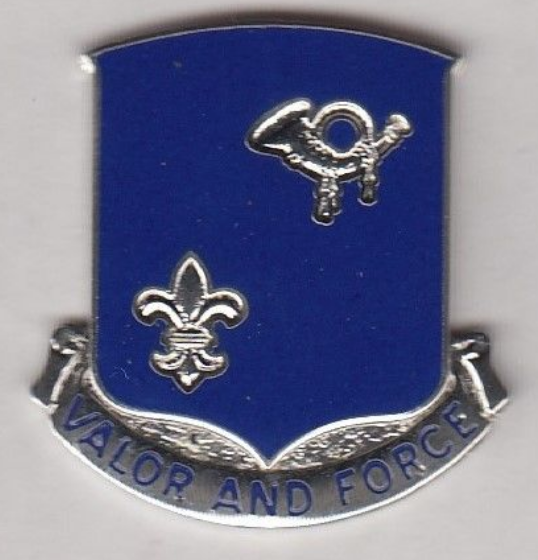
- Distinctive Unit Insignia of the 242nd Infantry Regiment
- Active: 1943–1947; 1975–1984
- Country: United States
- Branch: United States Army: Army of the United States (1943–1947); New York Army National Guard (1975–1984)
- Type: Infantry
- Mottos: Valor and Force
- Engagements: World War II: Ardennes-Alsace; Rhineland; Central Europe

Commanders
- Notable commanders: Colonel Burns Beall; Colonel Norman C. Caum; John C. F. Tillson III

The 242nd Infantry Regiment was a formation of the United States Army. Organized as part of the 42nd Infantry Division during World War II, the regiment took part in fighting against the Germans and performed post-war occupation duty in Austria. The 242nd Infantry's most notable member was Vito R. Bertoldo, who received the Medal of Honor for heroism in combat near Hatten, France, in January 1945.

== Formation ==
Shoulder Sleeve Insignia of the 42nd Infantry Division

In June 1943, the United States Department of War issued orders reactivating the 42nd Infantry Division for service in World War II. The division's task organization included the 222nd, 232nd, and 242nd Infantry Regiments.

The cadre of experienced officers and noncommissioned officers around which the 242nd Infantry formed had recently returned from overseas service in Hawaii and Newfoundland, and assembled at Fort Benning, Georgia and Camp Maxey, Texas prior to relocating to Camp Gruber, Oklahoma. The 242nd Infantry was activated at Camp Gruber on July 14, 1943.

Recruits, draftees, and soldiers reassigned to the 242nd Infantry began arriving at Camp Gruber in August 1943. At the end of October, the 242nd Infantry Regiment reached 100 percent of its authorized strength.

The regiment's first commander was Colonel Burns Beall. He was subsequently assigned as the division chief of staff, and was succeeded by Colonel Norman C. Caum in October 1944.

== Task organization ==
The 242nd Infantry Regiment's World War II task organization included:

- Regimental headquarters

- Headquarters Company
- Anti-Tank Company
- Cannon Company
- Service Company

- Medical Detachment

- 1st Battalion

- Headquarters Company
- Company A
- Company B
- Company C
- Company D

- 2nd Battalion

- Headquarters Company
- Company E
- Company F
- Company G
- Company H

- 3rd Battalion

- Headquarters Company
- Company I
- Company K
- Company L
- Company M

== Combat history ==
Following training at Camp Gruber and transport to Europe, the 42nd Infantry Division's three infantry regiments and a detachment of the division headquarters arrived at Marseille, France, on December 8–9, 1944. These units were organized as Task Force Linden, under the command of Henning Linden, the brigadier general assigned as the 42nd Division's assistant division commander. As part of the Seventh Army's VI Corps, Task Force Linden entered combat in the vicinity of Strasbourg, relieving units of the 36th Infantry Division on December 24, 1944.

While defending a 31-mile sector along the Rhine north and south of Strasbourg in January 1945, Task Force Linden repulsed a number of enemy counterattacks at Hatten and other locations during the German "Operation Northwind" offensive. At the headquarters of 1st Battalion, 242nd Infantry, Private First Class Vito R. Bertoldo waged a 48-hour defense of the battalion command post, for which he received the Medal of Honor.

In February 1945, the full 42nd Division entered combat and took up defensive positions near Haguenau in the Hardt Forest. On February 27, the division went on the offensive. It attacked through the Haardt forest, broke through the Siegfried Line from March 15 to 21, and cleared Dahn and Busenberg, while units of Third Army created and expanded bridgeheads across the Rhine.

The 42nd Division moved across the Rhine on March 31, captured Wertheim am Main on April 1, and captured Würzburg on April 6, following four days of intense fighting. After hand-to-hand fighting from 9 to 12 April, Schweinfurt fell. German forces in Fürth, near Nürnberg, put up fanatical resistance, but were defeated after combat on 18 and 19 April.

On April 25, the 42nd Infantry Division captured Donauwörth on the Danube. On April 29, soldiers of the 222nd Infantry under Linden's command liberated approximately 30,000 prisoners at Dachau concentration camp.

The 42nd Division ended World War II on occupation duty in Austria. While serving on occupation duty, the regiment's 1st Battalion was awarded the Presidential Unit Citation for their stand at Hatten in January 1945.The regiment was inactivated in January 1947.

=== Campaign participation credit ===
The 242nd Infantry Regiment's campaign participation credit included:

- World War II

- Ardennes-Alsace
- Rhineland
- Central Europe

== Post-World War II ==
In April 1975, the New York Army National Guard's 142nd Tank Battalion was converted to Infantry and re-designated 1st Battalion, 242nd Infantry Regiment, a unit of New York's 42nd Division. This unit was inactivated in April 1984.

== Sources ==
=== Books ===
- Aumiller, Timothy S. (2008). United States Army Infantry, Artillery, Armor/Cavalry Battalions 1957-2011. Takoma Park, MD: Tiger Lily Publications. ISBN 978-0-9776-0722-8 – via Google Books.
- 242d Infantry Regiment Staff (1944). 242d Infantry Regiment, 42d Infantry Division. Baton Rouge, LA: Army and Navy Publishing Company of Louisiana. OCLC 270744617.
- Daly, Hugh C. (1945). 42nd "Rainbow" Infantry Division: A Combat History of World War II. Baton Rouge, LA: Army and Navy Publishing Company of Louisiana – via Internet Archive.
- Dann, Sam (1998). Dachau 29 April 1945: The Rainbow Liberation Memoirs. Lubbock, TX: Texas Tech University Press. p. 14. ISBN 978-0-89672-391-7 – via Internet Archive.
- Polmar, Norman; Allen, Thomas B. (2012). World War II: The Encyclopedia of the War Years, 1941-1945. Mineola, NY: Dover Publications. ISBN 978-0-4864-7962-0 – via Google Books.
- Wilson, John B. (1998). "Chapter VIII: An Interlude of Peace". Maneuver and Firepower: The Evolution of Divisions and Separate Brigades. Army Lineage Series. United States Army Center of Military History. CMH Pub 60-14. Archived from the original on 26 December 2012.

=== Internet ===
- "242nd Infantry Regiment, 1st Battalion". dmna.ny.gov. Albany, NY: New York State Division of Military and Naval Affairs.
