= 232nd Infantry Regiment =

- Shoulder Sleeve Insignia
- Active: 1943–1947
- Country: United States
- Branch: United States Army; Army of the United States
- Type: Infantry
- Engagements: World War II: Operation Nordwind; Operation Undertone; Western Allied invasion of Germany

Commanders
- Notable commanders: COL Alfred A. McNamee

The 232nd Infantry Regiment was an infantry regiment of the United States Army during World War II. It served in combat with the 42nd Infantry Division, the "Rainbow Division", and served during the Occupation of Germany before its deactivation in 1947.

== Organization ==
The regiment was organized with 3,256 officers and enlisted men:

- Headquarters & Headquarters Company: 111
- Service Company: 114
- Anti-Tank Company: 165
- Cannon Company: 118
- Medical Detachment: 135
- Infantry Battalion (×3): 871
  - Headquarters & Headquarters Company: 126
  - Rifle Company (×3): 193
  - Weapons Company: 156

== History ==
The 232nd Infantry Regiment was activated on 14 July 1943 and was assigned to the 42nd Infantry Division, the "Rainbow Division." The 42nd served in World War I as an Army National Guard unit, but was activated for service in World War II as a draftee division, in the Army of the United States. Three new infantry regiments; the 222nd Infantry Regiment, the 232nd Infantry Regiment, and the 242nd Infantry Regiment were created to fill the division. The division was activated at Camp Gruber, Oklahoma, and after months of strenuous training, the men shipped out for France. The 232nd arrived in Marseille on 8 December 1944, and quickly began preparing for combat.

== Task Force Linden ==
The three infantry regiments of the 42nd Division (222nd, 232nd, and 242nd) and a detachment of the division HQ arrived ahead of the rest of the unit. They were organized into Task Force Linden, under the command of the division assistant commander, General Henning Linden. Stationed initially at "Command Post 2", or CP2, the men of the 232nd had few luxuries and endured the cold December nights in tents under blackout conditions. They left CP2 and headed to relieve the 36th Infantry Division at Strasbourg on December 19, and entered the frontline on 24 December, Christmas Eve. Holding the left (north) flank, the 232nd was given a sector stretching 22 miles along the Rhine to defend against veteran German paratroops and Panzer forces. Equivalent to be about one man for every 40 feet, which was a very thin defensive force with no reserves. It was about 20 degrees and one of the worst winters experienced in 50 years. Frostbite was common, and the foxholes offered no protection against the weather.

On 3 January, the 1st Battalion (1-232) was moved north to relieve the 70th Infantry Division's 274th Infantry Regiment. The regimental front was now 33 miles long. On 5 January, French troops relieved the Americans in Strasbourg, and while the elements of the 232nd were relocated, the German Army attacked at 0745. The 232nd held the towns of Gambsheim, Offendorf, Herrlisheim, and Kilstett. In the town of Gambsheim, enemy tanks and infantry were ferried across the river and, despite individual courage, the odds were too great for the Americans. Germans surrounded the town and the majority of its defenders; men of two rifle platoons of Company L, a machine gun and mortar section of Company M, an anti-tank squad from the 3rd Battalion (3-232) Headquarters, all from the 232nd Infantry, were captured or killed. G Company, holding Offendorf, was assaulted by lines of Germans and were eventually surrounded and captured, and at Herrlisheim, only 80 defenders managed to fight their way out and reach Kilstett.

As the G.I.s began preparing to defend Kilstett, COL McNamee, the CO of the 232nd, organized a counterattack. At this point, infantry companies had become jumbled, so large bodies were formed into Task Forces, and Task Force B was joined by E Co, 2–232, which acted as a reserve for the counter-thrust, and took back the town of Gambsheim on the morning of 6 January. Companies F and K engaged in merciless small unit actions trying to clear out the Germans from the towns and forests near Gambsheim, and meanwhile B Company, 1–232, had been surrounded to the north, in the town of Stattmatten, and A Company was under direct artillery in the town of Drusenheim. B Co managed to break out of the encirclement, and on the morning of the 6th, launched a counterattack that drove the Germans from the town and captured several prisoners. The 314th Infantry Regiment of the 79th Infantry Division attacked to the north and relieved A Company. The Germans had been held at bay, and the GIs of the 232nd rested in their cold, wet foxholes as they waited for orders. Aggressive patrolling followed the action, as the Wehrmacht threw its might to the south, against the 222nd Infantry.

On 16 January 1945, B Company, 1–232, defended the towns of Sessenheim, Dangolsheim, and Stattmatten. Companies C and I were to the north, and K to the south. These men were soon attacked by elements of the German 7th Parachute Division. After three days of attacks and counterattacks in the cold, snowy towns and woods, the Germans were driven, off, but the Americans, especially B Company, took many casualties. After this engagement, the 232nd Infantry Regiment went into VI Corps reserve.

On 24 January, the Germans launched their final assault in Operation Nordwind, and attacked straight into the 42nd Infantry Division. The 232nd was brought up from reserve to help in the defense, and on the 25th, the took up positions on the frontline in Schweighausen and the Bois d'Ohlungen. The enemy had been driven off, however, and the 232nd remained in a defensive posture here until 14 February. They were then sent to relieve elements of the 45th Infantry Division northwest of Haguenau.

== Operation Undertone ==
On 17 February, Task Force Linden was dissolved when the rest of the 42nd Infantry Division, under Major General Harry J. Collins arrived. Occupying a defensive sector of four miles, the 232nd was placed on the right (south) flank. The regiment began an active defense and conducted 38 reconnaissance patrols and 26 combat patrols by 28 February. They suffered 2 killed, 16 wounded, and 2 missing, while inflicting 12 known enemy dead and 3 known enemy wounded. The majority of their casualties came from Schu mines.

Beginning on 15 March 1945, the 232nd Infantry became engaged in Allied efforts to break the Siegfried Line in Operation Undertone. Anchoring the 42nd Division's right flank, they linked in with the 103rd Infantry Division. The 232nd's mission was to attack northeast and clear the Bitche-Haguenau road. 2-232 was detached and assigned to Task Force Coleman with the mission of exploiting any sudden breakthroughs, because this battalion was the only one in the regiment that was motorized. The regiment attacked and captured Hill 302, 500 yards northeast of Reipertswiller and cleared the surrounding high ground. Now in the center of the divisional line, the 232nd advanced abreast of the 222nd and 242nd to clear out the enemy. By 17 March, the 232nd had captured Neunhoffen and Dambach, and the regiment became the first infantry unit of the 42nd to cross the Siegfried Line.

Attacking next across the Saarbach River on 20 March, the 232nd suffered heavy casualties while crossing bridges, but eventually took their objectives. Pushing through Germany, the regiment seized towns and captured numerous enemy prisoners before crossing the Rhine on Easter Sunday.

== Invasion of Germany ==
Relieving elements of the 3rd Infantry Division, the 232nd Infantry Regiment moved into the line on 1 April. The leading elements of the 232nd encountered strong enemy resistance in the vicinity of the Hassloch River and the advance was slow and difficult over mountainous terrain and a poor road net. On 2 April, the 232nd engaged the Germans in Würzburg by launching a feint north of the city to cover the approach of the 222nd and 242nd. On 4 April, the regiment moved into Würzburg and began clearing the northern neighborhoods, where resistance was fanatical. Civilians joined military personnel in battling the attackers. City firemen and policemen joined in the defense of the city; nearly every house and building contained snipers and panzerfausts. Würzburg was finally captured on 6 April after intense fighting, and the 42nd Division continued its drive into the Nazi heartland. On 10 April 1945, the 232nd was ordered to flank the city of Schweinfurt from behind, and they encountered fanatical resistance from enemy infantry in Arnstein by soldiers not more than 17 years old, the last of German manpower. Sometime later in April, the Regiment assisted in the liberation of the infamous Dachau Concentration Camp. On Victory in Europe Day, 8 May 1945, the 232nd Infantry Regiment was in Austria, attending to the mass surrenders of thousands of German prisoners fleeing from the Soviet offensives in the east.

== Occupation of Austria and Germany ==
Several times while the 42nd Infantry Division was occupying the Tyrol region of Austria, its occupational boundaries were changed. When the Division first moved into the area, it was responsible for both the eastern portion of the Tyrol and portions of Landkreis Rosenheim, Bad Aibling and Miesbach immediately north of it in Germany. On 19 May, the area was extended to include all of these three German areas and also the adjoining Landkreis Ebersberg. It was into this area of Ebersburg and Aibling that 200,000 surrendered German troops were being moved and the task of guarding them was assigned to the 232nd Infantry Regiment. On 24 May, however, other troops took over in these areas and the 232nd was relieved. By the end of January 1947, the men of the 232nd Infantry Regiment, and of the 42nd Infantry Division, went home to the US and the unit was deactivated.

== Campaigns ==
Conflict	Streamer	Year(s)
World War II	Northern France	1944
World War II	Rhineland	1945
World War II	Ardennes-Alsace	1944–1945
World War II	Central Europe	1945
