= 222nd Infantry Regiment =

- Shoulder Sleeve Insignia
- Active: 1943-1947
- Country: United States
- Branch: Army of the United States
- Type: Infantry
- Size: Regiment
- Motto: Wild Kings Go Forth
- Engagements: World War II; Operation Nordwind; Operation Undertone; Western Allied invasion of Germany

Commanders
- Notable commanders: Colonel Henry Luongo

The 222nd Infantry Regiment was an infantry regiment of the United States Army, AUS. It served in the 42nd Infantry Division for the duration of the Second World War, and was then deactivated. The regiment distinguished itself in battle against the Wehrmacht and earned the Presidential Unit Citation for courageous action.

== History ==
When the 42nd Infantry Division was activated on 14 July 1943, three new infantry regiments were created to fill the division up because all of the regiments that had formed the division during World War I were serving elsewhere. The 222nd Infantry Regiment, 232nd Infantry Regiment, and the 242nd Infantry Regiment were activated and included recruits from all 48 states. The 222nd Infantry Regiment underwent intense combat training at Camp Gruber, Oklahoma and arrived in Marseille, France, in November 1944. After a brief period of training and reconsolidation, the regiment was attached to "Task Force Linden" under the command of General Henning Linden in early December to prepare for combat. On 24 December 1944, the Task Force (TF) entered combat in the vicinity of Strasbourg, relieving the 36th Infantry Division of the Texas Army National Guard and became engaged in minor skirmishing with the Germans until the advent of major battle.

== Operation Nordwind ==
On 31 December, the Germans launched a major offensive in north-eastern France, called Operation Nordwind, and managed to gain ground against the Seventh United States Army, and the First French Army. In order to cut off the American held town of Haguenau, the Wehrmacht needed to encircle the position in a pincer move. However, their offensive would grind to a halt once they reached the positions of the 42nd Infantry Division. On the night of 24 January 1945, the second to last day of the German counterattack, the 222nd Infantry Regiment would see its first major combat in the face of a determined and experienced enemy. The G.I.'s were dug in in fighting positions in the Ohlugen Forest looking towards the Forest of Haguenau, where thick foliage and a dense low-lying fog both concealed their positions and obscured the Germans' movements. Facing the green Americans of the 222nd Infantry were elements of the 25th Panzergrenadier Division, the 47th Volksgrenadier Division, and the 7th Fallschirmjäger Division.

Colonel Luongo, the commander of the 222nd, spread out his soldiers across five major defensive positions from west to east; a series of hills to the west, in Neubourg, Mill d'Uhrbruck, the Ohlungen Forest, and the town of Schweighausen to the east. The arrival of the Germans was heralded by loud taunts and oaths sent across the line to intimidate the waiting Americans, and the assault began at 1800 with an artillery barrage first on Schweighausen, then eventually the whole regimental line. The barrage included artillery guns and Nebelwerfer rockets, and was very effective despite the darkness of the night. During the first hour of the barrage, nearly all the 222nd's phone lines were knocked out and their radios proved to be ineffective in the woodland. Supporting American artillery was ineffective, and the Battalion HQ for the 1st (1–222) and 2nd (2–222) Battalions had to be moved after receiving accurate fire. E Company 2–222, made first contact with enemy ground troops at 2015, when the Germans charged across the firebreak that separated their two positions. Heavy machine-gun and mortar fire from the US positions halted the attackers, and the commanding officer of E Company (Lieutenant George Carroll) counterattacked and drove the Germans back.

This reprieve was short-lived and the Panzergrenadiers attacked the E Company positions once again near the Mill d'Uhrbruck, and overwhelmed the defenders. First Lieutenant Richard Break gathered the remnants of E Company and attempted three counterattacks to regain the position, but these were repulsed. K Company of 3rd Battalion (3–222) was hit with artillery on its right flank and its 2nd Platoon was left with only 22 men under the command of Sergeant Chambers. Their Platoon leader was missing, and was cut off from reinforcement. The position was attacked by a company of Germans and was overrun, and the surviving G.I.'s were forced to make a painfully slow retreat by crawling through a ditch. Only 11 men escaped to the K Company command post at Neubourg. The regiment was heavily engaged all across its line, and during the fighting, First Lieutenant Carlyle Woelfer, the commanding officer of K Company, managed to capture a German officer with valuable maps detailing their offensive plan. The officer and another prisoner were put on an M8 Greyhound of the 813th Tank Destroyer Battalion for transport, but soon began signalling for other German soldiers to come to their rescue. Three Germans popped out and killed PFC Edmund Sheppard, but were in turn killed by Woelfer.

At this point in the battle, E Company was weakened and their right flank was exposed due a shifting of troops to protect the left, so the Germans took advantage of this development and attacked through the woods. E Company men were forced to retreat to Schweighausen, after Germans swarmed their dugouts from multiple directions. First Lieutenant Merrill, leader of the 2nd Platoon, F Company, withdrew the soldiers he could to the outskirts of Schweighausen to regroup for a counterattack on the Ohlungen Forest, which was now occupied by the Germans. The six men guarding Merrill's left flank were overrun and never seen again. The center of the 222nd Infantry's line had been shattered; E Company was cut off, and K and F Companies were mauled. First Lieutenant Carroll, commanding officer of E Company, decided his position was indefensible, and he led his men back to their original positions during a brief lull in the battle around 0230, fighting off groups of enemy along the way. For the rest of the night, the 222nd fought to contain the breakthrough. The right of the line, at Schweighausen, continued to hold. The strongest attack on the town came from the west, when Fallschirmjägers moved up through the Haguenau Forest and came down through the wedge that had been driven between Companies E and F. The heavy weapons platoon from H Company, under Second Lieutenant Klare Moyer, was sent to plug the gap. This platoon, along with elements of F and G Companies, counterattacked until they were forced back by artillery fire.

A few hours earlier, at 2000, Major Downard ordered G Company to attack the Germans, but they strayed from their assigned route and stumbled upon an unexpected German position. The fusillade began suddenly, but would last for a long time. The startled Americans reeled from the initial barrage, but soon charged into the fray and captured the enemy positions, from which they poured fire into the German flanks. After five hours, Captain Palmes ordered a tactical withdrawal. This engagement cost G Company 4 dead and 19 wounded, and inflicted 67 German dead. Although they failed to accomplish their initial objective, they did a great deal to stem the German advance on Schweighausen.

Meanwhile, in Neubourg, K and L Companies fought a bitter struggle with the advancing Germans that eventually resulted in hand-to-hand combat. During this combat, Privates Franklin Van Nest and Joe McGraw engaged in a hand-to-hand struggle with a pair of Germans, and Van Nest (a big man) wielded a knife as large as a Roman short sword. Despite winning this brief encounter, the Germans wounded the two privates with grenades. Companies I and M were heavily engaged in the west defending against the breakthrough. The Volksgrenadiers were less than aggressive in their assaults and machine-gun fire effectively halted their advance. 1-222 was alerted to move at 2050, in order to sweep the Panzergrenadiers and the Fallschirmjägers out of the Ohlugen woods. B Company was sent to the Mill d'Uhrbruck shortly after midnight but became pinned down in an hour long engagement in the forest. They eventually advanced into the enemy and took the position at the cost of 8 killed and 15 wounded, but inflicting 50 German killed.

At 1030 in the morning of 25 January, reinforcements arrived to assist the beleaguered defenders. The 314th Infantry Regiment of the 79th Infantry Division arrived to relieve the 222nd. The veterans of the previous night's action greeted the newcomers with silent gratitude. I Company, off to the north side of the road, and K Company, to the south of the road, looked on as the men of the 314th shoved off into the woods toward the Mill d'Uhrbruck to do battle with the Germans. The 222nd Infantry regiment took a mauling, but held their ground, and received the Presidential Unit Citation for defeating the German onslaught, and bringing an end to Operation Nordwind.

== Engagements in Germany ==
After the furious engagement of 24–25 January 1945, TF Linden rejoined the rest of the 42nd Infantry Division and went on the offensive into Germany. The regiment moved with the division near their old positions by Haguenau and began patrolling and attacking through the Hardt Forest on 14 February. The men broke through the Siegfried line and advanced rapidly, clearing out many cities and towns on their way. On 1 April 1945, the 42nd Division, including the 222nd Infantry Regiment, captured Wertheim am Main, and crossed the river there. They captured Würzburg after a sharp engagement from 2–6 April. Schweinfurt was captured next after hand-to-hand combat in the city from 9–12 April. Fürth fell to the advancing 222nd next on 18–19 April.

== Dachau ==
On 29 April, Brigadier General Henning Linden and his aide, First Lieutenant Cowling arrived in Dachau and were heading to rendezvous with the 222nd Infantry for the push into Munich. They were informed that just off the main road was the Dachau concentration camp. According to their Official Reports, dated 2 May 1945, prior to finding the camp, they discovered a railroad track with 30-50 boxcars all stacked with emaciated dead bodies. Their party proceeded to the Camp and as they approached the main gate a German Leutnant along with another German soldier and a Red Cross worker approached with a white flag and said they wished to surrender the camp.

Linden officially accepted the surrender of the camp in the name of the Rainbow Division for the United States Army. He sent Cowling into the camp for an inspection and he sent another officer to the 222nd to bring back two companies as soon as possible. At the time there were over 30,000 prisoners at the camp. After Dachau was liberated, the US Seventh Army took over the administration of the camp. A team of Army doctors and other military personnel was formed as Displaced Persons Team 115 to take care of the prisoners and they arrived on 30 April with truckloads of food and medical supplies. On 2 May, the 116th Evacuation Hospital arrived, followed by the 127th Evacuation Hospital, to give medical aid to the sick prisoners.

Private Carl Segrave from Broken Arrow, Oklahoma, a 19-year-old soldier in the 222nd, spoke to the Tulsa World about what he saw there. In an article published on 11 November 2008, Segrave told Manny Gamallo about what he witnessed; "The stench of rotting cadavers. The boxcars filled with the emaciated dead. The storage rooms filled with stacks of recently gassed innocents. The ghastly crematoriums. And the piles upon piles of human ashes. When he saw that, Segrave remembered, he developed a sincere hatred for the Germans. 'I didn't hate them before that, not even during the fighting. We were invading their homeland, so you expected them to defend their country. But this. ,' he said, shaking his head in disgust as he sat in his easy chair at his Broken Arrow home."

The regiment continued its advance into Germany, and reached Salzburg, Austria at the End of World War II in Europe.

== Occupation ==
On 14 May, the 42nd Infantry Division moved into the Austrian region of Tyrol and relieved the 36th Infantry Division and was itself eventually relieved by the 20th Armored Division. The 222nd set up checkpoints and road blocks throughout the countryside to halt the escape of German soldiers, SS troops, and Nazi Party officials into the mountains. Roads and trails were patrolled for stragglers and holdouts, but relations with the civilians were not hostile. On 8 July, the 42nd Division moved to the vicinity of Salzburg and conducted similar occupation duties, relieving the 101st Airborne Division. On 9 August, K Company of the 222nd traveled to Vienna, and had the privilege to serve as the honor guard for General Mark W. Clark. By 2 September, the majority of the 222nd had also moved into Vienna, and in October, soldiers from the 66th Infantry Division who didn't have enough points to go home were transferred to the 222nd Infantry. The regiment served in the occupation of Austria, before its return to the United States, and its deactivation at the end of January 1947.
