= Edward H. Gibson =

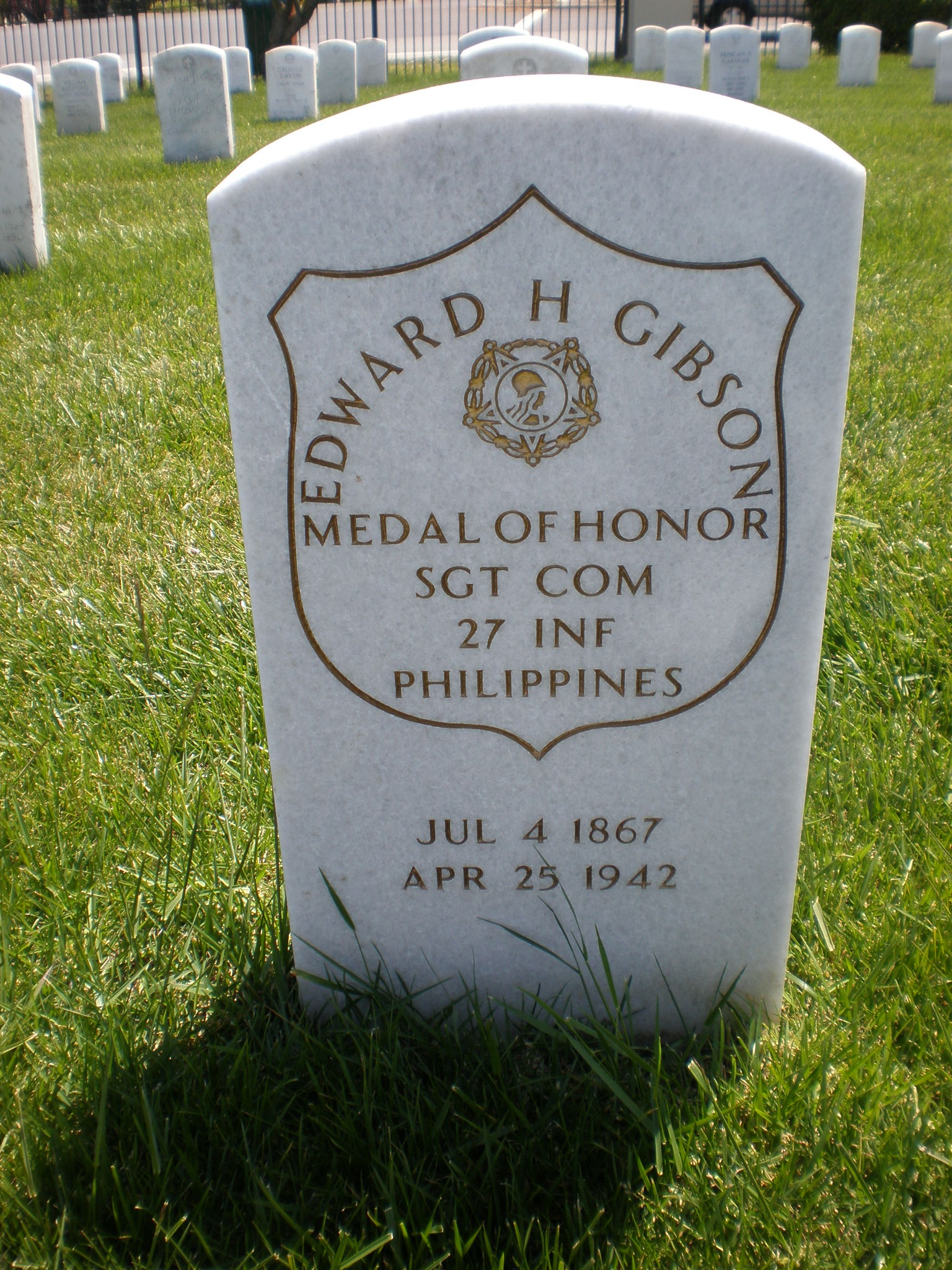
- Gibson's headstone at Golden Gate National Cemetery
- Born: Edward Herrick Gibson; July 4, 1872; Boston, Massachusetts, US
- Died: April 25, 1942 (aged 69)
- Burial place: Golden Gate National Cemetery, San Bruno, California
- Military career
- Allegiance: United States
- Branch: United States Army
- Service years: 1899–1901
- Rank: Sergeant
- Units: 27th Infantry, U.S. Volunteers
- Awards: Medal of Honor

Edward Herrick Gibson (July 4, 1872 – April 25, 1942) was a United States Army Sergeant received the Medal of Honor for actions during the Philippine–American War. He was awarded the Medal for the same action as Corporal Antoine Gaujot. The Medal was received for actions on December 19, 1899, at the Battle of Paye near Mateo during the Philippine–American War. Gibson is buried in Golden Gate National Cemetery in San Bruno, California.

Gibson enlisted in the Army in July 1899, and was discharged in April 1901.

== Medal of Honor citation ==
Rank and organization: Sergeant, Company M, 27th Infantry, U.S. Volunteers. Place and date: At San Mateo, Philippine Islands, December 19, 1899. Entered service at: Boston, Mass. Birth: Boston, Mass. Date of issue: Unknown.

Citation:

Attempted under a heavy fire of the enemy to swim a river for the purpose of obtaining and returning with a canoe.

== See also ==
- List of Medal of Honor recipients
- List of Philippine–American War Medal of Honor recipients
