= Besby Holmes =

American military pilot (1917–2006)

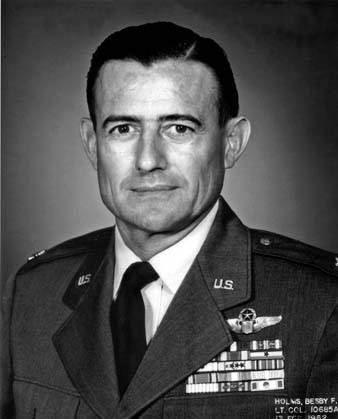
- Born: December 5, 1917; San Francisco, California, U.S.
- Died: July 23, 2006 (aged 88) Greenbrae, California, U.S.
- Buried: Golden Gate National Cemetery
- Allegiance: United States
- Branch: USAAC / USAAF / USAF
- Service years: 1941–1968
- Rank: Lieutenant colonel
- Conflicts: World War II; Korean War; Vietnam War
- Awards: Navy Cross; Distinguished Flying Cross × 3; Air Medal
- Education: City College of San Francisco

Lieutenant Colonel Besby Frank Holmes (December 5, 1917 – July 23, 2006) was an American fighter pilot who in April 1943 took part in Operation Vengeance, a notable American wartime effort to kill Japanese admiral Isoroku Yamamoto, who had planned the attack on Pearl Harbor. Holmes was awarded a Navy Cross for his role in the mission, and later earned the Distinguished Flying Cross (with two oak leaf clusters) and an Air Medal.

Holmes, a native of San Francisco, graduated from Balboa High School and City College of San Francisco. He enlisted in March 1941, and was present in Pearl Harbor during the attack of December 7, 1941. He remained in the military until 1968, also serving in the Korean War and Vietnam War. He lived in San Rafael, California, following his retirement. He was inducted by the Commemorative Air Force to the Combat Airman Hall of Fame in 2003.

Holmes died of a stroke in 2006 at Marin General Hospital in Greenbrae, California. He was survived by his wife and four children. He is interred at Golden Gate National Cemetery.
