= Harold R. Mazza =

American Commander 1912–1956)

Harold Ralph Mazza
- Born: November 15, 1912; Petaluma, California, U.S.
- Died: June 24, 1956 (aged 43); Burlingame, California, U.S.
- Burial place: Golden Gate National Cemetery
- Military career
- Allegiance: United States
- Branch: United States Navy
- Service years: 1939-1950
- Rank: Commander
- Conflicts: World War II
- Awards: Navy Cross (4); Silver Star; Distinguished Flying Cross; Air Medal (4)

Commander Harold Ralph Mazza (November 15, 1912 – June 24, 1956) was an American officer in the United States Navy and the recipient of four Navy Crosses, the United States naval services' second highest decoration for valor. Mazza was awarded these military decorations while serving as a naval aviator in the Pacific during World War II. He was one of the most decorated Navy fliers of the war, and the only aviator to win four Navy Crosses.

== Early life and family ==
Mazza was born in Petaluma, California on November 15, 1912, to Dr. Joseph R. Mazza, a Marin County native and dentist, and Elvira Filippini Mazza. An older brother, Elmer, was born in 1909. Mazza likely got his interest in aviation from his brother, who obtained his pilot’s license at age 18 in 1927. Elmer Mazza later bought an airplane and created a landing strip on the family ranch.

In high school Harold Mazza played football, competed in shot put and discus on the track team, and picked up the nickname “Buck”, which followed him into his Navy career. After high school, he attended Santa Rosa Junior College, followed by the University of San Francisco (USF). He played football throughout his college years and in his senior year at USF he was named the team captain.

== Naval career ==
Mazza enlisted in the Navy in 1939, doing his flight training at Naval Air Station Pensacola and was commissioned as an officer in the Navy Air Corps. He was then assigned to the aircraft carrier USS Lexington as a torpedo bomber pilot in February 1941, as part of torpedo squadron VT-2.

Mazza flew his first combat mission from the Lexington on March 10, 1942, piloting a TBD Devastator torpedo bomber in an attack on Japanese forces in New Guinea. The attack sank four Japanese ships and crippled nine others. Mazza was awarded the first of his four Navy Crosses for his actions in the attack.

On May 8, 1942, in the Battle of the Coral Sea, Mazza earned his second Navy Cross for his part in a torpedo attack on the Japanese aircraft carrier Shōkaku, severely damaging it. On returning to the Lexington, Mazza and his crew found the front of the ship engulfed in flames, from an attack by the Shōkaku's aircraft. He was able to land on the aft deck, but within minutes they realized the ship would sink. He and another sailor removed the life raft that was stored in his plane, inflated it, threw it over the side, and were able to jump into the sea, board the raft, and were eventually rescued.

Following this, he was assigned again to Florida, where he spent two years training new torpedo bomber pilots. In late 1944, Mazza was transferred to Hawaii, where he continued to train pilots, then assumed command of torpedo squadron VT-47. The squadron flew new TBM Avenger bombers, and was assigned to the light carrier USS Bataan.

During his service on the USS Bataan, Mazza was in frequent combat. In 1945 he earned two more Navy Crosses, a Silver Star, a Distinguished Flying Cross, and four Air Medals. On April 7, 1945, Mazza earned his third Navy Cross for his part in the aerial attack and sinking of the Japanese battleship Yamato, the heaviest and most powerful battleship ever constructed. He later took part in dozens of air strikes and bombing runs on the Japanese mainland, and won his fourth Navy Cross for two successful bombing missions on July 28, 1945. Mazza is one of only nine individuals to win four or more Navy Crosses, but he is the only one of the group who was an aviator.

Near the end of the war, Mazza flew missions to drop relief bundles to POW camps in the Tokyo area. He was also on air patrol of Tokyo Bay during the surrender ceremonies on September 2, 1945. Mazza briefly left the Navy after the surrender, but he rejoined and in 1946 took part in Operation Crossroads, the nuclear weapons tests at Bikini Atoll. His last assignment was Assistant Reserve Coordinator for Air at the Treasure Island Naval Station in San Francisco.

At his separation from the Navy in 1950 he had the rank of Commander.

=== Personal life ===
Mazza married Elaine Altschuler Metcalf of New York on August 5, 1943. They did not have children.

For a time during the war Mazza was roommates with the actor Robert Stack, who also served as a naval officer in the war. Stack achieved fame for portraying FBI agent Eliot Ness on the television series The Untouchables in the early 1960s. Stack later commented on Mazza's character when he described how he portrayed Ness:

"My concept of Ness was actually a composite of the three bravest men I ever met,” said Stack. “(Medal of Honor winner) Audie Murphy was one – taciturn, almost shy and a one-man army. Buck Mazza was my roomie in the Navy, and as a bomber pilot became the most decorated pilot in the fleet. The third was a stuntman named Carey Loftin. All three men had one thing in common. They were the best in their fields, and they never boasted."

Mazza died of a heart attack at his home in Burlingame, California on June 24, 1956, at the age of 43. He is buried in Golden Gate National Cemetery in San Mateo County.

== Military awards and decorations ==
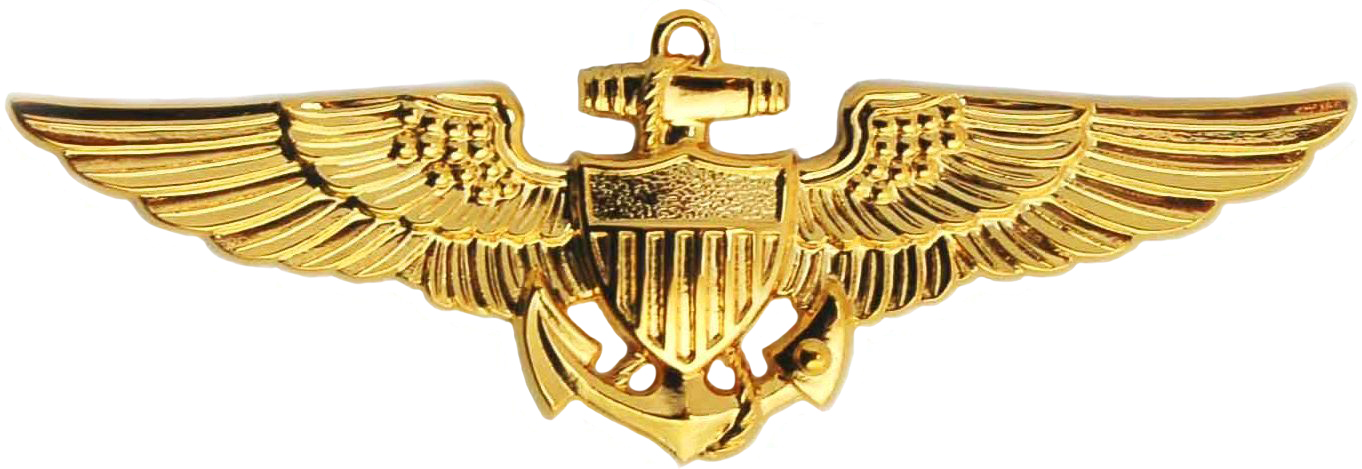
Naval Aviator Badge

Navy Cross with three 5/16" Gold stars
Silver Star Medal
Distinguished Flying Cross
Air Medal with three 5/16" Gold stars

=== Navy Cross citations ===
==== First ====
Awarded: April 27, 1942

For extraordinary heroism in operations against the enemy while serving as Pilot of a carrier-based Navy Torpedo Plane in Torpedo Squadron TWO (VT-2), attached to the U.S.S. LEXINGTON (CV-2), in action against enemy Japanese forces over enemy-controlled waters near Lae and Salamaua, New Guinea on 10 March 1942. Ensign Mazza participated in a vigorous and determined dive-bombing attack, in the face of heavy anti-aircraft fire, on enemy ships, and as a result of this attack at least one ship was sunk. His outstanding courage, daring airmanship and determined skill were at all times inspiring and in keeping with the highest traditions of the United States Naval Service.

==== Second ====
Awarded: May 8, 1942

For extraordinary heroism in operations against the enemy while serving as Pilot of a carrier-based Navy Torpedo Plane in Torpedo Squadron TWO (VT-2), attached to the U.S.S. LEXINGTON (CV-2), in action against enemy Japanese forces on 8 May 1942, in the Air Battle of the Coral Sea. In spite of heavy anti-aircraft fire and concerted enemy fighter opposition, Ensign Mazza closed to within a few hundred yards of the target to execute a fearless and determined attack. Scoring a hit on an enemy aircraft carrier, he thereby contributed to the severe damage and probable destruction of the vessel and aided materially in the success of the operation. His outstanding courage and determined skill were at all times inspiring and in keeping with the highest traditions of the United States Naval Service

==== Third ====
Awarded: July 6, 1945

For extraordinary heroism in operations against the enemy while serving as Pilot of a carrier-based Navy Torpedo Plane in Torpedo Squadron FORTY-SEVEN (VT-47), attached to the U.S.S. BATAAN (CVL-29), in action on 7 April 1945, while deployed over the East China Sea. His outstanding courage and determined skill were at all times inspiring and in keeping with the highest traditions of the United States Naval Service.

==== Fourth ====
Awarded: September 22, 1945

For extraordinary heroism in operations against the enemy while serving as Pilot of a carrier-based Navy Torpedo Plane and Commanding Officer of Torpedo Squadron FORTY-SEVEN (VT-47), attached to the U.S.S. BATAAN (CVL-29), in action on 28 July 1945, and deployed over Kure, Japan. His outstanding courage and determined skill were at all times inspiring and in keeping with the highest traditions of the United States Naval Service.

== See also ==
- USS Lexington
- USS Bataan
- Japanese battleship Yamato
