= Clarence E. Willard =

American vaudeville performer

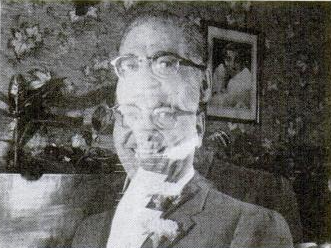
- Photograph of Willard from the December 3, 1956 issue of Life magazine, published with a double exposure effect to show the extent of his "growing" ability.
- Born: 1882
- Died: July 31, 1962 (aged 79); Oakland, California, U.S.
- Occupations: Vaudeville performer, restaurateur
- Known for: Elongation freak act

Clarence E Willard (1882 – July 31, 1962) was an American vaudeville performer. After carrying out stretching exercises, Willard found he was able to increase his height at will by 7 1/2 inches (19 cm) and also elongate his arms and legs. He developed this into a freak show act under the name "The Man Who Grows". From around 1910 Willard performed in vaudeville in the United States and was also claimed to have performed at the Berlin Wintergarten theatre. He became associated with Robert Ripley, performing at the Believe It or Not! odditoriums and appearing in a short film. Willard appeared at the 1936–37 Great Lakes Exposition in Cleveland, Ohio, and later ran a restaurant in Alameda, California.

== Life ==
Clarence E. Willard was born in 1882 and lived in Painesville, Ohio. He claimed to be a relative of the painter Archibald Willard.

Clarence Willard found that he was able to increase his height by carrying out certain exercises. The nature of these is unclear, the 1978 Guinness Book of World Records stating it was through "constant practice in muscular manipulation of the vertebrae" while Willard told a 1958 Society of American Magicians meeting that by carrying out stretching exercises, he could separate his hip bones and ribs. He found that through these means he could add 7 1/2 inches (19 cm) to his natural height of 5 feet 9 3/4 inches (177 cm); he was also able to extend the length of his arms by 8–15 inches (20–38 cm) and make one leg 4 inches (10 cm) longer than the other.

Willard used his ability to become a freak act vaudeville entertainer from around 1910, billed as "The Man Who Grows". Willard's was described as the best of a number of elongation freak show acts of the period. He used no trickery in his act and the elongation achieved was real, though he sometimes used optical illusions to enhance the effect. Part of his act was to call out for a volunteer from the audience to stand next to him while he would increase in height. He also performed card tricks. Willard performed vaudeville until at least 1914 and at one point performed in Germany, being later billed as "the star attraction of the Wintergarten, Berlin".

Willard later became associated with Robert Ripley and his Ripley's Believe It or Not! franchise. Willard was one of "Ripley's Strange People in Person", a group of freak act performers who appeared at Ripley's odditoriums and could be contracted for appearances across the United States and Canada through the NBC Artists' Service. Willard appeared in the 1930 short film (Robert L. Ripley in) Believe it or Not #3, introduced by Ripley when challenged (in the film's story) by a journalist to prove the quality of his acts.

Willard performed at the 1936–37 Great Lakes Exposition in Cleveland, Ohio. A letter to Life magazine on December 3, 1956, stated that Willard had moved to Alameda, California, where he ran a restaurant named the Brass Rail and continued to perform his elongation tricks for customers. Willard was a friend of fellow California resident, the astrologer Sydney Omarr. Willard died on July 31, 1962, at a hospital in Oakland, California and was buried at Golden Gate National Cemetery.
