= Operation Zahnarzt =

Unsuccessful German counter-offensive on the western front

Operation Zahnarzt (literally "Operation Dentist") was a plan by the Germans to eliminate Lieutenant General George S. Patton's Third Army during World War II.

By 21 December 1944, the German momentum during the Battle of the Bulge had begun to dissipate. The intent of Operation Nordwind, launched on 31 December, had been to punch through the lines of the Seventh United States Army and the French First Army (which had extended their lines and assumed a defensive posture to cover the departure of forces from the Third Army to the north to counterattack the German offensive) and capture Strasbourg. Operation Zahnarzt was to immediately follow Nordwind, which likewise had stalled against fierce Allied resistance.

The intention of Operation Zahnarzt was to create a pincer movement that would encircle and destroy the Third Army. Preliminary and small-scale attacks began shortly before and during Operation Nordwind. In the days that followed, the Germans saw their small advances continually eroded by repeated counterattacks from Major General Robert L. Spragins’ US 44th Infantry Division, Major General Withers A. Burress’s US 100th Infantry Division, and Major General Louis E. Hibbs’ US 63rd Infantry Division. They were supported by the French 2nd Armored Division. Allied artillery and air attacks (when the weather broke), together with the harshness of the weather, also diminished the momentum of the Germans by cutting off their already-thin supply lines. Thus, the Germans were forced to call off the operation on January 4. Zahnarzt was one of the last planned major offensives by the Germans during the war.
