= William Russel Huber =

United States Navy sailor

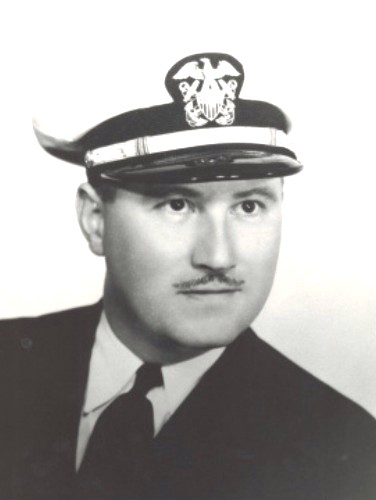
- Born: July 16, 1902; Harrisburg, Pennsylvania, U.S.
- Died: January 25, 1982 (aged 78); San Mateo, California, U.S.
- Burial place: Golden Gate National Cemetery
- Military career
- Allegiance: United States
- Branch: United States Navy
- Service years: 1920 - 1948
- Rank: Lieutenant
- Unit: USS Bruce
- Awards: Medal of Honor

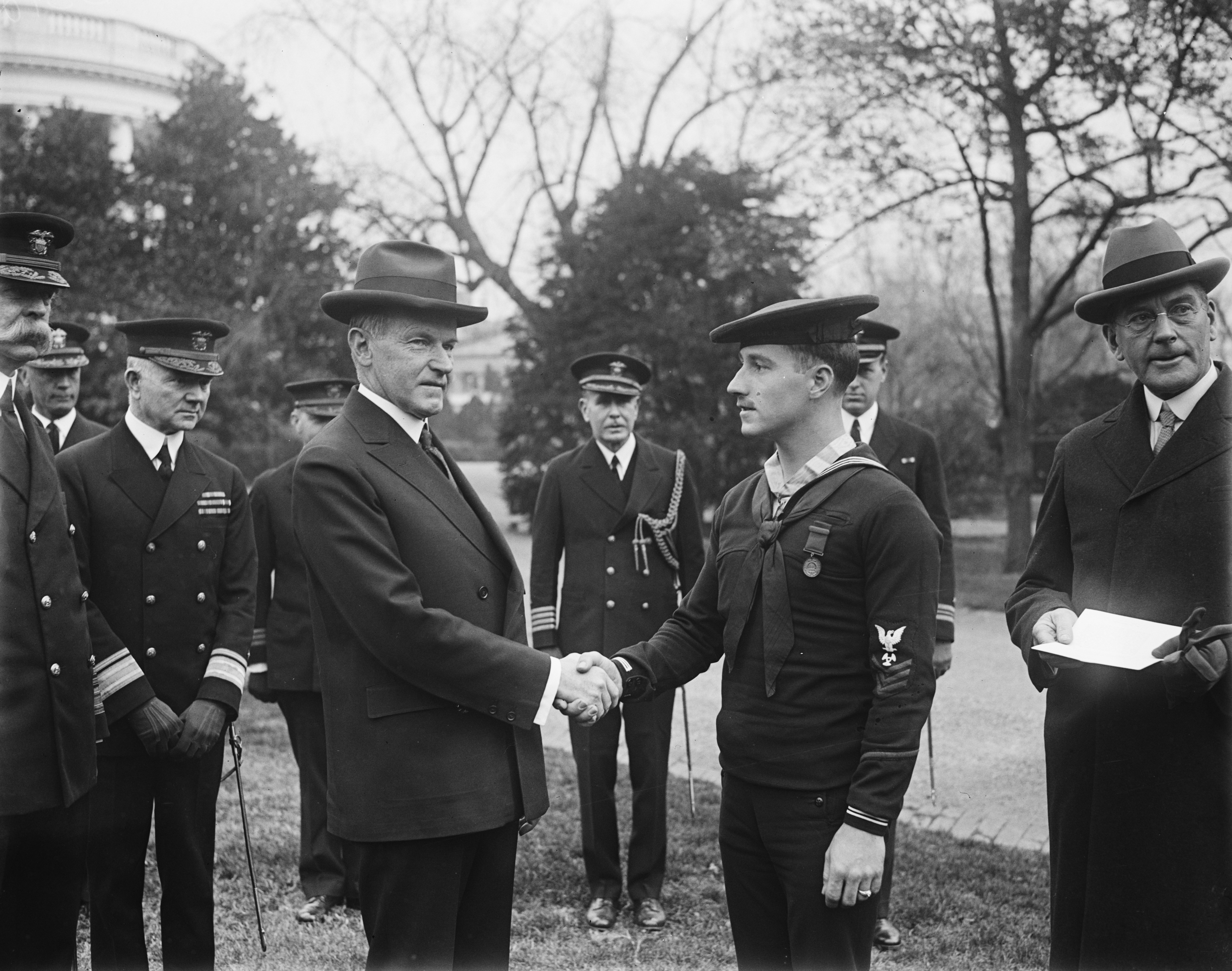
Huber receives the Medal of Honor from President Calvin Coolidge (1928)

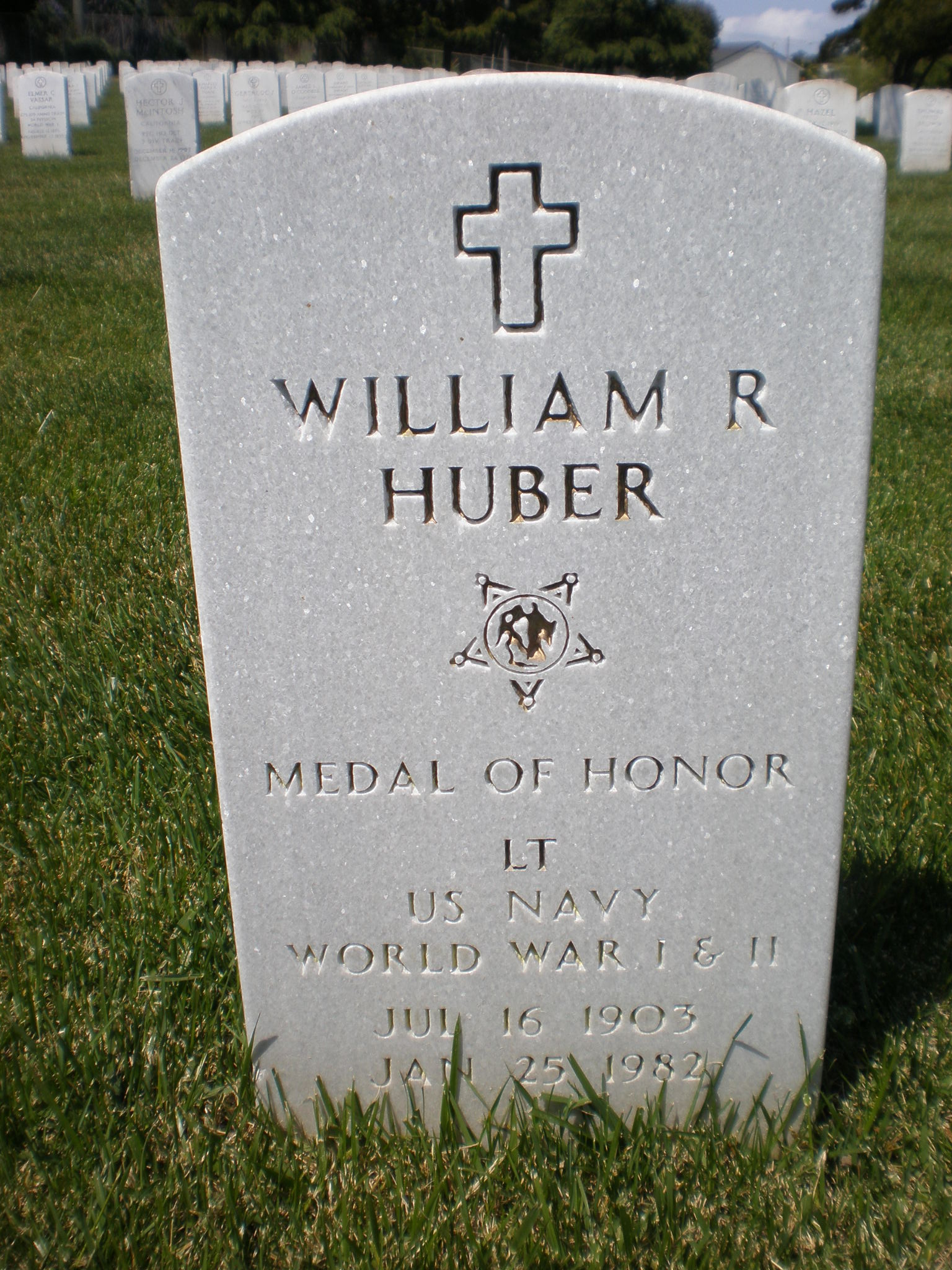
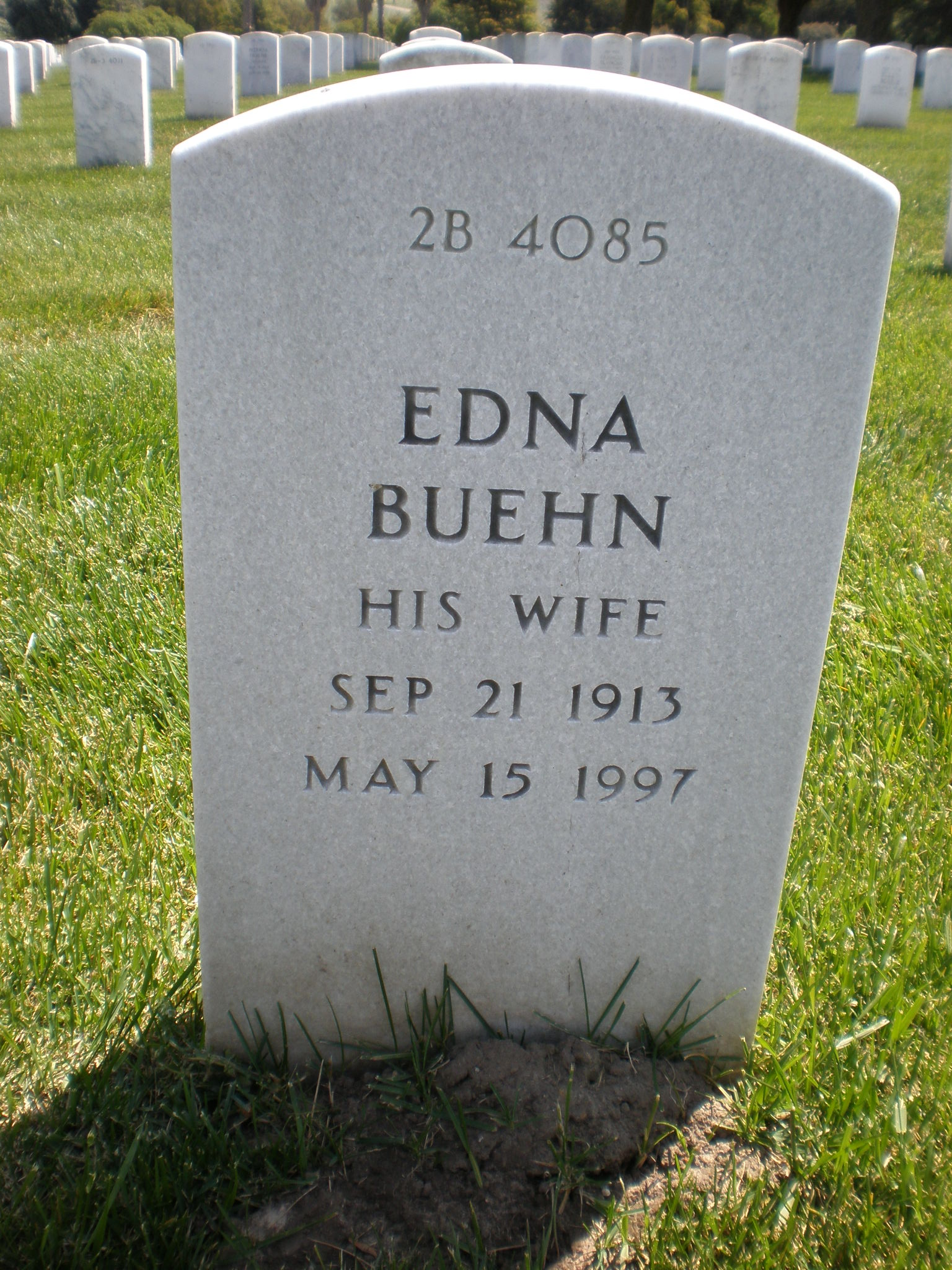
Huber's grave alongside his wife at Golden Gate National Cemetery in San Bruno, California

William Russel Huber (June 16, 1902 – January 25, 1982), a native of Harrisburg, Pennsylvania, was a United States Navy sailor who received the Medal of Honor for heroism on June 11, 1928.

== Naval service ==
Huber enlisted in the United States Navy in Philadelphia, Pennsylvania on September 14, 1920. He had risen to the rate of Machinist Mate First Class by the time he received the Medal of Honor in 1928.

After receiving the Medal of Honor, Huber stayed in the Navy and served throughout World War II. He was promoted to the warrant officer rank of machinist on 23 July 1942 and assigned to the repair ship USS Medusa stationed at Pearl Harbor. He was promoted to lieutenant (junior grade) on 1 May 1943 and to lieutenant on 1 July 1944. He retired from the Navy with the rank of Lieutenant on June 1, 1948. In retirement he lived in San Mateo, California.

== Death and burial ==
Huber died on January 25, 1982, and is buried in the Golden Gate National Cemetery in California. (Despite his headstone listing his year of birth as 1903, all official documents related to Huber's Navy service give his year of birth as 1902.)

== Medal of Honor citation ==
For display of heroism in the line of his profession on 11 June 1928, after a boiler accident on the U.S.S. Bruce, then at the Naval Shipyard, Norfolk, VA. After becoming aware of the accident, Huber without hesitation entered the steam-filled fire room and at risk to his life succeeded in carrying Charles H. Byran to safety. Although having received severe and dangerous burns about the arms and neck, he descended with a view toward rendering further assistance. The courage, grit, and determination displayed by Huber on this occasion characterized conduct beyond the call of duty.

== Awards ==
- Medal of Honor
- Good Conduct Medal
- American Defense Service Medal
- American Campaign Medal
- Asiatic-Pacific Campaign Medal
- World War II Victory Medal

== See also ==
- List of Medal of Honor recipients
