= John Olof Dahlgren =

United States Marine Corps Medal of Honor recipient

- Dahlgren c. 1951
- Born: September 14, 1872; Kalmar, Sweden
- Died: February 11, 1963 (aged 90); Vallejo, California, U.S.
- Burial place: Golden Gate National Cemetery San Bruno, California, United States
- Military career
- Allegiance: United States
- Branch: United States Marine Corps
- Service years: 1896–1901
- Rank: Corporal
- Conflicts: Boxer Rebellion
- Awards: Medal of Honor

John Olof Dahlgren (September 14, 1872 – February 11, 1963) was an American corporal serving in the United States Marine Corps during the Boxer Rebellion who received the Medal of Honor for bravery.

== Biography ==
Dahlgren was born September 14, 1872, in Kalmar, Sweden and after entering the Marine Corps he was sent to fight in the Chinese Boxer Rebellion.

He received the Medal of Honor for his actions in Peking, China from June 20 – July 16, 1900 and it was presented to him July 19, 1901.

He died February 11, 1963, and is buried in Golden Gate National Cemetery, San Bruno, California.

== Medal of Honor citation ==
Rank and organization: Corporal, U.S. Marine Corps. Born: September 14, 1872, Kalmar, Sweden. Accredited to: California. G.O. No.: 55, July 19, 1901.

Citation:

In the presence of the enemy during the battle of Peking, China, 20 June to 16 July 1900, Dahlgren distinguished himself by meritorious conduct.

== See also ==
- List of Medal of Honor recipients
- List of Medal of Honor recipients for the Boxer Rebellion
