= Hugh P. Mullin =

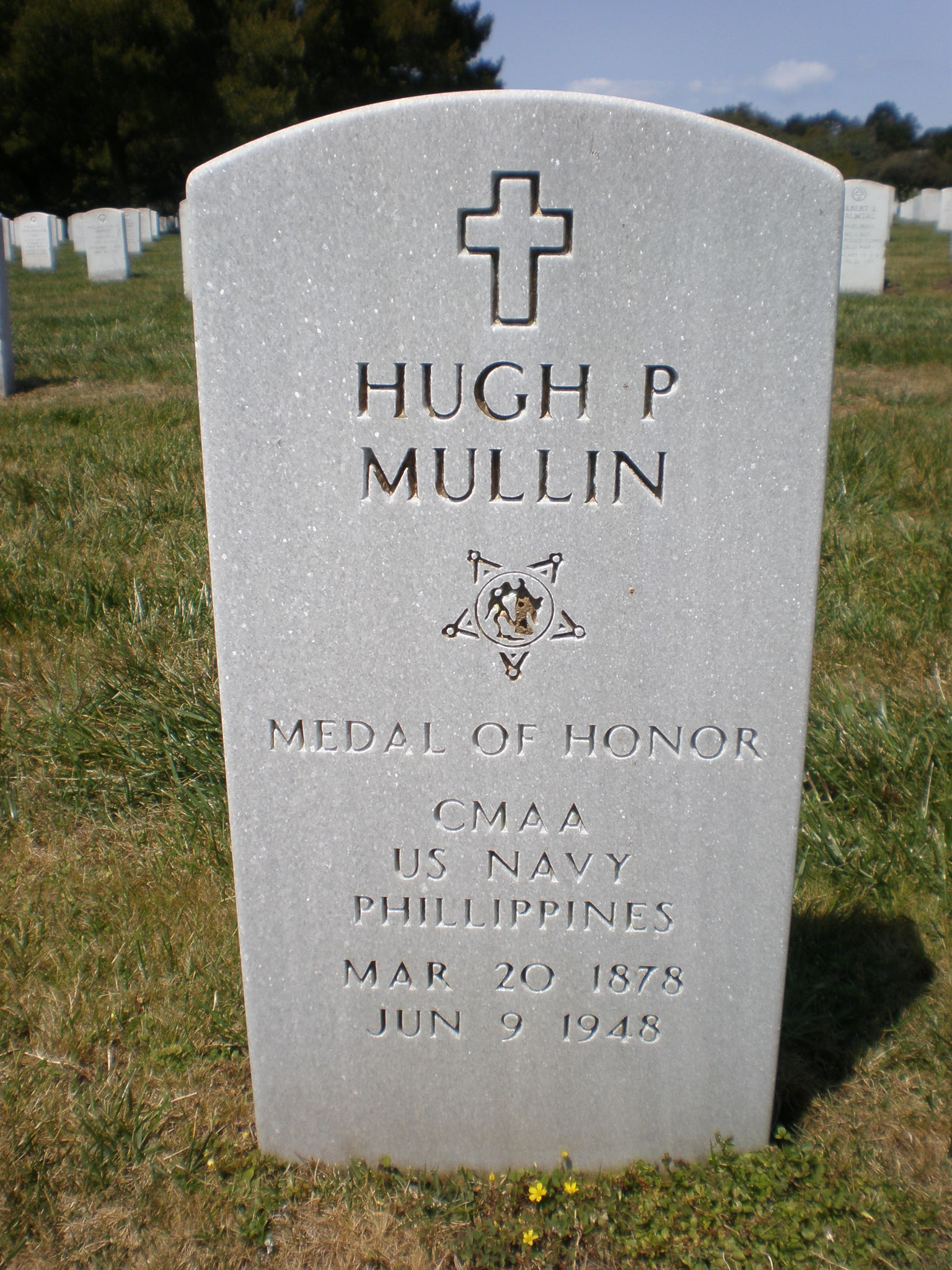
- Mullin's grave marker at Golden Gate National Cemetery
- Born: Hugh Patrick Mullin; March 20, 1878; Richmond, Illinois, U.S.
- Died: June 9, 1948 (aged 70)
- Burial place: Golden Gate National Cemetery
- Military career
- Allegiance: United States
- Branch: United States Navy
- Rank: Chief Master at Arms
- Unit: USS Texas
- Conflicts: Philippine–American War
- Awards: Medal of Honor

Hugh Patrick Mullin (March 20, 1878 – June 9, 1948) was a Seaman in the United States Navy and a Medal of Honor recipient.

== Medal of Honor citation ==
Rank and organization: Seaman, U.S. Navy. Born: March 20, 1878, Richmond, Ill. Accredited to: Illinois. G.O. No.: 537, January 8, 1900.

Citation:

On board the U.S.S. Texas during the coaling of that vessel at Hampton Roads, Va., 11 November 1899. Jumping overboard while wearing a pair of heavy rubber boots and at great risk to himself, Mullin rescued Alfred Kosminski, apprentice, second class, who fell overboard, by supporting him until he was safely hauled from the water.

== Career ==
Mullin served in the Philippines and rose to the rank of Chief Master at Arms.

He died in Fresno, California.

== See also ==
- List of Medal of Honor recipients during peacetime
