= Robert H. Young =

United States Army Medal of Honor recipient

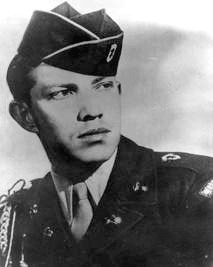
- Robert H Young
- Born: Robert Harley Young; March 4, 1929; Oroville, California, U.S.
- Died: November 5, 1950 (aged 21) near Kaesong, Korea
- Burial place: Golden Gate National Cemetery San Bruno, California
- Military career
- Allegiance: United States
- Branch: United States Army
- Service years: 1946 - 1950
- Rank: Corporal (posthumous)
- Units: Company E, 8th Cavalry Regiment, 1st Cavalry Division
- Conflicts: Korean War †
- Awards: Medal of Honor; Purple Heart

Robert Harley Young (March 4, 1929 – November 5, 1950) was a soldier in the United States Army during the Korean War. He joined the Army from Vallejo, California in 1946. Young posthumously received the Medal of Honor for his actions on October 9, 1950, during the UN offensive into North Korea, and was promoted to the rank of Corporal. Young is buried at Golden Gate National Cemetery in San Bruno, California.

== Medal of Honor citation ==
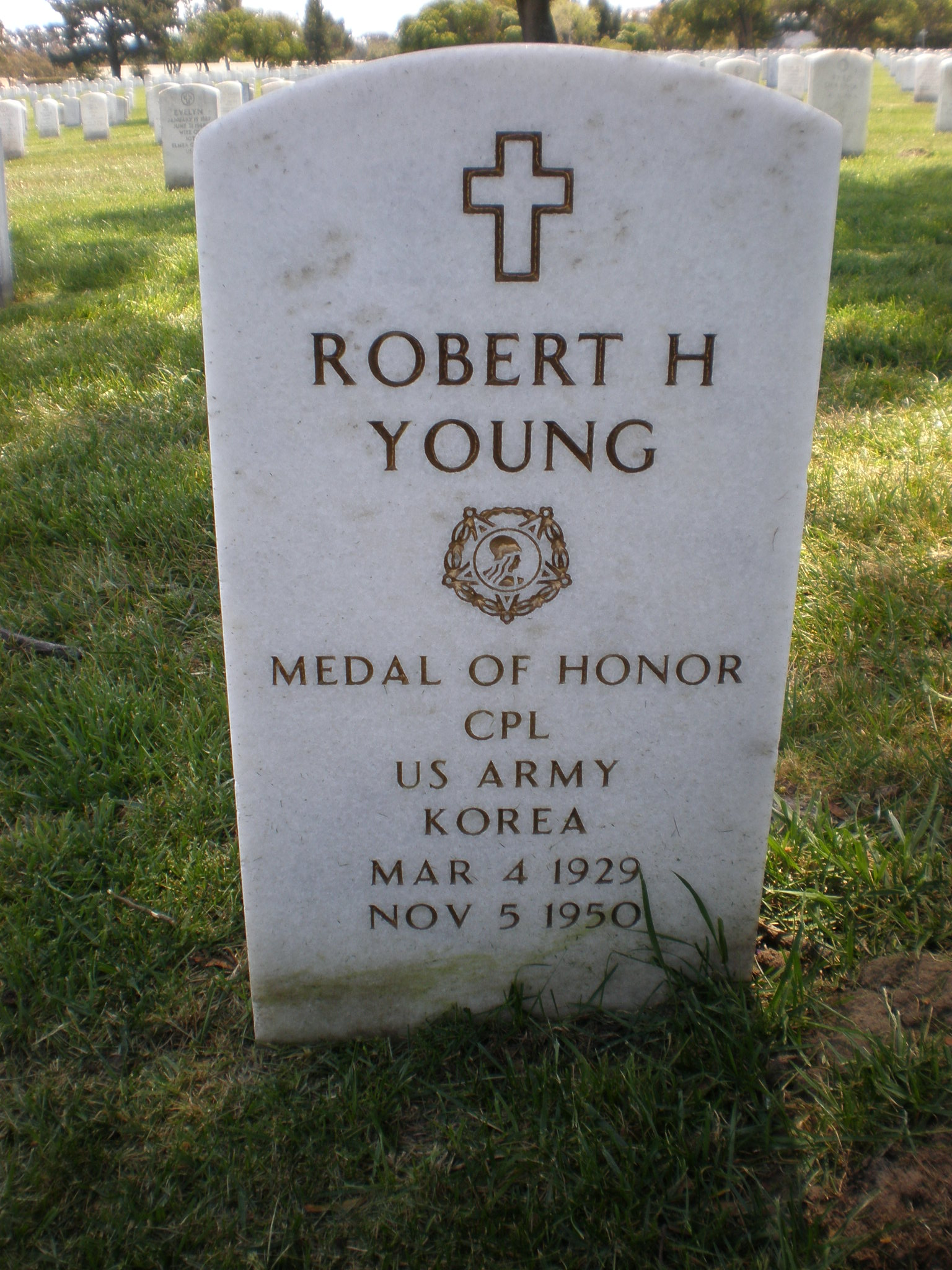
Young's grave at Golden Gate National Cemetery

Rank and organization: Private First Class, U.S. Army, Company E, 8th Cavalry Regiment, 1st Cavalry Division

Place and date: North of Kaesong, Korea, October 9, 1950

Entered service at: Vallejo, Calif. Born: March 4, 1929, Oroville, California

G.O. No.: 65, August 2, 1951

Citation:

Pfc. Young distinguished himself by conspicuous gallantry and intrepidity above and beyond the call of duty in action. His company, spearheading a battalion drive deep in enemy territory, suddenly came under a devastating barrage of enemy mortar and automatic weapons crossfire which inflicted heavy casualties among his comrades and wounded him in the face and shoulder. Refusing to be evacuated, Pfc. Young remained in position and continued to fire at the enemy until wounded a second time. As he awaited first aid near the company command post the enemy attempted an enveloping movement. Disregarding medical treatment he took an exposed position and firing with deadly accuracy killed 5 of the enemy. During this action he was again hit by hostile fire which knocked him to the ground and destroyed his helmet. Later when supporting tanks moved forward, Pfc. Young, his wounds still unattended, directed tank fire which destroyed 3 enemy gun positions and enabled the company to advance. Wounded again by an enemy mortar burst, and while aiding several of his injured comrades, he demanded that all others be evacuated first. Throughout the course of this action the leadership and combative instinct displayed by Pfc. Young exerted a profound influence on the conduct of the company. His aggressive example affected the whole course of the action and was responsible for its success. Pfc. Young's dauntless courage and intrepidity reflect the highest credit upon himself and uphold the esteemed traditions of the U.S. Army.

== Awards and decorations ==

Badge	Combat Infantryman Badge		
1st row	Medal of Honor		Purple Heart
2nd row	Army Good Conduct Medal	World War II Victory Medal	National Defense Service Medal
3rd row	Korean Service Medal with 2 Campaign stars	United Nations Service Medal Korea	Korean War Service Medal Retroactively Awarded, 2003
Unit awards	Korean Presidential Unit Citation		

1st Cavalry Division Insignia

== See also ==
- List of Medal of Honor recipients
- List of Korean War Medal of Honor recipients
