= John C. F. Tillson =

United States Army general (1915–2001)

John C. F. Tillson III
- Born: February 12, 1915; Fort Huachuca, Arizona, United States
- Died: June 6, 2001 (aged 86); Augusta, Georgia, United States
- Military career
- Allegiance: United States of America
- Branch: United States Army
- Service years: 1938–1971
- Rank: Major General
- Commands: 25th Infantry Division
- Conflicts: World War II; Vietnam War
- Awards: Distinguished Service Medal; Silver Star

John Charles Fremont Tillson III (February 12, 1915 – June 6, 2001) was a United States Army Major General who served as commander of the 25th Infantry Division during the Vietnam War.

== Military service ==
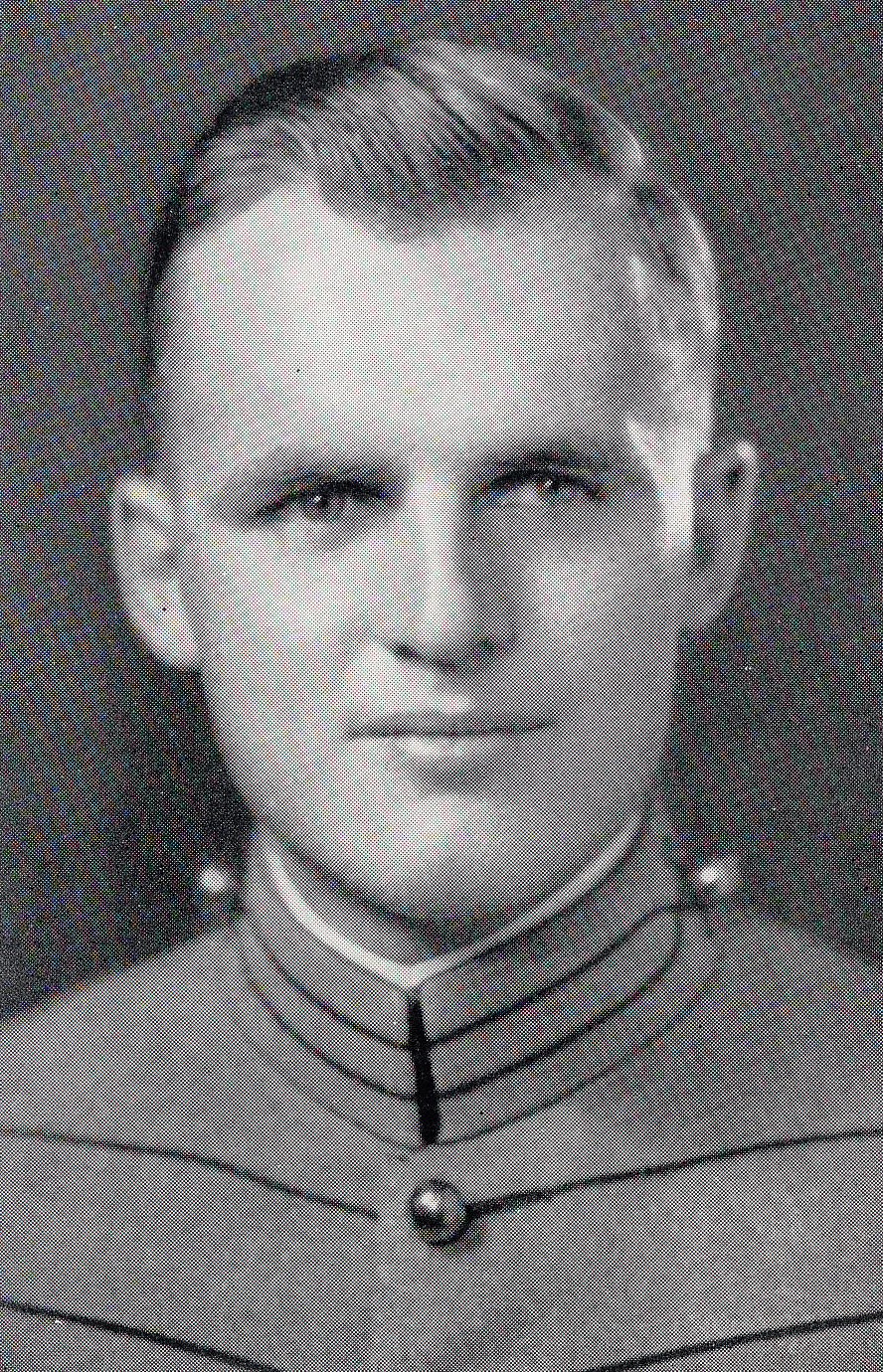
Tillson as a United States Military Academy cadet c. 1938

He graduated from West Point as a Second Lieutenant in 1938 and joined the 1st Cavalry Division at Fort Bliss.

=== World War II ===
In 1942 he took command of the 8th Cavalry Regiment and then commanded the 12th Cavalry Regiment. Later that year he was given command of the reconnaissance troop of the 95th Infantry Division.

In April 1943 he was assigned as Operations Officer of the 42nd Infantry Division and served with that division in the European theatre.

=== Post WWII ===
He commanded the 1st Battalion, 5th Infantry Regiment, the 1st Battalion, 16th Infantry Regiment and the 242nd Infantry Regiment during the Allied occupation of Austria.

From 1953 to 1954 he commanded the 2nd Armored Cavalry Regiment in West Germany.

In 1955 he attended the Army War College.

From 1958 to 1960 he worked at The Pentagon, first in the Civil Affairs Directorate and then as Special Assistant to the Director, Joint Staff.

In 1960 he served as operations officer for I Corps in South Korea.

In 1961 he served as Senior Army Advisor at the Naval War College.

In 1963, as a brigadier general, he was Deputy Commanding General of Fort Dix, NJ.

=== Vietnam War ===
He served as assistant chief of staff, Operations Military Assistance Command, Vietnam from March 1966 until March 1967 when he took over command of the 25th Infantry Division from MG Frederick C. Weyand.

On 6 August 1967 MG Tillson handed over command of the division to MG Fillmore K. Mearns.

=== Post Vietnam ===
In 1968 Tillson took command of the US Army Training Center at Fort Gordon and remained in this post until his retirement from the Army in 1971.
