= Stattmatten =

- Commune
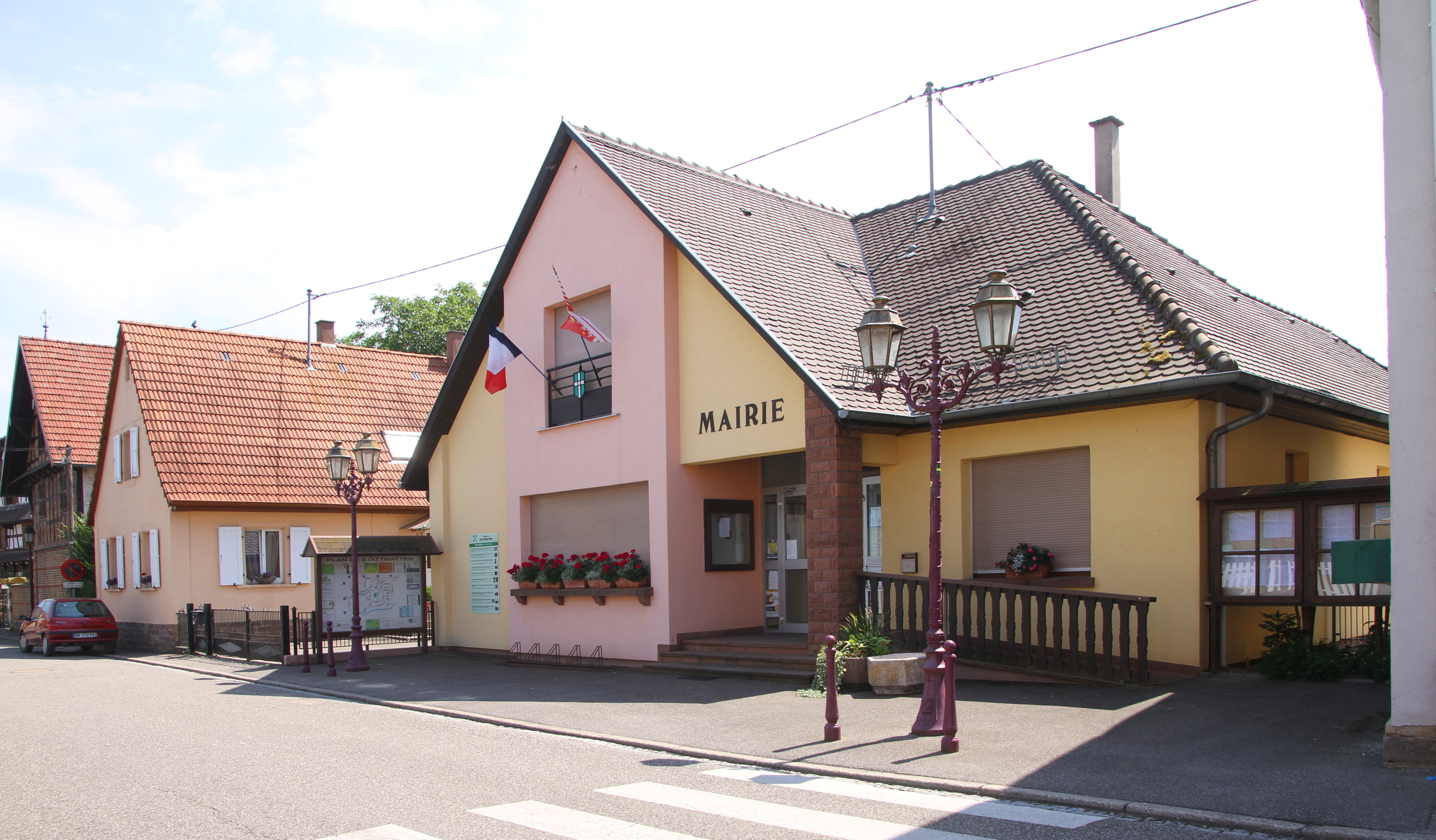
- Mairie

- Coat of arms
- Location of Stattmatten
- Location within France Location within Grand Est
- Coordinates: 48°47′51″N 8°00′12″E
- Country: France
- Region: Grand Est
- Department: Bas-Rhin
- Arrondissement: Haguenau-Wissembourg
- Canton: Bischwiller

Government
  - Mayor (2020–2026): Jean-Jacques Merkel
- Area^{1}: 3.93 km^{2} (1.52 sq mi)
- Highest elevation: 122 m (400 ft)
- Lowest elevation: 116 m (381 ft)
- Population (2023): 744
  - Density: 189/km^{2} (490/sq mi)
- Time zone: UTC+01:00 (CET)
  - Summer (DST): UTC+02:00 (CEST)
- INSEE/Postal code: 67476 /67770
- ^{1} French Land Register data, which excludes lakes, ponds, glaciers > 1 km^{2} (0.386 sq mi or 247 acres) and river estuaries.

Stattmatten (French pronunciation: [ʃtatmatœn]) is a commune in the Bas-Rhin department in Grand Est in north-eastern France.

== See also ==
- Communes of the Bas-Rhin department
