= Hatten, Bas-Rhin =

Hatten Hàtte
- Commune
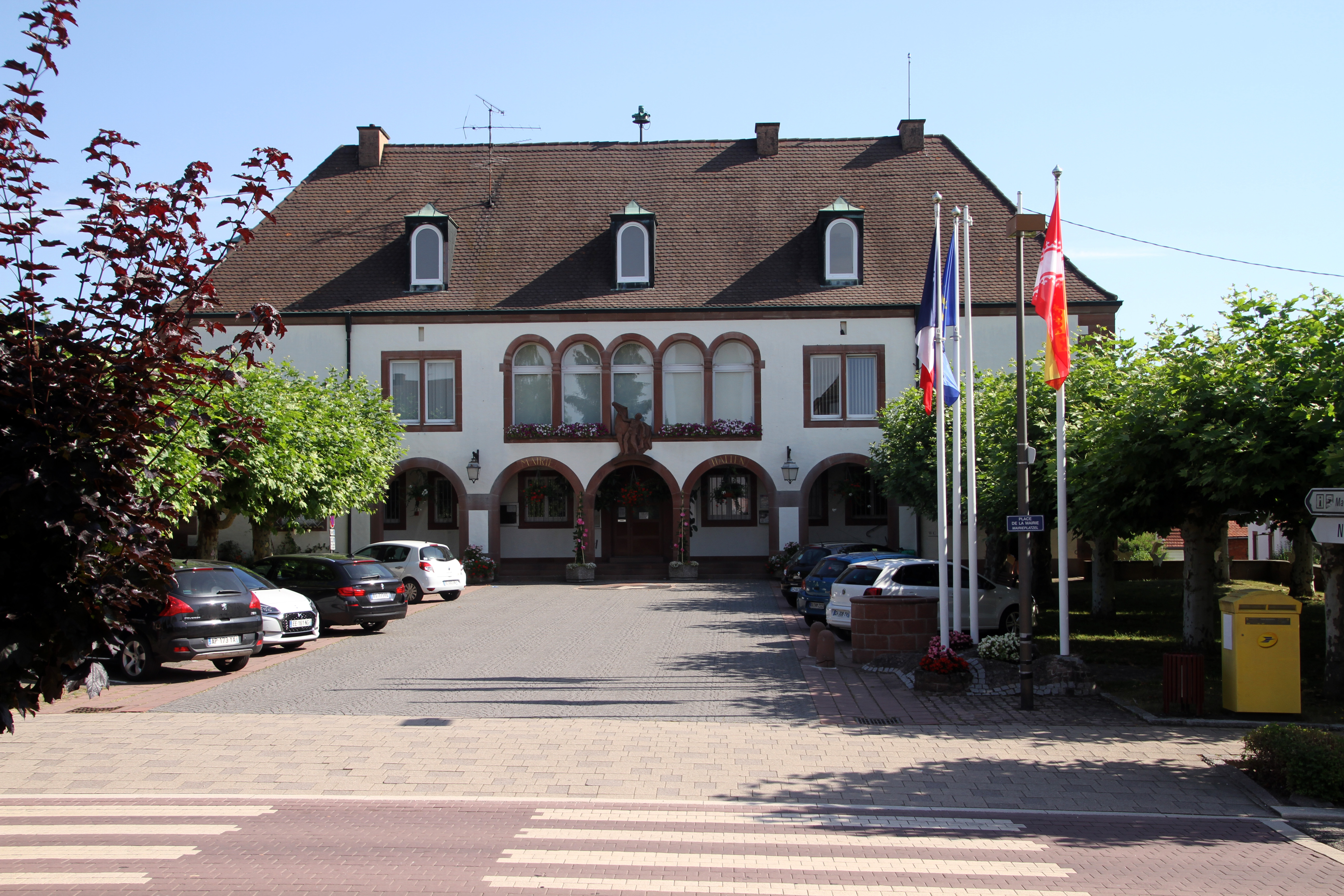
- The town hall in Hatten

- Coat of arms
- Location of Hatten
- Location within France Location within Grand Est
- Coordinates: 48°54′09″N 7°58′47″E
- Country: France
- Region: Grand Est
- Department: Bas-Rhin
- Arrondissement: Haguenau-Wissembourg
- Canton: Wissembourg

Government
  - Mayor (2020–2026): Serge Kraemer
- Area^{1}: 18.91 km^{2} (7.30 sq mi)
- Highest elevation: 172 m (564 ft)
- Lowest elevation: 120 m (390 ft)
- Population (2023): 1,912
  - Density: 101.1/km^{2} (261.9/sq mi)
- Time zone: UTC+01:00 (CET)
  - Summer (DST): UTC+02:00 (CEST)
- INSEE/Postal code: 67184 /67690
- ^{1} French Land Register data, which excludes lakes, ponds, glaciers > 1 km^{2} (0.386 sq mi or 247 acres) and river estuaries.

Hatten (French pronunciation: [atən]; Alsatian: Hàtte) is a commune in the Bas-Rhin department in Grand Est in north-eastern France, some fifteen kilometres (nine miles) to the south of Wissembourg.

== Geography ==
Positioned at the northern edge of the Forest of Hagenau, the village is on the edge of the Alsace Plain, although the agricultural landscape surrounding this village and its immediate neighbors is one of rolling hills.

== History ==
=== Second World War ===
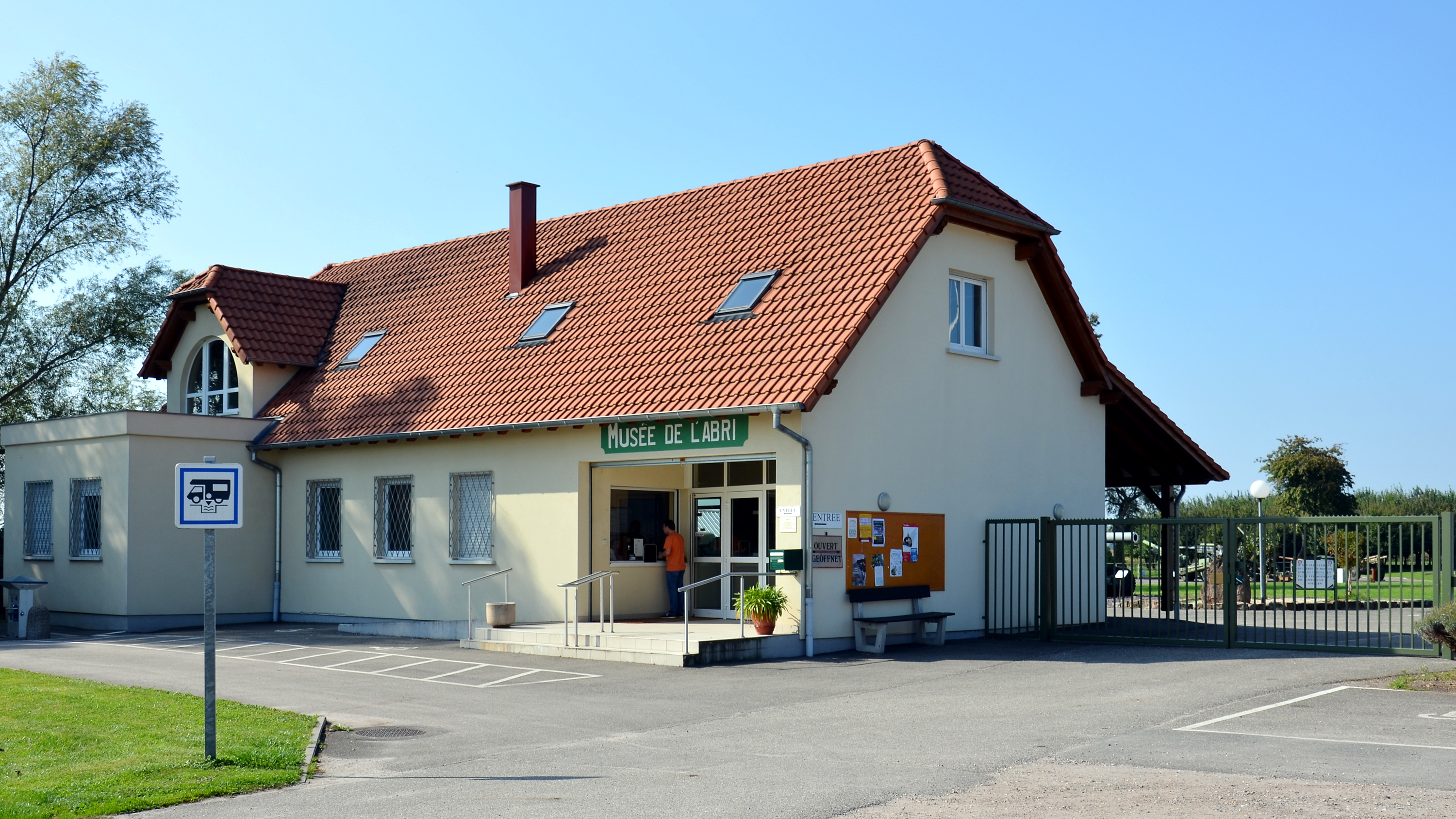
WW II Historical Museum Hatten

In 1939, because Hatten was on the Maginot Line, the authorities had arranged for the town's 1,500 inhabitants to be evacuated to Châteauponsac in the Limousin region, six hundred kilometers to the southwest. Evacuees had been restricted to one suitcase per person, and so were obliged to leave behind most of their possessions. However, after July 1940, the village had survived the invasion of France undamaged; therefore, the residents were able to return to Hatten, since the whole of Alsace had then reverted to its pre-1919 status as a part of Germany. On December 13, 1944, after four years of occupation, the village had been liberated without any fighting by the Americans and the residents looked forward to the resumption of peace.

However, in January 1945, the Germans had launched one of their final counter-offensives under the name of Operation North Wind, with the intention of retaking Strasbourg. Hatten was on the route of the German columns and thus, the village had found itself at the heart of the battle. During the fierce tank battles between the Germans and the Americans that had taken place over the course of twelve days in the middle of January, 350 of the 365 houses which had inhabited the village had been destroyed. Along with 2,500 military deaths, 83 civilians in Hatten had perished. Many US or other allied troops were stationed there and counterattacked the Germans. Many call this part of Battle Of The Bulge. Many of the Allied troops stationed there were not prepared for war. They thought that the front lines would be in Strasbourg and they were just peacekeeping.

The village was rebuilt after the war.

== See also ==
- Communes of the Bas-Rhin department
