= Mosheim Feaster =

American soldier (1867–1950)

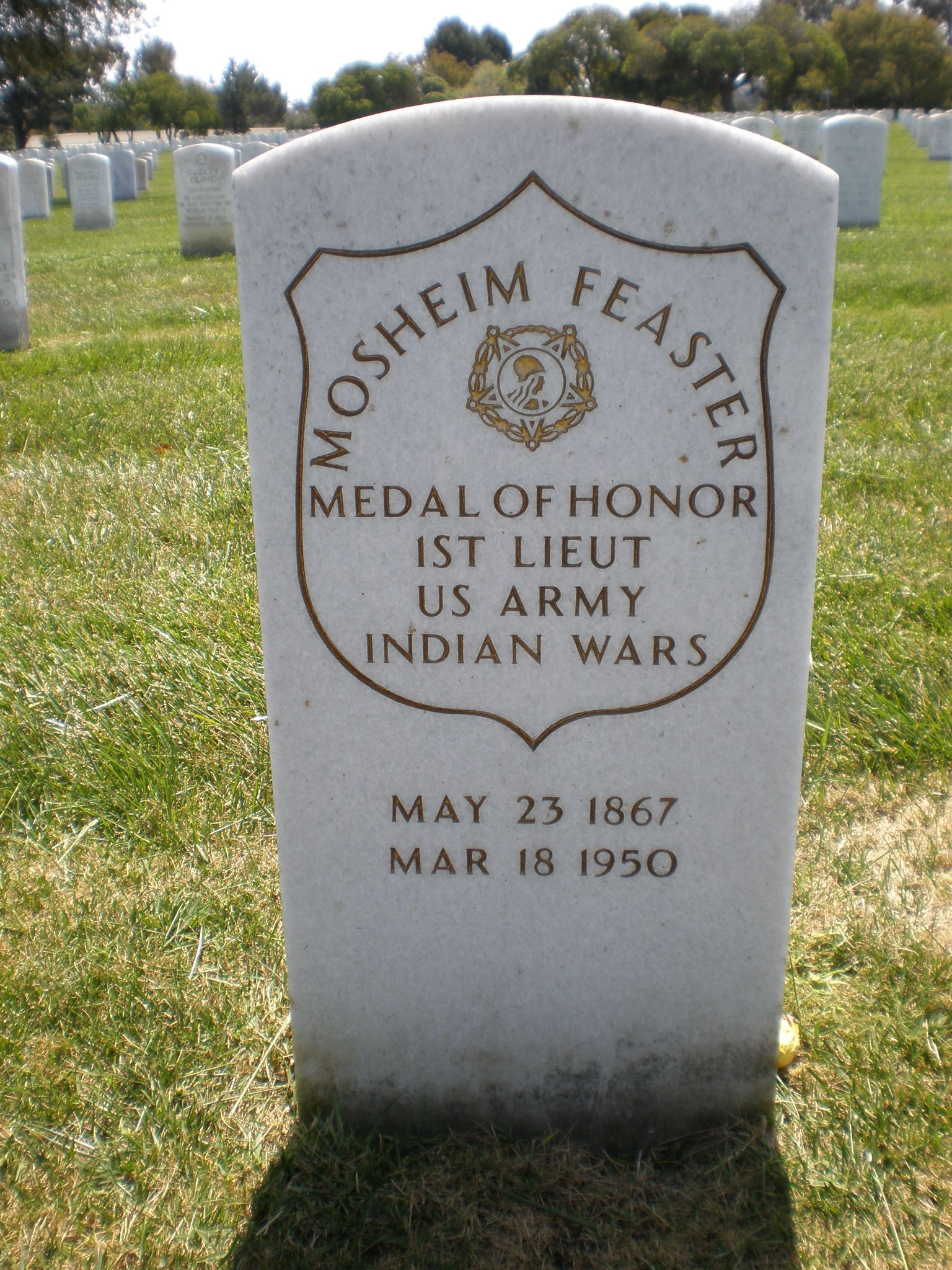
- Feaster grave
- Born: May 27, 1867; Schellsburg, Pennsylvania, United States
- Died: March 18, 1950 (aged 82); San Bruno, California, US
- Burial place: Golden Gate National Cemetery
- Military career
- Allegiance: United States
- Branch: United States Army
- Service years: c. 1889–1914
- Rank: First Sergeant
- Nickname: Frank
- Unit: 7th U.S. Cavalry
- Conflicts: Indian Wars; Wounded Knee Massacre; Spanish–American War
- Awards: Medal of Honor

First Sergeant Mosheim Feaster (May 27, 1867 – March 18, 1950) was an American soldier in the U.S. Army who served with the 7th U.S. Cavalry during the Indian Wars. He was one of nineteen men awarded the Medal of Honor for extraordinary gallantry at the Battle of Wounded Knee, but now called the Wounded Knee Massacre, on December 29, 1890. He later served in the Spanish–American War.

== Biography ==
Mosheim Feaster was born in Schellsburg, Pennsylvania, on May 27, 1867, to Conrad and Mary Feaster. He enlisted in Company E, 7th Cavalry Regiment, U.S. Army on October 23, 1889, in Cleveland, Ohio.

Assigned to frontier duty in the Dakota Territory, Feaster took part in campaigns against the Sioux during the late-1880s. His unit was ordered to bring in the Sioux chief Big Foot, on the morning of December 29, 1890, they surrounded his camp on the banks of Wounded Knee Creek. Although intending to place Big Foot under arrest and disarm his followers, fighting broke out resulting in what was then called the Battle of Wounded Knee (now known as the Wounded Knee Massacre). Feaster was cited for "extraordinary gallantry" during the battle by advancing to an exposed position and holding it under heavy fire. He was one of nineteen soldiers who received the Medal of Honor for his actions. Feaster was discharged as a private on June 22, 1893, at Fort Riley, Kansas.

Feaster re-enlisted on October 9, 1893, at Cleveland in Company E, 10th Infantry Regiment, U.S. Army. On July 1, 1898, Feaster, a sergeant, performed gallantly "gallantry in advancing beyond the general line in the Battle of Santiago de Cuba. On October 8, 1898, he was discharged as a sergeant at Bedloe's Island, New York upon termination of his service.

On December 5, 1898, Feaster re-enlisted in Company E or Company H, 3rd U.S. Infantry Regiment, again in Cleveland. While a corporal during this enlistment, he was cited for his action in Cuba. He was discharged as a first sergeant when his service expired on December 4, 1901.

Feaster served at least four more tours of duty:

1. Enlisting February 14, 1902, in Chicago, Illinois, in Company M, 4th Infantry Regiment and being discharged on February 23, 1905, at Angel Island, California, as a private.
2. Enlistling February 25, 1905, in San Francisco, California, in Company M of an infantry Regiment and being discharged on February 24, 1908, at Chicago as a corporal
3. Enlisting March 5, 1908, in Chicago in the recruiting service for the infantry and being discharged on March 4, 1911, at Chicago as a sergeant.
4. Enlisting March 18, 1911, at the Presidio of Monterey, California in Company K, 8th Infantry Regiment and being discharged on March 14, 1914, at Fort Santiago, Manila, Philippine Islands as a sergeant.

Feaster probably re-enlisted upon discharge in March 1914; in September 1914 First Sergeant Feaster, still assigned to Company K, was placed on the retired list.

Feaster died on March 18, 1950, in San Mateo, California. His grave marker shows his rank as first lieutenant. His record in the Veterans Administration Nationwide Gravesite Locator reflects a rank of first sergeant.

== Medal of Honor citation ==

Rank and organization: Private, Company E, 7th U.S. Cavalry. Place and date: At Wounded Knee Creek, S. Dak., December 29, 1890. Entered service at: Schellburg, Pa. Birth: Schellburg, Pa. Date of issue: June 23, 1891.

Citation:

The President of the United States of America, in the name of Congress, takes pleasure in presenting the Medal of Honor to Private Mosheim Feaster, United States Army, for extraordinary gallantry on December 29, 1890, while serving with Company E, 7th U.S. Cavalry, in action at Wounded Knee Creek, South Dakota.

== See also ==
- List of Medal of Honor recipients for the Indian Wars
