= Operation Northwind (1944) =

German military offensive

- Part of the Western Front of World War II
Date	31 December 1944 – 25 January 1945
Location	Alsace and Lorraine, France and Rhineland-Palatinate, Germany
Result	Allied victory

Belligerents
United States France	Germany

Commanders and leaders
(United States) Jacob L. Devers; (United States) Alexander Patch; (United States) Edward H. Brooks; (Provisional Government of the French Republic) Jean d.L. de Tassigny; (Provisional Government of the French Republic) Joseph de Monsabert	(Nazi Germany) Johannes Blaskowitz; (Nazi Germany) Hans von Obstfelder; (Nazi Germany) Heinrich Himmler; (Nazi Germany) Siegfried Rasp

Units involved
(United States) Seventh Army VI Corps: 42nd Infantry Division; 45th Infantry Division; 70th Infantry Division; 79th Infantry Division; XV Corps: 103rd Infantry Division; 44th Infantry Division; 100th Infantry Division; 63rd Infantry Division; XXI Corps: 36th Infantry Division; 12th Armored Division; 14th Armored Division; (Provisional Government of the French Republic) First Army I Corps: 1st Infantry Division; 2nd Armored Division; 3rd Algerian Division; II Corps: 1st Armored Division; 1st Colonial Division; 3rd Moroccan Division; 4th Moroccan Division; 5th Armored Division; 10th Infantry Division	(Nazi Germany) 1st Army: 25th Panzergrenadier Division; 21st Panzer Division; 6th SS Mountain Division; XIII SS Corps: 19th Volksgrenadier Division; 36th Volksgrenadier Division; 17th SS Panzergrenadier Division; XC Corps: 559th Volksgrenadier Division; 257th Volksgrenadier Division; LXXXIX Corps: 361st Volksgrenadier Division; 245th Infantry Division; 256th Volksgrenadier Division; (Nazi Germany) 19th Army: 10th SS Panzer Division; LXIV Corps: 189th Infantry Division; 198th Infantry Division; 708th Volksgrenadier Division; LXIII Corps: 159th Infantry Division; 716th Infantry Division; 269th Infantry Division; 30th Waffen Grenadier Division of the SS; XIV SS Corps: 553rd Volksgrenadier Division; 10th SS Panzer Division

Strength
680,000 (average strength)	230,000

Casualties and losses
United States: 11,609 killed and wounded, captured or missing France: 7,000 killed and wounded	23,000 killed, wounded, or captured

Operation Northwind (German: Unternehmen Nordwind) was the last major German offensive of World War II on the Western Front. Northwind was launched to support the German Ardennes offensive campaign in the Battle of the Bulge, which by late December 1944 had decisively turned against the German forces. It began on 31 December 1944 in Rhineland-Palatinate, Alsace and Lorraine in southwestern Germany and northeastern France, and ended on 25 January 1945. The German offensive was an operational failure, with its main objectives not achieved, clearing the way for the Allied invasion of Germany.

== Objectives ==
By 21 December 1944, the German momentum during the Battle of the Bulge had begun to dissipate, and it was evident that the operation was on the brink of failure. The German high command aimed to relieve pressure on German forces in the Ardennes by attacking the 7th US Army further south, which had extended its lines and taken on a defensive posture after the 3rd US Army had left to fight the German breakthrough in the north. In a briefing at his military command complex at Adlerhorst, Adolf Hitler declared to his division commanders on 28 December 1944 (three days before the Operation),

"This attack has a very clear objective, namely the destruction of the enemy forces. There is not a matter of prestige involved here. It is a matter of destroying and exterminating the enemy forces wherever we find them."

The goal was to break through the lines of the U.S. Seventh Army and the French 1st Army in the Upper Vosges Mountains and the Alsatian Plain and destroy them, as well as seize the city of Strasbourg, which Himmler had promised would be captured by 30 January. This would pave the way for Operation Dentist (Unternehmen Zahnarzt), a planned killing thrust into the rear of the U.S. Third Army.

== Offensive ==
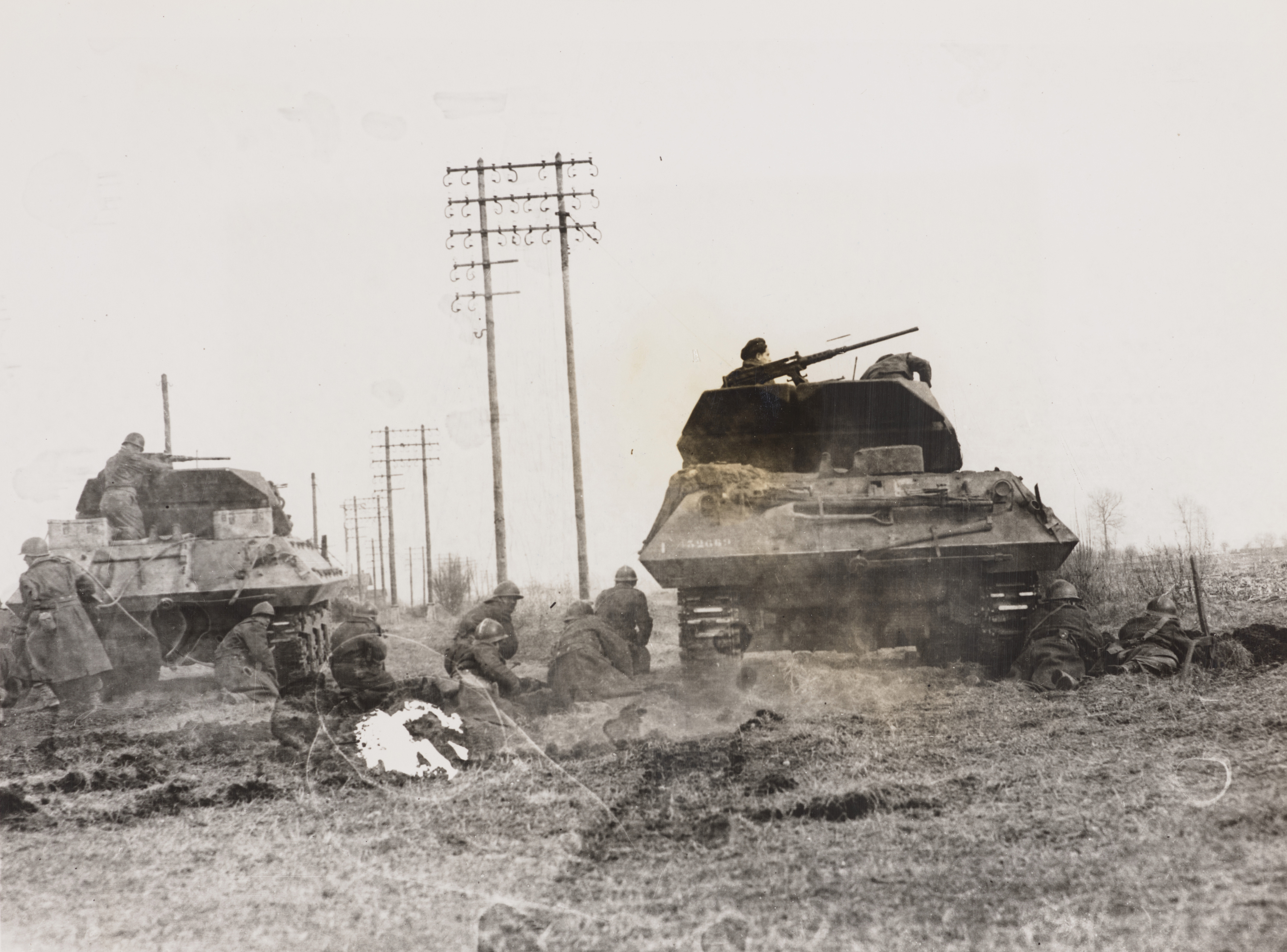
Tanks and soldiers, Operation Nordwind, Alsace–Lorraine, France, 1944–45

On 31 December 1944, German Army Group G (commanded by Generaloberst Johannes Blaskowitz) and Army Group Upper Rhine (commanded by Reichsführer-SS Heinrich Himmler) launched a major offensive against the thinly stretched 110-kilometre-long (68 mi) front line held by the U.S. 7th Army. Operation Nordwind hit effectively against the overextended 7th Army, as U.S. General Eisenhower had recently sent some of its troops, equipment, and supplies north to reinforce the Ardennes in the Battle of the Bulge.

Simultaneously, Operation Bodenplatte sent almost 1,000 Luftwaffe aircraft in supporting attacks against the Allied air forces in the region, but failed to meet any of its objectives.

The initial Nordwind attack was conducted by three corps of the German 1st Army of Army Group G, and by 9 January, the 39th Panzer Corps was heavily engaged as well. By 15 January at least 17 German divisions from Army Group G and Army Group Oberrhein were fighting, including units in the Colmar Pocket in Operation Solstice, and the 6th SS Mountain, 17th SS Panzergrenadier, 21st Panzer, and 25th Panzergrenadier Divisions. Another smaller attack was made against the French positions south of Strasbourg, but it was finally stopped. The U.S. VI Corps—which bore the brunt of the German attacks—was fighting on three sides by 15 January.

The 125th Regiment of the 21st Panzer Division under Colonel Hans von Luck aimed to sever the American supply line to Strasbourg by cutting across the eastern foothills of the Vosges at the northwest base of a natural salient in a bend of the River Rhine. Here the Maginot Line, running east–west, was used by Allied forces, and "showed what a superb fortification it was". On January 7 Luck approached the line south of Wissembourg at the villages of Rittershoffen and Hatten. Heavy American fire came from the 79th Infantry Division, the 14th Armored Division, plus elements of the 42nd Infantry Division. On January 10 Luck reached the villages. Two weeks of heavy fighting followed, Germans and Americans each occupying parts of the villages while civilians sheltered in cellars. Luck later said that the fighting around Rittershoffen had been "one of the hardest and most costly battles that ever raged".

Eisenhower, fearing the outright destruction of the U.S. 7th Army, had rushed already battered divisions from the Ardennes southeast over 100 km (62 mi), to reinforce the 7th Army. But their arrival was delayed, and on 21 January with supplies and ammunition short, Seventh Army ordered the much-depleted 79th Infantry and 14th Armored Divisions to retreat from Rittershoffen and fall back to the south bank of the Moder River.

On 25 January the German offensive was halted near Haguenau by the U.S. 222nd Infantry Regiment, earning the Presidential Unit Citation. The same day reinforcements began to arrive from the Ardennes. Although the Allies had successfully defended Strasbourg, the Colmar Pocket was still in German hands.

== See also ==
- Operation Spring Awakening (The last German offensive on the Eastern Front )
