= Josef Hartinger =

Bavarian State Prosecutor noted for challenging early Nazi atrocities

Josef Michael Hartinger
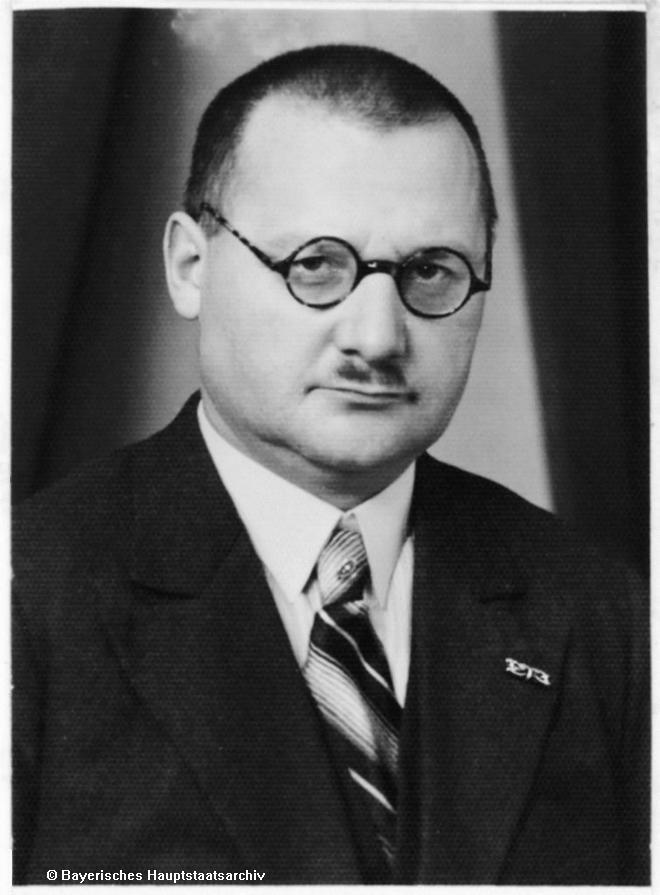
- Born: September 14, 1893; Pertolzhofen, Bavaria, Germany
- Died: 1984 (aged 90–91); Pertolzhofen, near Amberg, West Germany
- Education: Ludwig-Maximilians-Universität München
- Occupation: Lawyer
- Years active: 1928–1966
- Known for: 1933 legal challenge to SS practice of summary execution and fake suicide at Dachau.
- Political party: Christian Social Union (CSU)
- Spouse: Helene Engelhardt (m. 1925)
- Children: 1
- Awards: Bavarian Service Medal (1961), Federal German Service Medal (1967)

Josef Michael Hartinger (14 September 1893 – 30 July 1984) was a German lawyer who worked for the Bavarian State authorities in the latter years of the Weimar Republic when the Nazis came to power. Tasked with investigating some unnatural deaths at the Dachau concentration camp near Munich, Hartinger together with his medical examiner colleague, Moritz Flamm, discovered the SS policy of summary executions and faked suicides at the camp. At great risk to his own safety, Hartinger issued an indictment of the camp authorities, which was ultimately betrayed and suppressed.

== Early life ==
Josef Michael Hartinger was born on 14 September 1893 in the village of Pertolzhofen, Bavaria. He studied law at the Ludwig-Maximilians-Universität München and was employed as state solicitor of the Bavarian Ministry of Justice, servicing initially the Munich I (central) district and later Munich II (the outer limits).

== War service 1914–18 ==
Having come from a family with a strong military tradition, Hartinger dropped out of college in August 1914 to enlist in the 10th Bavarian Field Artillery Regiment under the III Royal Bavarian Corps. After two years of training, he was sent to the Western Front as a petty officer, where he saw action on the Vosges plateau, at Verdun and Flanders in 1917, where he was awarded the Iron Cross.

In September 1917 he was transferred to the 6th Bavarian Field Artillery and in February 1918 was promoted to third sergeant. After some successes in the German Spring offensive of 1918, the Bavarian 6th Field Artillery crossed the Somme and were charged with weakening the British defenses around Villers-Bretonneux. The regiment was decimated, however, under a four-hour barrage from the British guns. Hartinger was awarded the Military Merit Cross (Bavaria) and subsequently promoted to Lieutenant, committing to three more years of military service. After the armistice in November 1918, the Royal Bavarian Corps were disbanded and absorbed into the Reichswehr.

== Inter-war legal studies and career 1918–31 ==
After the armistice in November 1918, Hartinger returned home to find Bavaria in a state of political chaos. As with many war veterans from a middle-class background, he joined with the Freikorps in opposition to the Munich Soviet Republic but in early 1919, he left the militia, resigned his commission at the Reichswehr (forgoing a guaranteed monthly payment) and re-enrolled as student in the law department of LMU Munich.

Despite living in poverty for most of his time in University, Hartinger excelled in his studies and qualified in June 1924. His first employment was in Amberg prison where he provided legal advice on criminal proceedings and prison matters. After serving as assistant to the deputy prosecutor in Passau, he was appointed to the civil court in the jurisdiction of Munich I, where over six years, he established a reputation as an opponent of the rising right-wing radicalism.

In 1925 Hartinger married Helene Engelhardt (17 Oct 1898 – 12 May 1981). They went on to have a daughter in 1927 but his wife suffered from ill-health throughout the 1930s.

In March 1931, Hartinger was promoted from assistant prosecutor in Munich I to deputy prosecutor in Munich II.

== Dachau murder investigations ==
Following the Reichstag Fire Decree for the Protection of People and State, the Nazis began interning political rivals (KPD and SDP members) in concentration camps. One of the first to open was at Dachau, where detainees were guarded by 70 members of the Bavarian Police force. As chief of police in Bavaria, Heinrich Himmler arranged for the police to be gradually relieved of this duty by the newly-formed private army of the Nazi party, the Schutzstaffel (SS). On March 12, the day after the SS arrived, the State solicitor's office received a report of four deaths among the prison population. As any death in State custody (other than from natural causes) had to be investigated, Josef Hartinger and medical examiner Moritz Flamm were dispatched to Dachau concentration camp.

Camp commandant Hilmar Wäckerle showed them to a spot where the four prisoners were shot while trying to escape into the woods and later to a shed where three of their bodies were piled on the floor. Hartinger berated the guards on the undignified treatment of the bodies before he and Dr. Flamm set about identifying and examining them. They quickly noted that all the dead prisoners (Rudolf Benario, Ernst Goldmann, Arthur Kahn) were Jewish and had been shot at the base of the skull. Erwin Kahn (unrelated to Arthur Kahn) survived the escape shooting but four days later died while under SS guard in hospital. Without challenging the guards on these points, the investigators returned over several days to carefully document the evidence, with Flamm performing autopsies on the four prisoners. Hartinger and Flamm noted many inconsistencies between the injuries on the corpses and the camp guards' accounts of the deaths.

With each visit, they had more and more deaths to investigate, such as the case of Sebastian Nefzger, a camp guard, who had allegedly committed suicide. The autopsy showed his back severely bruised all over and evidence of internal bleeding. He had allegedly tried to hang himself with the straps of his own prosthetic leg and when that failed, he had inflicted cuts on his own wrists so deep that they penetrated the bone. The autopsy of the lawyer Alfred Strauss, who was also shot trying to escape, revealed that he died of a bullet in the neck after suffering serious physical attacks. His back was covered with lacerations and his buttocks bandaged to hide a deep cut.

Over a number of months, they uncovered clear evidence of murder and compiled a dossier of charges against Hilmar Wäckerle, the SS commandant of Dachau, Dr. Werner Nürnbergk the camp doctor and Josef Mutzbauer, the camp's chief administrator (Kanzleiobersekretär). In May 1933, Hartinger presented the case to his superior, Bavarian State Prosecutor, Karl Wintersberger. Initially supportive of the investigation, Wintersberger became reluctant to submit the resulting indictment to the Justice Ministry, which was increasingly under the influence of the SS. Wintersberger chose to be open about the investigation with Dachau camp staff and with politicians. Wintersberger refused to sign the indictment and suggested Hartinger submit it himself.
In June 1933, Hartinger reduced the scope of the dossier to the four clearest cases. Johann Kantschuster was accused of murdering Alfred Strauss.

Karl Ehmann was accused of murdering Leonhard Hausmann. The murderer(s) of Louis Schloss and Sebastian Nefzer could not be identified so charges were brought against Wäckerle, Nürnbergk and Mutzbauer for abetting the murder and obstructing investigation.

Wintersberger signed it, after first notifying SS Reichsführer Heinrich Himmler as a courtesy. The killings at Dachau suddenly stopped (temporarily), Wäckerle was transferred to Stuttgart and replaced by Theodor Eicke. The indictment and related evidence reached the office of the Bavarian Justice Minister, Hans Frank, but was intercepted by Gauleiter Adolf Wagner and locked away in a desk only to be discovered by the US Army after the war.

Both Hartinger and Wintersberger were transferred to provincial positions. In 1934 Wintersberger became President of the Higher Regional Court in the city of Bamberg. Hartinger was first moved back to Munich I and then to a position in Amberg. Despite the close scrutiny of local NS party officials (and his wife's fears that their house might be searched), he kept a box of notes from the Dachau investigation. Flamm was no longer employed as a medical examiner and he survived two attempts on his life before his suspicious death in a mental hospital the same year.

== Postwar and later life ==
In 1946 files of the missing indictment were discovered by the US Army in the Bavarian Justice Ministry and were used in evidence in the trials of senior Nazis at the Nürnberg tribunal of 1947. Flamm's thoroughly gathered and documented evidence within Hartinger's indictment ensured it achieved convictions of senior Nazis such as Oswald Pohl. Wintersberger's complicit behaviour is documented in his own evidence to the Pohl Trial.

Although the three accused parties named in Hartinger's original indictment were already dead, the indictment also mentioned "persons unknown" who might have acted on their behalf and one of their most brutal underlings, Hans Steinbrenner was still alive. On the basis of Hartinger's original indictment, Steinbrenner was charged with the murder of Louis Schloss and (with new evidence from several former Dachau prisoners) the murders of Wilhelm Aron and Karl Lehrburger. At Steinbrenner's trial in 1952, the jury reached the following verdicts: Murder of Schloss: not guilty, Grievous Assault of Schloss: guilty (sentence 2 years), Murder of Lehrburger guilty but under duress from his commanding officer (sentence 10 years), Murder of Aron: Guilty (sentence life imprisonment). From his cell in Landsberg prison in 1962 Steinbrenner typed an 8-page confessional letter, which he sent via the prison authorities to Hartinger. He told Hartinger that he himself would have been killed in 1933 had he not been known by so many powerful dignitaries. In May 1963 Steinbrenner was transferred from the prison at Landsberg am Lech to a nursing home in Berchtesgaden, where he later hanged himself.

The Allies' initial plans for the Denazification of Germany in 1945 were diluted when faced with the practicalities of creating a functioning German state. Unlike Wintersberger, Hartinger had not joined the Nazi party before the war but by 1945 over 90% of lawyers and all judges were party members. The practicality of running the judicial system won out over the principle of Denazification, especially when it was entrusted to new German state. So in the post-war German legal system and in the Bavarian State Cabinet, Hartinger still had to deal with many personalities who had been enthusiastic Nazis and others who had conformed with the regime.

The infamous Braunbuch published by the GDR claimed to list all functionaries of the Federal Republic of Germany who were former Nazis and war criminals. The 1968 edition lists Josef Hartinger as a former Kriegsgerichtsrat (Judge-advocate with equivalent rank as Major) of the "Höheres Kommando LX" (a communications division of the Wehrmacht). Whether such a position would have afforded him scope for war crimes is arguable but it contradicts the record in the Bavarian State Archive that shows him working as director of the district court ("Landgerichtsdirektor") in the town of Amberg from 1936 until the end of the war.

As with all German lawyers, Hartinger came before a Denazification hearing (Spruchkammerverfahren) in 1948 and was restored to his position in Amberg.

In 1954 Hartinger was appointed as "Bundesanwalt beim Bundesgerichtshof" at the newly founded Federal Court of Justice in Karlsruhe, presided over by Hermann Weinkauff, who from 1932 to 1937 was Director of the Landgericht in Munich I (while Hartinger was in Munich II), a member of the Association of National Socialist German Lawyers (BNSDJ) and eventually transferred from prosecution to jurisprudence presiding over cases involving "racial defilement" at the III. Criminal Senate.

In 1953 Weinkauff openly challenged a decision by the Federal Constitutional Court rejecting an appeal by 34 former Gestapo officials for the right to reinstatement as civil servants.

From 9 December 1958 until his retirement on 5 December 1966, Hartinger served as Chief Secretary at the Bavarian Ministry of Justice in the Cabinets of Dr. Hanns Seidel, Dr. Hans Ehard and Dr. Alfons Goppel. He served under Justice Ministers of the FDP as well as CSU and although he is widely referred to as a "politician", unlike most Cabinet members he is listed without party allegiance.

In 1984, at the request of the Bavarian Minister of Justice, August Lang, Hartinger wrote his recollections of the Dachau investigations and failed indictment of 1933/34 in two extensive letters to the minister dated January 16 and February 11. He died 6 months later shortly before his 91st birthday.

== Portrayal in the media ==
He was featured in "The First Six Months in Power", the second episode of the 2019 BBC documentary Rise of the Nazis. He was played by Kristupas Kavaliauskas. The episode describes the investigation into the murders at Dachau when he was deputy state prosecutor.

== Film and media ==
- Ryback, Timothy W. (April 21, 2015). Hitler's First Victims: The Quest for Justice. FacingHistory.org.
- Jones, Julian (September 2, 2019). The Rise of the Nazis: Episode 2 The first 6 months in power. BBC.
