= Hans Steinbrenner =

Hans Steinbrenner may refer to:

- Hans Steinbrenner (SS member) (1905–1964), German concentration camp overseer
- Hans Steinbrenner (sculptor) (1928–2008), German painter and sculptor
