= Dachau concentration camp =

Nazi concentration camp in Germany (1933–1945)

Coordinates: 48°16′08″N 11°28′07″E

Dachau
- Nazi concentration camp
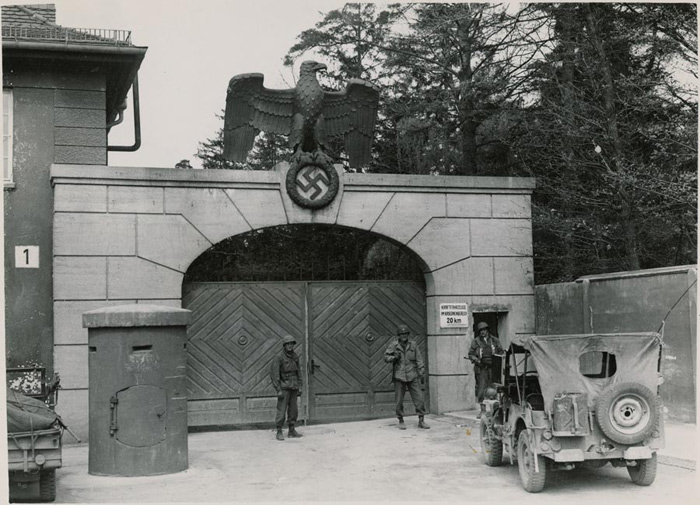
- U.S. soldiers guarding the main entrance to Dachau just after liberation, 1945

- Location of Dachau within Nazi Germany in 1937
- Other names: German: Konzentrationslager (KZ) Dachau, IPA: [ˈdaxaʊ]
- Location: Upper Bavaria, Southern Germany
- Built by: Nazi Germany
- Operated by: Schutzstaffel (SS)
- Commandant: List of commandants
- Original use: Political prison
- Operational: March 1933 – April 1945
- Inmates: Political prisoners, Poles, Romani, Jews, homosexuals, Jehovah's Witnesses, Catholic priests, Communists
- Number of inmates: Over 188,000 (estimated)
- Killed: 41,500 (per Dachau website)
- Liberated by: U.S. Army
- Website: kz-gedenkstaette-dachau.de

Dachau (UK: /ˈdæxaʊ/, /-kaʊ/; US: /ˈdɑːxaʊ/, /-kaʊ/; German: [ˈdaxaʊ]) was one of the first (Note: Nohra concentration camp, which opened 19 days earlier, was the first, but it was not purpose-built and only existed for a few months.) concentration camps built by Nazi Germany and the longest-running one, opening on 22 March 1933. The camp was initially intended to intern the Nazi Party's political opponents, which consisted of communists, social democrats, and other dissidents. It was located on the grounds of an abandoned munitions factory northeast of the medieval town of Dachau, about 16 km (10 mi) northwest of Munich in the Gau Munich-Upper Bavaria, in Southern Germany. After its opening by Heinrich Himmler, its purpose was enlarged to include forced labor, and eventually, the imprisonment of Jews, Romani, Germans, and Austrians that the Nazi Party regarded as criminals, and, finally, foreign nationals from countries that Germany occupied or invaded. The Dachau camp system grew to include nearly one hundred sub-camps, which were mostly work camps or arbeitskommandos, and were located throughout southern Germany and Austria. The main camp was liberated by U.S. forces on 29 April 1945. Dachau was the third concentration camp to be liberated by British or American Allied forces.

Prisoners lived in constant fear of brutal treatment and torture including standing cells, floggings, tree or pole hanging, and being forced to stand at attention for extremely long periods. At least 25,613 prisoners are believed to have been murdered in the camp and almost another 10,000 died in its subcamps, primarily from disease, malnutrition and suicide. The Dachau Memorial Site archive has documented 32,000 deaths at the camp, but thousands more are undocumented. Crematoria were constructed to dispose of the deceased. Approximately 10,000 of the 30,000 prisoners were sick at the time of liberation.

In the postwar years, the Dachau facility served to hold SS soldiers awaiting trial. After 1948, it held ethnic Germans who had been expelled from eastern Europe and were awaiting resettlement, and also was used for a time as a United States military base during the occupation. It was finally closed in 1960.

There are several religious memorials within the memorial site, which is open to the public.

== History ==
=== Establishment ===
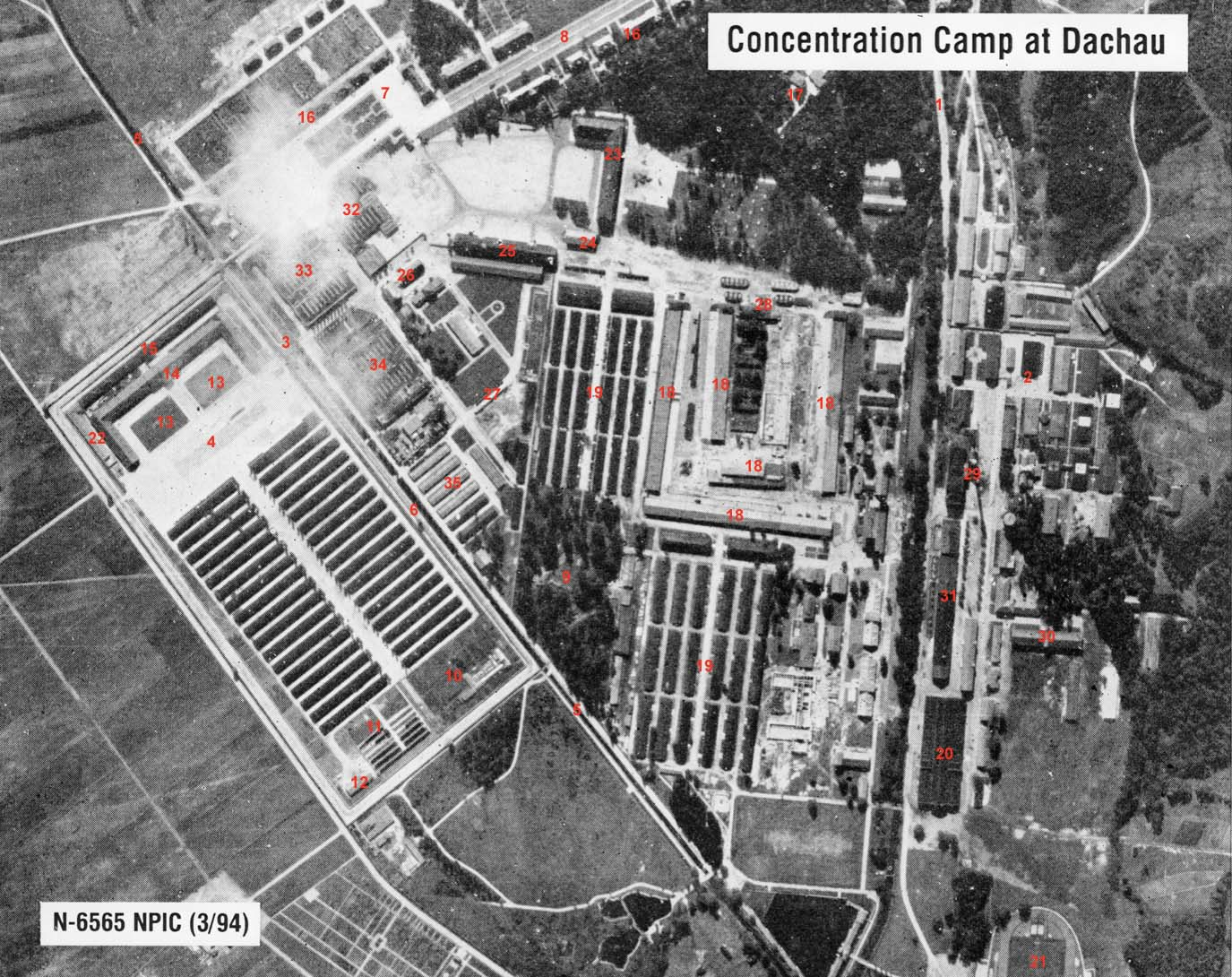
Aerial photo of the Dachau complex with the actual concentration camp on the left

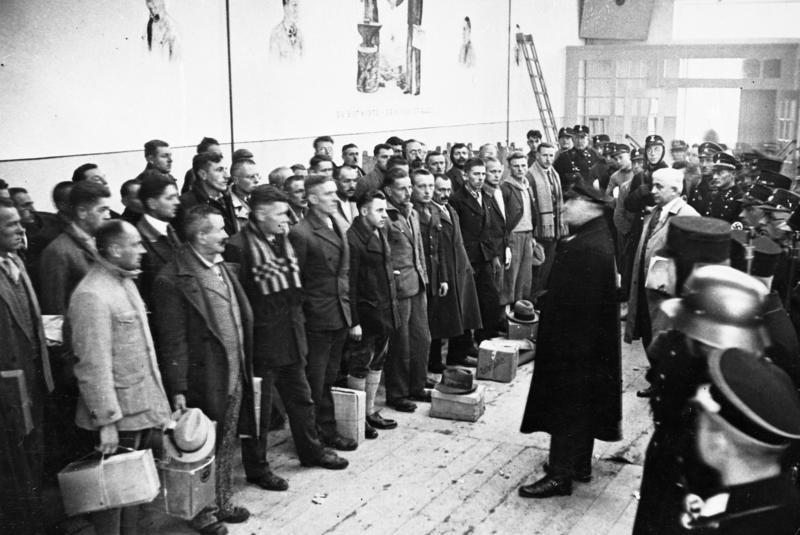
The camp commander gives a speech to prisoners about to be released as part of a pardoning action near Christmas 1933.

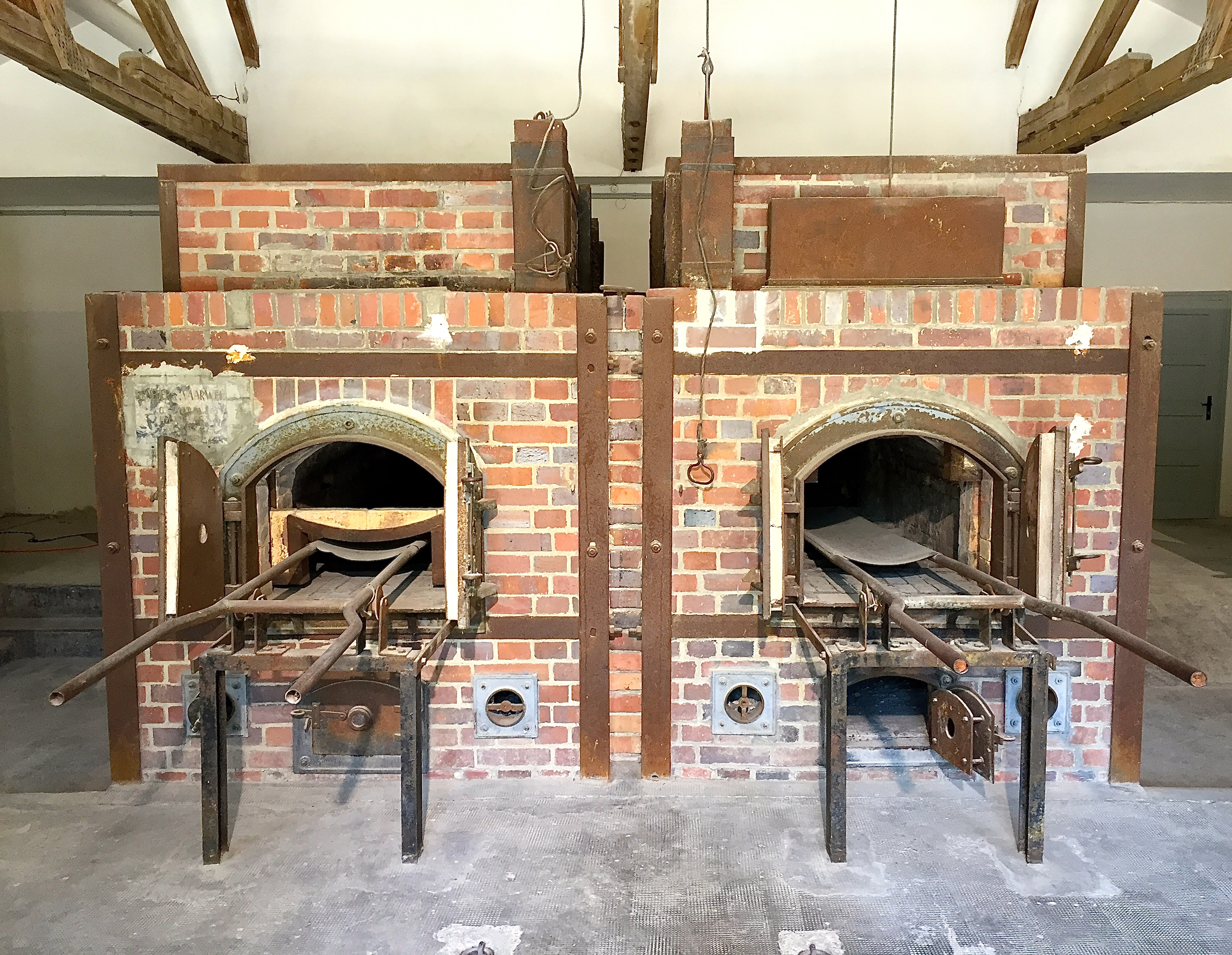
Two Dachau crematoria

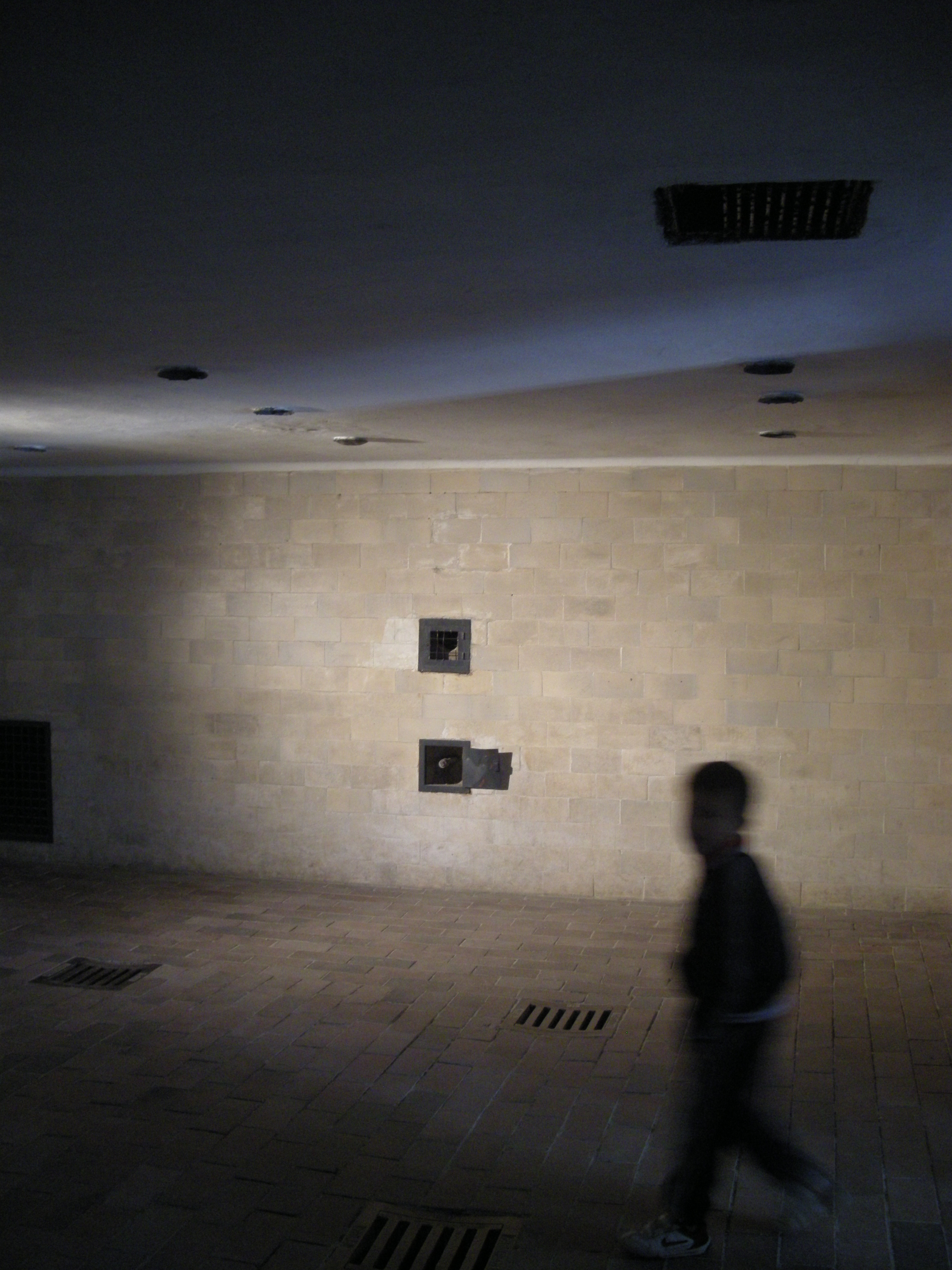
The unused gas chamber in 2011

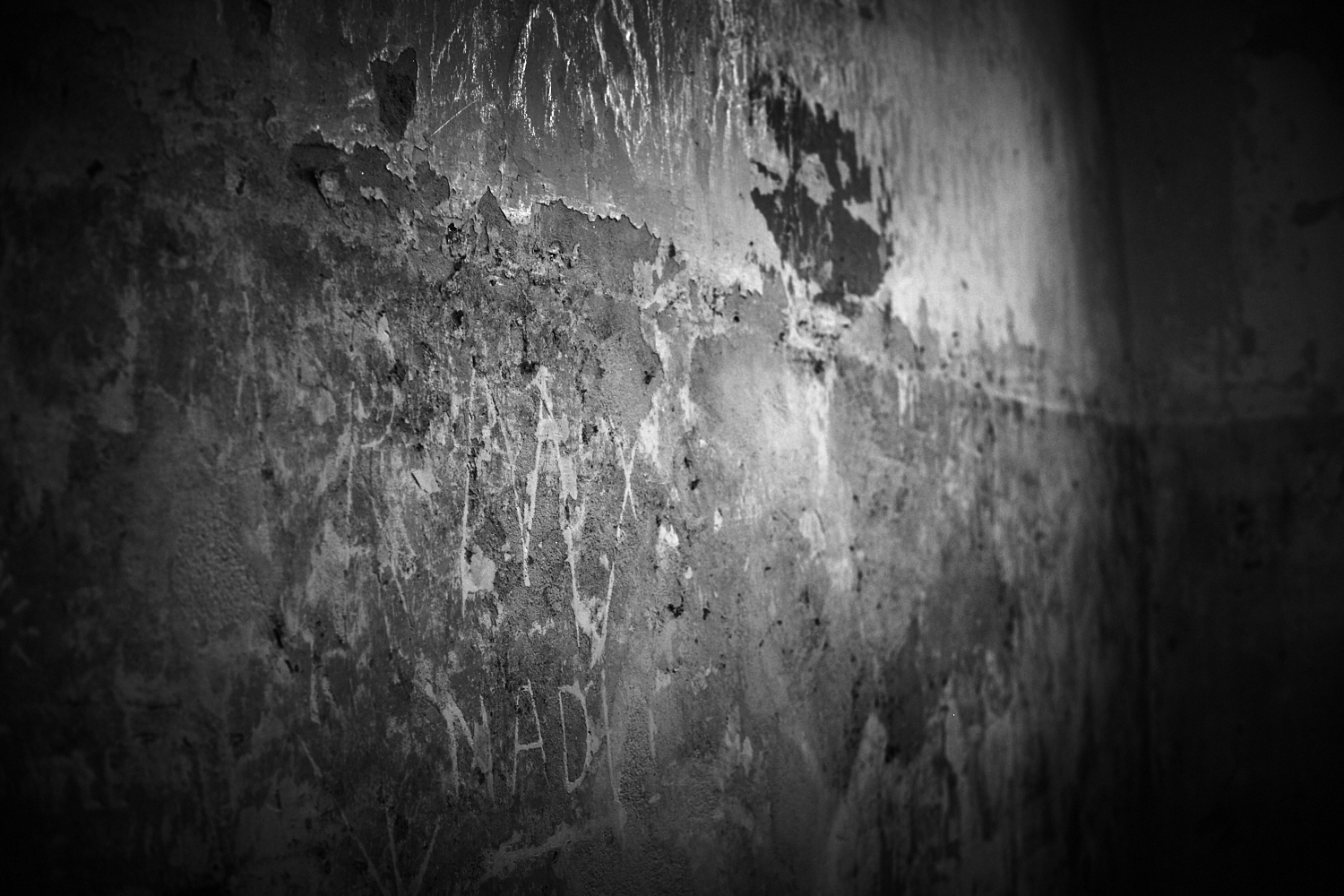
Wall of a prison cell

After the takeover of Bavaria on 9 March 1933, Heinrich Himmler, then Chief of Police in Munich, began to speak with the administration of an unused gunpowder and munitions factory. He toured the site to see if it could be used for quartering protective-custody prisoners. Dachau's close proximity to Munich, where Hitler came to power and where the Nazi Party had its official headquarters, made Dachau a convenient location. The concentration camp at Dachau was opened 22 March 1933, with the arrival of about 200 prisoners from Stadelheim Prison in Munich and the Landsberg fortress (where Hitler had written Mein Kampf during his imprisonment). Himmler announced in the Münchner Neueste Nachrichten newspaper that the camp could hold up to 5,000 people, and described it as "the first concentration camp for political prisoners" to be used to restore calm to Germany. It became the first regular concentration camp established by the coalition government of the National Socialist German Worker's Party (Nazi Party) and the German National People's Party (dissolved on 6 July 1933). Dachau was the concentration camp that was in operation the longest, from March 1933 to April 1945, nearly all twelve years of the Nazi regime.

The camp's layout and building plans were developed by Commandant Theodor Eicke and were applied to all later camps. He had a separate, secure camp near the command center, which consisted of living quarters, administration and army camps. Eicke became the chief inspector for all concentration camps, responsible for organizing others according to his model.

The Dachau complex included the prisoners' camp which occupied approximately 5 acres, and the much larger area of SS training school including barracks, factories plus other facilities of around 20 acres.

Jehovah's Witnesses, homosexuals and emigrants were sent to Dachau after the 1935 passage of the Nuremberg Laws which institutionalized racial discrimination. In early 1937, the SS, using prisoner labor, initiated construction of a large complex capable of holding 6,000 prisoners. The construction was officially completed in mid-August 1938. More political opponents, and over 11,000 German and Austrian Jews were sent to the camp after the annexation of Austria and the Sudetenland in 1938. Sinti and Roma in the hundreds were sent to the camp in 1939, and over 13,000 prisoners were sent to the camp from Poland in 1940. As the German military occupied other European states, citizens from across Europe were sent to concentration camps. Subsequently, the camp was used for prisoners of all sorts, from every nation occupied by the forces of the Third Reich. Representatives of the International Committee of the Red Cross inspected the camp in 1935 and 1938 and documented the harsh conditions.

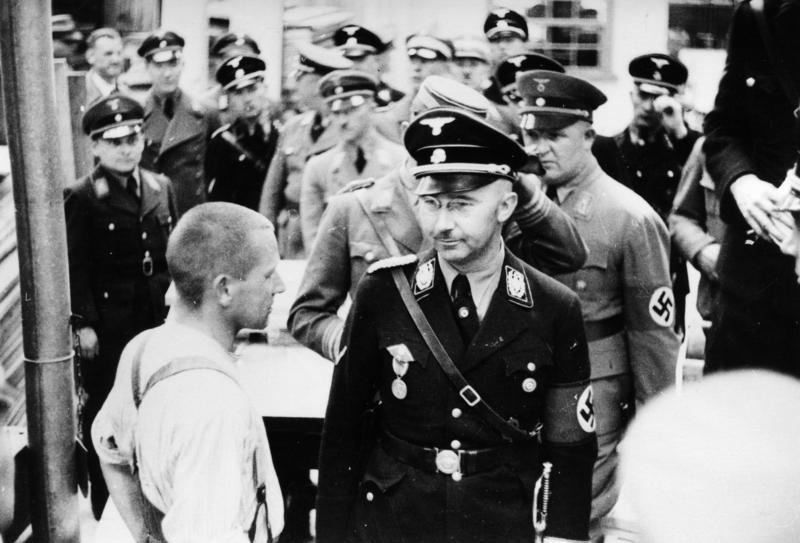
Heinrich Himmler (front right, beside prisoner) inspecting Dachau Concentration Camp on 8 May 1936

=== First deaths in 1933: investigation ===
Shortly after the SS was commissioned to supplement the Bavarian police overseeing the Dachau camp, the first reports of prisoner deaths at Dachau began to emerge. In April 1933, Josef Hartinger, an official from the Bavarian Justice Ministry and physician Moritz Flamm, part-time medical examiner, arrived at the camp to investigate the deaths in accordance with the Bavarian penal code. They noted many inconsistencies between the injuries on the corpses and the camp guards' accounts of the deaths. Over a number of months, Hartinger and Flamm uncovered clear evidence of murder and compiled a dossier of charges against Hilmar Wäckerle, the SS commandant of Dachau, Werner Nürnbergk, the camp doctor, and Josef Mutzbauer, the camp's chief administrator (Kanzleiobersekretär). In June 1933, Hartinger presented the case to his superior, Bavarian State Prosecutor Karl Wintersberger. Initially supportive of the investigation, Wintersberger became reluctant to submit the resulting indictment to the Justice Ministry, increasingly under the influence of the SS. Hartinger reduced the scope of the dossier to the four clearest cases and Wintersberger signed it, after first notifying Himmler as a courtesy. The killings at Dachau suddenly stopped (temporarily); Wäckerle was transferred to Stuttgart and replaced by Theodor Eicke. The indictment and related evidence reached the office of Hans Frank, the Bavarian Justice Minister, but was intercepted by Gauleiter Adolf Wagner and locked away in a desk only to be discovered by the US Army. In 1934, both Hartinger and Wintersberger were transferred to provincial positions. Flamm was no longer employed as a medical examiner and was to survive two attempts on his life before his suspicious death in the same year. Flamm's thoroughly gathered and documented evidence within Hartiger's indictment ensured that it achieved convictions of senior Nazis at the Nuremberg trials in 1947. Wintersberger's complicit behaviour is documented in his own evidence to the Pohl Trial.

=== Forced labor ===
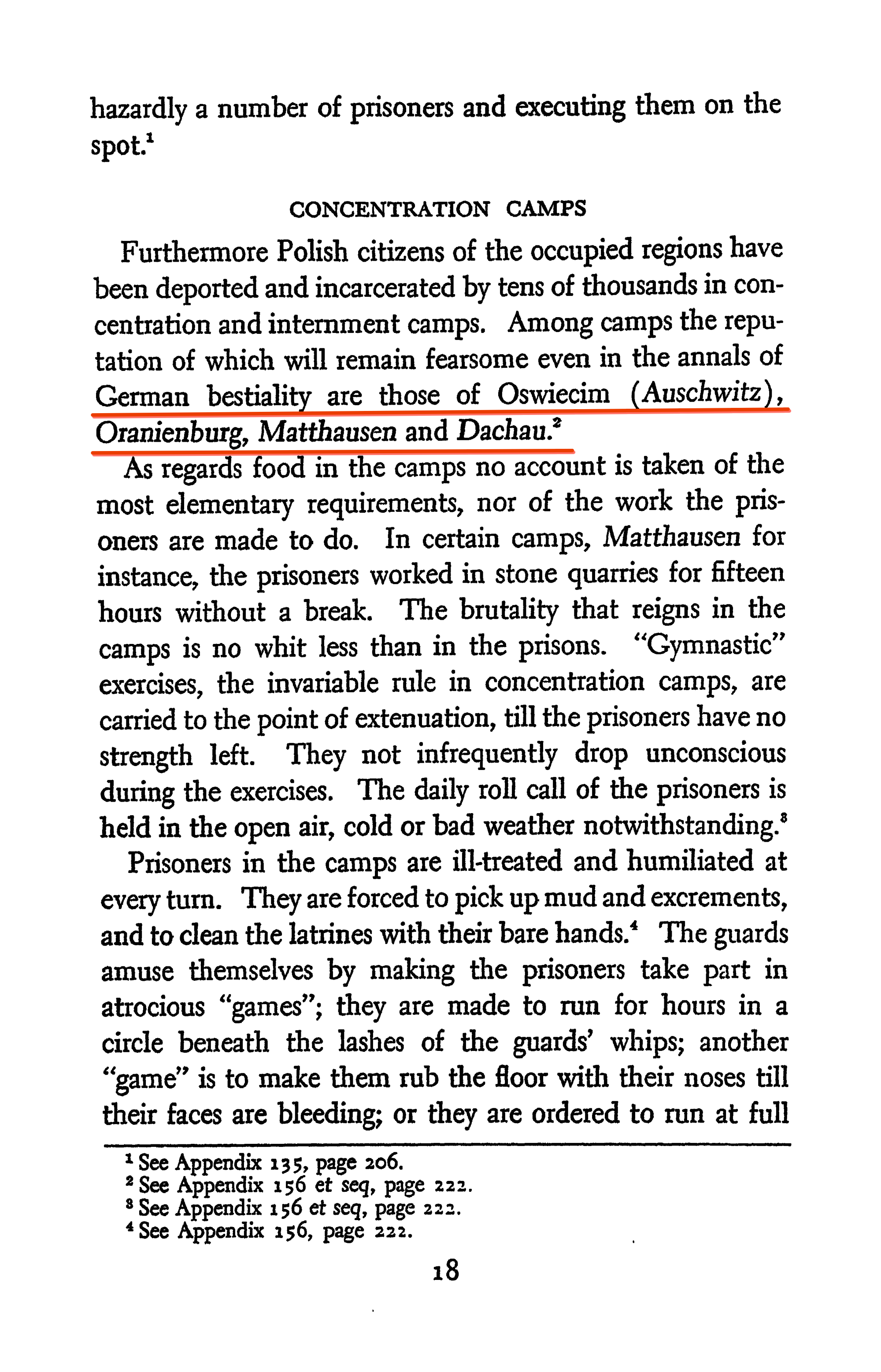
German concentration camps: Auschwitz, Oranienburg, Mauthausen and Dachau in The Polish White Book, New York (1941).

The prisoners of Dachau concentration camp originally were to serve as forced labor for a munition factory, and to expand the camp. It was used as a training center for the SS-Totenkopfverbände guards and was a model for other concentration camps. The camp was about 300 m × 600 m (1,000 ft × 2,000 ft) in rectangular shape. The prisoners' entrance was secured by an iron gate with the motto "Arbeit macht frei" ("Work will make you free"). This reflected Nazi propaganda, which had concentration camps as labor and re-education camps. This was their original purpose, but the focus was soon shifted to using forced labor as a method of torture and murder. The original slogan was left on the gates.

As of 1938, the procedure for new arrivals occurred at the Schubraum, where prisoners were to hand over their clothing and possessions. One former Luxembourgish prisoner, Albert Theis, reflected about the room, "There we were stripped of all our clothes. Everything had to be handed over: money, rings, watches. One was now stark naked".

The camp included an administration building that contained offices for the Gestapo trial commissioner, SS authorities, the camp leader and his deputies. These administration offices consisted of large storage rooms for the personal belongings of prisoners, the bunker, roll-call square where guards would also inflict punishment on prisoners (especially those who tried to escape), the canteen where prisoners served SS men with cigarettes and food, the museum containing plaster images of prisoners who suffered from bodily defects, the camp office, the library, the barracks, and the infirmary, which was staffed by prisoners who had previously held occupations such as physicians or army surgeons.

=== Operation Barbarossa ===
Over 4,000 Soviet prisoners of war were murdered by the Dachau commandant's guard at the SS shooting range located at Hebertshausen, two kilometers from the main camp, in 1941/1943. These murders were a clear violation of the provisions laid down in the Geneva Convention for prisoners of war. The SS used the cynical term Sonderbehandlung ("special treatment") for these criminal executions. The first executions of the Soviet prisoners of war at the Hebertshausen shooting range took place on 25 November 1941.

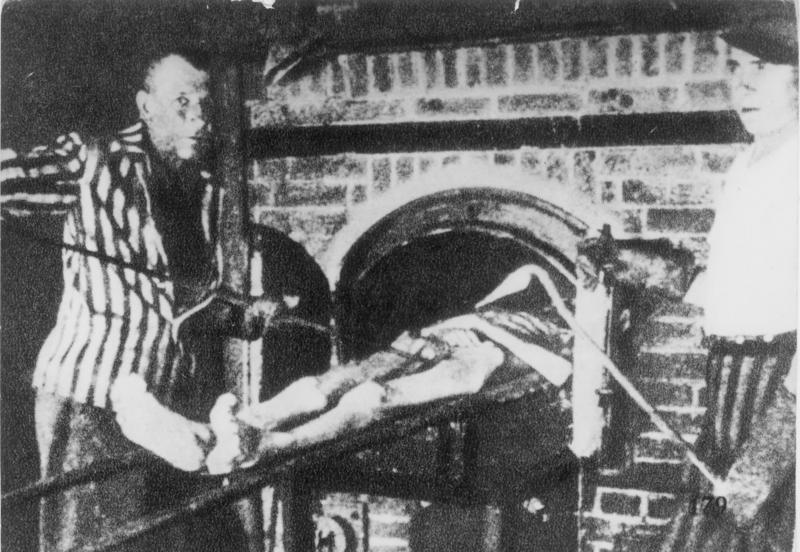
Former prisoners of KZ Dachau reenact the operation of the crematorium by pushing a corpse toward one of the ovens.

After 1942, the number of prisoners being held at the camp continued to exceed 12,000. Dachau originally held communists, leading socialists and other "enemies of the state" in 1933 but, over time, the Nazis began to send German Jews to the camp. In the early years of imprisonment, Jews were offered permission to emigrate overseas if they "voluntarily" gave their property to enhance Hitler's public treasury. Once Austria was annexed and Czechoslovakia was dissolved, the citizens of both countries became the next prisoners at Dachau. In 1940, Dachau became filled with Polish prisoners, who continued to be the majority of the prisoner population until Dachau was officially liberated.

The prisoner enclosure at the camp was heavily guarded to ensure that no prisoners escaped. A 3-meter-wide (9.8-foot) no-man's land was the first marker of confinement for prisoners; an area which, upon entry, would elicit lethal gunfire from guard towers. Guards are known to have tossed inmates' caps into this area, resulting in the death of the prisoners when they attempted to retrieve the caps. Despondent prisoners committed suicide by entering the zone. A four-foot-deep and eight-foot-broad (1.2 × 2.4 m) creek, connected with the river Amper, lay on the west side between the "neutral-zone" and the electrically charged, and barbed wire fence which surrounded the entire prisoner enclosure.

In August 1944 a women's camp opened inside Dachau. In the last months of the war, the conditions at Dachau deteriorated. As Allied forces advanced toward Germany, the Germans began to move prisoners from concentration camps near the front to more centrally located camps. They hoped to prevent the liberation of large numbers of prisoners. Transports from the evacuated camps arrived continuously at Dachau. After days of travel with little or no food or water, the prisoners arrived weak and exhausted, often near death.

In late 1944, a typhus epidemic occurred in the camp caused by poor sanitation and overcrowding, which caused more than 15,000 deaths. It was followed by an evacuation, in which large numbers of the prisoners died. Toward the end of the war, death marches to and from the camp caused the deaths of numerous unrecorded prisoners.

Owing to repeated transports from the front, the camp was constantly overcrowded and the hygiene conditions were beneath human dignity. It is claimed that in 1942, more than 3,166 prisoners in weakened condition were transported to Hartheim Castle near Linz, and were executed by poison gas because they were deemed unfit. Starting from the end of 1944 up to the day of liberation, 15,000 people died, about half of all the prisoners held at KZ Dachau. Five hundred Soviet POWs were executed by firing squad. The first shipment of women came from Auschwitz-Birkenau.

=== Final days ===
As late as 19 April 1945, prisoners were sent to KZ Dachau; on that date a freight train from Buchenwald with nearly 4,500 was diverted to Nammering. SS troops and police confiscated food and water that local townspeople tried to give to the prisoners. Nearly three hundred dead bodies were ordered removed from the train and carried to a ravine over 400 metres (1/4 mi) away. The 524 prisoners who had been forced to carry the dead to this site were then shot by the guards, and buried along with those who had died on the train. Nearly 800 bodies went into this mass grave. The train continued on to KZ Dachau.

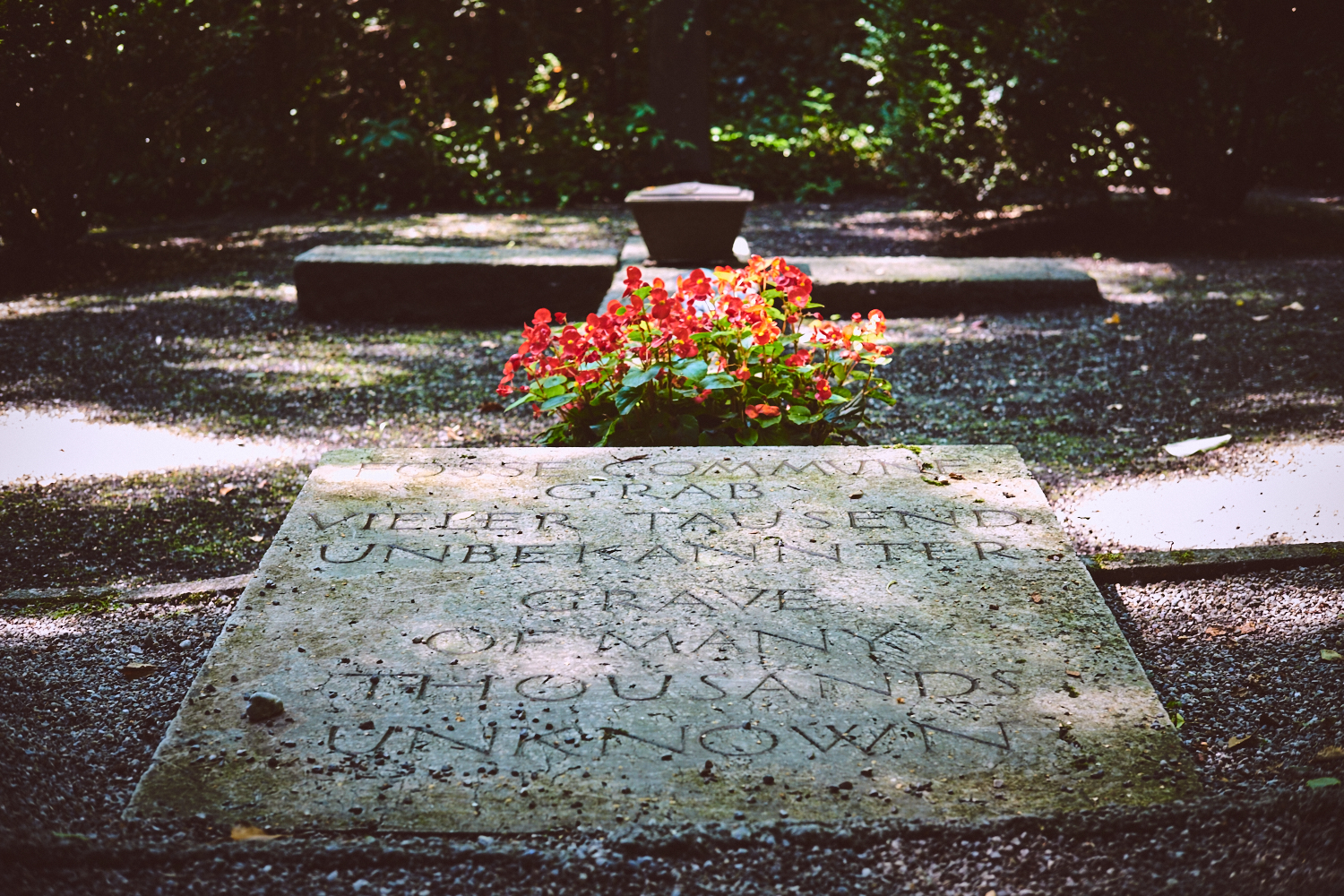
"Grave of many thousand unknown."

During April 1945 as U.S. troops drove deeper into Bavaria, the commander of KZ Dachau suggested to Himmler that the camp be turned over to the Allies. Himmler, in signed correspondence, prohibited such a move, adding that "No prisoners shall be allowed to fall into the hands of the enemy alive."

Between January and April 1945 11,560 detainees died at KZ Dachau according to a U.S. Army report of 1945, though the Dachau administration registered 12,596 deaths from typhus at the camp over the same period. On 24 April 1945, just days before the U.S. troops arrived at the camp, the commandant and a strong guard forced between 6,000 and 7,000 surviving inmates on a death march from Dachau south to Eurasburg, then eastwards towards the Tegernsee; liberated two days after Hitler's death by a Nisei-ethnicity U.S. Army artillery battalion. Any prisoners who could not keep up on the six-day march were shot. Many others died of exhaustion, hunger and exposure. Months later a mass grave containing 1,071 prisoners was found along the route.

Though at the time of liberation the death rate had peaked at 200 per day, after the liberation by U.S. forces the rate eventually fell to between 50 and 80 deaths per day from malnutrition and disease. In addition to the direct abuse of the SS and the harsh conditions, people died from typhus epidemics and starvation. The number of inmates had peaked in 1944 with transports from evacuated camps in the east (such as Auschwitz), and the resulting overcrowding led to an increase in the death rate.

== Main camp ==
=== Purpose ===
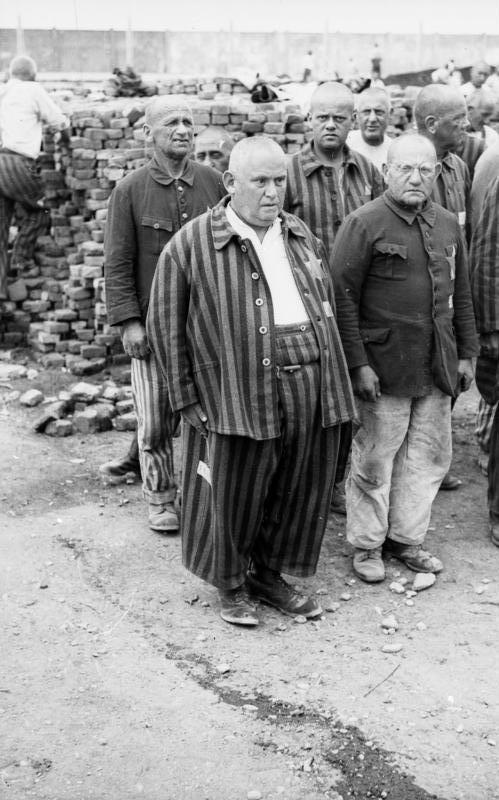
Roll-call of Jewish prisoners (wearing Star of David badges), 20 July 1938

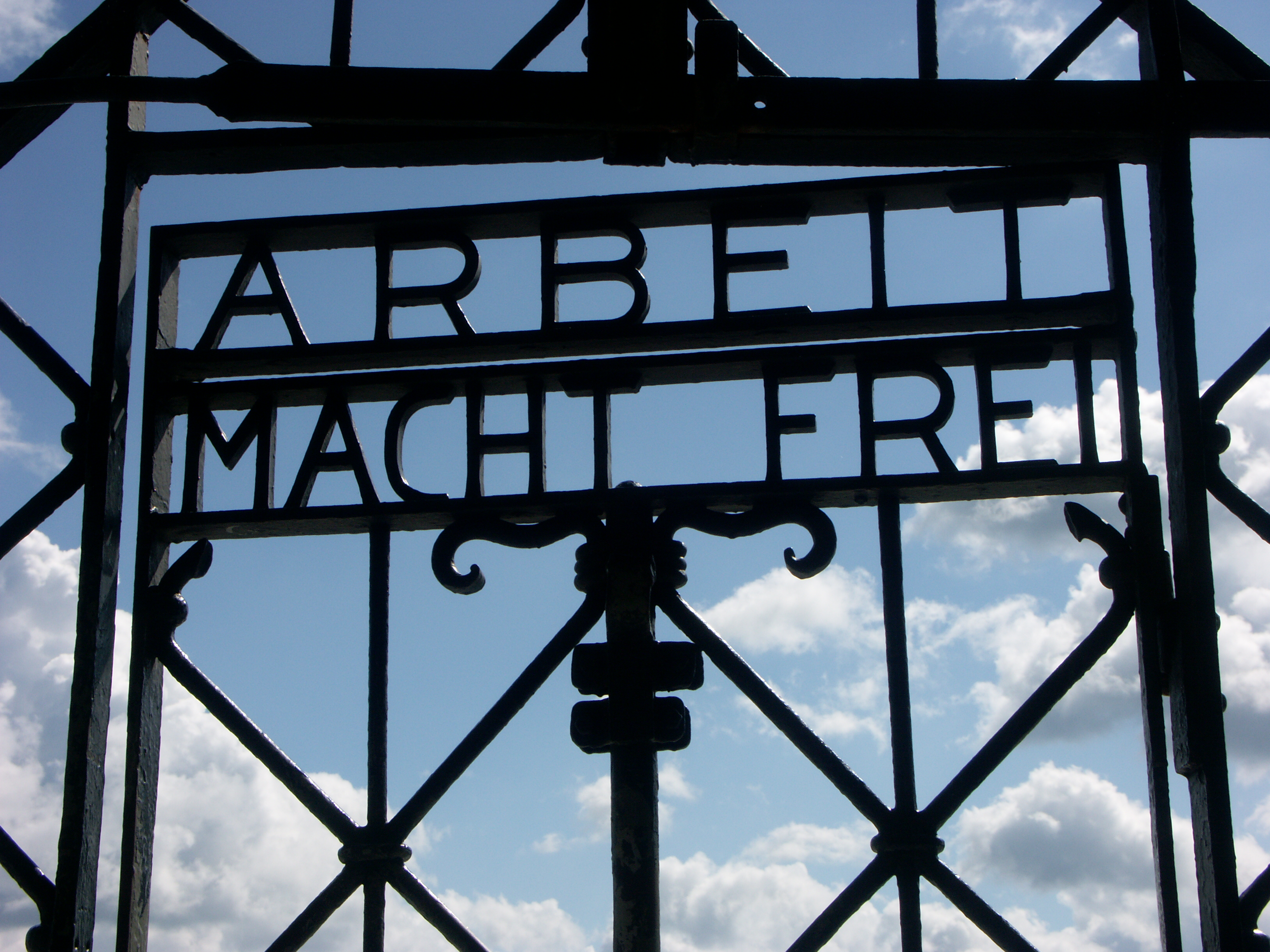
The gate at the Jourhaus building through which the prisoners' camp was entered contains the slogan, Arbeit macht frei, or 'Work Sets You Free.'

Dachau was opened in March 1933. The press statement given at the opening stated:

On Wednesday the first concentration camp is to be opened in Dachau with an accommodation for 5000 people. 'All Communists and—where necessary—Reichsbanner and Social Democratic functionaries who endanger state security are to be concentrated here, as in the long run it is not possible to keep individual functionaries in the state prisons without overburdening these prisons, and on the other hand these people cannot be released because attempts have shown that they persist in their efforts to agitate and organize as soon as they are released.

Whatever the publicly stated purpose of the camp, the SS men who arrived there on 11 May 1933 were left in no illusion as to its real purpose by the speech given on that day by Johann-Erasmus Freiherr von Malsen-Ponickau

Comrades of the SS!
You all know what the Fuehrer has called us to do. We have not come here for human encounters with those pigs in there. We do not consider them human beings, as we are, but as second-class people. For years they have been able to continue their criminal existence. But now we are in power. If those pigs had come to power, they would have cut off all our heads. Therefore we have no room for sentimentalism. If anyone here cannot bear to see the blood of comrades, he does not belong and had better leave. The more of these pig dogs we strike down, the fewer we need to feed.

The entrance gate used by prisoners carries the phrase "Arbeit macht frei" (lit. '"Work makes free"', or "Work makes [one] free"; contextual English translation: "Work shall set you free"). This phrase was also used in several other concentration camps such as Theresienstadt, near Prague, and Auschwitz I.

Dachau served as a prototype and model for the other German concentration camps that followed. Almost every community in Germany had members taken away to these camps. Newspapers continually reported "the removal of the enemies of the Reich to concentration camps." As early as 1935, a jingle went around: "Lieber Herr Gott, mach mich stumm, dass ich nicht nach Dachau komm'" ("Dear Lord God, make me dumb [silent], That I may not to Dachau come").

Between 1933 and 1945, more than 3.5 million Germans were imprisoned in such concentration camps or prison for political reasons. Approximately 77,000 Germans were killed for one or another form of resistance by Special Courts, courts-martial, and the civil justice system. Many of these Germans had served in government, the military, or in civil positions, which were considered to enable them to engage in subversion and conspiracy against the Nazis.

=== Organization ===
The camp was divided into two sections: the camp area and the crematorium. The camp area consisted of 32 barracks, including one for clergy imprisoned for opposing the Nazi regime and one reserved for medical experiments. The courtyard between the prison and the central kitchen was used for the summary execution of prisoners. The camp was surrounded by an electrified barbed-wire fence, a ditch, and a wall with seven guard towers.

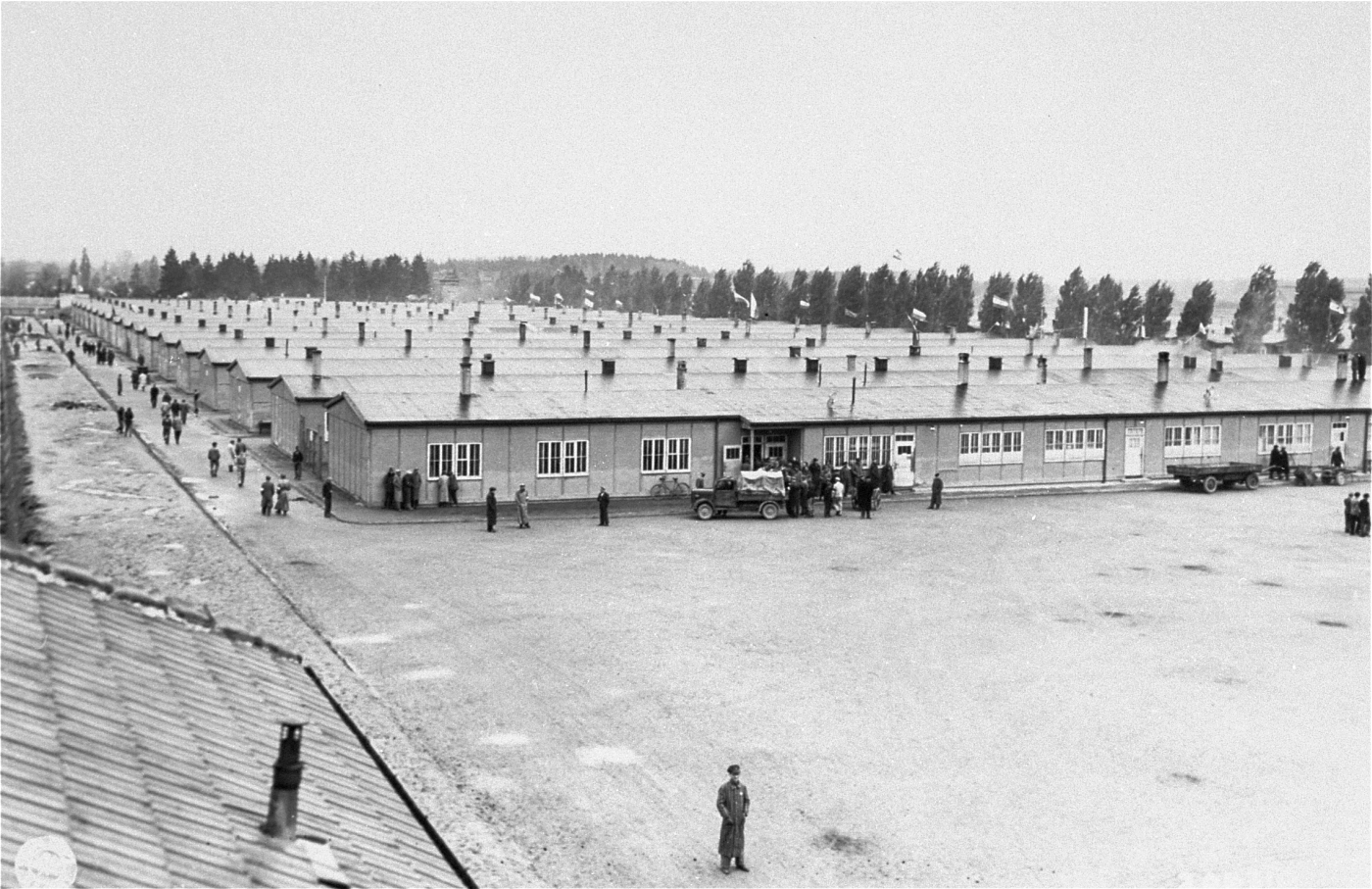
Prisoners' barracks in 1945

In early 1937, the SS, using prisoner labor, initiated construction of a large complex of buildings on the grounds of the original camp. The construction was officially completed in mid-August 1938 and the camp remained essentially unchanged and in operation until 1945. A crematorium that was next to, but not directly accessible from within the camp, was erected in 1942. KZ Dachau was therefore the longest running concentration camp of the Third Reich. The Dachau complex included other SS facilities beside the concentration camp—a leader school of the economic and civil service, the medical school of the SS, etc. The camp at that time was called a "protective custody camp", and occupied less than half of the area of the entire complex.

=== Medical experimentation ===
Hundreds of prisoners suffered and died, or were executed, in medical experiments conducted at KZ Dachau, of which Sigmund Rascher was in charge. Hypothermia experiments involved exposure to vats of icy water or being strapped down naked outdoors in freezing temperatures. Attempts at reviving the subjects included scalding baths, and forcing naked women to have sexual intercourse with the unconscious victim. Nearly 100 prisoners died during these experiments. The original records of the experiments were destroyed "in an attempt to conceal the atrocities". (Note: "In an attempt to conceal the atrocities, the original, incriminating records of most of the concentration camp studies of humans were destroyed before the camps were captured by the Allied forces." (See Medicine, Ethics, and the Third Reich: Historical and Contemporary Issues p. 88))

Extensive communication between the investigators and Heinrich Himmler, head of the SS, documents the experiments.

During 1942, "high altitude" experiments were conducted. Victims were subjected to rapid decompression to pressures found at 4,300 metres (14,100 ft), and experienced spasmodic convulsions, agonal breathing, and eventual death.

=== Demographics ===
The camp was originally designed for holding German and Austrian political prisoners and Jews, but in 1935 it began to be used also for ordinary criminals. Inside the camp there was a sharp division between the two groups of prisoners; those who were there for political reasons and therefore wore a red tag, and the criminals, who wore a green tag. The political prisoners who were there because they disagreed with Nazi Party policies, or with Hitler, naturally did not consider themselves criminals. Dachau was used as the chief camp for Christian (mainly Catholic) clergy who were imprisoned for not conforming with the Nazi Party line.

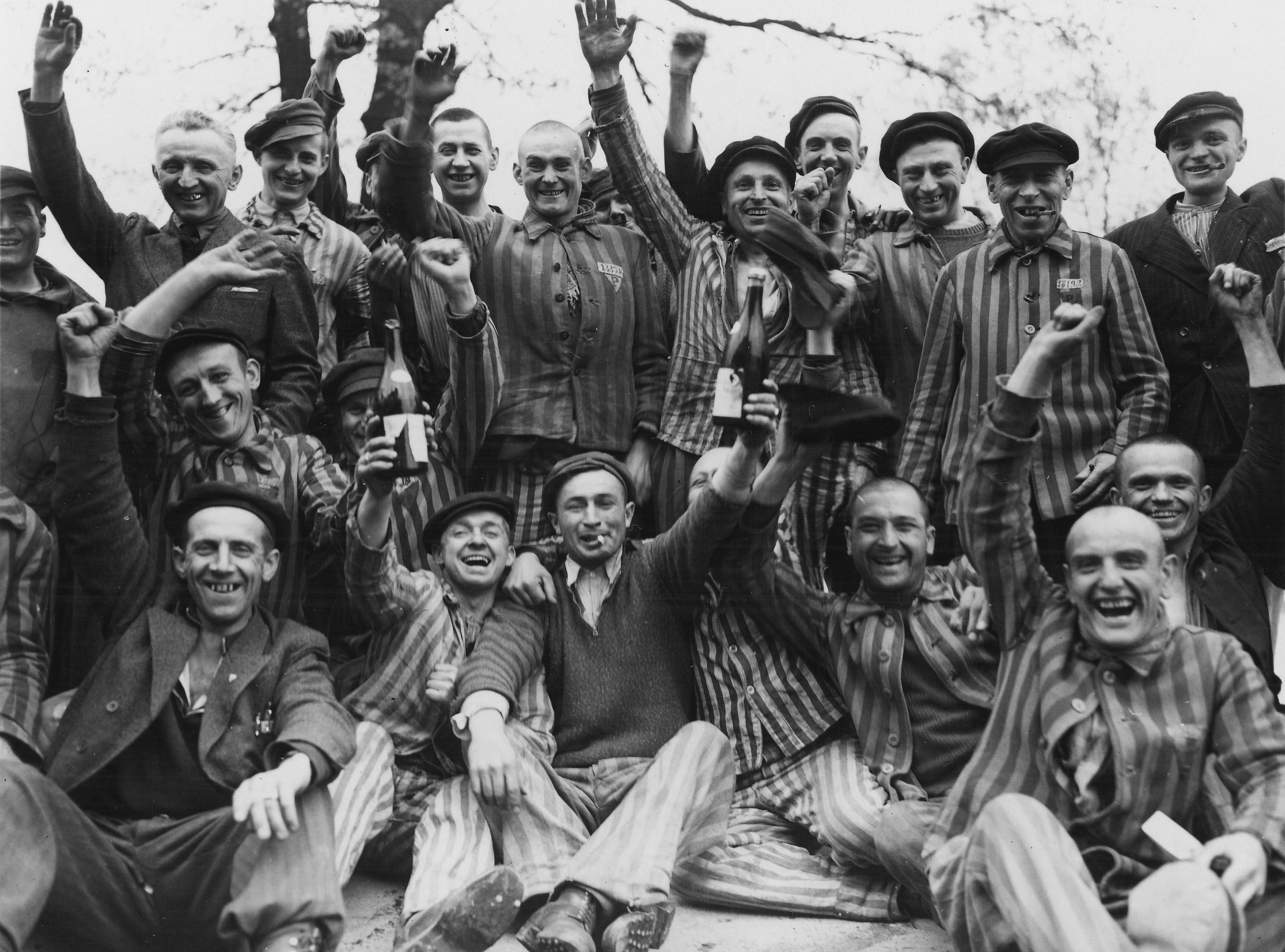
Polish prisoners in Dachau toast their liberation from the camp. Poles constituted the largest ethnic group in the camp during the war, followed by Russians, French, Yugoslavs, Jews, and Czechs.

During the war, other nationals were transferred to it, including French; in 1940 Poles; in 1941 people from the Balkans, Czechs, Yugoslavs; and in 1942, Russians. Demographic statistics vary but they are in the same general range. One source gives a general estimate of over 200,000 prisoners from more than 30 countries during Nazi rule, of whom two-thirds were political prisoners, including many Catholic priests, and nearly one-third were Jews.

Prisoners were divided into categories. At first, they were classified by the nature of the crime for which they were accused, but eventually were classified by the specific authority-type under whose command a person was sent to camp. Political prisoners who had been arrested by the Gestapo wore a red badge, "professional" criminals sent by the Criminal Courts wore a green badge, Cri-Po prisoners arrested by the criminal police wore a brown badge, "work-shy and asocial" people sent by the welfare authorities or the Gestapo wore a black badge, Jehovah's Witnesses arrested by the Gestapo wore a violet badge, homosexuals sent by the criminal courts wore a pink badge, emigrants arrested by the Gestapo wore a blue badge, "race polluters" arrested by the criminal court or Gestapo wore badges with a black outline, second-termers arrested by the Gestapo wore a bar matching the color of their badge, "idiots" wore a white armband with the label Blöd (Stupid), Romani wore a black triangle, and Jews, whose incarceration in the Dachau concentration camp dramatically increased after Kristallnacht, wore a yellow badge, combined with another color.

The average number of Germans in the camp during the war was 3,000. Just before the liberation many German prisoners were evacuated, but 2,000 of these Germans died during the evacuation transport. Evacuated prisoners included such prominent political and religious figures as Martin Niemöller, Kurt von Schuschnigg, Édouard Daladier, Léon Blum, Franz Halder, and Hjalmar Schacht.

==== Clergy ====
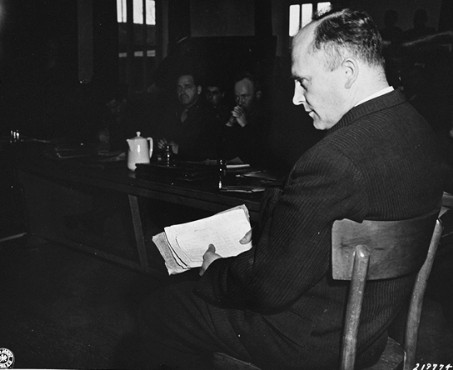
Priest Friedrich Hoffman testifies at the trial of former camp personnel and prisoners from Dachau. In his hand he holds records showing that hundreds of priests died at the camp after being exposed to malaria during Nazi medical experiments.

In an effort to counter the strength and influence of spiritual resistance, Nazi security services monitored clergy very closely. Priests were frequently denounced, arrested and sent to concentration camps, often simply on the basis of being "suspected of activities hostile to the State" or that there was reason to "suppose that his dealings might harm society". Despite SS hostility to religious observance, the Vatican and German bishops successfully lobbied the regime to concentrate clergy at one camp and obtained permission to build a chapel, for the priests to live communally and for time to be allotted to them for their religious and intellectual activity. Priests Barracks at Dachau were established in Blocks 26, 28 and 30, though only temporarily. 26 became the international block and 28 was reserved for Poles—the most numerous group.

Of a total of 2,720 clergy recorded as imprisoned at Dachau, the overwhelming majority, some 2,579 (or 94.88%) were Catholic. Among the other denominations, there were 109 Protestants, 22 Greek Orthodox, 8 Old Catholics and Mariavites and 2 Muslims. In his Dachau: The Official History 1933–1945, Paul Berben noted that R. Schnabel's 1966 investigation, Die Frommen in der Hölle ("The Pious Ones in Hell") found an alternative total of 2,771 and included the fate all the clergy listed, with 692 noted as deceased and 336 sent out on "invalid trainloads" and therefore presumed dead. Over 400 German priests were sent to Dachau. Total numbers incarcerated are nonetheless difficult to assert, for some clergy were not recognised as such by the camp authorities, and some—particularly Poles—did not wish to be identified as such, fearing they would be mistreated.

The Nazis introduced a racial hierarchy—keeping Poles in harsh conditions, while favoring German priests. 697 Poles arrived in December 1941, and a further 500 of mainly elderly clergy arrived in October the following year. Inadequately clothed for the bitter cold, of this group, only 82 survived. A large number of Polish priests were chosen for Nazi medical experiments. In November 1942, 20 were given phlegmons. 120 were used by Dr Schilling for malaria experiments between July 1942 and May 1944. Several Poles met their deaths with the "invalid trains" sent out from the camp, others were liquidated in the camp and given bogus death certificates. Some died of cruel punishment for misdemeanors—beaten to death or run to exhaustion.

==== Staff ====
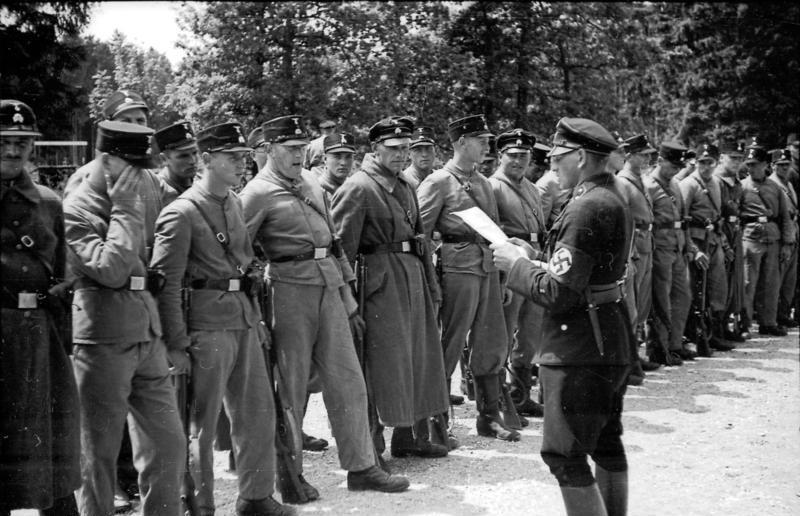
SS Guards arriving at the Dachau "Protective Custody" Camp 27 May 1933 (Photo: Friedrich Franz Bauer)

The camp staff consisted mostly of male SS, although 19 female guards served at Dachau as well, most of them until liberation. Sixteen have been identified including Fanny Baur, Leopoldine Bittermann, Ernestine Brenner, Anna Buck, Rosa Dolaschko, Maria Eder, Rosa Grassmann, Betty Hanneschaleger, Ruth Elfriede Hildner, Josefa Keller, Berta Kimplinger, Lieselotte Klaudat, Theresia Kopp, Rosalie Leimboeck, and Thea Miesl. Female guards were also assigned to the Augsburg Michelwerke, Burgau, Kaufering, Mühldorf, and Munich Agfa Camera Werke subcamps. In mid-April 1945, female subcamps at Kaufering, Augsburg, and Munich were closed, and the SS stationed the women at Dachau. Several Norwegians worked as guards at the Dachau camp.

In the major Dachau war crimes case (United States of America v. Martin Gottfried Weiss et al.), forty-two officials of Dachau were tried from November to December 1945. All were found guilty—thirty-six of the defendants were sentenced to death on 13 December 1945, of whom 23 were hanged on 28–29 May 1946, including the commandant, SS-Obersturmbannführer Martin Gottfried Weiss, SS-Obersturmführer Friedrich Wilhelm Ruppert and camp doctors Karl Schilling and Fritz Hintermeyer. Camp commandant Weiss admitted in affidavit testimony that most of the deaths at Dachau during his administration were due to "typhus, TB, dysentery, pneumonia, pleurisy, and body weakness brought about by lack of food." His testimony also admitted to deaths by shootings, hangings and medical experiments. Ruppert ordered and supervised the deaths of innumerable prisoners at Dachau main and subcamps, according to the War Crimes Commission official trial transcript. He testified about hangings, shootings and lethal injections, but did not admit to direct responsibility for any individual deaths. An anonymous Dutch prisoner contended that British Special Operations Executive (SOE) agent Noor Inayat Khan was cruelly beaten by SS officer Wilhelm Ruppert before being shot from behind; the beating may have been the actual cause of her death.

== Satellite camps and sub-camps ==
Satellite camps under the authority of Dachau were established in the summer and autumn of 1944 near armaments factories throughout southern Germany to increase war production. Dachau alone had more than 30 large subcamps, and hundreds of smaller ones, in which over 30,000 prisoners worked almost exclusively on armaments.

Overall, the Dachau concentration camp system included 123 sub-camps and Kommandos which were set up in 1943 when factories were built near the main camp to make use of forced labor of the Dachau prisoners. Out of the 123 sub-camps, eleven of them were called Kaufering, distinguished by a number at the end of each. All Kaufering sub-camps were set up to specifically build three underground factories (Allied bombing raids made it necessary for them to be underground) for a project called Ringeltaube (wood pigeon), which planned to be the location in which the German jet fighter plane, Messerschmitt Me 262, was to be built. In the last days of war, in April 1945, the Kaufering camps were evacuated and around 15,000 prisoners were sent up to the main Dachau camp. Typhus alone was estimated to have caused 15,000 deaths between December 1944 and April 1945. "Within the first month after the arrival of the American troops, 10,000 prisoners were treated for malnutrition and kindred diseases. In spite of this one hundred prisoners died each day during the first month from typhus, dysentery or general weakness".

As U.S. Army troops neared the Dachau sub-camp at Landsberg on 27 April 1945, the SS officer in charge ordered that 4,000 prisoners be murdered. Windows and doors of their huts were nailed shut. The buildings were then doused with gasoline and set afire. Prisoners who were naked or nearly so were burned to death, while some managed to crawl out of the buildings before dying. Earlier that day, as Wehrmacht troops withdrew from Landsberg am Lech, townspeople hung white sheets from their windows. Infuriated SS troops dragged German civilians from their homes and hanged them from trees.

== Liberation ==
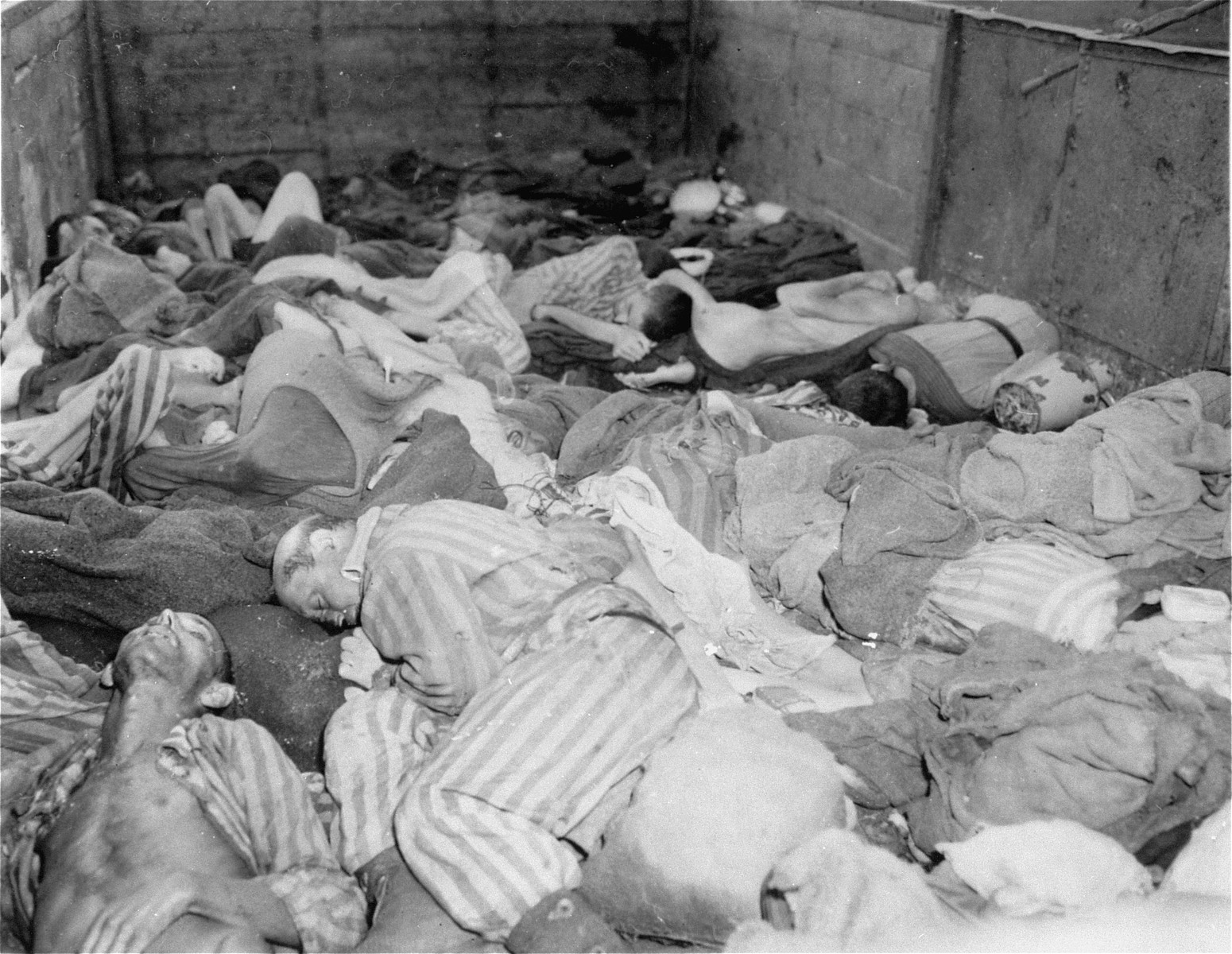
Bodies in the Dachau death train, after its arrival on April 28 in Dachau

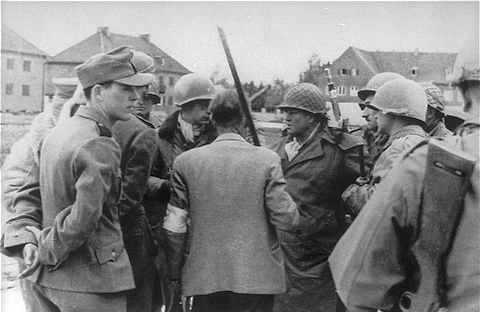
SS men confer with General Henning Linden (man with helmet, looking to his right) during the camp's liberation (29 April 1945)

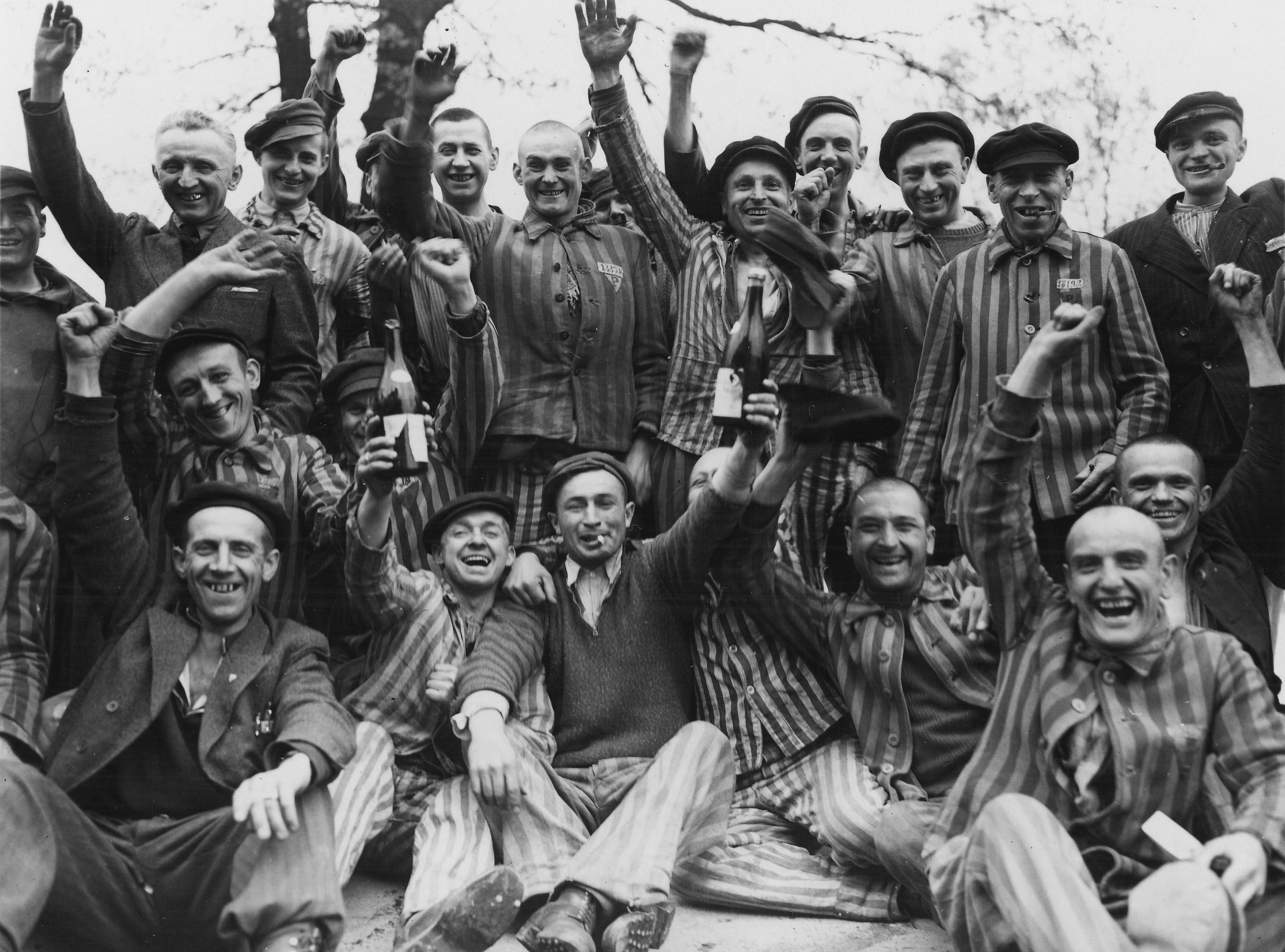
Polish prisoners at Dachau joyfully celebrating their liberation by the U.S. Army

=== Main camp ===
As the Allies began to advance on Nazi Germany, the SS began to evacuate the first concentration camps in summer 1944. Thousands of prisoners were killed before the evacuation due to being ill or unable to walk. At the end of 1944, the overcrowding of camps began to take its toll on the prisoners. The unhygienic conditions and the supplies of food rations became disastrous. In November a typhus fever epidemic broke out that took thousands of lives.

In the second phase of the evacuation, in April 1945, Himmler gave direct evacuation routes for remaining camps. Prisoners who were from the northern part of Germany were to be directed to the Baltic and North Sea coasts to be drowned. The prisoners from the southern part were to be gathered in the Alps, which was the location in which the SS wanted to resist the Allies. On 28 April 1945, an armed revolt took place in the town of Dachau. Both former and escaped concentration camp prisoners and a renegade Volkssturm (civilian militia) company took part. At about 8:30 am the rebels occupied the Town Hall. The SS gruesomely suppressed the revolt within a few hours.

Being fully aware that Germany was about to be defeated in World War II, the SS invested its time in removing evidence of the crimes it committed in the concentration camps. They began destroying incriminating evidence in April 1945 and planned on murdering the prisoners using codenames "Wolke A-I" (Cloud A-1) and "Wolkenbrand" (Cloud fire). However, these plans were not carried out. In mid-April, plans to evacuate the camp started by sending prisoners toward Tyrol. On 26 April, over 10,000 prisoners were forced to leave the Dachau concentration camp on foot, in trains, or in trucks. The largest group of some 7,000 prisoners was driven southward on a foot-march lasting several days. More than 1,000 prisoners did not survive this march. The evacuation transports cost many thousands of prisoners their lives.

On 26 April 1945 prisoner Karl Riemer fled the Dachau concentration camp to get help from American troops and on 28 April Victor Maurer, a representative of the International Red Cross, negotiated an agreement to surrender the camp to U.S. troops. That night a secretly formed International Prisoners Committee took over the control of the camp. Units of 3rd Battalion, 157th Infantry Regiment, 45th Infantry Division, commanded by Lieutenant Colonel Felix L. Sparks, were ordered to secure the camp. On 29 April Sparks led part of his battalion as they entered the camp over a side wall. At about the same time, Brigadier General Henning Linden led the 222nd Infantry Regiment of the 42nd (Rainbow) Infantry Division soldiers including his aide, Lieutenant William Cowling, to accept the formal surrender of the camp from German Lieutenant Heinrich Wicker at an entrance between the camp and the compound for the SS garrison. Linden was traveling with Marguerite Higgins and other reporters; as a result, Linden's detachment generated international headlines by accepting the surrender of the camp. More than 30,000 Jews and political prisoners were freed, and since 1945 adherents of the 42nd and 45th Division versions of events have argued over which unit was the first to liberate Dachau.

On 30 April 1945 (the day of Hitler's suicide), William Wilson Quinn, Chief of Staff of the G-2, IV Army Corps entered Dachau through the main gate with some of his officers in the 7th Army, a representative from the Office of Strategic Services and a group from his counter-intelligence corps division which was operating under his jurisdiction as G-2 of the 7th Army. He then commissioned each of those three divisions to separately prepare reports: "one was to take the camp; the other was to take the townspeople; the other was to take the organization and what happened and then to interrogate the internees".

When I read the three reports, I decided it was too big and I didn't have the time to put it all together so I decided to let each one of them tell their own story in their own way and I would do an introduction...The composition was the work of Major Al House, who just died not too long ago. He designed the cover, his concept of the SS. He did the artwork in the "townspeople" area of the German with the pipe and those drawings. The artwork was also done by John Denny and the copy preparation by Charles Denny. The photographs were the 163rd Signal Photo Company and the printing done by the 649th Engineer Compo. Battalion. This was done in the 7th Army, with government funds, so it's a free document and there is no copyright to it and anybody can reproduce it at their will...I published this in early June, or maybe late May...I issued this to the troops...the press got copies of it, because it was in the Press Room...I sent copies also to the other G-2's who had the same kind of thing in Auschwitz - William Wilson Quinn

After liberation, prisoners weakened beyond recovery by the starvation conditions continued to die. Two thousand cases of "the dread black typhus" had already been identified by 3 May, and the U.S. Seventh Army was "working day and night to alleviate the appalling conditions at the camp". Prisoners with typhus, a louse-borne disease with an incubation period from 12 to 18 days, were treated by the 116th Evacuation Hospital, while the 127th would be the general hospital for the other illnesses. There were 227 documented deaths among the 2,252 patients cared for by the 127th.

=== Satellite camps liberation ===
The first Dachau subcamp discovered by advancing Allied forces was Kaufering IV by the 12th Armored Division on 27 April 1945. Subcamps liberated by the 12th Armored Division included: Erpting, Schrobenhausen, Schwabing, Langerringen, Türkheim, Lauingen, Schwabach, Germering.

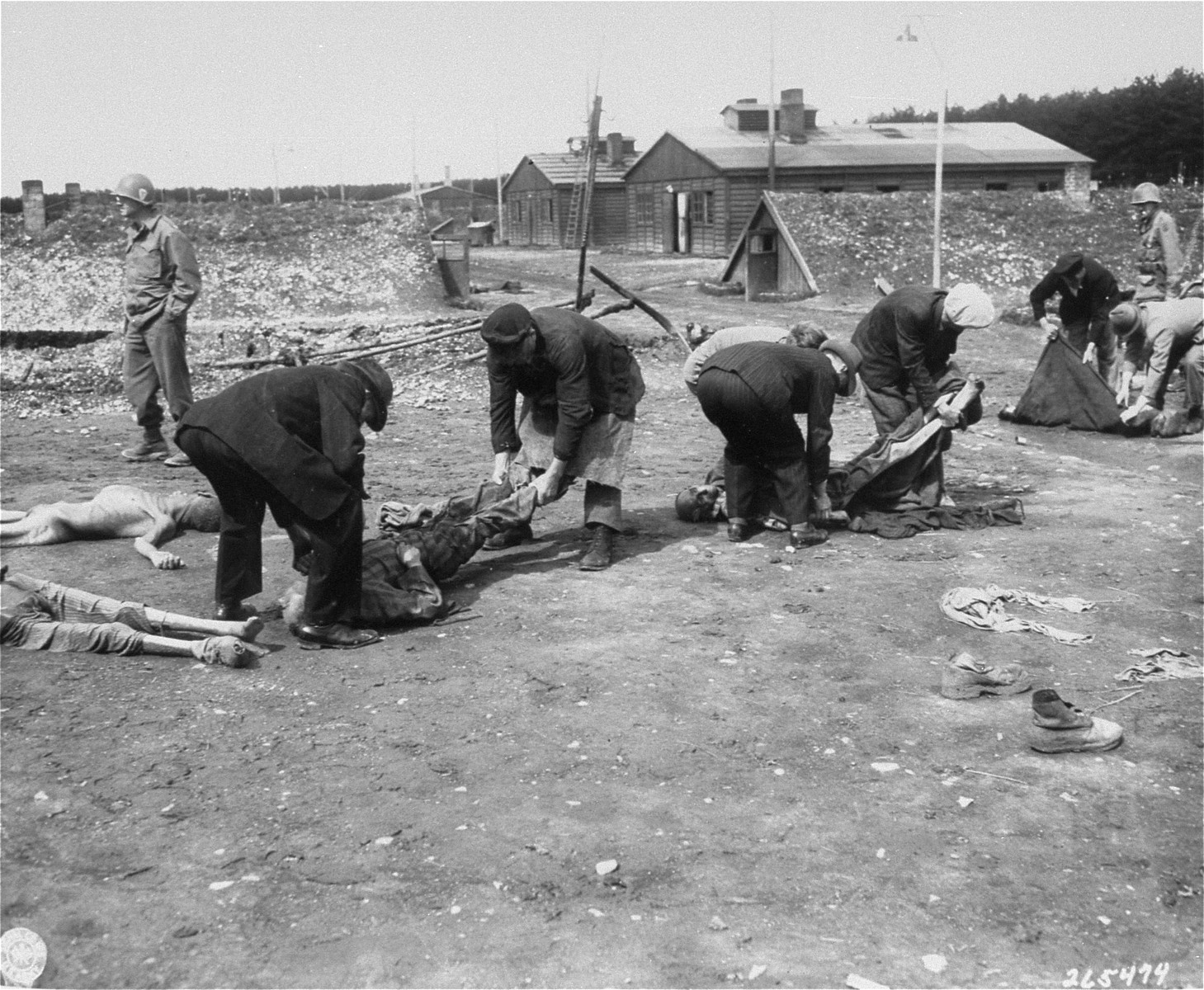
German civilians forced to bury Kaufering IV victims

During the liberation of the sub-camps surrounding Dachau, advance scouts of the U.S. Army's 522nd Field Artillery Battalion, a segregated battalion consisting of Nisei, 2nd generation Japanese-Americans, liberated the 3,000 prisoners of the "Kaufering IV Hurlach" slave labor camp. Persico describes an Office of Strategic Services (OSS) team (code name LUXE) leading Army Intelligence to a "Camp IV" on 29 April. "They found the camp afire and a stack of some four hundred bodies burning ... American soldiers then went into Landsberg and rounded up all the male civilians they could find and marched them out to the camp. The former commandant was forced to lie amidst a pile of corpses. The male population of Landsberg was then ordered to walk by, and ordered to spit on the commandant as they passed. The commandant was then turned over to a group of liberated camp survivors". The 522nd's personnel later discovered the survivors of a death march headed generally southwards from the Dachau main camp to Eurasburg, then eastwards towards the Austrian border on 2 May, just west of the town of Waakirchen.

Weather at the time of liberation was unseasonably cool and temperatures trended down through the first two days of May; on 2 May, the area received a snowstorm with 10 centimetres (4 in) of snow at nearby Munich. Proper clothing was still scarce and film footage from the time (as seen in The World at War) shows naked, gaunt people either wandering on snow or dead under it.

Due to the number of sub-camps over a large area that comprised the Dachau concentration camp complex, many Allied units have been officially recognized by the United States Army Center of Military History and the United States Holocaust Memorial Museum as liberating units of Dachau, including: the 4th Infantry Division, 36th Infantry Division, 42nd Infantry Division, 45th Infantry Division, 63rd Infantry Division, 99th Infantry Division, 103rd Infantry Division, 10th Armored Division, 12th Armored Division, 14th Armored Division, 20th Armored Division, and the 101st Airborne Division.

=== Killing of camp guards ===
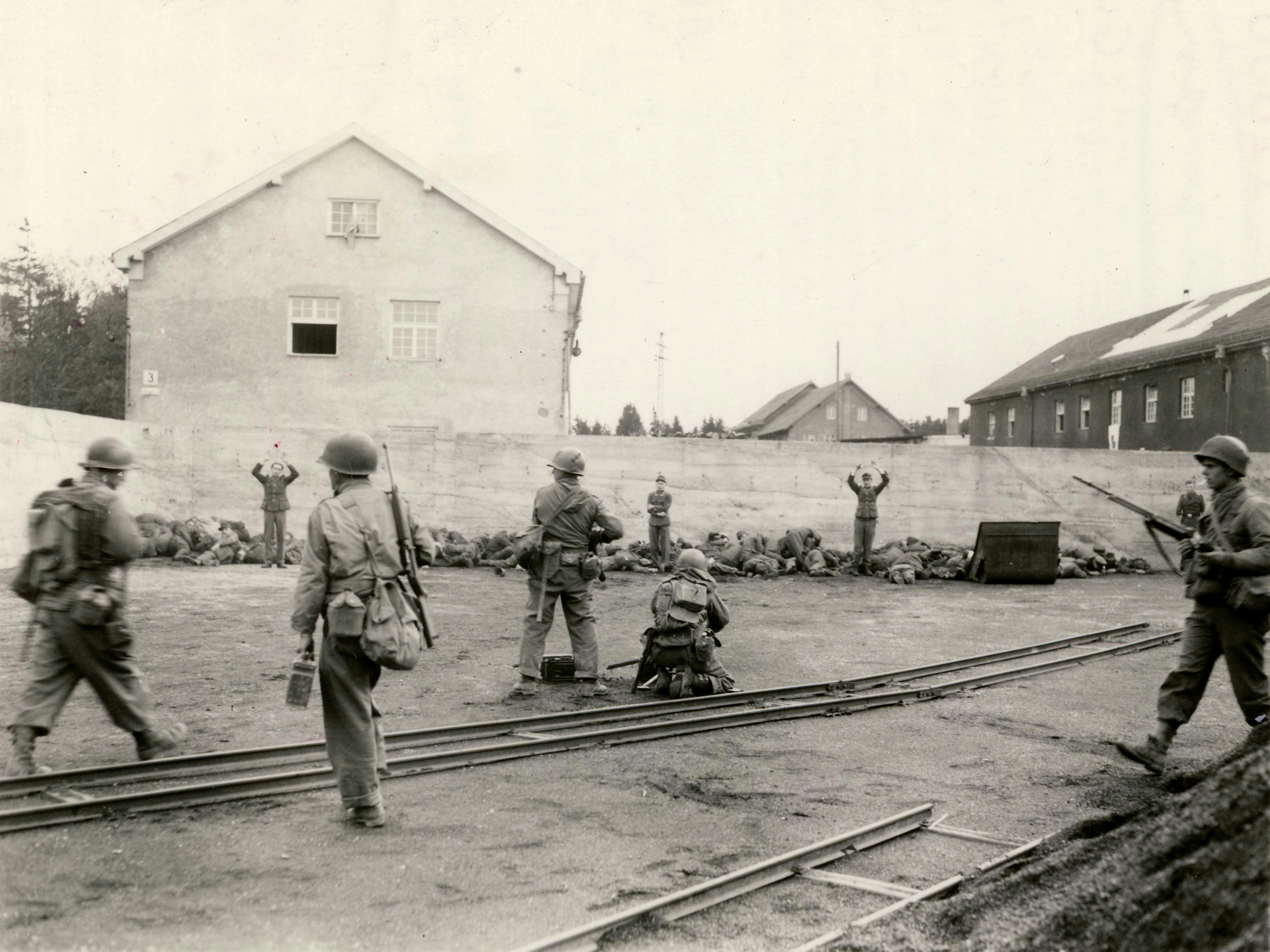
Photograph allegedly showing an unauthorized execution of SS troops in a coal yard in the area of the Dachau concentration camp during its liberation—part of the Dachau liberation reprisals. 29 April 1945 (U.S. Army photograph) (Note: The caption for the photograph in the U.S. National Archives reads, "SC208765, Soldiers of the 42nd Infantry Division, U.S. Seventh Army, order SS men to come forward when one of their number tried to escape from the Dachau, Germany, concentration camp after it was captured by U.S. forces. Men on the ground in background feign death by falling as the guards fired a volley at the fleeing SS men. (157th Regt. 4/29/45).")

American troops and liberated concentration camp prisoners killed some of the camp guards after they had surrendered. The number is disputed, as some were killed in combat, some while attempting to surrender, and others after their surrender was accepted. In 1989, Brigadier General Felix L. Sparks, the Colonel in command of a battalion that was present, stated:

The total number of German guards killed at Dachau during that day most certainly does not exceed fifty, with thirty probably being a more accurate figure. The regimental records of the 157th Field Artillery Regiment for that date indicate that over a thousand German prisoners were brought to the regimental collecting point. Since my task force was leading the regimental attack, almost all the prisoners were taken by the task force, including several hundred from Dachau.

An Inspector General report resulting from a US Army investigation conducted between 3 and 8 May 1945—titled "American Army Investigation of Alleged Mistreatment of German Guards at Dachau"—found that 21 plus "a number" of presumed SS men were killed, with others being wounded after their surrender had been accepted. In addition, 25 to 50 SS guards were estimated to have been killed by the liberated prisoners. Lee Miller visited the camp just after liberation, and photographed several guards who were killed by soldiers or prisoners.

According to Sparks, court-martial charges were drawn up against him and several other men under his command, but General George S. Patton, who had recently been appointed military governor of Bavaria, chose to dismiss the charges.

Colonel Charles L. Decker, an acting deputy judge advocate, concluded in late 1945 that, while war crimes had been committed at Dachau by Germany, "Certainly, there was no such systematic criminality among United States forces as pervaded the Nazi groups in Germany."

American troops also forced local citizens to the camp to see for themselves the conditions there and to help bury the dead. Many local residents were shocked about the experience and claimed no knowledge of the activities at the camp.

=== Post-liberation Easter ===
6 May 1945 (23 April on the Orthodox calendar) was the day of Pascha, Orthodox Easter. In a cell block used by Catholic priests to say daily Mass, several Greek, Serbian and Russian priests and one Serbian deacon, wearing makeshift vestments made from towels of the SS guard, gathered with several hundred Greek, Serbian and Russian prisoners to celebrate the Paschal Vigil. A prisoner named Rahr described the scene:

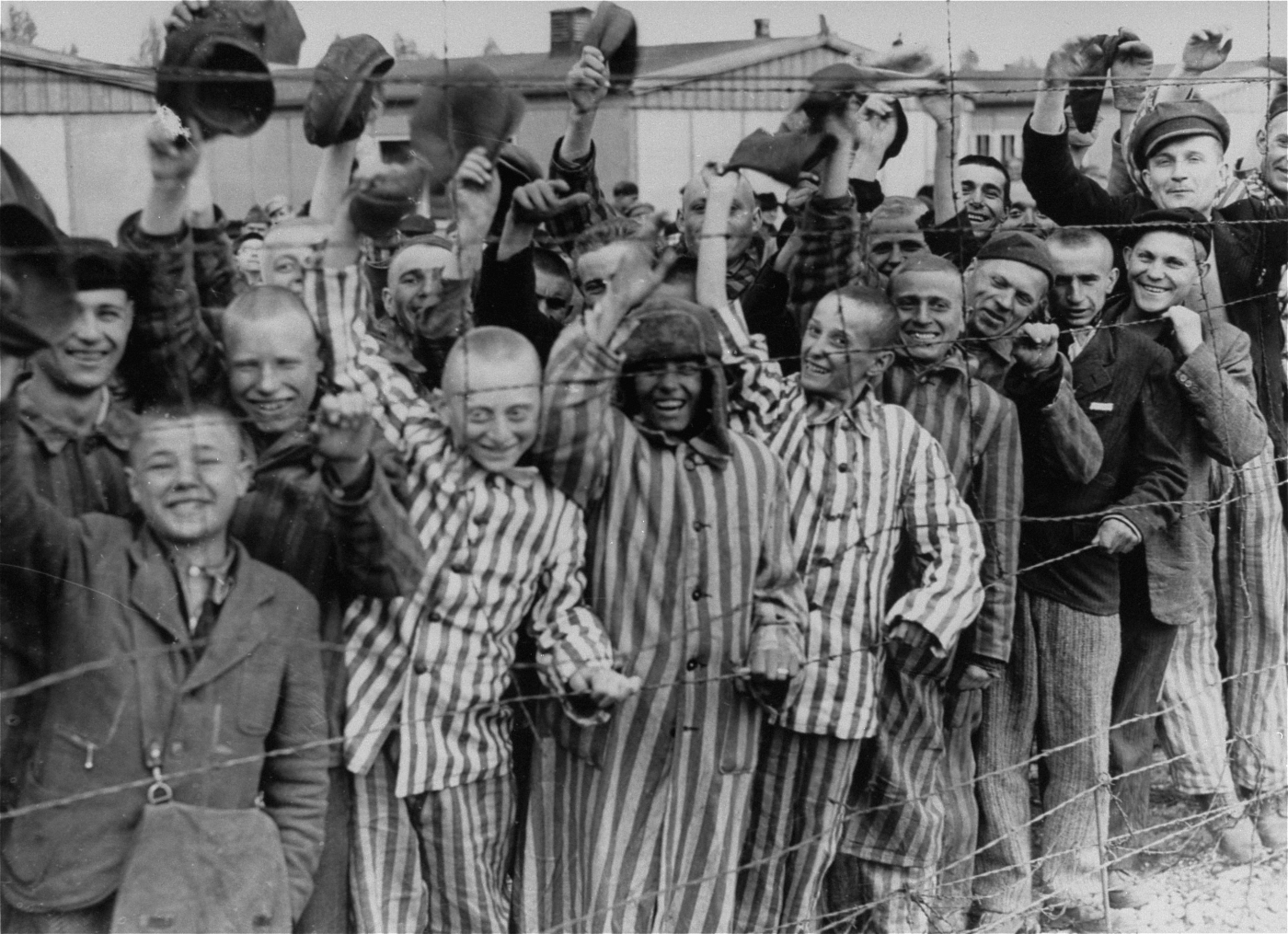
Liberated Dachau camp prisoners cheer U.S. troops

In the entire history of the Orthodox Church there has probably never been an Easter service like the one at Dachau in 1945. Greek and Serbian priests together with a Serbian deacon adorned the makeshift 'vestments' over their blue and gray-striped prisoners' uniforms. Then they began to chant, changing from Greek to Slavic, and then back again to Greek. The Easter Canon, the Easter Sticheras—everything was recited from memory. The Gospel—In the beginning was the Word—also from memory. And finally, the Homily of Saint John—also from memory. A young Greek monk from the Holy Mountain stood up in front of us and recited it with such infectious enthusiasm that we shall never forget him as long as we live. Saint John Chrysostomos himself seemed to speak through him to us and to the rest of the world as well!

There is a Russian Orthodox chapel at the camp today, and it is well known for its icon of Christ leading the prisoners out of the camp gates. (Note: The U.S. 7th Army's version of the events of the Dachau Liberation is available in Report of Operations of the Seventh United States Army, Vol. 3, p. 382.)

== After liberation ==
Footage from after liberation

Authorities worked night and day to alleviate conditions at the camp immediately following the liberation as an epidemic of black typhus swept through the prisoner population. Two thousand cases had already been reported by 3 May.

By October 1945, the former camp was being used by the U.S. Army as a place of confinement for war criminals, the SS and important witnesses. It was also the site of the Dachau Trials for German war criminals, a site chosen for its symbolism. In 1948, the Bavarian government established housing for refugees on the site, and this remained for many years. Among those held in the Dachau internment camp set up under the U.S. Army were Elsa Ehrich, Maria Mandl, and Elisabeth Ruppert. After 1948, when hundreds of thousands of ethnic Germans were expelled from eastern Europe, it held Germans from Czechoslovakia until they could be resettled. It also served as a military base for the United States, which maintained forces in the country. It was closed in 1960.

The Kaserne quarters and other buildings used by the guards and trainee guards were converted and served as the Eastman Barracks, an American military post. After the closure of the Eastman Barracks in 1974, these areas are now occupied by the Bavarian Bereitschaftspolizei (rapid response police unit).

=== Deportation of Soviet nationals ===
By January 1946, 18,000 members of the SS were being confined at the camp along with an additional 12,000 persons, including deserters from the Russian army and a number who had been captured in German Army uniform. The occupants of two barracks rioted as 271 of the Russian deserters were to be loaded onto trains that would return them to Russian-controlled lands, as agreed at the Yalta Conference. Inmates barricaded themselves inside two barracks. While the first was able to be cleared without too much trouble, those in the second building set fire to it, tore off their clothing in an effort to frustrate the guards, and linked arms to resist being removed from the building. Tear gas was used by the American soldiers before rushing the barracks, only for them to find that many had killed themselves. The American services newspaper Stars and Stripes reported:

The GIs quickly cut down most of those who had hanged themselves from the rafters. Those still conscious were screaming in Russian, pointing first at the guns of the guards, then at themselves, begging to us to shoot.

Ten of the soldiers killed themselves during the riot while another 21 attempted suicide, apparently with razor blades. Many had "cracked heads" inflicted by 500 American guards, in the attempt to bring the situation under control. One of those injured later died in a hospital. The New York Times reported on the death with the headline, "Russian Traitor Dies of Wounds".

== List of personnel ==
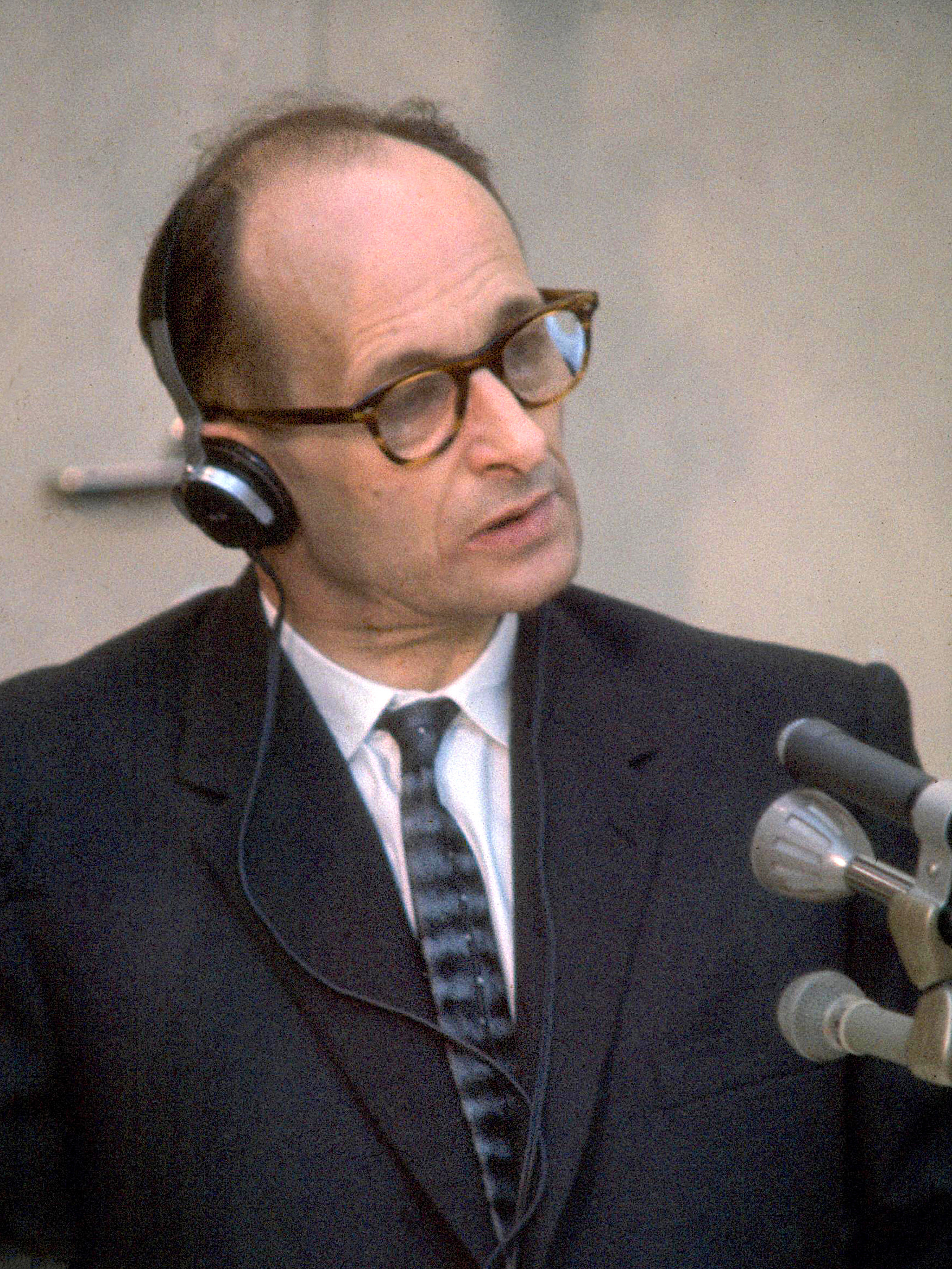
Adolf Eichmann on trial in 1961

=== Commandants ===
- SS-Standartenführer Hilmar Wäckerle (22 March 1933 – 26 June 1933)
- SS-Gruppenführer Theodor Eicke (26 June 1933 – 4 July 1934)
- SS-Oberführer Alexander Reiner (4 July 1934 – 22 October 1934)
- SS-Brigadeführer Berthold Maack (22 October 1934 – 12 January 1935)
- SS-Oberführer Heinrich Deubel (12 January 1935 – 31 March 1936)
- SS-Oberführer Hans Loritz (31 March 1936 – 7 January 1939)
- SS-Hauptsturmführer Alexander Piorkowski (7 January 1939 – 2 January 1942)
- SS-Obersturmbannführer Martin Weiß (3 January 1942 – 30 September 1943)
- SS-Hauptsturmführer Eduard Weiter (30 September 1943 – 26 April 1945)
- SS-Obersturmbannführer Martin Weiß (26 April 1945 – 28 April 1945)
- SS-Untersturmführer Heinrich Wicker (28 April 1945 – 29 April 1945)

=== Other staff ===
- Adolf Eichmann (29 January 1934 – October 1934)
- Rudolf Höss (1934–1938)
- Max Kögel (1937–1938)
- SS-Untersturmführer Hans Steinbrenner (1905–1964), brutal guard who greeted new arrivals with his improvized "Welcome Ceremony".
- SS-Obergruppenführer Gerhard Freiherr von Almey, half-brother of Ludolf von Alvensleben. Executed in 1955, in Moscow.
- Johannes Heesters (visited the camp and entertained the SS officers, was also given/giving tours)
- Otto Rahn (1937)
- SS-Untersturmführer Johannes Otto
- SS-Obersturmbannführer Johann Kantschuster was the arrest commandant in Dachau (1933–1939), went on to become camp commandant at Fort Breendonk, Belgium
- SS-Sturmbannführer Robert Erspenmüller, first warden of the guards and right-hand of Hilmar Wäckerle. Disagreed with Eicke and was transferred away.

=== SS and civilian doctors ===
- Dr. Werner Nuernbergk – First camp doctor, escaped charges for falsifying death certificates in 1933

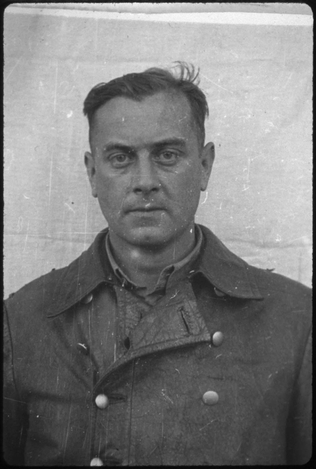
Dr. Hans Eisele in American internment

- SS-Untersturmführer Dr. Hans Eisele – (13 March 1912 – 3 May 1967) – Sentenced to death, but reprieved and released in 1952. Fled to Egypt after new accusations in 1958.
- SS-Obersturmführer Dr. Fritz Hintermayer – (28 Oct 1911 – 29 May 1946) – Executed by the Allies
- Dr. Ernst Holzlöhner – (23 February 1899 – 14 June 1945) – Committed suicide
- SS-Hauptsturmführer Dr. Fridolin Karl Puhr – (30 April 1913 – 31 May 1957) – Sentenced to death, later commuted to 10-years imprisonment
- SS-Untersturmführer Dr. Sigmund Rascher – (12 February 1909 – 26 April 1945) – Executed by the SS
- Dr. Claus Schilling – (25 July 1871 – 28 May 1946) – Executed by the Allies
- SS-Sturmbannführer Dr. Horst Schumann – (11 May 1906 – 5 May 1983) – Escaped to Ghana, later extradited to West Germany
- SS-Obersturmführer Dr. Helmuth Vetter – (21 March 1910 – 2 February 1949) – Executed by the Allies
- SS-Sturmbannführer Dr. Wilhelm Witteler – (20 April 1909 – 13 May 1993) – Sentenced to death, later commuted to 20-years imprisonment
- SS-Sturmbannführer Dr. Waldemar Wolter – (19 May 1908 – 28 May 1947) – Executed by the Allies

== Memorial ==
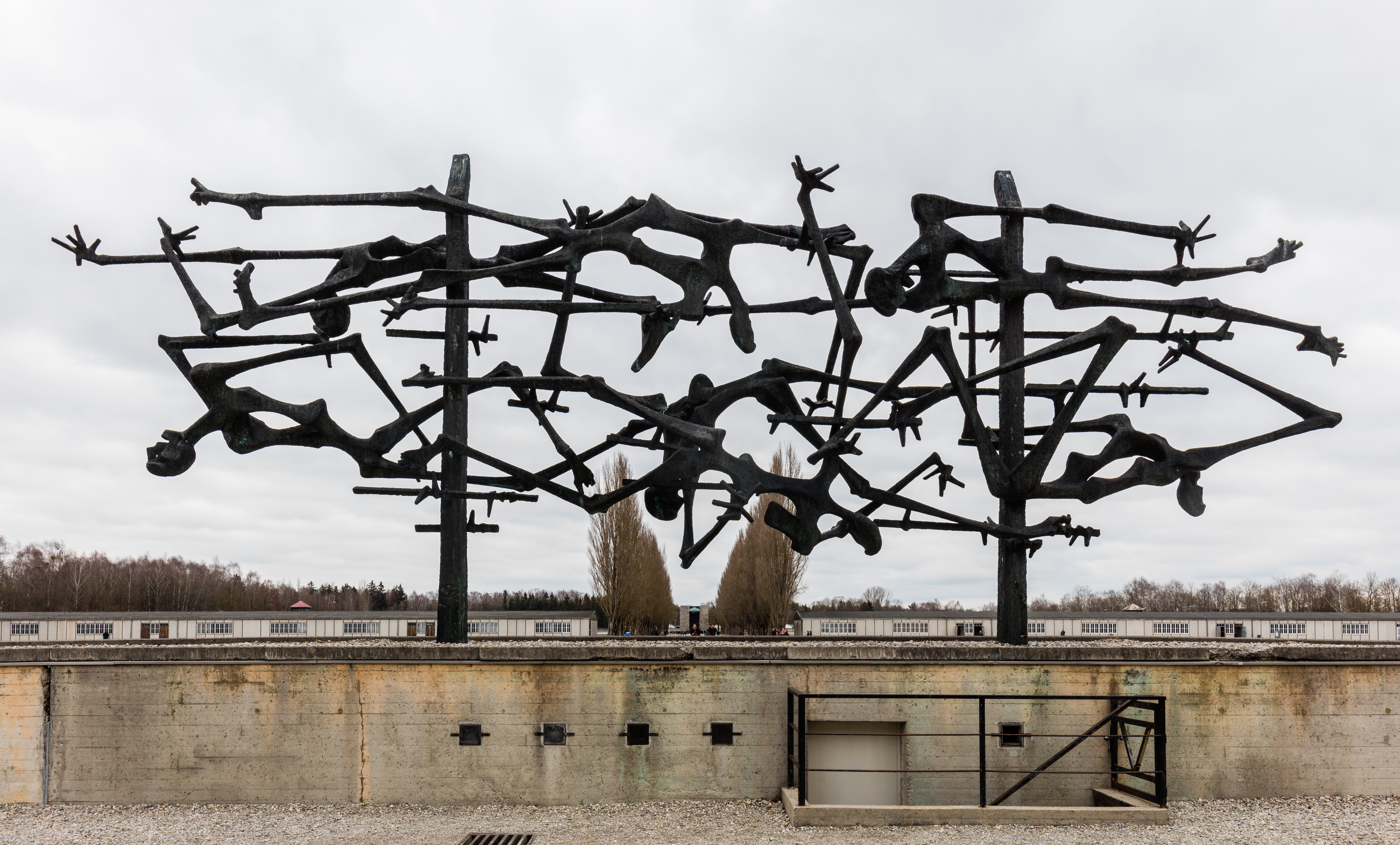
Memorial sculpture by Nandor Glid erected in 1968

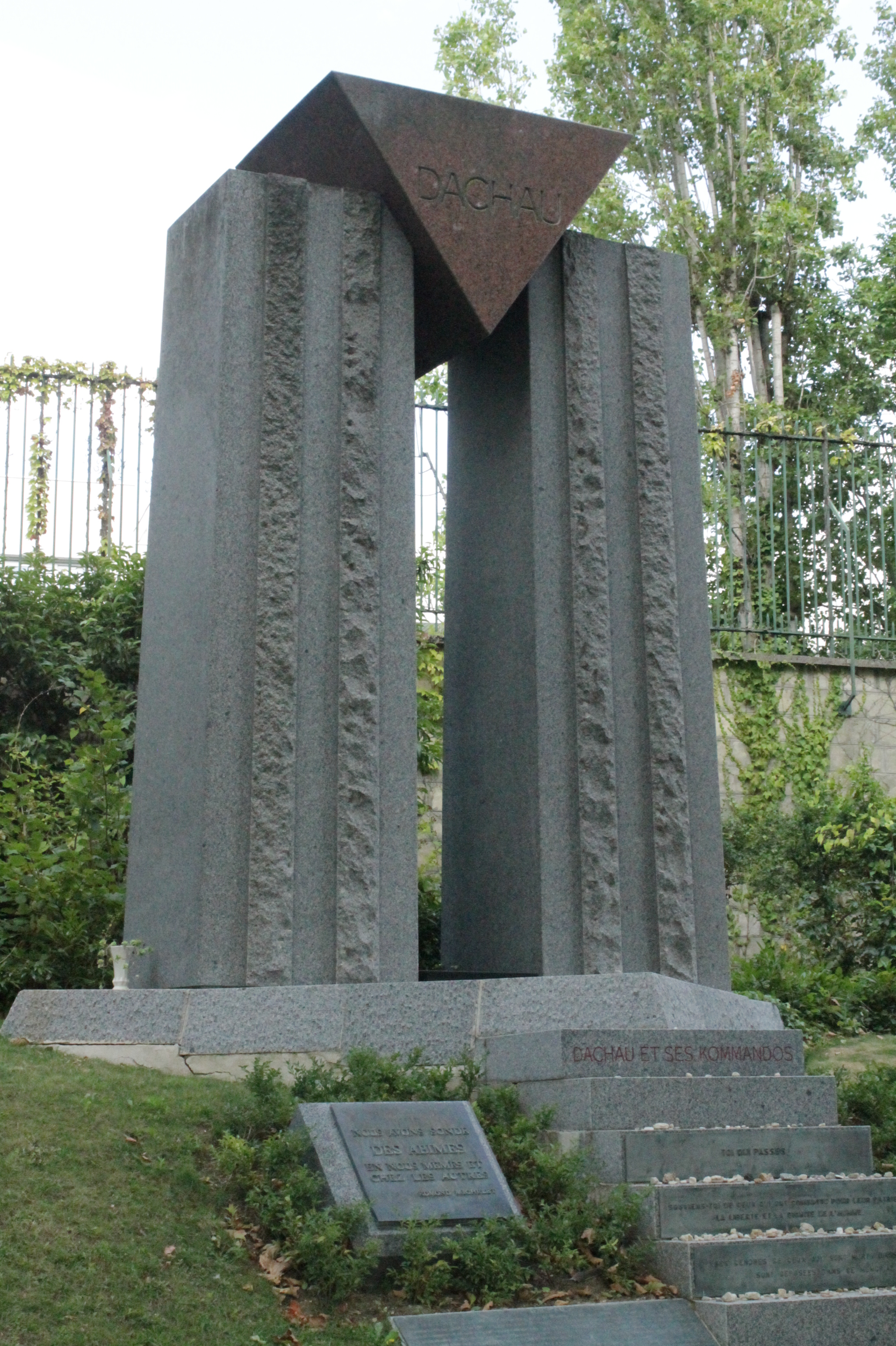
Memorial to the French victims of Dachau Concentration Camp at Pere Lachaise Cemetery in Paris

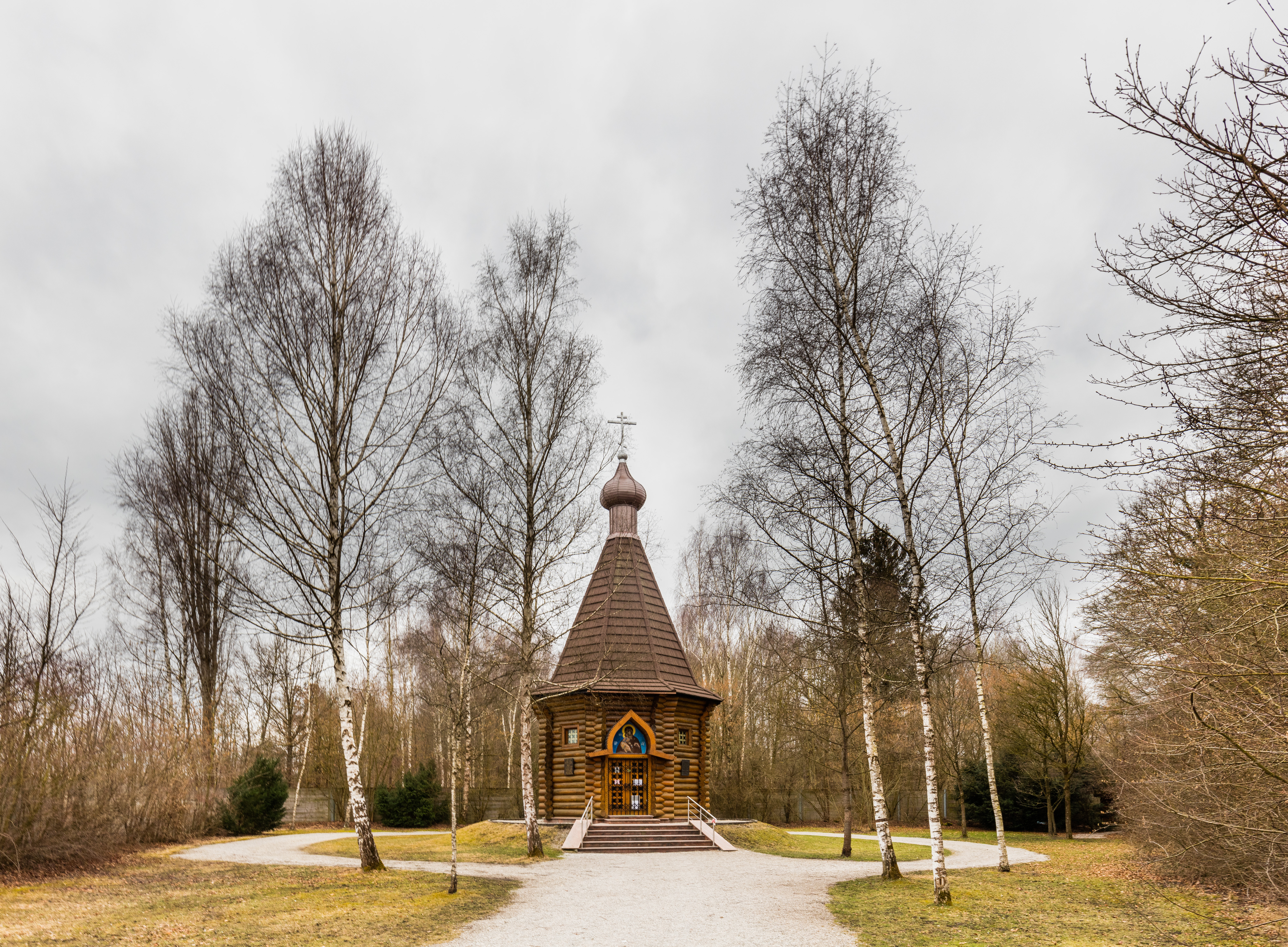
Orthodox chapel in the memorial

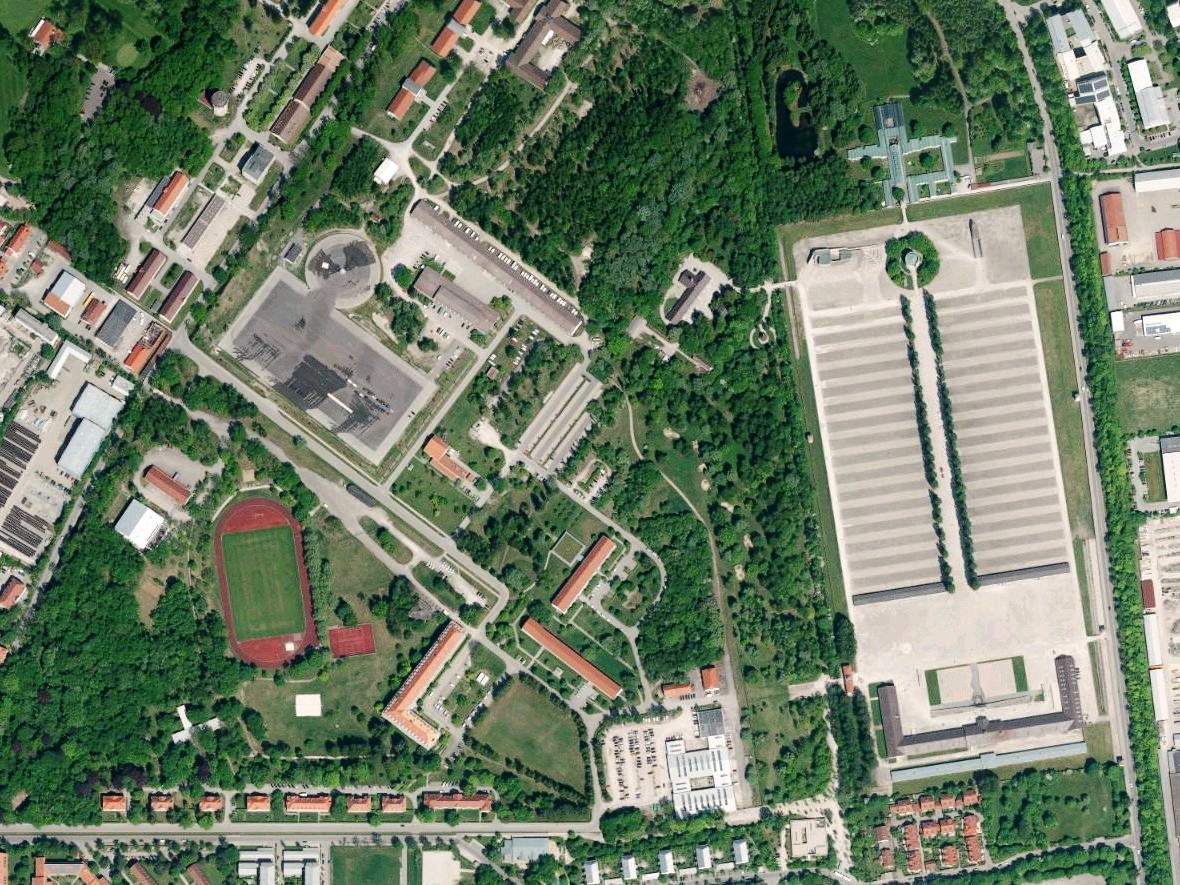
Aerial photo of the memorial in 2012

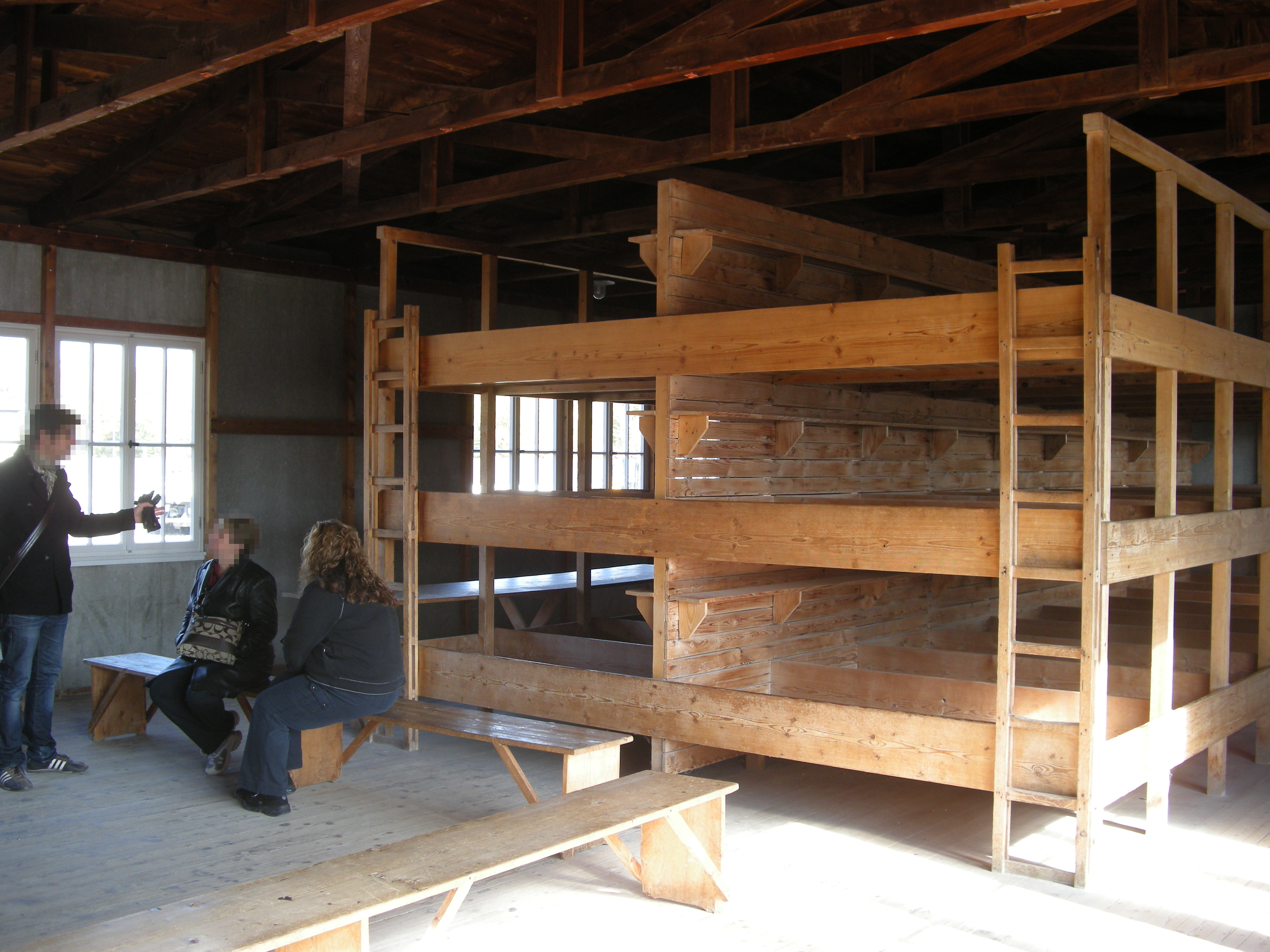
Reconstructed shack with bunk beds (October 2011)

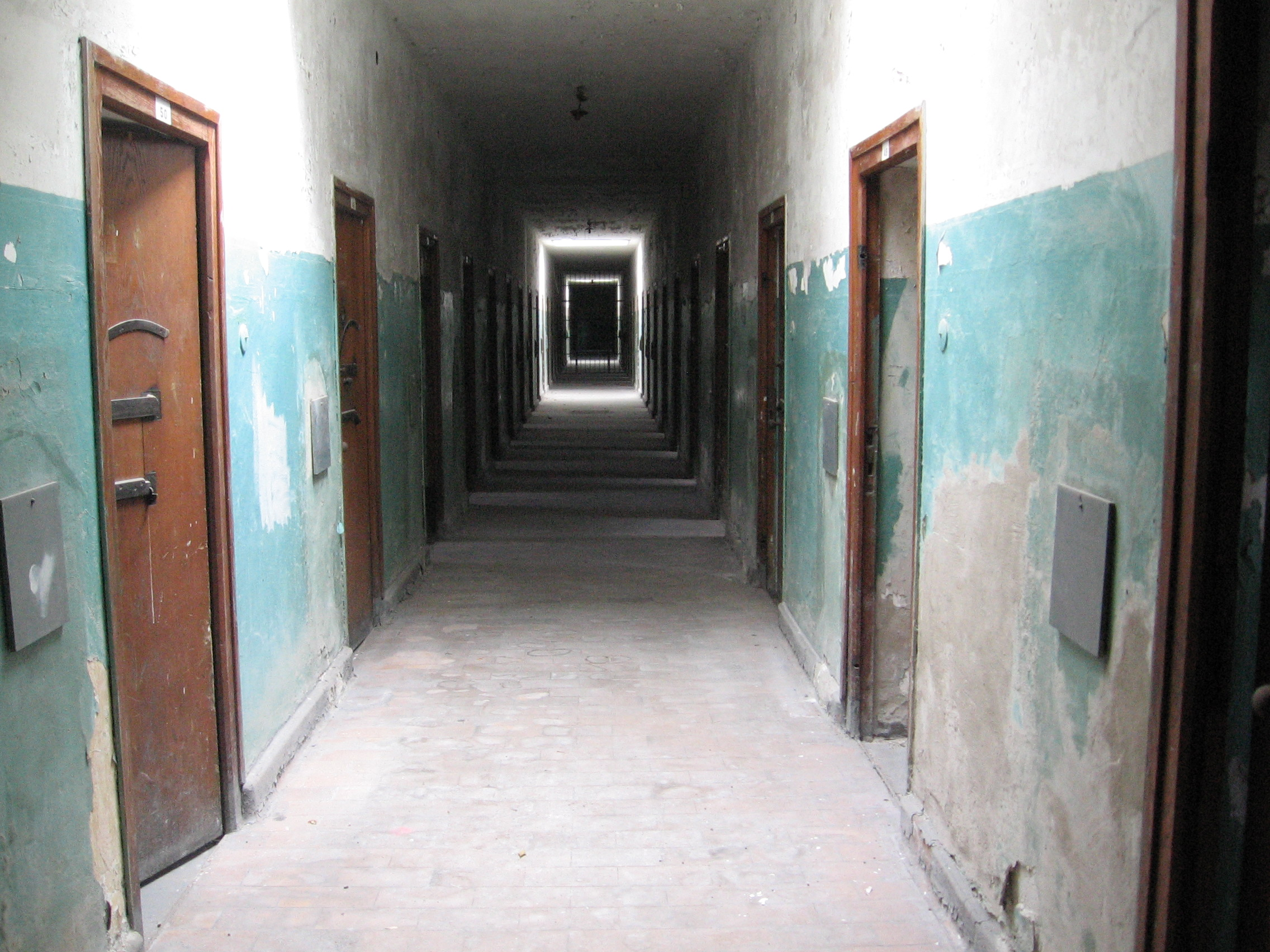
The hallway of a Dachau bunker.

Between 1945 and 1948 when the camp was handed over to the Bavarian authorities, many accused war criminals and members of the SS were imprisoned at the camp. Owing to the severe refugee crisis mainly caused by the expulsions of ethnic Germans, the camp was used from late 1948 to house some two thousand Germans from Czechoslovakia (mainly from the Sudetenland). This settlement was called Dachau-East and remained until the mid-1960s. During this time, former prisoners banded together to erect a memorial on the site of the camp. The display, which was reworked in 2003, follows the path of new arrivals to the camp. Two of the barracks have been rebuilt and one shows a cross-section of the entire history of the camp since the original barracks had to be torn down due to their poor condition when the memorial was built. The other 30 barracks are indicated by low cement curbs filled with pebbles. Visitors may now walk through the buildings and view the ovens used to cremate bodies, which hid the evidence of many deaths.

== In media ==
- In his 2013 autobiography, Moose: Chapters from My Life, in the chapter entitled, "Dachau", author Robert B. Sherman chronicles his experiences as an American Army serviceman during the initial hours of Dachau's liberation.
- In Maus, Vladek describes his time interned at Dachau, among his time at other concentration camps. He describes the journey to Dachau in over-crowded trains, trading rations for other goods and favors to stay alive, and contracting typhus.
- Frontline: "Memory of the Camps" (7 May 1985, Season 3, Episode 18), is a 56-minute television documentary that addresses Dachau and other Nazi concentration camps

== See also ==
- Karl von Eberstein
- List of Nazi concentration camps
- List of subcamps of Dachau

== Bibliography ==
- Bishop, Lt. Col. Leo V.; Glasgow, Maj. Frank J.; Fisher, Maj. George A., eds. (1946). The Fighting Forty-Fifth: the Combat Report of an Infantry Division. Baton Rouge, Louisiana.: 45th Infantry Division [Army & Navy Publishing Co.] OCLC 4249021.
- Buechner, Howard A. (1986). Dachau—The Hour of the Avenger. Thunderbird Press. ISBN 0913159042.
- Dillon, Christopher (2015). Dachau and the SS: A Schooling in Violence. Oxford: Oxford University Press. ISBN 978-0199656523.
- Kozal, Czesli W. (2004). Memoir of Fr. Czesli W. (Chester) Kozal, O.M.I. Translated by Ischler, Paul. Missionary Oblates of Mary Immaculate. OCLC 57253860.
- Marcuse, Harold (2001). Legacies of Dachau: The Uses and Abuses of a Concentration Camp, 1933–2001. Cambridge University Press. ISBN 978-0521552042.
- Neuhäusler, Johann (1960). What Was It Like in the Concentration Camp at Dachau?: An Attempt to Come Closer to the Truth. Munich: Manz A.G.
- Timothy W. Ryback (2015). Hitler's First Victims: The Quest for Justice. Vintage. ISBN 978-0804172004.
- Roberts, Donald R (2008). Heather R. Biola (ed.). The other war, a World War II journal. Elkins, WV: McClain Printing Co. ISBN 978-0870127755. Includes report written for: United States. Army. Infantry Division, 9th. Office of the Surgeon. Interrogation of SS Officers and Men at Dachau.
- Headquarters Third US Army and Eastern Military District, Office of the Judge Advocate. "Review of Proceedings of General Military Court in the Case of United States vs. Martin Weiss et.al." (PDF).("US v. Weiss")
- The United Nations War Crimes Commission (1949). Law Reports of Trials of War Criminals, vol. XI (PDF). His Majesty's Stationery Office. ("UN War Crimes Commission")
