= Hilmar Wäckerle =

Commandant of Dachau concentration camp

Hilmar Wäckerle (24 November 1899 – 2 July 1941) was a commander in the Waffen-SS of Nazi Germany during World War II. He was the first commandant of Dachau concentration camp.

== War service ==
The son of a Munich notary public, Wäckerle was sent to the Bavarian Army officer school at the age of 14 in order to pursue his chosen career. Having completed his three years as a cadet he was assigned to the Bavarian Infantry Battalion in August 1917 and by the following year was a Sergeant on the Western Front. Seriously wounded in September 1918 he was not able to return to the front before the armistice and as such his chance to matriculate and become an officer was lost.

== Political involvement ==
Unable to continue in the army, Wäckerle enrolled in the Technical University of Munich to study agriculture. Like his classmate Heinrich Himmler, he joined the anti-communist Freikorps Oberland and was an early member of the Nazi Party. Wäckerle was present during the Beer Hall Putsch, as well as the January 1924 assassination attempt on Franz Josef Heinz, the prime minister of the French-administered Saar. After his graduation aged 25, Wäckerle scaled back his direct involvement in Nazi politics to become manager of a cattle ranch. He rejoined the Nazi Party in 1925, however, following its reorganisation and he regularly attended party rallies whilst also helping to draft Nazi agricultural policy. He also signed up with the SS volunteer regiment based in Kempten.

== Dachau ==
In 1933 Wäckerle was picked by his old ally Himmler to be commandant of the newly established Dachau concentration camp. Under orders from Himmler, he established 'special' rules for dealing with prisoners, rules that instituted terror as a way of life at the camp. His initiatives included execution of four prisoners for 'violent insubordination' and 'incitement to disobedience' for which he was charged criminally. He left the post a few months later, with Theodor Eicke taking his place.

== Waffen-SS ==
Wäckerle was an early member of the units that became the Waffen-SS and finally came to be an officer with this group, serving in the Netherlands. He led his SS-battalion during the breakthrough of the Dutch Grebbe-line and was wounded in the process. He also served in the invasion of the Soviet Union. His service was spent with the 5th SS Panzer Division Wiking. He had reached the rank of Standartenführer by the time he was killed in action near Lviv in 1941.

Following Wäckerle's death, his widow Elfriede moved in with another man, instead of mourning her dead husband. Outraged by this break from protocol, Himmler had the man sent to a concentration camp.
