= Hans Steinbrenner (SS member) =

Johannes 'Hans' Steinbrenner (16 October 1905 - 12 June 1964) was a German concentration camp overseer. Born in Frankfurt am Main, he is most notable for his participation in the murder of several prisoners during the early phases of Dachau concentration camp. In April 1945, Steinbrenner was arrested by the US Army as head of the administration of an SS. In 1948, he was charged with murder, albeit the prosecution was delayed for several years. In 1952, Steinbrenner was found guilty of two counts of murder and nine counts of serious bodily harm, and sentenced to life in prison. A codefendant, Johann Unterhuber, was sentenced to six years in prison on lesser charges.

Steinbrenner served his sentence at Landsberg Prison. He was released from prison in 1962 and hanged himself two years later.

== Bibliography ==
- (in English) Christopher Dillon: Dachau and the SS: A Schooling in Violence. Oxford University Press, Oxford 2015, ISBN 978-0-19-879452-3.
- (in English) Kim Wünschmann: Before Auschwitz: Jewish Prisoners in the Prewar Concentration Camps. Harvard University Press, Harvard 2015, ISBN 978-0674967595.
- (in German) Jörg Döring, Markus Joch (ed.s): Alfred Andersch revisited. Werkbiographische Studien im Zeichen der Sebald-Debatte. De Gruyter, Berlin 2011, ISBN 978-3-11-026826-3.
- (in German) Klaus Drobisch, Günther Wieland: System der NS-Konzentrationslager, 1933–1939. Akademie Verlag, Berlin 1993, ISBN 3-05-000823-7.
- (in German) Hans Günther Richardi: Schule der Gewalt. Das Konzentrationslager Dachau, 1995.
