= Dachau liberation reprisals =

1945 mass killing of SS guards by US soldiers

Coordinates: 48°16′19.4″N 11°27′29.9″E

- Part of World War II
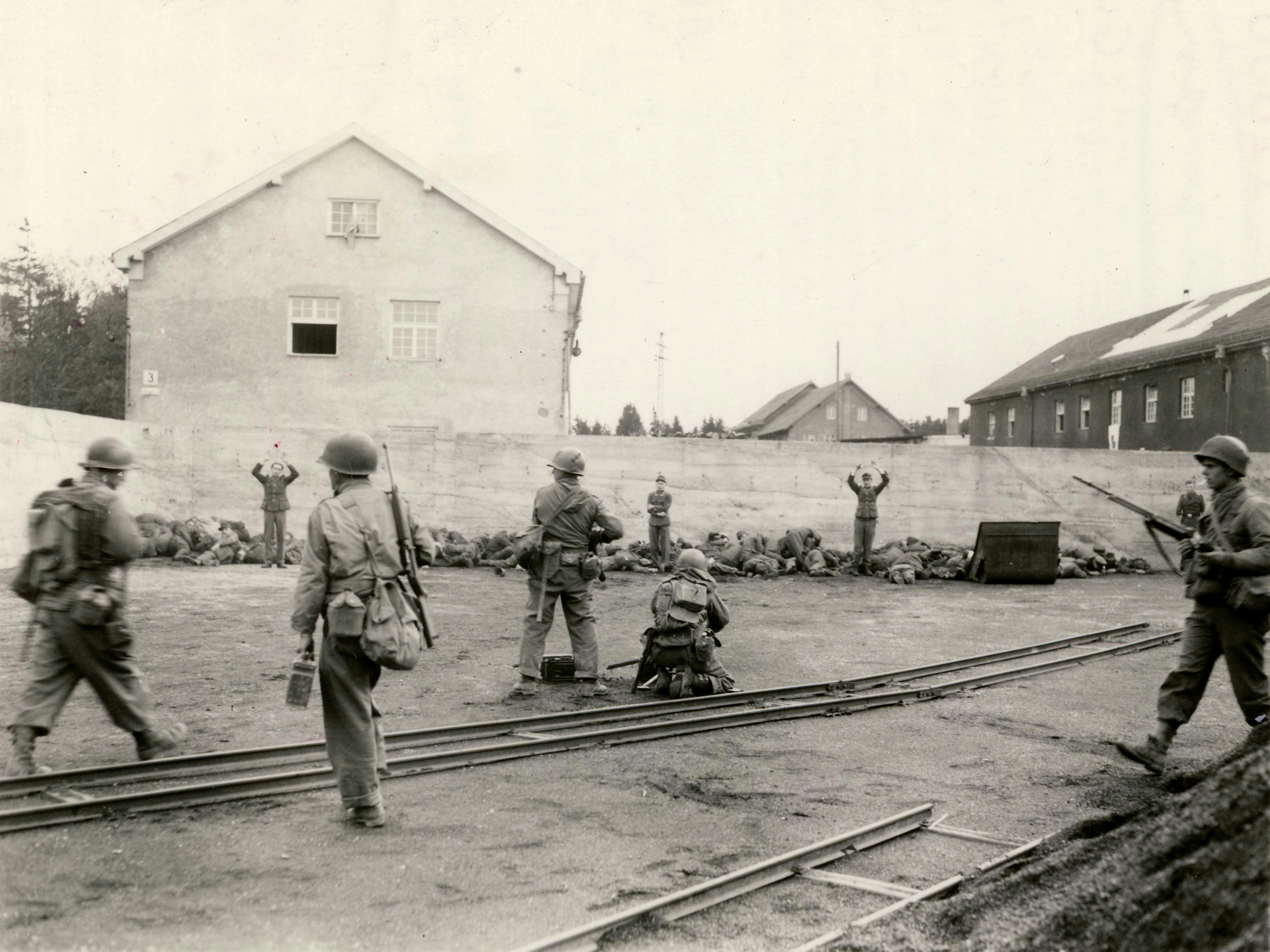
- Soldiers of the U.S. Seventh Army guard SS prisoners in a coal yard at Dachau concentration camp during its liberation. April 29, 1945 (U.S. Army photograph) (Note: The caption for the photograph in the U.S. National Archives reads, "SC208765, Soldiers of the 45th Infantry Division, U.S. Seventh Army, order SS men to come forward when one of their number tried to escape from the Dachau, Germany, concentration camp after it was captured by U.S. forces. Men on the ground in background feign death by falling as the guards fired a volley at the fleeing SS men. (157th Regt. 4/29/45).")
- Location: Dachau concentration camp
- Date: April 29, 1945
- Target: SS personnel
- Attack type: Massacre; Summary executions Vigilantism
- Deaths: ~35–50
- Perpetrators: United States Army; Former Dachau prisoners
- Motive: Outrage; Revenge

During the Dachau liberation reprisals, (Note: The incident at Dachau does not meet the legal definition of reprisal, an illegal act conducted to dissuade an enemy nation from performing its own illegal acts. The massacre was not officially sanctioned by the US military or government, and there was no explicit intention for the actions of US troops there to have a political effect on the enemy's conduct.) German SS troops were killed by outraged U.S. soldiers and concentration camp prisoners at the Dachau concentration camp on April 29, 1945, during World War II. It is unclear how many SS guards were killed in the incident, but most estimates place the number killed at around 35 to 50. In the days before the camp's liberation, SS guards at the camp had forced 7,000 inmates on a death march that resulted in the death of many from exposure and shooting. When Allied soldiers liberated Dachau, they were variously shocked, horrified, disturbed, and infuriated at finding the massed corpses of prisoners, and by the combativeness of some of the remaining guards who allegedly fired on them.

== Discoveries ==
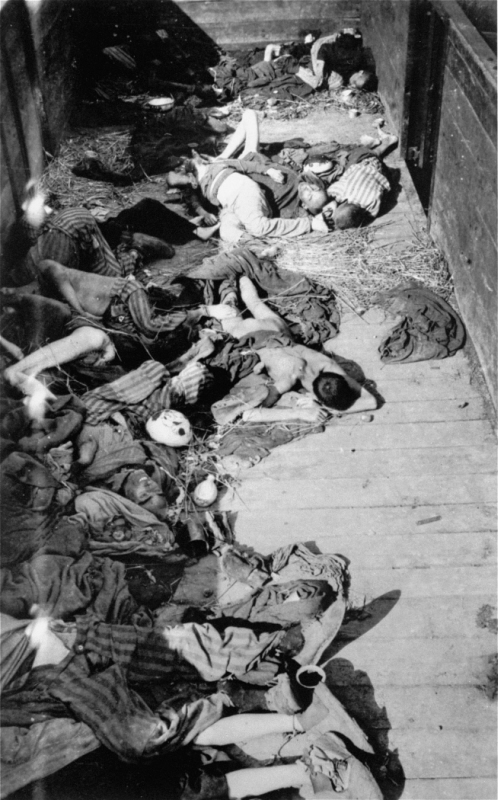
Corpses of prisoners who were left by their German guards to die in a train at Dachau. Thousands of prisoners were murdered by the Germans in the days before the camp's liberation.

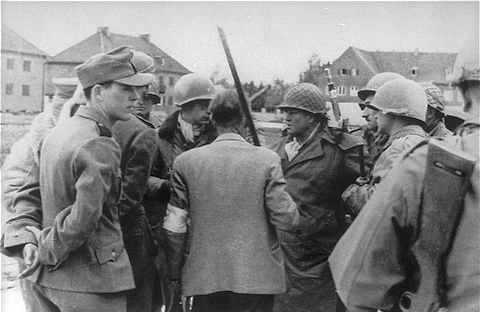
SS men confer with American Brigadier General Henning Linden during the capture of the Dachau concentration camp. Pictured from left to right: SS aide, camp leader SS-Untersturmführer Heinrich Wicker (mostly hidden by the aide), Paul M. G. Lévy, a Belgian journalist (man with helmet looking to his left), Dr. Victor Maurer (back), Brig. Gen. Henning Linden (man with helmet, looking to his right) and some U.S. soldiers.

On April 29, 1945, scouts of the 522nd Field Artillery Battalion located a satellite camp next to the small Bavarian town of Lager Lechfeld, adjacent to Hurlach. Afterwards, soldiers of the 3rd Battalion, 157th Infantry Regiment, 45th Infantry Division, commanded by Lieutenant Colonel Felix L. Sparks, approaching the sprawling Dachau complex from the southwest, found 39 railway boxcars containing some 2,000 skeletal corpses parked on rail tracks just outside the complex itself. Brain tissue was splattered on the ground from one victim found nearby with a crushed skull. The smell of decaying bodies and human excrement and the sight of naked, emaciated bodies induced vomiting, crying, disbelief, and rage in the advancing troops. Advancing soldiers from H Company, 22nd Regiment, used a loudspeaker to call on the SS to surrender, but they continued to fire in bursts.

Upon moving deeper into the complex, and the prisoner area itself, the soldiers found more bodies. Some had been dead for hours or days before the camp's capture and lay where they had died. Soldiers reported seeing a row of concrete structures that contained rooms full of hundreds of naked and barely clothed dead bodies piled floor to ceiling, a coal-fired crematorium, and a gas chamber. "The stench of death was overpowering," Sparks recalled.

== Surrender ==
Two days prior to the liberation, Obersturmbannführer Eduard Weiter had already begun evacuating the camp, prioritizing Russian POWs and Jewish prisoners as they were considered the most dangerous in the event of a liberation by American soldiers. According to American professor of German history Harold Marcuse, SS-Hauptsturmführer Martin Weiss, who had been left in command of the camp, together with the camp guards and the SS garrisons, had also fled before the arrival of U.S. troops. SS-Untersturmführer Heinrich Wicker (killed after the surrender) was left in charge and had roughly 560 personnel at his disposal; these came from conscripted inmates of the SS disciplinary prison inside the Dachau concentration camp and Hungarian Waffen-SS troops.

On April 29, Dachau was surrendered to Brigadier General Henning Linden of the 42nd Infantry Division of the U.S. Army by Untersturmführer Wicker. According to Linden, he arrived at the command post in Dachau at about 15:00 and crossed the Amper River to the complex, about 500 meters south of the bridge he crossed. He took control of the camp then toured the camp with a group of reporters (including war correspondent Marguerite Higgins). A description of the surrender appears in Linden's memorandum to Maj. Gen. Harry J. Collins, entitled Report on Surrender of Dachau Concentration Camp:

As we approached the southwest corner, three people came forward with a flag of truce. We met them about 75 yards north of the southwest corner. These three people were a Swiss Red Cross representative, Victor Maurer, and two SS troopers who said they were the camp commander and his assistant. They had come here on the night of the 28th to take over from the regular camp personnel for the purpose of surrendering the camp to the advancing Americans. The Swiss Red Cross representative said there were about 100 SS guards in the camp who had their arms stacked except for the people in the tower.... He had given instructions that there would be no shots fired and it would take about 50 men to relieve the guards, as there were 42,000 "half-crazed" inmates, many of them typhus infected... He asked if I were an officer. I replied, "I am Assistant Division Commander of the 42nd Infantry Division and will accept the surrender of the camp in the name of the Rainbow Division for the United States Army...."

== Capture communiqué ==
Supreme Allied Commander General Dwight D. Eisenhower issued a communiqué regarding the capture of Dachau concentration camp: "Our forces liberated and mopped up the infamous concentration camp at Dachau. Approximately 32,000 prisoners were liberated; 300 SS camp guards were quickly neutralized."

Military historian Earl Ziemke describes the event:

The Americans came on April 29, a Sunday. Work had stopped in the camp on Wednesday, and an evacuation was being organized. One transport of 4,000 prisoners was able to get away, but the 42nd and 45th Infantry Divisions covered the 40 miles from the Danube faster than the Germans expected. At noon on Sunday the camp was quiet, and the SS guards were at their posts in the towers when the cry "Americans!" went up. A prisoner rushed toward the gate, and a guard shot him. Outside, a single American soldier stood looking casually at the towers while the guards eyed him and others who were two or three hundred yards away. When the Americans opened fire, the guards in the gate tower came down, hands in the air. One held a pistol behind his back, and the first American shot him. In the next few minutes a jeep drove up; in it were a blonde female war correspondent and a chaplain. The chaplain asked the prisoners, now crowding to the gate, to join him in the Lord's Prayer. ...Troops of the 42nd and 45th Divisions who liberated Dachau in the afternoon on 29 April were fighting in Munich the next morning and by nightfall had, along with XV Corps' other three divisions, captured the city that was the capital of Bavaria and the birthplace of Nazism.

— Earl F. Ziemke

== Killings by U.S. soldiers ==
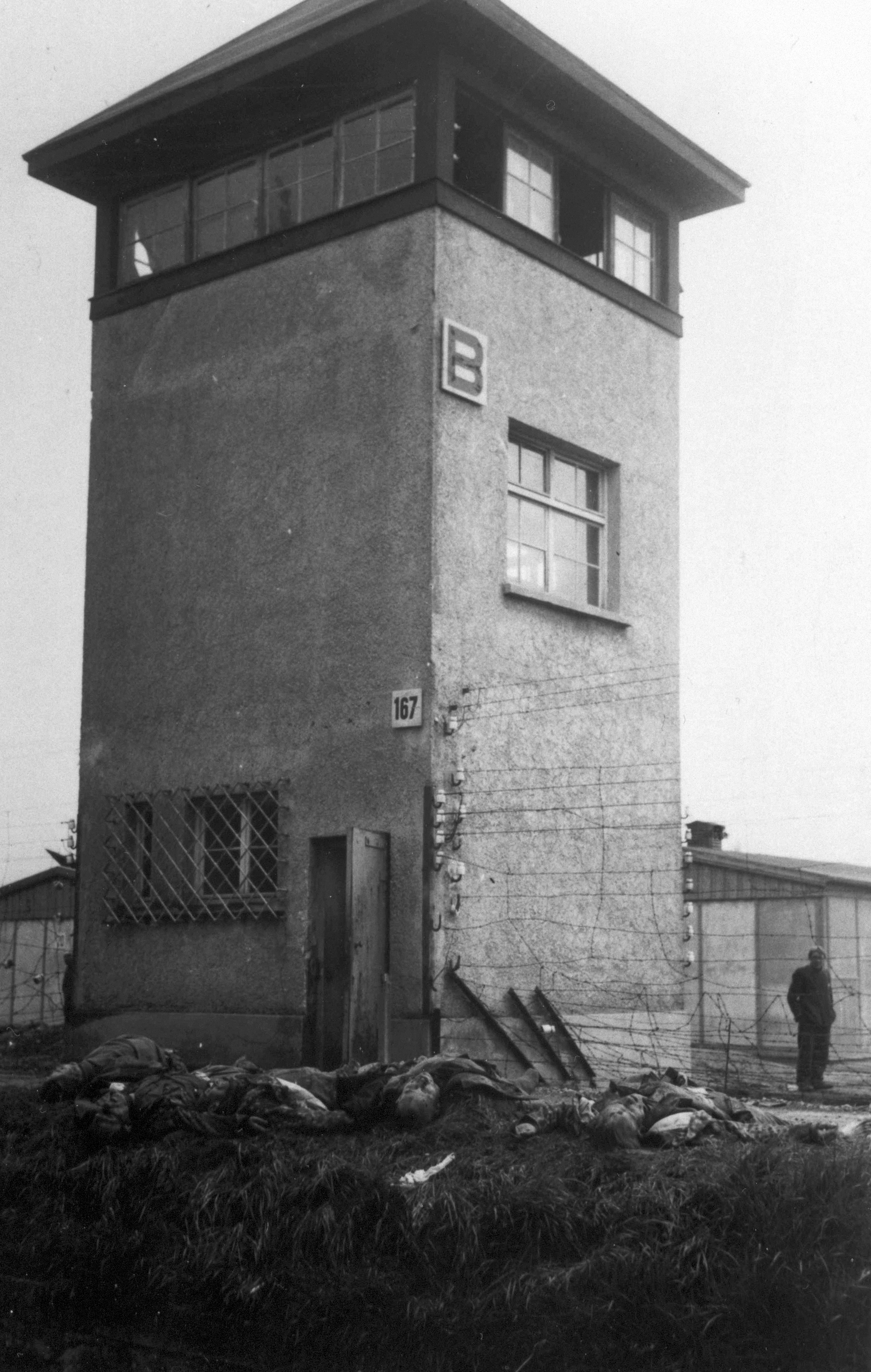
Dead SS Guards lying at the foot of KZ Dachau Watchtower "B"

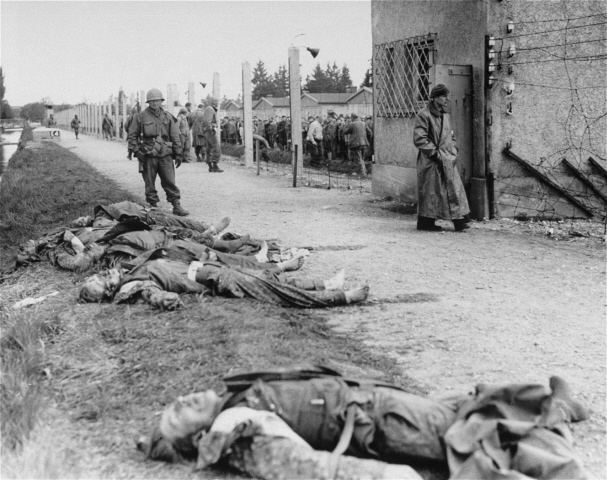
Bodies of SS personnel lying at the base of the tower from which U.S. soldiers had initially come under attack by a German machine gun

=== Sparks account ===
Lt. Col. Sparks, a battalion commander of the 157th Infantry Regiment, 45th Infantry Division wrote about the incident. Sparks watched as about 50 German prisoners captured by the 157th Infantry Regiment were confined in an area that had been used for storing coal. The area was partially enclosed by an L-shaped masonry wall about 8 ft (2.4 m) high and next to a hospital. The German POWs were watched over by a machine gun team from Company I. He left those men behind to head towards the center of the camp where there were SS who had not yet surrendered; he had only gone a short distance when he heard a soldier yell, "They're trying to get away!" and then machine-gun fire coming from the area he had just left. He ran back and kicked a 19-year-old soldier nicknamed "Birdeye" who was manning the machine gun and who had killed about 12 of the prisoners and wounded several more. The gunner, who was crying hysterically, said that the prisoners had tried to escape. Sparks said that he doubted the story; Sparks placed an NCO on the gun before resuming his journey towards the center of the camp. Sparks further stated:

It was the foregoing incident which has given rise to wild claims in various publications that most or all of the German prisoners captured at Dachau were executed. Nothing could be further from the truth. The total number of German guards killed at Dachau during that day most certainly did not exceed fifty, with thirty probably being a more accurate figure. The regimental records for that date indicate that over a thousand German prisoners were brought to the regimental collecting point. Since my task force was leading the regimental attack, almost all the prisoners were taken by the task force, including several hundred from Dachau.

— Felix L. Sparks

=== Buechner account ===
In the U.S. military Investigation of Alleged Mistreatment of German Guards at Dachau conducted by Lt. Col. Joseph Whitaker, the account given by Howard Buechner (then a first lieutenant in the United States Army and medical officer with the 3rd Battalion, 157th Infantry) to Whitaker on May 5, 1945, did not contradict the Sparks account. Buechner's sworn testimony was that around 16:00 he arrived in the yard where the German soldiers had been shot, and that he "saw 15 or 16 dead and wounded German soldiers lying along the wall". He noted that some of the wounded soldiers were still moving, but he did not examine any of them. He answered "Yes, sir" when asked if he was the surgeon of the 3rd Battalion, 157th Infantry, at that time, and did not know if any medical attention was called for the wounded.

According to Buechner's 1986 book, Dachau: The Hour of the Avenger: An Eyewitness Account, U.S. forces killed 520 German soldiers, including 346 killed on the orders of 1st Lt. Jack Bushyhead, in an alleged mass execution in the coal yard several hours after the first hospital shooting. Buechner did not witness the alleged incident, and his sworn testimony was that he "saw 15 or 16 dead and wounded German soldiers lying along the wall." His sworn testimony in the official investigation report also did not include any mention of a second shooting. David L. Israel disputed this account in his book The Day the Thunderbird Cried:

Buechner's inaccuracies and arbitrary use of figures in citing the untrue story about the total liquidation of all SS troops found in Dachau was eagerly accepted by Revisionist organizations and exploited to meet their own distorted stories of Dachau.

— David L. Israel

Jürgen Zarusky also concluded that Buechner's claims were incorrect.

=== Other accounts ===
Abram Sachar reported, "Some of the Nazis were rounded up and summarily executed along with the guard dogs."

According to Jürgen Zarusky (originally published in a 1997 article in Dachauer Hefte), 16 SS men were shot in the coal yard (one more killed by a camp inmate), 17 at Tower B, and perhaps a few more killed by U.S. soldiers in the incident. Anywhere from as few as 25 or more than 50 were killed by inmates. Zarusky's research makes use of the detailed interrogation records contained in Whitaker's official May 1945 investigation report, which became accessible in 1992, as well as a collection of documents compiled by General Henning Linden's son.

The Dachau liberation reprisals were documented among others by U.S. Army photographers Paul Averitt, George Gaberlavage, Sidney Rachlin and Ed Royce, Sr.

== Killings by the inmates ==
Walenty Lenarczyk, a prisoner at Dachau, stated that following the camp's liberation "prisoners swarmed over the wire and grabbed the Americans and lifted them to their shoulders... other prisoners caught the SS men... The first SS man elbowed one or two prisoners out of his way, but the courage of the prisoners mounted, they knocked them down and nobody could see whether they were stomped or what, but they were killed." Elsewhere in the camp SS men, Kapos and informers were beaten badly with fists, sticks and shovels. There was at least one incident where US soldiers looked away as two prisoners beat a German guard to death with a shovel, and Lt. Bill Walsh witnessed one such beating. Another soldier witnessed an inmate stomping on an SS trooper's face until "there wasn't much left." When the soldier said to him, "You've got a lot of hate in your heart," he simply nodded.

An American chaplain was told by three young Jewish men, who had left the camp during liberation, that they had beaten to death one of the most sadistic SS guards when they discovered him hiding in a barn, dressed as a peasant.

== United States Army investigation ==
Lt. Col. Joseph Whitaker, the Seventh Army's Assistant Inspector General, was ordered to investigate after witnesses came forward testifying about the killings. He issued a report on June 8, 1945, called the Investigation of Alleged Mistreatment of German Guards at Dachau, also known as The I.G. Report. In 1991, an archived copy was found in the National Archives in Washington, D.C., and made public.

Whitaker reported that close to the back entrance to the camp, Lt. William P. Walsh, commander of Company "I", 157th Infantry, shot four German soldiers in a boxcar who had surrendered to him. Pvt. Albert C. Pruitt then climbed into the boxcar and performed a coup de grâce on the wounded men.

After he had entered the camp, Walsh, along with Lt. Jack Bushyhead, the executive officer of Company "I", organized the segregation of POWs into those who were members of the Wehrmacht and those who were in the SS. The SS were marched into a separate enclosure and shot by members of "I" Company with several different types of weapons.

The investigation resulted in the U.S. military considering courts-martial against those involved, including battalion commander Lt. Col. Felix Sparks, while Lt. Howard Buechner was cited in the report for dereliction of duty for not giving medical aid to the wounded SS men in the coal yard. However, Gen. George S. Patton, recently appointed military governor of Bavaria, chose to dismiss the charges. Therefore, the witnesses to the killings were never cross-examined in court.

Col. Charles L. Decker, an acting deputy judge advocate, concluded in late 1945 that while the reprisals were a war crime, there were extenuating circumstances that warranted the case being dropped without any charges:

It appears that there was a violation of the letter of international law in that the SS guards seem to have been shot without trial. But in the light of the conditions which greeted the eyes of the first combat troops to reach Dachau, it is not believed that justice or equity demand that the difficult and perhaps impossible task of fixing individual responsibility now be undertaken.

== See also ==
- List of massacres in Germany
