= Felix L. Sparks =

American soldier and judge (1917–2007)

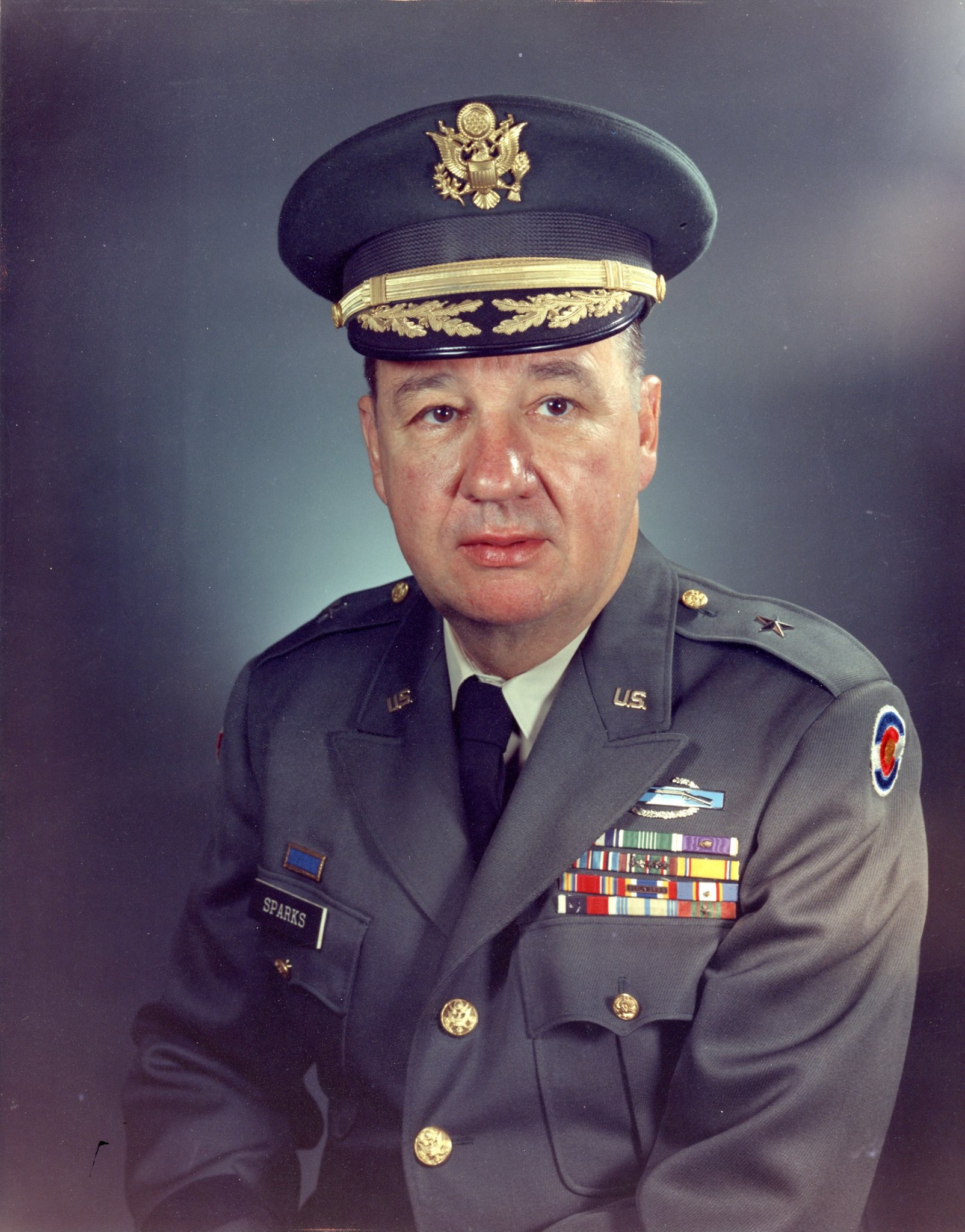
- Sparks as a Colorado National Guard brigadier general, c. 1970

Associate Justice of the Colorado Supreme Court
- In office May 22, 1956 – December 15, 1956
- Preceded by: John R. Clark
- Succeeded by: Frank H. Hall

District Attorney of Colorado's 7th Judicial District
- In office 1949–1953
- Preceded by: A. Allen Brown
- Succeeded by: Theodore L. Brooks

Personal details
- Born: August 2, 1917 San Antonio, Texas, U.S.
- Died: September 25, 2007 (aged 90) Lakewood, Colorado, U.S.
- Resting place: Crown Hill Cemetery, Wheat Ridge, Colorado, U.S.
- Party: Democratic
- Spouse: Mary Blair (m. 1941)
- Children: 4
- Education: University of Colorado Law School
- Occupation: Director, Colorado Water Conservation Board
- Profession: Attorney

Military service
- Allegiance: United States
- Branch/service: United States Army
- Years of service: 1936–1938 (Army); 1939–1940 (Reserve); 1941–1945 (Army); 1946–1977 (National Guard)
- Rank: Brigadier General
- Unit: United States Army; United States Army Reserve; Colorado Army National Guard
- Commands: Company E, 2nd Battalion, 157th Infantry Regiment; 3rd Battalion, 157th Infantry Regiment; 1st Battalion, 157th Regimental Combat Team; 169th Field Artillery Group; Colorado Army National Guard
- Battles/wars: World War II; Italian campaign; Operation Husky; Battle of Anzio; Operation Dragoon; Battle of the Bulge; Operation Nordwind; Western Allied invasion of Germany; Battle of Aschaffenburg; Berlin Crisis of 1961
- Awards: Silver Star (2); Purple Heart (2); Croix de Guerre (France)

Felix Laurence Sparks (August 2, 1917 – September 25, 2007) was an American attorney, government official, and military officer from Colorado. A veteran of World War II, he attained the rank of brigadier general in the Colorado Army National Guard and received the Silver Star and the Purple Heart. Sparks also served as District Attorney of Colorado's 7th Judicial District, an Associate Justice of the Colorado Supreme Court, and the longtime director of the Colorado Water Conservation Board.

A native of San Antonio, Sparks was raised and educated in Arizona and served as an enlisted soldier in the United States Army from 1936 to 1938. He then attended the University of Arizona, where he maintained his military interest by taking part in the Reserve Officers' Training Corps and several Citizens' Military Training Camps while also serving in the Army Reserve. In 1939, he was called to active duty for World War II, and in 1940 he received his commission as a second lieutenant. Assigned to the 45th Infantry Division, Sparks served with the division's 157th Infantry Regiment throughout the war, from its arrival in North Africa through combat in Sicily, Italy, France, and Germany. Near the end of the war, Sparks was commander of the 157th Infantry's 3rd Battalion, which he led during its participation in the liberation of the Dachau concentration camp. For his wartime service, Sparks was twice awarded both the Silver Star and the Purple Heart, as well as the French Croix de Guerre.

After the war, Sparks graduated from the University of Colorado Law School, was admitted to the bar, and practiced in Delta, Colorado. A leader of the local Democratic Party, Sparks served a term as District Attorney of Colorado's 7th Judicial District (1949–1953), and briefly filled a vacancy as an Associate Justice of the Colorado Supreme Court (1956). In 1957, Sparks was appointed attorney for the Colorado Water Conservation Board. In 1958, he became the board's director, and he served in this position until retiring in 1979.

In addition to pursuing careers in law and government, Sparks continued to serve in the military. Assigned as executive officer of the 157th Regimental Combat Team (RCT), a unit of the Colorado Army National Guard, Sparks subsequently commanded the RCT's 1st Battalion. He commanded the 169th Field Artillery Group as a colonel in the late 1950s and early 1960s, including recall to active duty for several months during the Berlin Crisis of 1961. Sparks was promoted to brigadier general in 1968 and assigned as the Colorado National Guard's assistant adjutant general for army and commander of the Colorado Army National Guard. Sparks served in the National Guard until reaching the mandatory retirement age in 1977.

Sparks died in Lakewood, Colorado, on September 25, 2007. He was buried at Crown Hill Cemetery in Wheat Ridge, Colorado.

== Early life ==
Felix L. "Larry" Sparks was born in San Antonio, Texas, on August 2, 1917, the oldest of five children born to Felix Franklin Sparks and Martha Estelle (Ray) Sparks. When he was four, his family moved to Miami, Arizona, where his father worked in a copper mine. Sparks was raised and educated in Arizona, and in 1935, he took part in one of the Citizens' Military Training Camps (C.M.T.C.) operated by the United States Army, which offered young men the opportunity to obtain military training and possibly earn a commission in the National Guard or Army Reserve.

In March 1936 he joined the United States Army. Assigned to a coast artillery regiment, he served in Hawaii for two years. After his March 1938 discharge, Sparks returned to Arizona, where he attended the University of Arizona. In 1939, he participated in another C.M.T.C., at which he won several awards and was recommended for a commission. While attending college, Sparks also participated in the Reserve Officers' Training Corps.

== World War II ==
Sparks served in the Army Reserve from 1939 to 1940, and was commissioned as a second lieutenant of Infantry in January 1940. He was called to active duty in February 1941 and assigned to the 45th Infantry Division. Sparks took part in the Italian campaign, Southern France campaign, and Central European campaign. He was promoted to first lieutenant in February 1942, captain in October 1942, major in August 1944, and lieutenant colonel in November 1944.

During the war, Sparks's assignments included adjutant of 2nd Battalion, 157th Infantry Regiment and commander of the battalion's Company E. As a major and lieutenant colonel, he commanded the 45th Division's 3rd Battalion, 157th Infantry Regiment during 1944 and 1945.

== Post-World War II ==
=== District attorney ===
After the war, Sparks attended the University of Colorado Law School, graduating in 1948. After receiving his LL.B. degree, Sparks was admitted to the bar and began a practice in Delta, Colorado. Sparks was also active in civic and veterans organizations, including the Lions, Elks, Veterans of Foreign Wars, and American Legion. In 1948, he was the successful Democratic candidate for District Attorney of the 7th Judicial District, and he served one term, 1949 to 1953. Sparks also served as chairman of the Democratic Party in Delta County.

Following his term as district attorney, Sparks resumed practicing law in Delta. In addition, he served as county attorney for Delta County and town attorney for the town of Hotchkiss. Sparks was a leader of the Delta County bar, and was a member of the Phi Delta Phi fraternity, American Bar Association, and Colorado Bar Association.

=== Colorado Water Conservation Board ===
In May 1956, Governor Edwin C. Johnson appointed Sparks to fill a vacancy as an Associate Justice of the Colorado Supreme Court. He served until November 1956 and was an unsuccessful candidate for a full term. In January 1957, Sparks was appointed attorney for the Colorado Water Conservation Board. In June 1958, Sparks was appointed as the board's director. Sparks served as the board's director until retiring in April 1979. After his retirement, Sparks was a consultant on issues of water resource management and served as a member of the Upper Colorado River Commission.

=== Continued military career ===
In addition to his career in politics and government, Sparks remained in the military after World War II. In 1946, he was appointed as executive officer the Colorado Army National Guard's 157th Regimental Combat Team (RCT) with the rank of lieutenant colonel. As reorganized units were assigned to the RCT, Sparks was assigned to command of its 1st Battalion. In May 1950, Sparks completed the course at the United States Army Command and General Staff College at Fort Leavenworth, Kansas.

After completing his tour as commander of 1st Battalion, Sparks served for several years on the staff at the Colorado National Guard's state headquarters. In August 1959 he was assigned to command the 169th Field Artillery Group. Sparks was a colonel in October 1961 when his command was called to active duty as part of the U.S. response to the Berlin Crisis of 1961. Sparks served on active duty at Fort Sill, Oklahoma until August 1962, then returned to his position with the state water conservation board.

In August 1968, Sparks completed the updated Command and General Staff College course at Fort Leavenworth. He was then promoted to brigadier general and assigned as Colorado's assistant adjutant general for army and commander of the Colorado Army National Guard. Sparks held this position until retiring upon reaching the mandatory retirement age of 60 in 1977.

== Awards ==
Sparks was a recipient of two awards of the Silver Star for heroism, as well as two awards of the Purple Heart. In addition, Sparks received the Croix de Guerre from the government of France. He received the Silver Star for heroism during combat in Italy in February 1944 while he was commander of Company E, 2nd Battalion, 157th Infantry. The citation for his first Silver Star read:

While Capt. Sparks' Infantry company was subjected to a series of enemy attacks near Carroceto, Italy, on February 16, he repeatedly exposed himself in order to advise his officers and men of the situation. During one attack two Mark IV tanks reached a point within 25 yards of his command post and fired on the position until repelled by bazooka and artillery fire. He remained at his post under artillery, machinegun and mortar fire, controlling his men and relaying valuable information to his battalion headquarters. When orders came to move the company, he successfully disengaged the enemy and organized a new defensive position, preventing a break-through.

== Dachau liberation ==
In September 1956, news of a planned reunion of 3rd Battalion, 157th Infantry Regiment scheduled for Denver in October included details of Sparks's role in the liberation of the Dachau concentration camp.

On April 29, 1945, units of 3rd Battalion, 157th Infantry Regiment, commanded by Sparks, were ordered to secure the Dachau camp; he led his troops as they entered the camp over a side wall. At about the same time, Brigadier General Henning Linden led soldiers of the 222nd Infantry Regiment of the 42nd (Rainbow) Infantry Division to accept the formal surrender of the camp from German Lieutenant Heinrich Wicker. Linden was traveling with Marguerite Higgins and other reporters, and as a result, Linden's detachment generated international headlines by accepting the surrender of the camp. More than 30,000 Jews and political prisoners were freed. Since 1945, adherents of the 42nd and 45th Division versions of events have argued over which unit was the first to liberate Dachau.

== Death and burial ==
Sparks died of pneumonia at St. Anthony Central Hospital in Denver, Colorado, on September 25, 2007. He was buried at Crown Hill Cemetery in Wheat Ridge, Colorado.

== Family ==
In 1941, Sparks married Mary Blair. They were the parents of four children.

== Legacy ==
Sparks' wartime experiences were the subject of a 2020 Netflix miniseries, The Liberator. Sparks's role in the Dachau liberation is also the subject of Alex Kershaw's book The Liberator, upon which the miniseries is based. In 2008, the United States Post Office at 10799 West Alameda Avenue in Lakewood, Colorado was named in Sparks' honor.

== See also ==
- Dachau liberation reprisals

== Additional reading ==
- Beuchner, Emajean Jordan (1991). Sparks. Metairie, LA: Thunderbird Press, Inc.
