= Evelyn Tucker =

American secretary and stenographer

- Born: Evelyn Tucker; August 15, 1906; Pensacola, Florida, U.S.
- Died: August 17, 1996 (aged 90); Santa Fe, New Mexico, U.S.
- Other names: Nettie Evelyn Tucker, Eve Tucker
- Occupations: Secretary/stenographer, International Military Tribunal, Nuremberg, Germany (Hermann Göring's war crimes trial); Investigator, Monuments, Fine Arts, and Archives program
- Parent(s): Joseph Wyatt Tucker and Nettie Elizabeth Knowles

Evelyn Tucker (August 15, 1906 – August 17, 1996) was one of a handful of women who were employed as "Monuments Men" after World War II. According to Bryce McWhinnie, a researcher with the Monuments Men Foundation, several "unsung female American MFA&A officers"—Rose Valland, Capt. Edith A. Standen, Evelyn Tucker, and Capt. Mary J. Regan, "put their personal interests in jeopardy in order to protect priceless art." All under the age of 40 when they entered their respective service positions, "each of these women left her own mark on postwar cultural heritage restitution policy."

== Formative years ==
Born on August 15, 1906, in Pensacola, Escambia County, Florida, Evelyn Tucker was a daughter of Alabama natives Joseph Wyatt Tucker (1873–1910) and Nettie Elizabeth (Knowles) Tucker (1882–1909).

She and her brother, Alton Wyatt (1904–1991), and sister, Vera (1908–1976), were reared in Pensacola. Before the first decade of the new century could pass, however, they were orphaned. On August 19, 1909, their mother died at the age of 27.

They then continued to reside in Escambia County with their widowed father, a brickyard superintendent. By May 1910, they were still living with their father in Escambia County, according to federal census records. Also residing at the home were their 52-year-old paternal grandmother, Nancy Jane (Ward) Tucker (1853–1913), and their paternal aunts, Virgie (1889–1979) and Bertha (1892–1971) Tucker.

Just a few months later, however, Evelyn Tucker's father was also gone, having died at the age of 36 on August 29, 1910. Their paternal grandmother, Nancy Tucker, then also died three years later.

By 1920, federal census takers had confirmed the whereabouts of Evelyn Tucker and her siblings. All three were residing at the Florida Baptist Orphanage in Arcadia, DeSoto County, Florida. Also known as the Florida Baptist Children's Home, the facility sheltered orphans "until they reached 18 years of age or were adopted into a Christian home," according to Historic Markers Across Florida. That same year, their paternal aunts, Virgie and Bertha Tucker, who had resided at their home in 1910, were two single women operating a boarding house in Pine Barren, Escambia County.

Before the decade was over, both of Evelyn Tucker's siblings had married. Her brother, Alton Wyatt Tucker, wed Elaine Peterson in Cache County, Utah on October 1, 1928, while her sister, Vera Jean Tucker, wed Donald R. Gettinger of Arcadia, Florida, on June 18, 1929, in DeSoto County, Florida.

Meanwhile, Evelyn Tucker was pursuing art studies at the University of Miami. In 1930, she was documented as residing in Miami, where she was employed as a stenographer for Dade County's tax office. She then secured an "administrative position with a secret division of Pan American World Airways devoted to installing radar systems on air bases around the world," according to the Monuments Men Foundation website.

== World War II and the Nuremberg Trials ==
During World War II, Evelyn Tucker was inducted into the Women's Army Auxiliary Corps (WAAC) on April 30, 1943. Per the Tuesday, March 2, 1943, edition of The Miami News, she completed her entrance examination at a local recruiting office, and "was sworn into the Women's Army Auxiliary corps Sunday after making the highest score, 141, in the mental alertness test of any applicant in this area."

Attached to WAAC's weather department, she was then later assigned to a counterintelligence unit with the U.S. Army Air Corps.

Honorably discharged from military service near the end of the war, she then secured employment as a secretary and stenographer with the International Military Tribunal in Nuremberg, Germany. During this time, she provided administrative assistance for the tribunal's prosecution of Hermann Göring.

== Monuments men tenure ==
Next assigned to the Monuments, Fine Arts, and Archives (MFAA) program as an administrative assistant in February 1946, she was quickly promoted to a position as Fine Arts Officer in March of that same year, and assigned to the Reparation, Deliveries and Restitution (RD&R) Branch of the U.S. Allied Command, Austria (USACA) in Salzburg—a job she performed only until July due to a reorganization of the MFAA. Awarded a position as Fine Arts Officer again in October 1947, she continued in that role until that job was eliminated in February 1949.

According to the Monuments Men Foundation website, while in Austria, "Tucker maintained offices in Vienna, Salzburg, and Linz," keeping "inventory records of the branch's art objects," and "investigat[ing] restitution claims within the jurisdiction of the U.S. Forces, Austria (USFA), including the collections of the national museums in Warsaw and Cracow, and the Lipizzaner Horses."

Described by McWhinnie as "the most outspoken female voice in post-World War II cultural history restoration," she "reported the missteps and mismanagement of her superiors and actively investigated the hushed subject of looting by American officers." Her Final Status Report to the director of the USACA Section, Headquarters, United States Forces in Austria on February 16, 1949, detailed the significant number of art objects which had been relocated, against MFAA policy, to "officers' clubs and the personal offices of generals" and, contained this noteworthy commentary:

It is a matter of regret to me that USACA did not attach enough importance to my handling of this delicate and explosive work, about which only I am familiar, to allow me to bring it to a successful conclusion.

== Post-war life ==
Following her services as a member of the MFAA, Tucker returned home to Florida, where she secured a desk job as a sergeant with the police department. During the 1950s, she operated the Eve Tucker Gallery in Miami Beach.

In 1965, Tucker relocated to Santa Fe, New Mexico, where she continued to reside for the remainder of her life. Employed as a VISTA volunteer, she also worked for the New Mexico Office of Health and Social Services as a quality control specialist on a Navajo reservation.

== Death and interment ==
Nettie Evelyn Tucker died at the age of 90 in Santa Fe, New Mexico on August 17, 1996. Her remains were subsequently returned to Florida. Following graveside services, she was interred at St. John's Cemetery in Pensacola on September 12.

== Legacy ==
Nearly a half century after Tucker's Monuments Men tenure and two years after her death, a letter that she had written in January 1949 to U.S. State Department cultural affairs officer Ardelia Ripley Hall was brought to light by members of a presidential commission which was tasked with determining what had happened to valuables that had been stolen from Jewish Holocaust victims by Hermann Göring and other Nazi officials during World War II and were still missing. That letter by Tucker, which documented the post-World War II looting by U.S. Army officers of multiple items from former Nazi strongholds during the period of the MFAA's reorganization when Tucker's position had briefly been eliminated (July 1946–October 1947), was found in 1998 by members of that commission while searching through a collection of Hall's documents housed at the U.S. National Archives, and has since been used by attorneys and other investigators in locating and returning those missing valuables to (or obtaining other forms of restitution for), surviving family members of Holocaust victims, including by the attorneys who successfully negotiated a settlement in 2005 in the Hungarian Gold Train case which was brought against the U.S. government and heard in the U.S. District Court for the Southern District of Florida.

== External resources ==
- "Central Registry of Information on Looted Cultural Property 1933-1945". London, United Kingdom: Central Registry of Information.
- "Confiscation of Jewish Property in Europe, 1933–1945: New Sources and Perspectives" (audio of March 22, 2001, symposium). Washington, D.C.: United States Holocaust Memorial Museum.
- "Looted Art" (historical overview). Washington, D.C.: United States Holocaust Memorial Museum.
- Monuments Men Foundation for the Preservation of Art, Dallas, Texas.
