= Stanley Moore =

Stanley or Stan Moore may refer to:

- Stanley Moore (cricketer) (1886–1948), Australian cricketer
- Stanley Moore (politician) (fl. 1910s–1920s), American politician
- Stanley Moore (professor) (1914–1997), American professor
- Stanley Moore (water polo), Irish Olympic water polo player
- Stan Moore (director) (born 1956), American film director, screenwriter, and producer
- Stan Moore (ice hockey), American ice hockey player and coach
