= Dachau Uprising =

1945 anti-government uprising in Dachau

- Part of European theatre of World War II
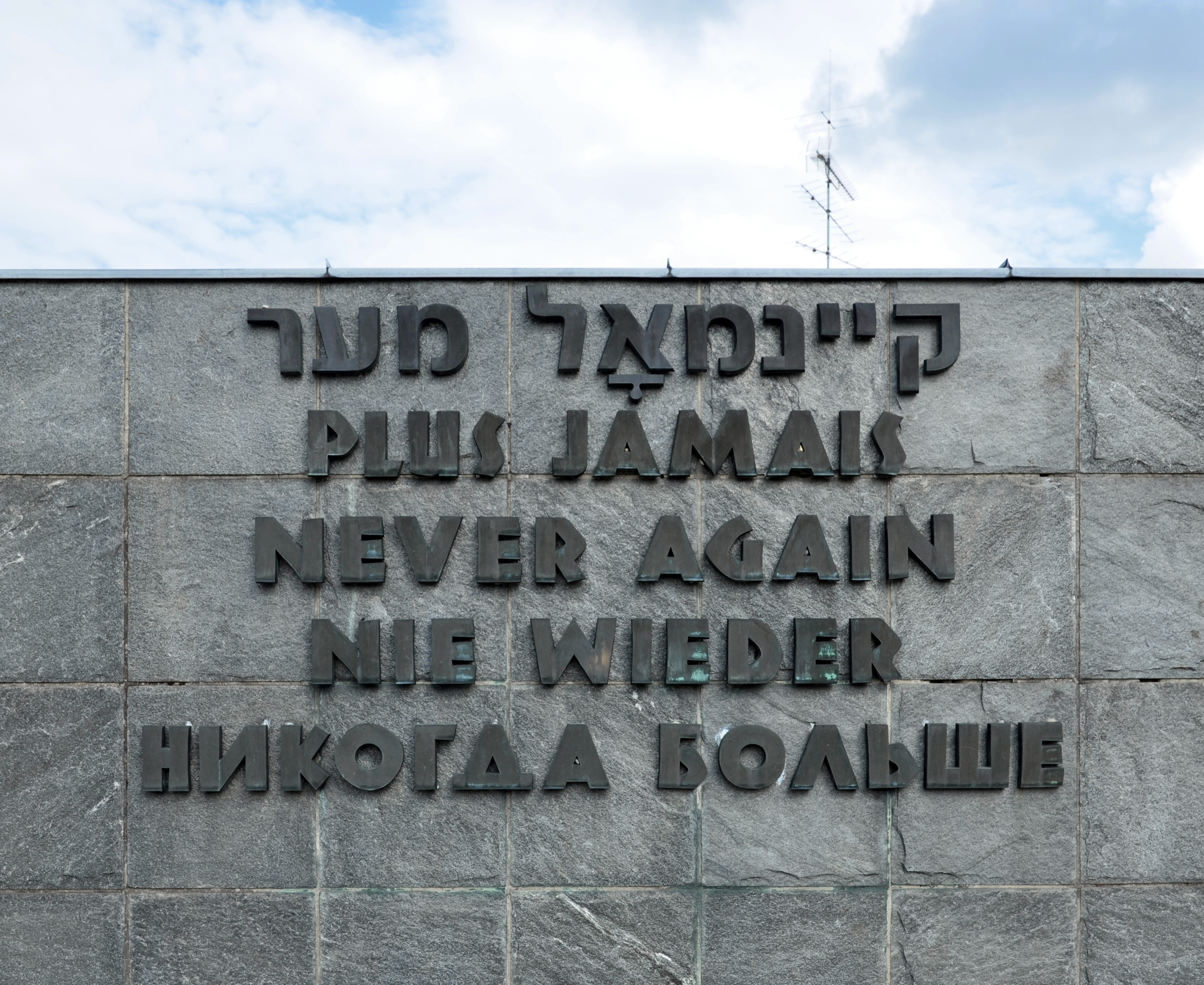
- Dachau concentration camp memorial
Date	April 28th, 1945- April 29th (American liberation)
Location	Dachau, Germany
Result	Revolt Failed: Dachau liberation reprisals after American liberation of the Dachau concentration camp a day after the revolt on April 29th, 1945

Belligerents
Schutzstaffel and Volkssturm units	Escaped Dachau Prisoners; Dachau citizens; Deserters

Commanders and leaders
Unknown	Georg Schmid; Walter Neff; Georg Scherer

Casualties and losses
~35–50 SS guards killed in post-liberation reprisals	Several deaths, including 7 citizens who were killed or executed; Damage to several buildings; 40 captured

The Dachau Uprising (German: Dachauer Aufstand) was a revolt of Dachau prisoners, citizens of Dachau and deserters on 28 April 1945, aimed at disempowering party officials willing to fight, as well as Schutzstaffel (SS) and Volkssturm units during the last stages of World War II. It also sought to end Nazi rule in the town, prevent the liquidation of the concentration camp and the murder of the surviving prisoners.

In late April 1945, as Allied forces approached, the SS began evacuating prisoners from the Dachau concentration camp to prevent their liberation. At least 10,000 inmates from the Dachau camp and its satellite camps were forced onto grueling death marches toward Tyrol. Thousands perished along the way due to exhaustion, starvation, and mistreatment.

== Revolt ==
In April 1945, an armed resistance group formed in Dachau, consisting of both local residents and former prisoners of the Dachau concentration camp. The group was led by Georg Scherer and Walter Neff, who had been released from the camp in 1941 and 1942, respectively. Another commander was Georg Schmid. the morning of April 28, 1945, the "Freedom Action Bavaria" called for resistance against the Nazi regime. In response, the Dachau group launched an uprising to end Nazi rule in the town and prevent the liquidation of the camp and the murder of the surviving prisoners. They managed to occupy the town hall, but by midday, units of the Waffen-SS entered the town and crushed the uprising. A day after American troops liberated Dachau.

== Aftermath ==
After the US troops liberated the concentration camp, they were shocked at how the Nazis treated the inmates. As an act of revenge, American troops and the freed prisoners killed several dozen SS guards.

On April 30, 1945, the Townsville Daily Bulletin reported:

"An entire battalion of Allied troops was needed to restrain the 32,000 prisoners liberated at Dachau, and prevent excesses, says Reuters correspondent at S.H.A.E.F. The discovery of 50 railway trucks loaded with bodies and gas chambers, torture rooms, whipping posts and crematoria strongly supports reports of atrocities which leaked out of the camp."
