= Hungarian Gold Train =

German-operated train during World War II

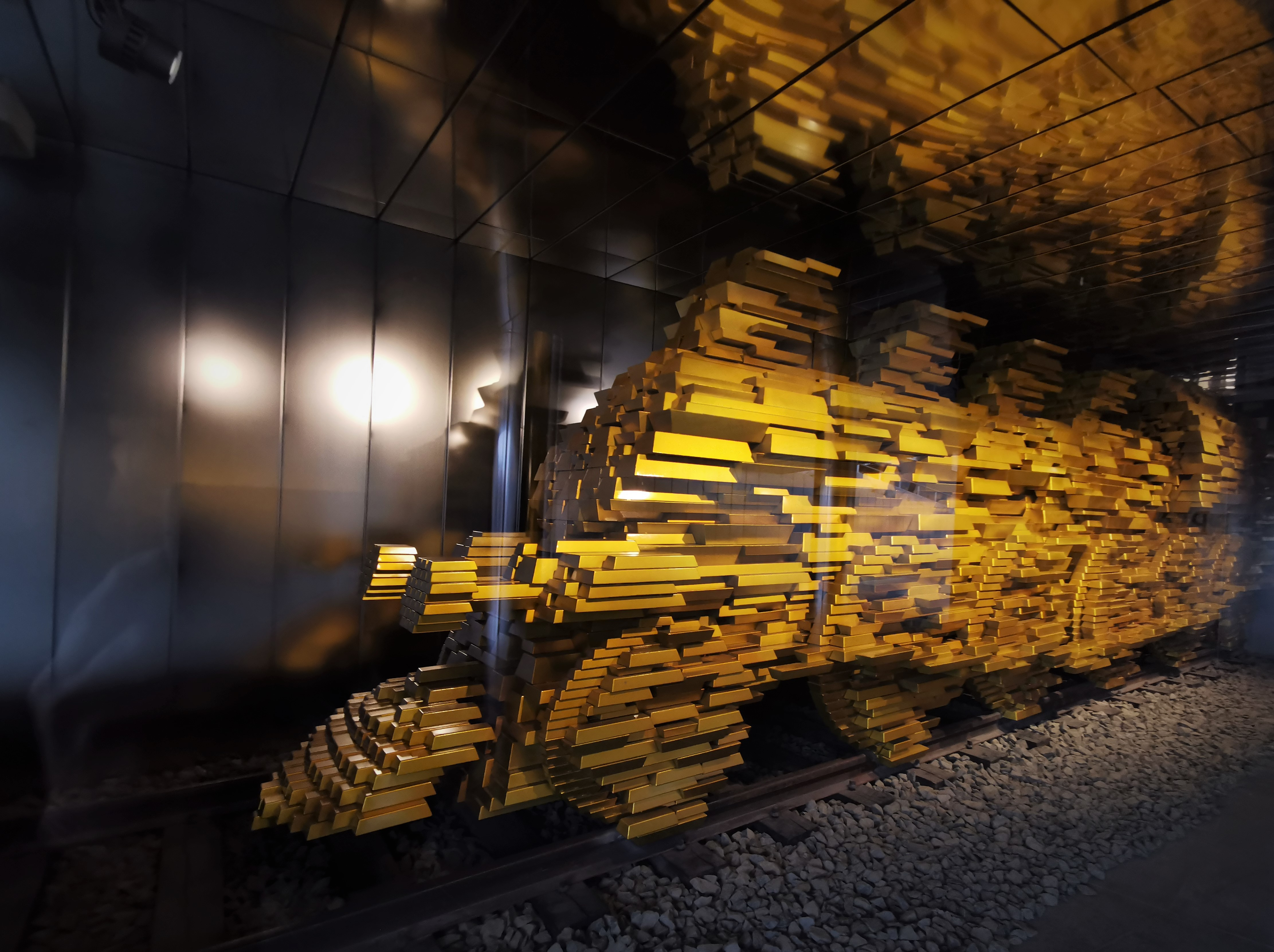
Statue representing the Gold Train at the Money Museum in Budapest, Hungary

The Hungarian Gold Train was a German-operated train during World War II that carried stolen valuables, mostly Hungarian Jews' property, from Hungary towards Berlin in 1945. After American forces seized and looted the train in Austria, almost none of the valuables were returned to Hungary, their rightful owners, or their surviving family members.

== History ==
=== Background ===
With the Soviet Army about 160 kilometres (100 mi) away from Hungary, on March 7, 1944, Adolf Hitler launched Operation Margarethe—the invasion of Hungary. The Arrow Cross Party – Hungary's fascist government, led by Ferenc Szálasi – collaborated with their German occupiers in forcing the estimated 800,000 Jewish citizens of Hungary to hand over all of their valuables to government officials. This included gems, gold jewelry, wedding rings, and anything else considered to be of high monetary value. The confiscated property was placed into individual bags and boxes which identified the owners, and receipts were issued. The majority of the Jews were shipped to concentration camps, particularly Auschwitz-Birkenau; most were murdered. The Hungarian authorities re-sorted all the confiscated valuables into content categories. By that time it was all but impossible to identify proper ownership of any of the valuables.

=== The "Gold Train" ===
Undated photo of a German freight train during World War II.

In late 1944, the Soviet Army was advancing on the Hungarian capital of Budapest. A government official appointed by the Schutzstaffel (SS), Árpád Toldi, concocted a plan to evacuate much of the Jewish loot out of Hungary. Toldi ordered large amounts of the valuables onto a 46-car freight train with 213 people on board that was to head for Nazi Germany via Austria:

- 24 cars to carry the confiscated and looted items
- 15 cars to carry Hungarian and Nazi Germany troops guarding the train, plus their supplies of ammunition, food & drink
- 7 cars to carry a designated group of coal miners, who were there to bury the items should need arise

According to various reports about the train, the contents included gold, gold jewelry, gems, diamonds, pearls, watches, about 200 paintings, Persian and Oriental rugs, silverware, chinaware, furniture, fine clothing, linens, porcelains, cameras, stamp-collections and currency (mostly US dollars and Swiss francs). As the train meandered through Hungary, it stopped at a few locations to collect other looted and confiscated items that had been stored elsewhere, including a stop close to Abaúj Castle. On reaching a considered safe location close to the Hungarian/Austrian border, Toldi halted the train for 92 days to carefully document what he catalogued as Hungarian Government property. Jewish organizations and the Hungarian government estimated the total value of the train's contents at $350 million in 1945 or almost $4 billion in 2007 adjusted for inflation. Other estimates of the contents' 1945 worth are from $50 million to $120 million or $570 million to $1.7 billion in 2007 adjusted for inflation.

In Spring 1945, the train started its journey west again. Toldi and his family left the train with a large amount of gold on 30 March 1945, as the train crossed into Austria - the Russian Army was only 16 km (10 mi) behind. Toldi's convoy tried to enter neutral Switzerland 10 days later, but were refused entry. Toldi then turned to SS officer Wilhelm Höttl, to whom he handed over 10% of his convoy's goods (4 cases of gold) in return for both German passports and Swiss visas for all of his family. Toldi and his family then successfully entered Switzerland, but he was detained in Austria later that year. After interrogation by Allied authorities, he was released and no trace of him has been found in official records thereafter.

After passing from Hungary directly into Austria, the train stopped occasionally to transfer amounts of the gold to trucks. The fate of the gold on those trucks remains unknown. The train eventually came to a halt in the town of Werfen, best known for the medieval Hohenwerfen Castle, on 16 May 1945, nine days after the surrender of Nazi Germany. It was seized by Allied troops, first by the French Army and then by the United States Army.

=== Fate of valuables ===
The official United States asset restitution policy agreed upon at the 1946 Final Act of Paris Reparation Conference and by the Five-Power Agreement for Non-Repatriable Victims of Germany was to sell ownerless property for the benefit of non-repatriable refugees. These agreements were the basis for the creation of the Preparatory Committee for the International Refugee Organization (IRO). The US had a different policy towards works of art. In accordance with long-standing international agreements, the US had a policy of restitution that "looted works of art and cultural material will be restituted to the governments of the countries from which they were taken." The US Army Counter Intelligence Corps (CIC) sent their officer Morton Himmler, who was stationed in Salzburg, to take charge of what they referred to as the Werfen Train. Himmler ordered the people on board to be immediately detained and separated from the train, although the US Army which was short of personnel allowed selected Hungarian troops to assist in unloading the train. Meanwhile, the Central Board of Jews in Hungary - an organization representing Jewish interests in Hungary, and under pressure from the occupying Soviet Army who were seeking war repatriations - and the new government of Hungary, were aware of the American seizure of the train and lobbied extensively, and sometimes passionately, for the return of all the contents of the train to Hungary where they could be sorted out in an effort to return them to their rightful owners or their family members. The US Government continually ignored the Hungarian pleas.

The US Army transferred the majority of the assets to a Military Government Warehouse in Salzburg. The paintings, however, were stored in the Salzburg Residenz. As ownership of the valuables was impossible to ascertain, the official US position, as stipulated by United States Army Chief of Staff George C. Marshall, was that the belongings were to be given to refugee aid organizations in accordance with international restitution agreements. The majority of the remaining assets from the train was either sold through Army exchange stores in Europe in 1946 or auctioned off in New York City in 1948, with the proceeds going to the IRO. According to The New York Times the auction receipts totaled $152,850.61, or approximately $1.3 million in 2007 adjusted for inflation. Items of clothing allocated for Army exchange store sales that were considered of lesser value were turned over to a Division chaplain for distribution "to needy DPs" (displaced persons). Some of the property from the train ended up in the possession of high-ranking US Army officers who were stationed in Central Europe to oversee post-war and Marshall Plan reconstruction efforts. By requisition order of Major General Harry J. Collins, Commander of the 42nd Infantry Division (the famed "Rainbow" Division), many of the items were used to furnish his home. Other items furnished the homes and offices of other US military officers including Brigadier General Henning Linden and General Edgar E. Hume. The property included chinaware, silverware, glassware, rugs, and table and bed linen. The ultimate fate of approximately 200 paintings seized from the train is unknown. As they were deemed "cultural assets" under official US restitution policy, they should have been returned to their country of origin. That country should have been Hungary, but as of 1953 the paintings were in the possession of the Austrian government; their current whereabouts is unknown.

=== Developments since 1998 ===
The United States government kept most of the details of the Hungarian Gold Train secret from the public until 1998 when US President Bill Clinton created the Presidential Advisory Commission on Holocaust Assets in the United States. A report prepared by the committee, published in October 1999, detailed the handling of the train's assets by the United States and cited a multitude of "shortcomings" of the US restitution efforts in Austria that eventually led to the property from the Hungarian Gold Train being so readily dispersed by United States officials. It concluded that the application of several policies regarding many assets on the train ensured that they were never returned to their rightful owners.

In 2001, Hungarian Holocaust survivors filed a lawsuit in a Florida district court against the United States government for the government's mishandling of the assets on the Hungarian Gold Train. The survivors amended their complaint and asserted that the U.S. government failed to maintain its promise regarding the assets and reclassified the property as "stolen enemy property" thus allowing the sale of items at auctions in 1948. The proceeds were allegedly used to pay for international refugee settlement programs and served as a cover-up for officials who looted the assets. The case was settled as President George W. Bush intended to appease Jewish voters in Florida to secure their votes for the upcoming elections in 2004. David Mermelstein was the only survivor present at the mediation. In 2005, the government reached a settlement worth $25.5 million. The money was allocated for distribution to various Jewish social service agencies for the benefit of Holocaust survivors. Among the items of evidence submitted by attorneys who represented the survivors was a January 1949 letter written by Evelyn Tucker, a fine arts officer serving with the United States' Monuments, Fine Arts, and Archives (MFAA) program who had been assigned to the Reparation, Deliveries and Restitution (RD&R) Branch of the U.S. Allied Command, Austria (USACA). Sent to U.S. State Department cultural affairs officer Ardelia Ripley Hall, Tucker's letter documented the post-World War II looting by U.S. Army officers of multiple items from former Nazi strongholds, including items from the gold train.

Funds from the settlement are still being distributed. On June 3, 2014, a report was filed with the federal court detailing that between July 1, 2012 and June 30, 2013, $464,553.56 had been distributed to 12 Jewish social service organizations in Australia, Canada, Hungary, Israel, Sweden and the United States.

== See also ==
- Gold laundering
- Nazi gold train
