= Heinrich Wicker =

Officer at Dachau (1921–1945)

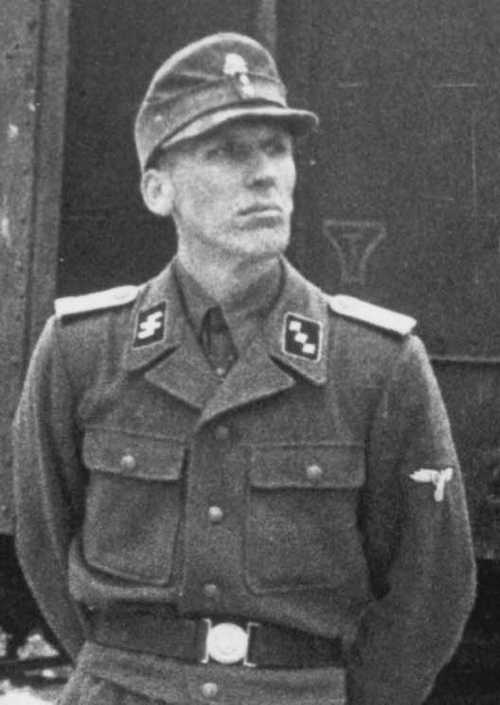
- Wicker after the liberation of Dachau
- Born: 30 June 1921; Baden-Württemberg, Weimar Republic
- Died: 29 April 1945 (aged 23) Dachau concentration camp, Bavaria, Allied-occupied Germany
- Cause of death: Execution by shooting
- Allegiance: Nazi Germany
- Branch: Waffen-SS
- Service years: 1937–1945
- Rank: SS-Untersturmführer
- Commands: Dachau concentration camp
- Conflicts: World War II

Heinrich Wicker (30 June 1921 – 29 April 1945) was a German SS-Untersturmführer. He was the last commandant of the Dachau concentration camp. In the final weeks of the war, Wicker was responsible for leading a death march in which nearly 200 prisoners died. He was later summarily executed by American soldiers during the Dachau liberation reprisals.

== Career ==
On 9 September 1933, at the age of 12, Wicker became a member of the Hitler Youth. On 25 June 1937, shortly before his 16th birthday, he joined the SS-Totenkopfverbände (SS No. 320.280). From 1 November 1938 he was stationed in Dachau as a Sturmmann in the SS Totenkopf Infantry Regiment 1. During the war, Wicker fought in an SS Panzer unit. In May and June 1940, he took part in the German invasions of the Netherlands, Belgium, and France. In June 1941, Wicker was involved in Operation Barbarossa. In February 1942, he was seriously wounded in the Battle of Demyansk, after which he was evacuated.

After recovering, Wicker completed courses for SS leadership applicants at the SS-Junker Schools in Bad Tölz from August to November 1943. In November 1943, Wicker, now a Oberscharführer, was transferred to Amtsgruppe D of the SS Main Economic and Administrative Office. On 30 January 1943 Wicker was promoted to Untersturmführer. On 1 June 1944 he was transferred to the Natzweiler-Struthof concentration camp and took over leadership of the Bruttig-Treis concentration camp, a subcamp of Natzweiler-Struthof. Wicker was feared by prisoners due to his brutality. In December 1944, he became the commandant of the Natzweiler Mannheim-Sandhofen subcamp. One of his first official acts there was the execution of the Warsaw prisoner Marian Krainski on 3 January 1945, for alleged factory sabotage in the schoolyard of the Friedrich School, to which he had invited five representatives of Daimler Benz.

Towards the end of the war, Wicker was the leader of several death marches. The most notable one was the Hessenthal death march, during which at least 170 concentration camp prisoners were murdered or died of exhaustion. This death march led to the Munich-Allach concentration camp. On 28 April 1945 Wicker became the final commandant of Dachau, after commandant Eduard Weiter fled. On 29 April 1945, Wicker surrendered the camp to General Henning Linden of the 42nd Infantry Division (United States) of the 7th US Army.

Wicker was never seen alive again after the war, and it is generally assumed that he was summarily executed by American soldiers during the Dachau liberation reprisals.
