= William Evens Hall =

American military officer

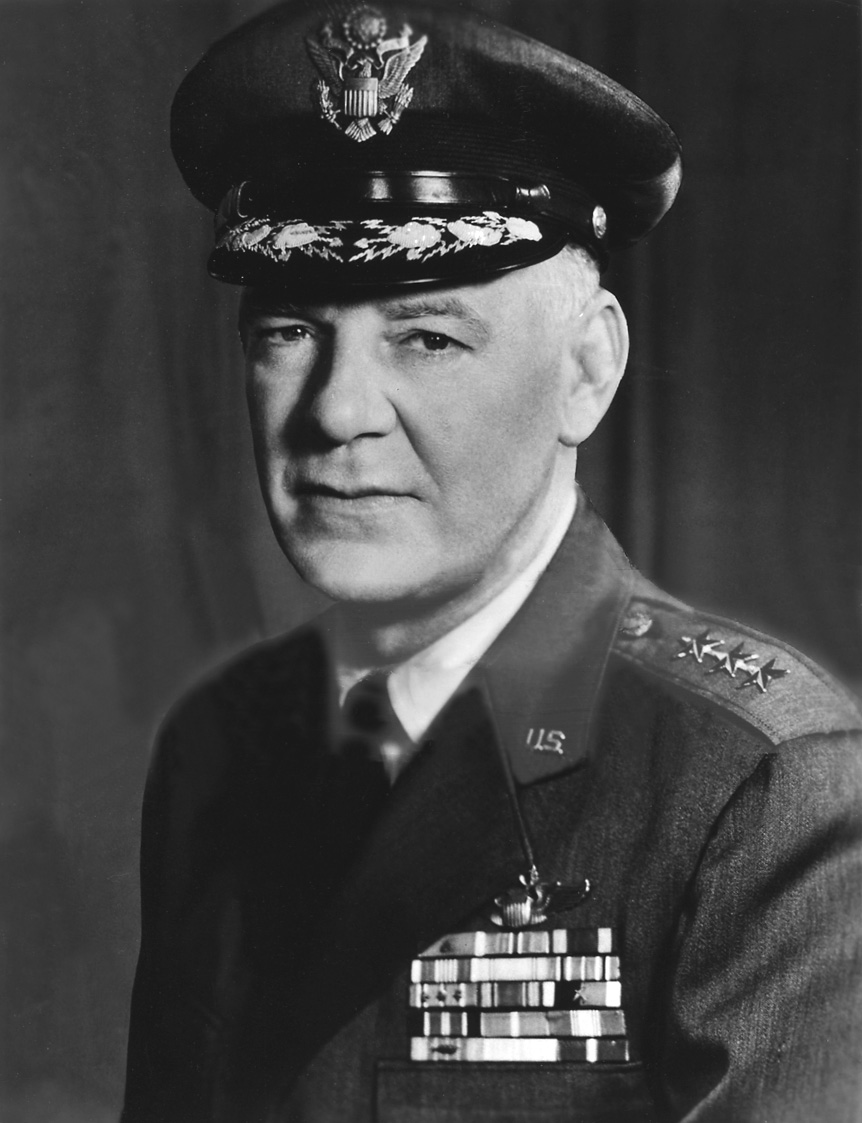
- Born: 22 October 1907; McAlester, Oklahoma, US
- Died: 28 May 1984 (aged 76); Washington, D.C., US
- Burial place: Arlington National Cemetery
- Military career
- Allegiance: United States
- Branch: United States Air Force
- Service years: 1929–1961
- Rank: Lieutenant General
- Nickname: "Bill"
- Commands: 15th Air Force; Continental Air Command
- Conflicts: World War II
- Awards: Reserve Officer's Association Minuteman Hall of Fame

William Evens Hall (22 October 1907 – 28 May 1984) was an American military officer who retired with the rank of lieutenant general in the United States Air Force.

== Early life and education ==
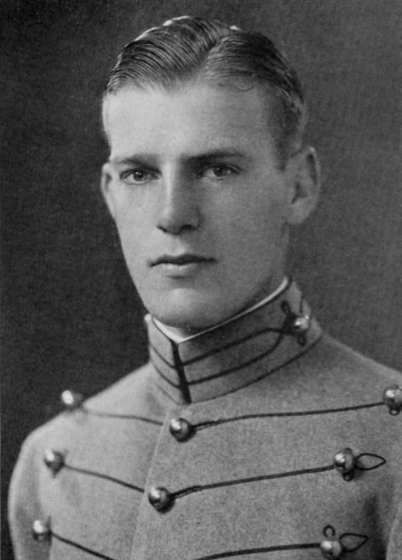
As a West Point cadet

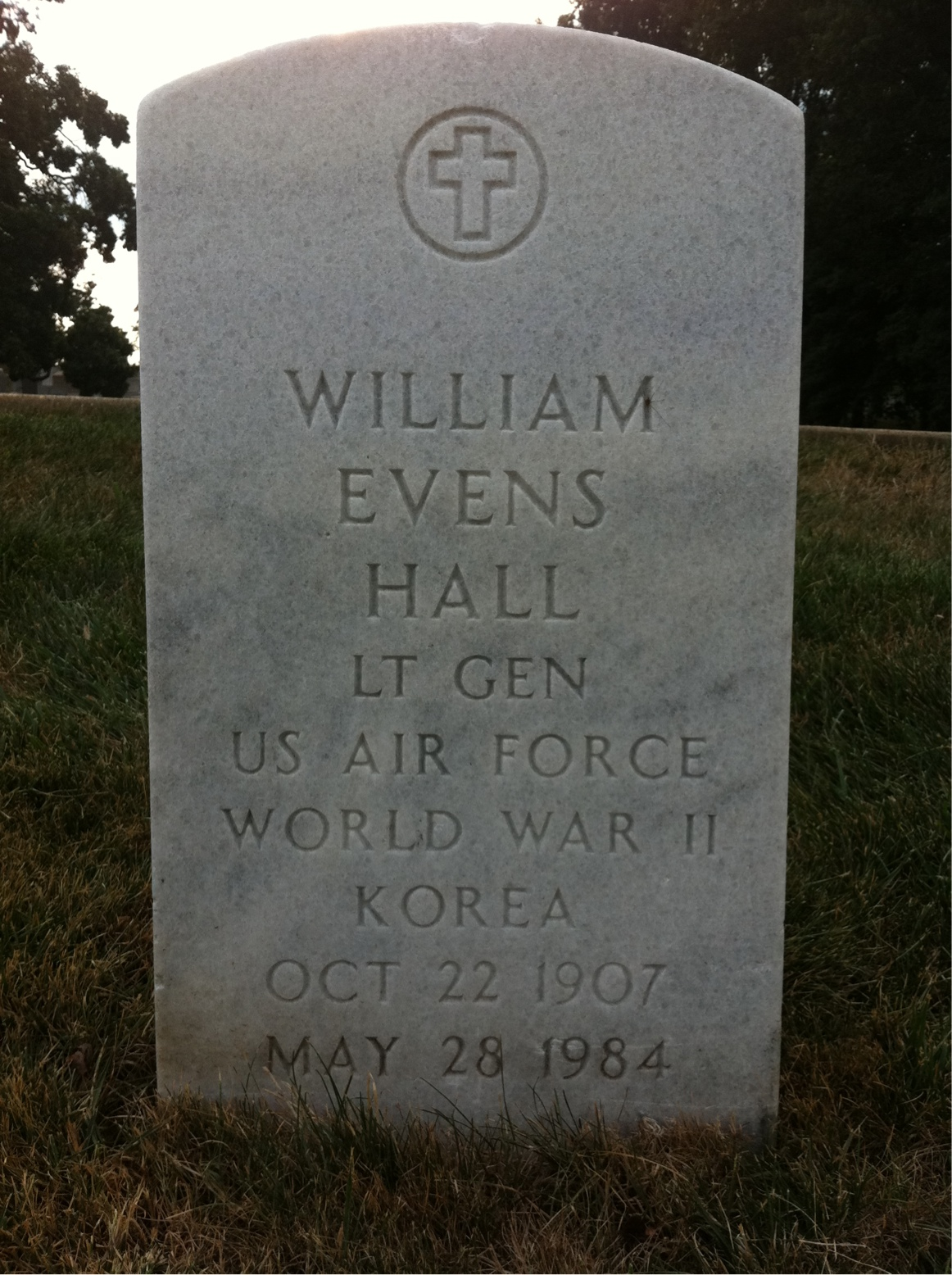
Grave at Arlington

Hall was born in McAlester, Oklahoma on 22 October 1907. He attended the U.S. Military Academy at West Point, graduating with the class of 1929. He was commissioned in the artillery. Following four years service with the Field Artillery, he entered Primary Flying School at Randolph Field, Texas, in 1933 and graduated from the Advanced Flying School at Kelly Field later that year, receiving his wings as a pilot in the old Army Air Corps.

He served actively during World War II, first as Deputy Chief of the Air Staff, Headquarters U.S. Army Air Forces and later as Deputy Commander of the 15th Air Force in Bari, Italy. After the war he was placed in charge of the United States Continental Air Command, an organization of more than 15,000 military personnel and over 8,000 civilian employees, and served as Senior Member and Air Force Representative to the United Nations Military Staff Committee in New York.

== Personal life ==
His first marriage, to Helena Callaway, with whom he had four children, ended in divorce. He was later married to photojournalist Marguerite Higgins from 1952 until her death in 1966. His second marriage produced three children, one of whom died in infancy.

An enthusiastic sportsman, he was active in athletics while at West Point where as a first classman, he captained the track team and received All-America honorable mention as a football center.

He was a boating and motorcycle enthusiast. He also loved animals, owning a kitten, two dogs (one a deaf Dalmatian), a canary and two parakeets.

== Honors ==
Lieutenant General Hall's decorations included the Distinguished Service Medal, the Legion of Merit, the Bronze Star and the Air Medal.

== Death and legacy ==
He died at Cape Canaveral Hospital in Cape Canaveral, Florida, of internal hemorrhaging on 28 May 1984. He was buried at Arlington National Cemetery.
