= Paul Richard Averitt =

American soldier and photographer (1923–2001)

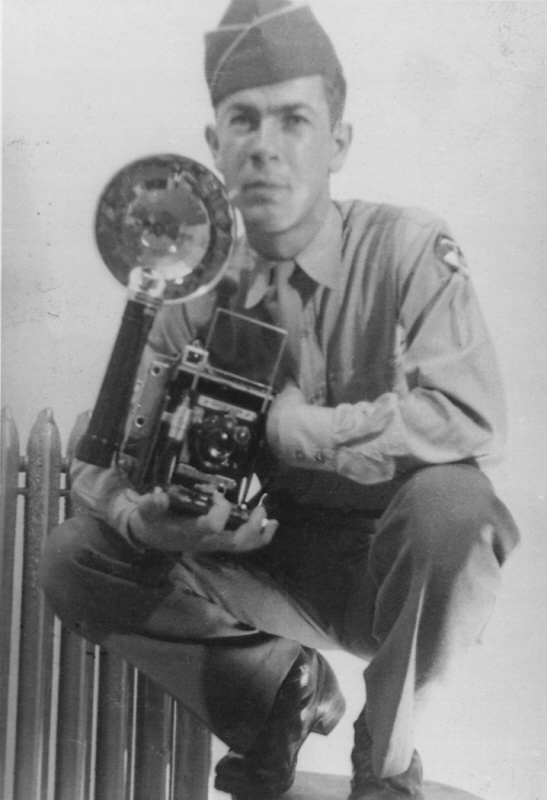
- Averitt in 1945
- Born: August 7, 1923; Nashville, Tennessee, U.S.
- Died: August 7, 2001 (aged 78)
- Known for: Photographs of Dachau concentration camp during its liberation

Paul Richard Averitt (August 7, 1923 – August 7, 2001) was an American soldier serving as a member of the US Army 92nd Signal Corps Battalion. He was one of the first photographers taking pictures at Dachau concentration camp during its liberation on April 29, 1945.

== Early life ==
Paul Richard Averitt was born on August 7, 1923, in Nashville, Tennessee. He was the son of Henry Clark Averitt (1892-1947) and Bessie Mai Baker Averitt (1890-1987). He had an older brother, James Edwin Averitt (1920-1981). He graduated from East High School.

== Army ==
On January 30, 1943, he enlisted and was assigned to the U.S. Army 92nd Signal Battalion Company A as a telephone and telegraph lineman. His duties were primarily to set up the communications prior to the movement of the troops. He spent more than one year in England and Ireland. Thereafter, his company went to Normandy on July 13, 1944 – one month after D-Day. They joined General Patton's Third Army and accompanied them through the North of France and the Rhineland. Company A often first arrived in an area vacated by the Germans and Paul Averitt documented his tour of duty in hundreds of photographs.

On April 29, 1945, he arrived at Dachau concentration camp, only hours after its liberation. Before entering the camp, Averitt came upon the death train from Buchenwald, and captured the corpses of the prisoners in at least seven photographs. He also documented the Dachau liberation reprisals, the revenge act of US troops killing some 30 to 50 SS guards – enraged after discovering the mass murder in the train and in the camp.

== Post army life ==
Averitt returned to the United States and was released from duty on December 2, 1945. Thereafter he worked for the family owned plant John Bouchard & Sons for forty years. He married Gradye Ruth. The couple had four daughters and eight grandchildren.

== Photographs ==
=== Corpses of prisoners in Dachau concentration camp ===
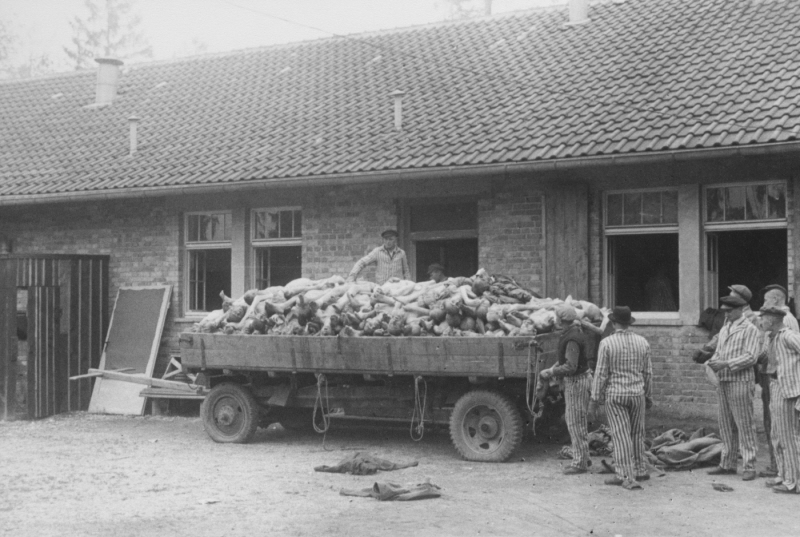

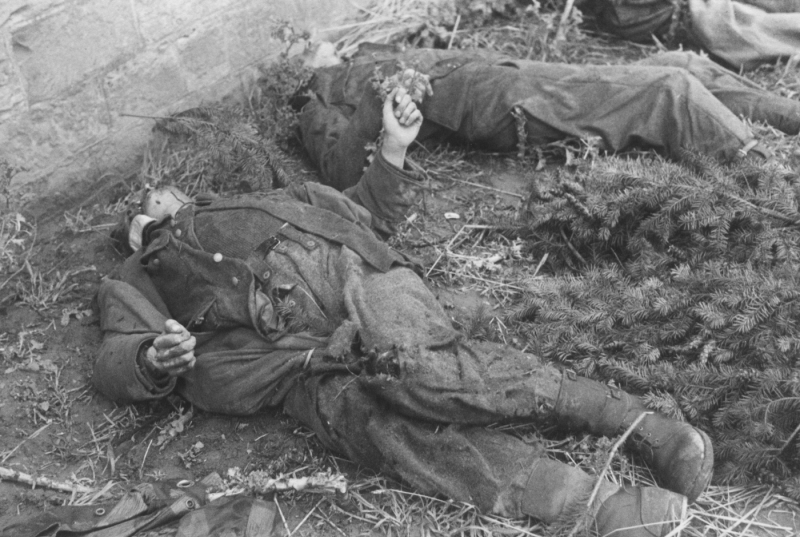

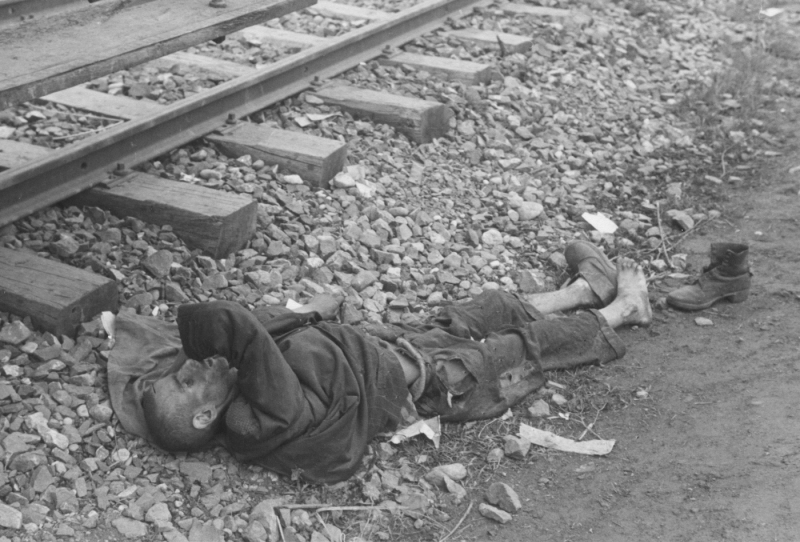

=== Death train from Buchenwald ===
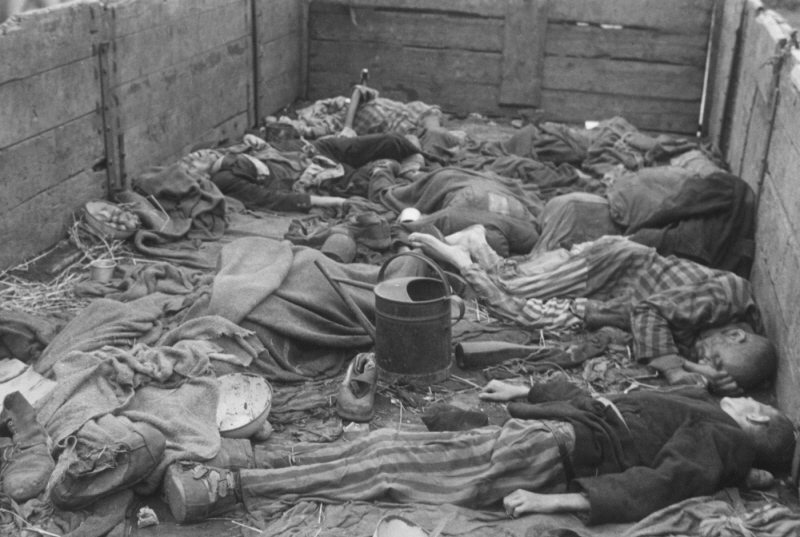

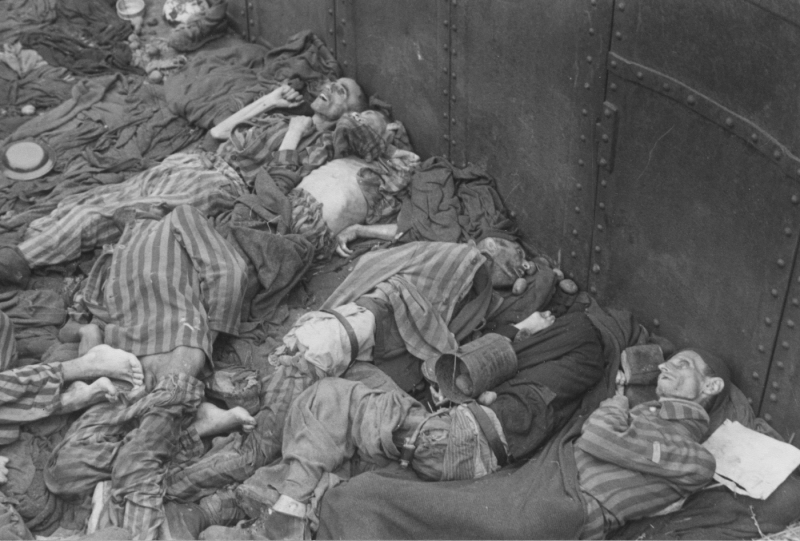

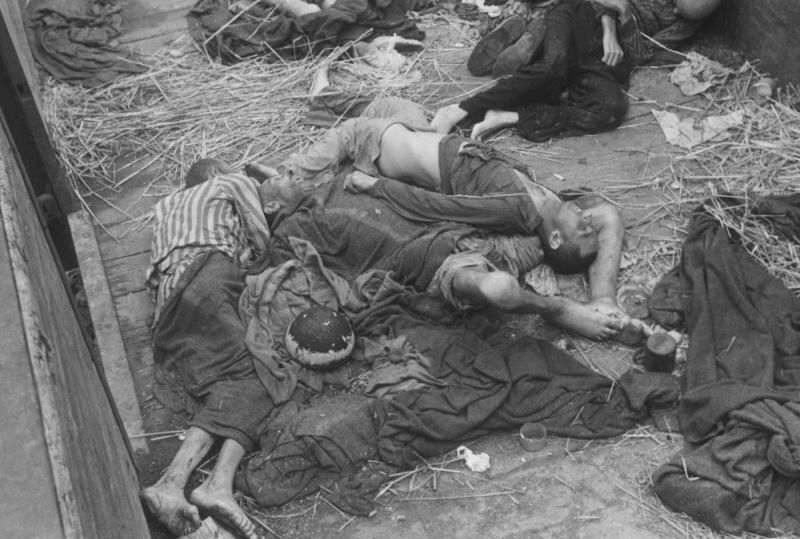

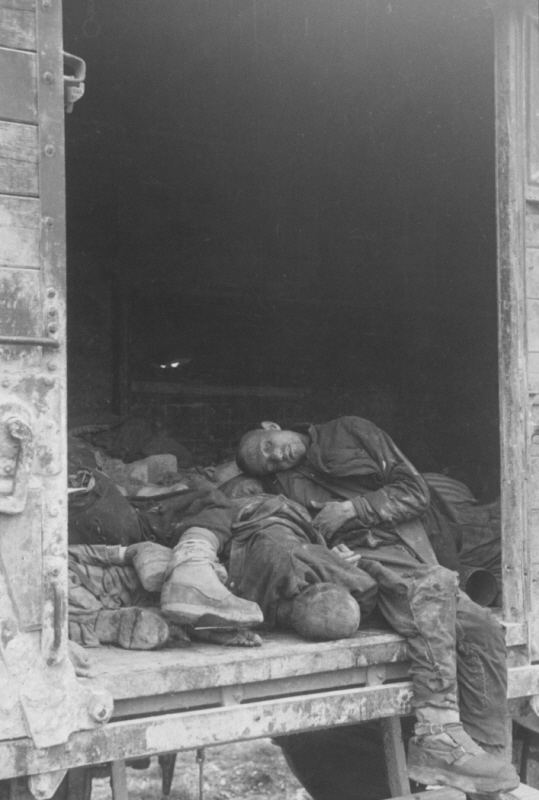

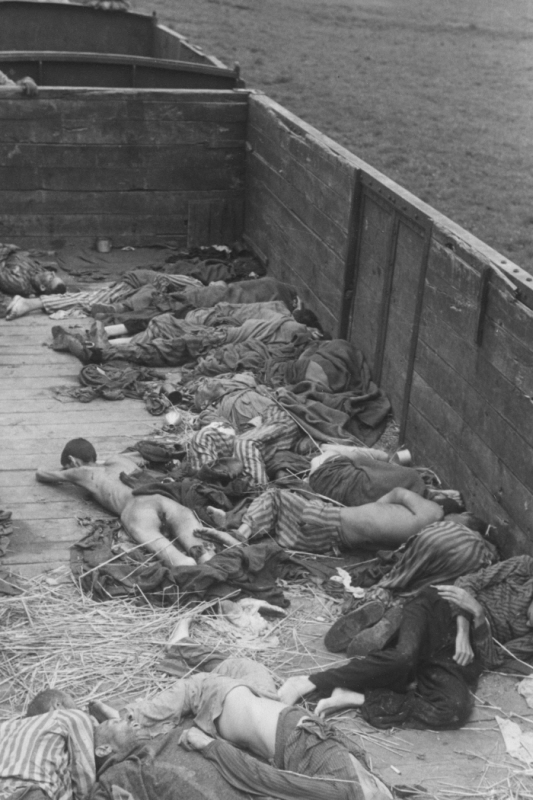

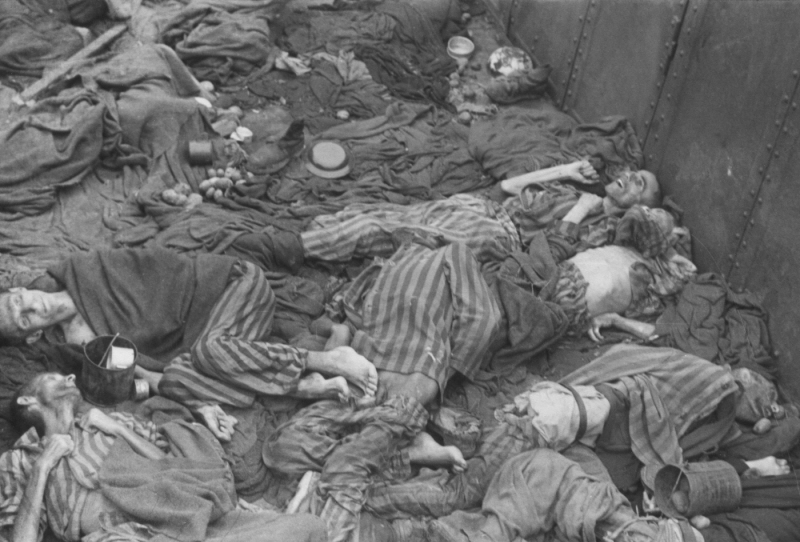
