= Stanley Moore (professor) =

American philosophy professor (1914–1997)

- Born: July 24, 1914; Oakland, California, U.S.
- Died: December 5, 1997 (aged 83); Santa Barbara, California, U.S.

Academic background
- Education: University of California, Berkeley

Academic work
- Institutions: Reed College; Barnard College; University of California, San Diego

Stanley Williams Moore (July 24, 1914 – December 5, 1997) was an American professor of philosophy, specializing in the study of Karl Marx. He taught at Reed College until 1954, when he was subpoenaed by the House Un-American Activities Committee and refused to answer questions about his political beliefs. He was fired by the college and worked part-time for Barnard College for the next decade, before being offered a full-time position with the University of California, San Diego.

== Early life ==
Moore was born on July 24, 1914, in Oakland, California. Growing up on Mission Peak on a ranch near San Jose, he studied philosophy at the University of California, Berkeley. He graduated with a bachelor's of arts degree in 1935 and studied briefly at Harvard University, before returning to Berkeley to receive his Ph.D. in 1940. After two years of teaching at Harvard, Moore was drafted into the U.S. Air Force during World War II and was stationed overseas in Britain and Russia. He later spoke about waiting to be drafted before joining the military because, as a Marxist, he was worried that he would not pass the background checks required for direct commission. After he left the military, he spent two terms at Cambridge University and then began teaching philosophy at Reed College in Portland, Oregon.

== Academic career ==
Moore was a social and political philosopher, specializing in the study of Karl Marx. He published four books, The Critique of Capitalist Democracy (1957), Three Tactics (1963), Marx and the Choice Between Socialism and Communism (1980), and Marx Versus Markets (1993).

=== Public hearing ===
Moore was a member of the Communist Party, although he later claimed to have left the party around 1953 due to a disillusionment with the Soviet Union, particularly citing the US organization's stance on the doctors' plot. Eighteen months later, he was subpoenaed by the House Un-American Activities Committee (HUAC), a congressional committee with the aim of identifying communists in the country. He was brought before a public hearing in Portland, where he refused to testify about his political beliefs, relying on the Fifth Amendment. Moore was suspended from his professorship with Reed College due to his testimony. In response, he wrote a 10-page open letter to the university about academic freedom, arguing that, "It is an abuse of power for an employer to question an employee about his politics. It is a travesty of justice to do so in an atmosphere created by pressure from influential demagogues". He claimed that the college was aware he was a Marxist and they had nevertheless promoted him to full professorship.

=== Later career ===
Moore was fired from the university in August 1954 and struggled to find other work for the next decade, teaching on a part-time basis at Barnard College from 1955 to 1965. He spoke alongside Herbert Marcuse and Lewis Feuer at a symposium titled "Marx Today", hosted by the University of California, San Diego in 1964 and on the basis of this talk, he was hired by the university, where he taught from 1965 to his retirement in 1974. In 1981, Reed College issued an official apology to Moore and the college president Steven S. Koblik invited him back in 1993 to give a lecture.

== Personal life ==
Moore was briefly married to Marguerite Higgins, a war correspondent. In 1950, he had a relationship with one of his undergraduate students, Fay Stender. He later married Daphne and had two daughters, Daisy and Dinah.

== Death ==
Moore died on December 5, 1997, in Santa Barbara, California, at the age of 83.

== Works ==
- The Critique of Capitalist Democracy (1957)
- Three Tactics: The Background in Marx (1963)
- Marx and the Choice Between Socialism and Communism (1980)
- Marx Versus Markets (1993)
