= Harry J. Collins =

United States Army general

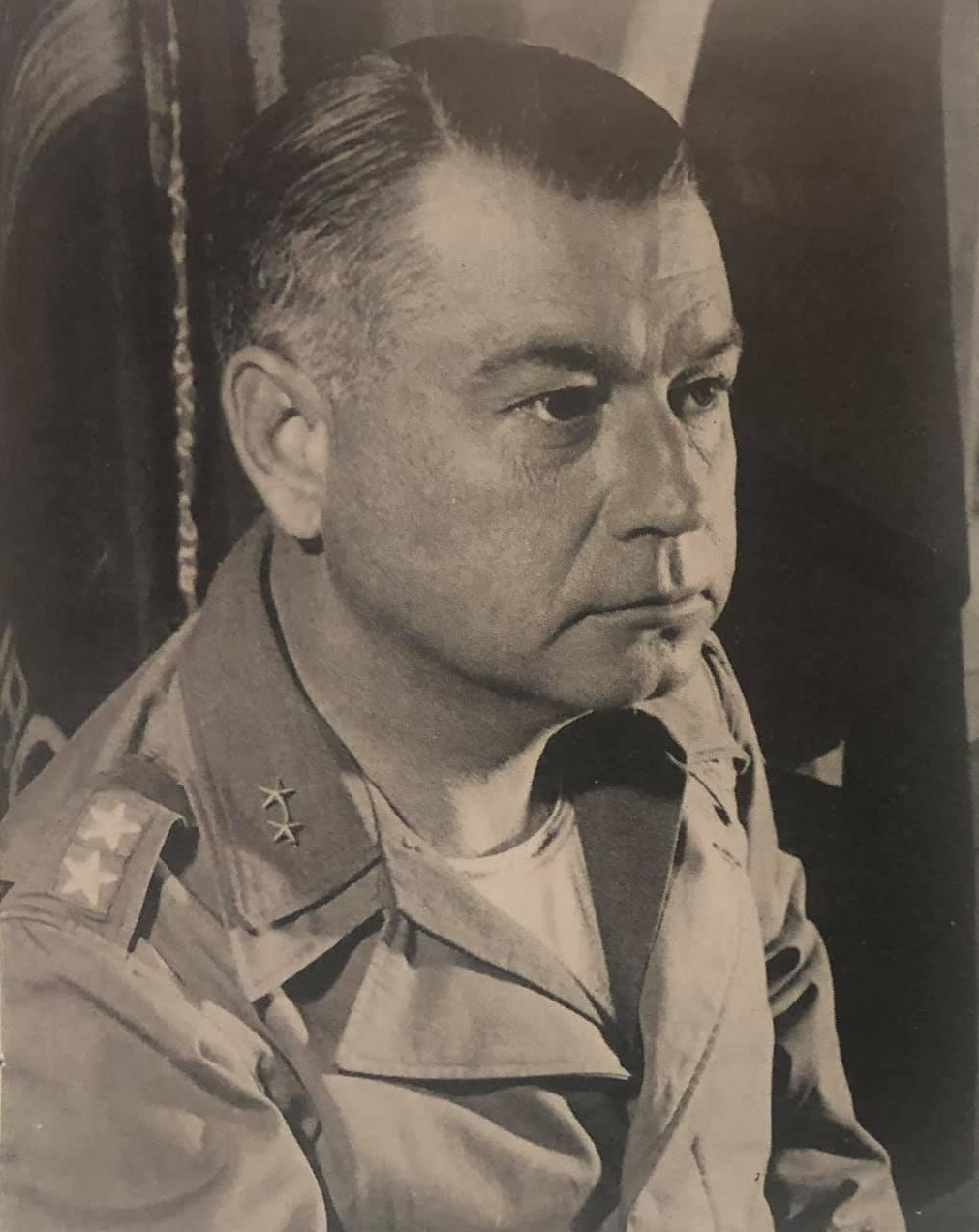
- Collins at Camp Gruber, Oklahoma in July 1944
- Born: December 7, 1895; Chicago, Illinois, United States
- Died: March 8, 1963 (aged 67); Salzburg, Austria
- Military career
- Allegiance: United States
- Branch: United States Army
- Service years: 1917–1954
- Rank: Major General
- Nickname: "Hollywood Harry"
- Service number: 0-7320
- Unit: Infantry Branch
- Commands: District of Maui, Hawaiian Department Service Command; Hawaii District, Hawaiian Department Service Command; Kilauea Military Camp; 1st Battalion, 7th Infantry Regiment; 345th Infantry Regiment; 42nd Infantry Division; 2nd Infantry Division; 8th Infantry Division; 31st Infantry Division
- Conflicts: World War I World War II; Cold War
- Awards: Army Distinguished Service Medal; Silver Star; Bronze Star (2)
- Other work: Vice president, North American Van Lines

Major General Harry John Collins (December 7, 1895 – March 8, 1963) was a decorated senior United States Army officer who commanded the 42nd "Rainbow" Infantry Division during World War II.

== Early life and military career ==
Collins was born in Chicago, Illinois on December 7, 1895, the son of John C. Collins and Margaret Collins. He was raised and educated in Hoboken, New Jersey and Sparta, Illinois and was the honor graduate of his Western Military Academy class in 1915. He attended the University of Chicago before leaving in 1917 to join the United States Army after America's entry into World War I.

Collins completed the course at the Officer Training Camp in Little Rock, Arkansas, in 1917, received his commission as a second lieutenant in the Infantry Branch, and was assigned to the 3rd Infantry Regiment.

Collins served with the 3rd Infantry on the Mexican Border at Eagle Pass, Texas, at the end of the Pancho Villa Expedition and during World War I.

== Between the wars ==
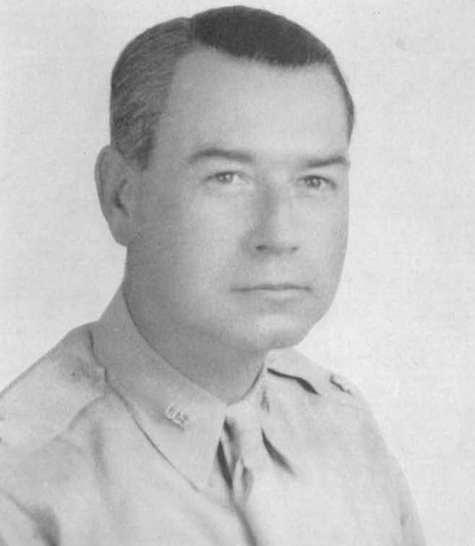
Collins as a lieutenant colonel with the 6th Infantry Division in 1940

Collins remained with the 3rd Infantry, including assignments at Camp Sherman, Ohio, and Fort Snelling, Minnesota. In 1922, he was assigned to the 19th Infantry Regiment at Schofield Barracks, Hawaii. He completed the Infantry Officer Course at Fort Benning, Georgia in 1926 and remained there as an instructor on the staff of the U.S. Army Infantry School. From 1929 to 1930, he was an instructor at Fort Ethan Allen, Vermont, and he completed the Infantry Advanced Course at Fort Benning in 1930.

A specialist with the placement and marksmanship of machine guns, he operated schools for machine gun operators at Fort Sam Houston, Texas, and Fort Warren in the early 1930s. Collins graduated from the U.S. Army Command and General Staff School in 1934. In 1935, he completed the Chemical Warfare Course and the United States Army War College.

Collins served in Hawaii again beginning in 1936; while assigned to the Hawaiian Department Service Command, he commanded the District of Maui in 1936 and the Hawaii District and Kilauea Military Camp from 1937 to 1938. In 1938, Collins moved to Vancouver Barracks, Washington, where he was the Plans, Operations and Training Officer (S3) for the 7th Infantry Regiment, and then commanded the regiment's 1st Battalion. After his battalion command he served as regimental executive officer until being assigned as assistant plans, operations and training officer (G3) and then intelligence officer (G2) for the 6th Infantry Division at Fort Snelling.

== World War II ==
At the start of World War II, Collins was assigned to the staff at the U.S. War Department and was sent to the United Kingdom as an observer and liaison officer.

Upon returning to the United States in November 1941, Collins first served as the intelligence officer for the IV Corps. The United States entered the war on December 7, 1941, following the Japanese attack on Pearl Harbor. As a full colonel, he then activated the 345th Infantry Regiment at Fort Carson, part of the 87th Infantry Division. In August 1942, Collins was named as the assistant division commander (ADC) of the 99th Infantry Division at Camp Van Dorn, Mississippi, and promoted to brigadier general.

In April 1943, he assumed command of the 42nd Infantry Division (the famed Rainbow Division) at Camp Gruber, Oklahoma, and was promoted to major general. As a senior commander, Collins earned the nickname "Hollywood Harry" for his flamboyant personal conduct, including use of a motorcycle escort with flashing lights and sirens when he traveled. He trained the 42nd Division in the United States for 16 months before departure for overseas service. In December 1944, the division arrived on the Western Front in the European Theater of Operations. The 42nd Division, under Collins and aided by Brigadier General Henning Linden as his ADC, played a major role in stopping the last German drive into Western Europe, known as the Battle of the Bulge. The division then went on to take part in the Western Allied invasion of Germany.

=== Dachau liberation ===
The 42nd Division was credited with the liberation of the Dachau concentration camp. As commander of the 42nd Division, Collins had defied convention by naming Rabbi (Captain) Eli Bohnen as the division chaplain, despite not having a large number of Jews in the division. According to contemporary accounts, Collins was moved by the plight of the prisoners he saw at Dachau, and took extraordinary measures to ensure they immediately received housing, food and medical attention. His example enabled Bohnen to successfully appeal for assistance from civilians in the United States, requesting items that the army was not prepared to supply, including kosher foods, religious articles and cash donations.

== Postwar ==
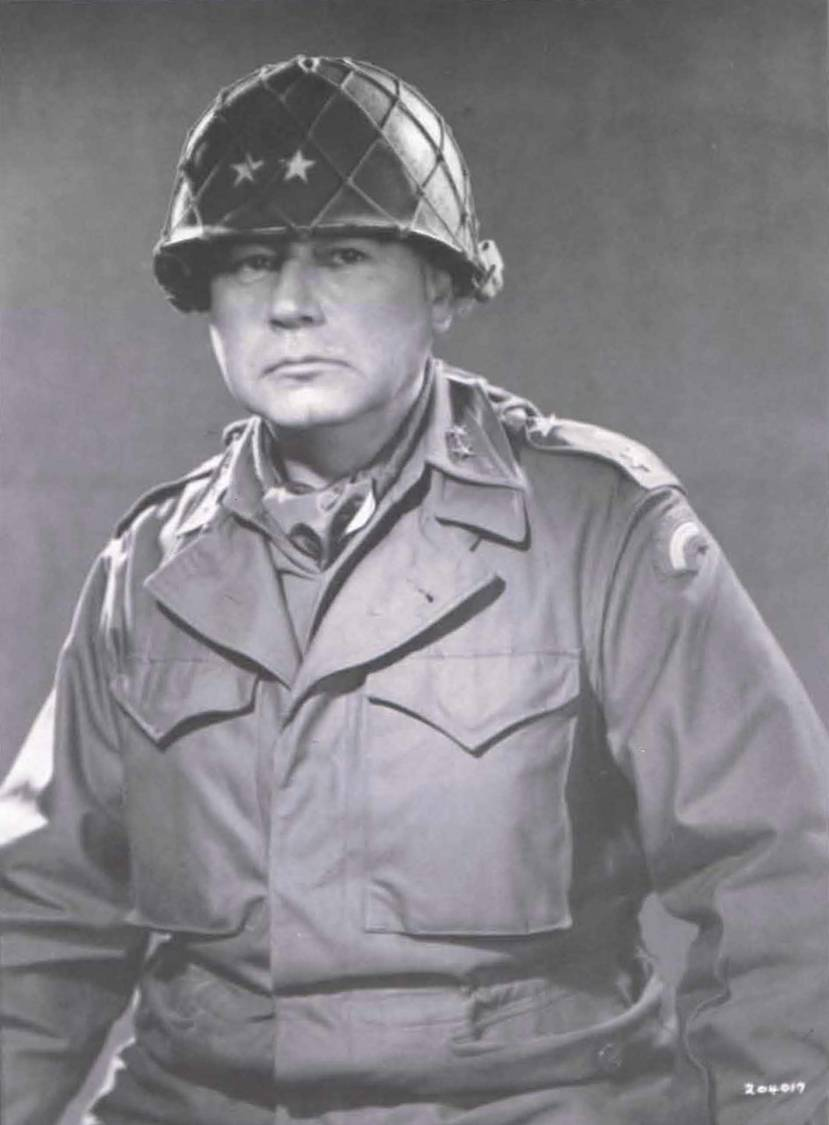
Major General Harry J. Collins in 1945.

Following Victory in Europe Day, the 42nd assumed occupation duty in western Austria, with Collins serving as military governor. In July 1948, he was appointed commander of the 2nd Infantry Division at Fort Lewis, Washington, and later assumed command of New York-New Jersey area headquarters at Fort Totten, New York.

In January 1951, he was assigned to command the 8th Division at Fort Jackson, South Carolina. A year later he was appointed military attache in Moscow, afterwards returning to the United States to command the 31st Infantry Division at Camp Atterbury, Indiana.

== Retirement, death and burial ==
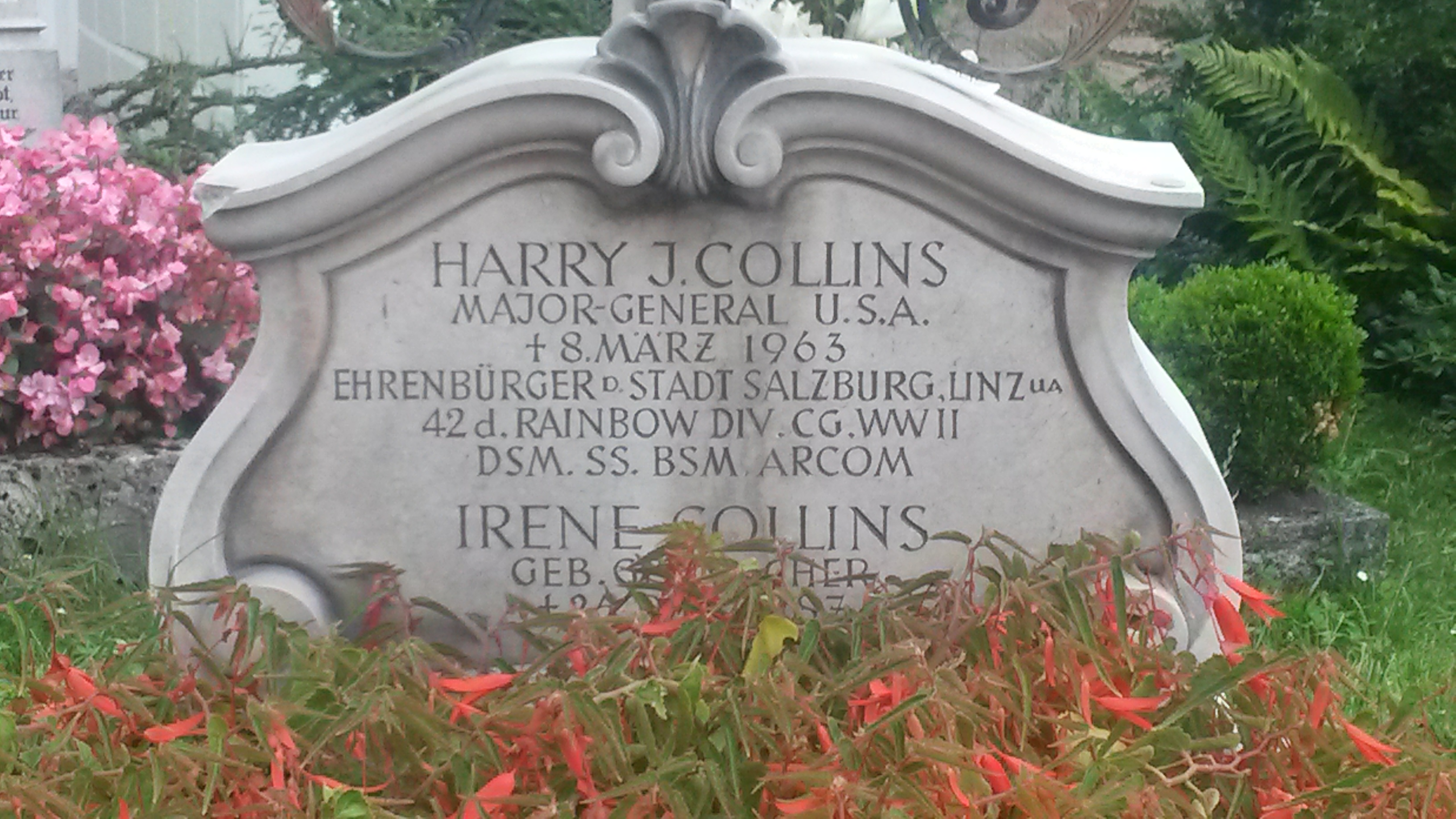
The gravestone of Major General Harry J. Collins in Salzburg.

He retired from the army after 37 years in 1954 and worked as a vice president for North American Van Lines and a consultant to the Human Research Organization at George Washington University.

Collins subsequently moved to Colorado, where he lived until retiring to Salzburg, where many Dachau survivors were initially transported after the liberation of the camp. In his later years he was in ill health and used a wheelchair as the result of injuries sustained in a car accident.

He died on March 8, 1963, and was buried at the Saint Peter's churchyard cemetery in Salzburg.

== Family ==
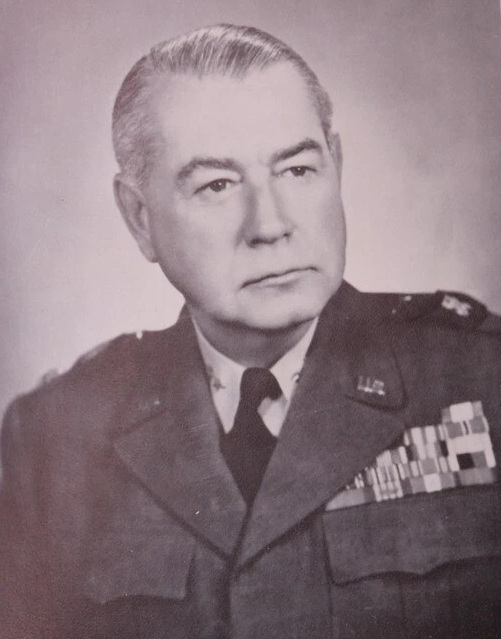
Collins as a major general shortly before retiring in mid-1954

Collins' first wife was Maude Alice McAlpin Collins (1897–1955). They were the parents of a daughter, Patricia Coyle Collins (1919–2000). Patricia Collins was the wife of army officer M. Griffith Berg, who became a Japanese prisoner of war, and died in the Philippines in 1944. She later married Robert C. Williams (1914–2000).

During his occupation duty in Austria, Collins met Irene Gehmacher, a native of that country. After his divorce from his first wife, he married Irene, who died in 1987.

== Controversy ==
Recent writers have found fault with Collins and other officers who performed occupation duty after World War II, suggesting that they requisitioned luxury items from the Hungarian Gold Train for furnishing their offices and quarters — items allegedly taken from Jewish families by the Nazis during the war. Many items were not returned to their original owners, who could not be located, but were later sold at auctions, with the proceeds used to aid war refugees.

== Decorations ==
Collins was an honorary citizen of both Salzburg and Linz.

Collins' ribbon bar included:

1st Row	Army Distinguished Service Medal	Silver Star	Bronze Star Medal with Oak Leaf Cluster	
2nd Row	Army Commendation Medal	Mexican Border Service Medal	World War I Victory Medal	American Defense Service Medal
3rd Row	American Campaign Medal	European–African–Middle Eastern Campaign Medal with three service stars	World War II Victory Medal	Army of Occupation Medal
4th Row	National Defense Service Medal	Chevalier of the Legion of Honor (France)	French Croix de guerre 1939-1945 with Palm	Officer of the Order of the Crown of Italy

== See also ==
Military offices
Preceded by Newly activated organization	Commanding General 42nd Infantry Division; 1943–1946	Succeeded by Post deactivated
Preceded by Paul Wilkins Kendall	Commanding General 2nd Infantry Division; 1948–1950	Succeeded by Laurence B. Keiser
Preceded by Frank C. McConnell	Commanding General 8th Infantry Division; 1951–1952	Succeeded by Whitfield P. Sheppard
Preceded by Alexander G. Paxton	Commanding General 31st Infantry Division; 1952–1953	Succeeded by Alexander G. Paxton
