= Henning Linden =

U.S. Army general (1892–1984)

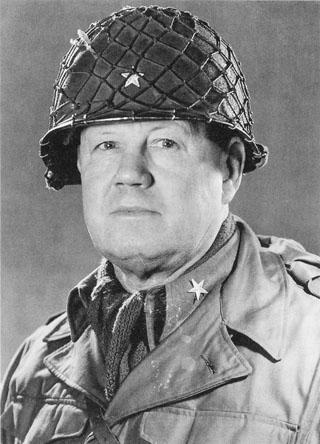
- Born: September 3, 1892; Mound, Minnesota, United States
- Died: March 15, 1984 (aged 91); McLean, Virginia, United States
- Burial place: Arlington National Cemetery, Virginia, United States
- Spouse: Marguerite Rachel Harshaw (m. 1922-1979, her death)
- Children: 1
- Military career
- Allegiance: United States
- Branch: United States Army
- Service years: 1917–1952
- Rank: Brigadier General
- Service number: 0-7009
- Unit: Infantry Branch
- Commands: Military Arts Department, United States Army Engineer School; Task Force Linden; 53rd Infantry Regiment; 3rd Battalion, 22nd Infantry Regiment
- Conflicts: World War I World War II
- Awards: Silver Star; Legion of Merit (2); Bronze Star Medal (2)

Brigadier General Henning Linden (September 3, 1892 – March 15, 1984) was a United States Army officer who served in World War II. He was notable for his role in the liberation of the Dachau concentration camp while serving as assistant division commander (ADC) of the 42nd Infantry Division.

== Early life ==
Henning Linden was born as Carl Henning Linden in Mound, Minnesota on September 3, 1892, to Swedish immigrant parents Charles A. Linden and Mary (Seaquist) Linden. He graduated from South High School in Minneapolis in 1912. Linden completed the Reserve Officers' Training Corps (ROTC) program at the University of Minnesota and was a cadet captain, graduating in 1917 with a Bachelor of Science degree in civil engineering. He then joined the United States Army as a second lieutenant of Infantry, assigned to the 40th Infantry Regiment.

== World War I to World War II ==
Linden commanded a company of the 33rd Infantry Regiment in Panama during World War I, followed by assignment to the 55th Infantry Regiment at Camp Meade, Maryland. In the early 1920s Linden was assistant professor of Military Science for the ROTC program at the University of Maryland. In the early 1930s Linden was adjutant of the garrison at Fort Leavenworth, Kansas.

In 1936 Linden graduated from the U.S. Army Command and General Staff College and was reassigned to Fort McClellan, Alabama, where he commanded the 3rd Battalion, 22nd Infantry Regiment.

In the early 1940s Linden was an assistant professor of Military Science for the ROTC program at Boston University.

== World War II ==
By the time of the American entry into World War II, in December 1941, Linden was commander of the 53rd Infantry Regiment in the Aleutian Islands as the United States retook them from Japan.

In 1943 Linden was promoted to the general officer rank of brigadier general and was assigned to be the assistant division commander (ADC) of the 42nd (Rainbow) Infantry Division, commanded by Major General Harry J. Collins. He commanded its three infantry regiments as "Task Force Linden", which arrived in Marseille, France, that fall, deployed in an attempt to prevent two German armies in Alsace from breaking out, and successfully defended along a 30-mile front. Two units of "Task Force Linden", the 222nd Infantry Regiment and the 1st Battalion, 242nd Infantry Regiment, were awarded Presidential Unit Citations for extraordinary heroism.

At the end of January 1945 the remainder of the division arrived in France, and as part of Lieutenant General Alexander Patch's Seventh Army the 42nd penetrated German defenses in the Haardt mountains, crossed the Siegfried Line, bridged the Rhine River, and captured the cities of Würzburg, Schweinfurt, Fürth and Donauwörth.

=== Dachau liberation ===
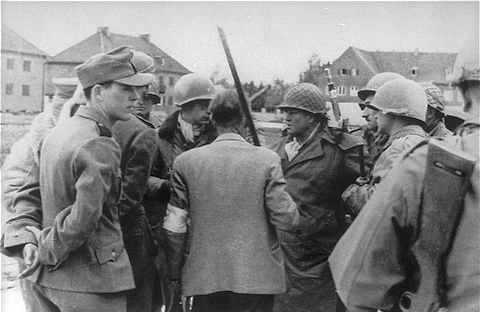
SS men confer with Brigadier General Henning Linden (netted helmet, looking right) during the liberation of the Dachau concentration camp (April 29, 1945).

On April 29, 1945, Linden led a 42nd Division detachment to liberate the Dachau concentration camp. Journalists including Marguerite Higgins traveled with Linden's detachment, resulting in international headlines about the soldiers' liberation of more than 30,000 Jews and political prisoners.

== After the war ==
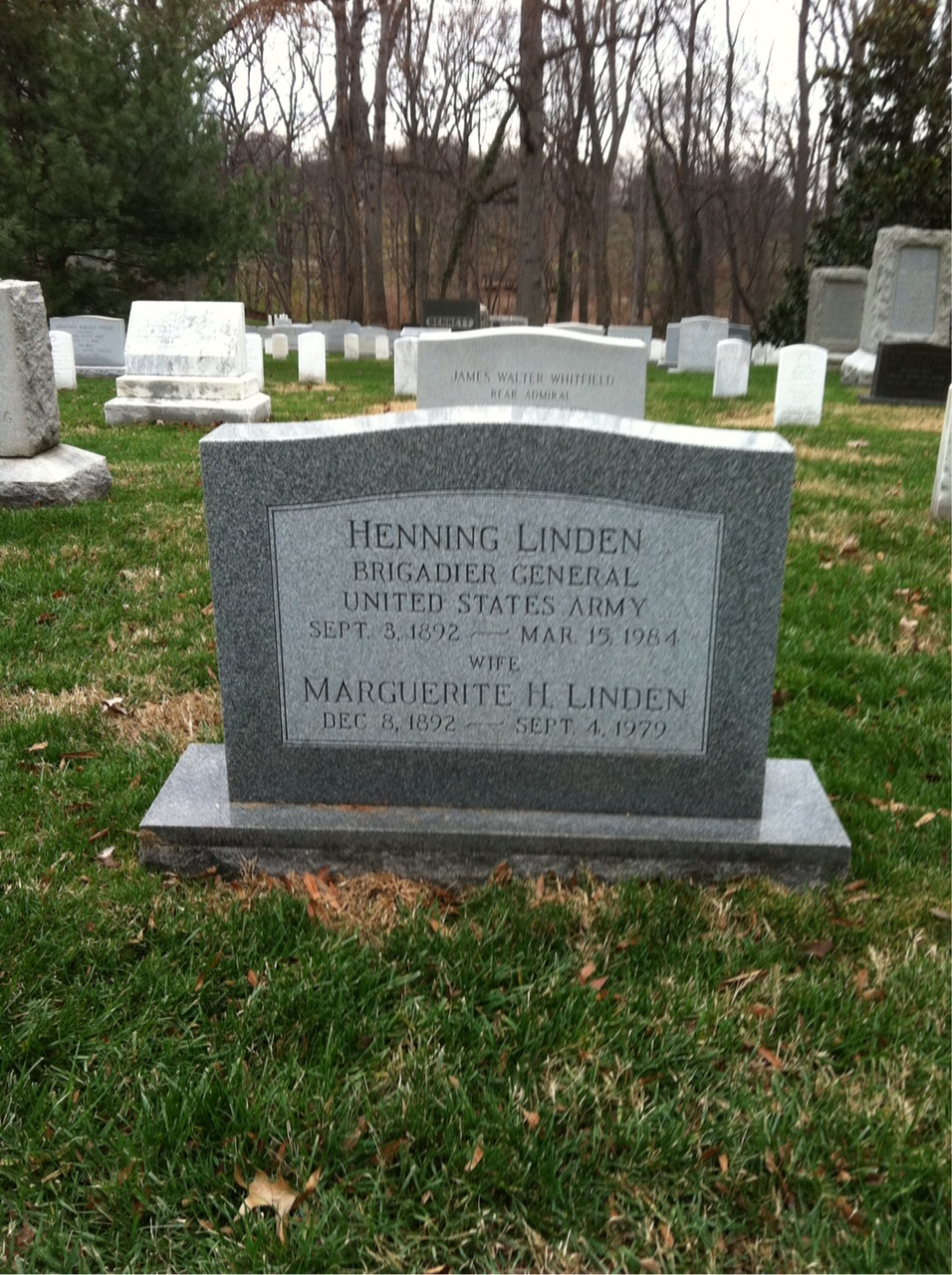
The grave of Brigadier General Henning Landen at Arlington National Cemetery.

After the war Linden served in occupied Austria as Deputy Commander of the American Occupation Zone. After returning to the United States he was Chief of the Army's Military Arts Department at the Engineer School until he retired in 1952.

Linden died in McLean, Virginia on March 15, 1984. He was buried at Arlington National Cemetery, Section 1, Site 792-E.

== Family ==
On August 5, 1922, Linden married Marguerite Rachel Harshaw (1892–1979). They were the parents of a son, John Henning Linden (1924–2007).

== Dachau controversy ==
For years there has been an ongoing controversy between adherents of Felix L. Sparks and those of Linden over whether the 45th Infantry Division or 42nd Division troops led by Linden were the actual liberators of Dachau. Linden's son, Colonel John H. Linden addressed the question in 1997's Surrender of the Dachau Concentration Camp, 29 APR 45: The True Account, referring to numerous firsthand accounts and primary-source documents to bolster his father's version of events.

== Looting controversy ==
Historians and authors researching World War II have found fault with Linden, Harry J. Collins and other officers who performed occupation duty after the war, suggesting that they requisitioned luxury items from the Hungarian Gold Train for furnishing their offices and quarters — items allegedly taken from Jewish families by the Nazis during the war. Linden is reported to have received 10 rugs for his quarters on the von Trapp Estate. Many items were not returned to their original owners, who had been killed or displaced during the war, but were later sold at auctions, with the proceeds used to aid war refugees.

== Awards and decorations ==
Linden's awards and decorations included:

Silver Star
Legion of Merit with one oak leaf cluster
Bronze Star Medal with one oak leaf cluster
Army Commendation Medal with one oak leaf cluster
World War I Victory Medal
World War II Victory Medal
European-African-Middle Eastern Campaign Medal with (3) bronze service stars
Asiatic-Pacific Campaign Medal
American Defense Service Medal
Army of Occupation Medal
National Defense Service Medal
Croix de Guerre (France)
Commander of the Order of Leopold II (Belgium)
