= Ardelia Ripley Hall =

American cultural affairs officer

- Born: December 4, 1899; Weymouth, Massachusetts, United States
- Died: 1979; Greenfield, Massachusetts, United States
- Education: Smith College (BA 1922) Columbia University (MA 1927)
- Occupations: Fine Arts and Monuments Adviser

Ardelia Ripley Hall (1899–1979) was a cultural affairs officer at the United States Department of State from 1946 to 1964, where she specialized in post-World War II restitution of Nazi-looted art.

== Background ==
Born in Weymouth, Massachusetts, Hall attended Smith College in 1922. While working as a research assistant at the Metropolitan Museum of Art, Hall attended Columbia University and received her MA in Chinese language in 1927. She also worked as a curatorial assistant in the Department of Asiatic Art at the Museum of Fine Arts, Boston, and as a researcher of Asian art at the Harvard-Yenching Institute.

In April 1943, due to her extensive knowledge of Asian art, Hall was hired by the Far East Division of the Office of Strategic Services (OSS). Her tasks included editing, researching, and compiling reports on socioeconomic conditions in the Far East to be used in matters of state between the United States, Japan, and China.

In October 1944, she was granted temporary leave to assist the Museum of Fine Arts, Boston with the reinstallation of its collection of Asian art. Hoping to secure an early position with the Roberts Commission, she began unofficially advising The Committee for the Protection of Cultural Treasures in the War Areas –chaired by William B. Dinsmoor– under the American Council of Learned Societies (ACLS) on the creation of maps of culturally significant sites in China.

== Roberts Commission and After ==
Hall joined the Roberts Commission in early December 1945 as a consultant in the Division of Cultural Cooperation in the U.S. Department of State for Japan and Korea. From her desks at both the Library of Congress and the National Gallery of Art, she acted as a liaison between the Roberts Commission and MFAA officers in the Pacific Theater, namely Monuments Man Lt. Comdr. George L. Stout and Maj. Laurence Sickman. Hall prepared reports, lists, charts, and tables detailing all manner of subjects relating to works of art, monuments, archives, and other national treasures in Japan and its formerly occupied territories.

From 1946 to 1962, Hall served as the Fine Arts and Monuments Adviser to the U.S. Department of State’s Office of International Information and Cultural Affairs, whose office had assumed the duties of the recently disbanded Roberts Commission. She was "the driving force at the State Department for postwar restitution between 1946 and 1962." From her offices in Washington D.C. Hall, was known throughout the U.S. government as a workhorse and an invaluable resource in coordinating repatriation efforts. She corresponded and collaborated with counterparts in other governments to identify the rightful owners of stolen art, including Rose Valland in France. Hall helped to return a rare copy of the Mainz Psalter — one of ten known to exist, and part of the second printed series of books (after the Gutenberg Bible) — to the State Library of Saxony in Dresden, a portrait of Saint Catherine by Peter Paul Rubens to the Dusseldorf Museum, and a Monet landscape painting to the Rothschild family.

During the 1950s, Hall, as an Asian-art specialist, would ensure that cultural items were preserved during the Korean War. In 1954, she traveled to Korea as a representative of the U.S. Department of State to survey museums, temples, monasteries, and other cultural monuments. In South Korea, she personally returned a tenth-century sword to the royal household in Seoul, which had been stolen by an American soldier.

== Legacy ==
The Monuments, Fine Arts and Archives Records Concerning the Central Collecting Points are also known as the "Ardelia Hall Collection" in honor of her extensive work in maintaining and organizing these materials. Housed in the collection of the National Archives and Records Administration at College Park, Maryland, the Ardelia Hall Collection includes the records of the Roberts Commission, field reports of the Monuments Men, minutes from international conferences, over 50,000 photographic property cards from the Munich Central Collecting Point, and correspondence with international museum professionals.
