= Marguerite Higgins =

American journalist (1920–1966)

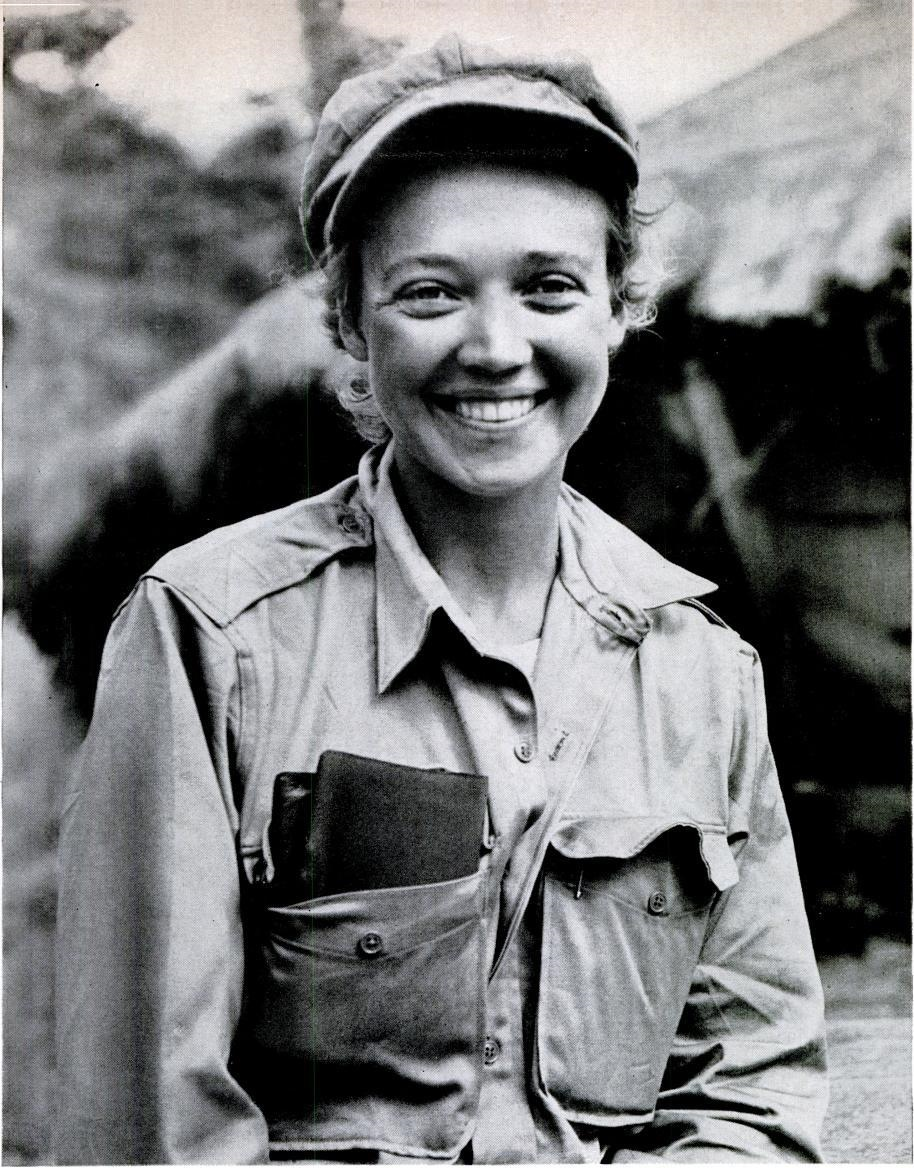
- Photo from October 1951 Life magazine article by Carl Mydans
- Born: September 3, 1920; British Hong Kong
- Died: January 3, 1966 (aged 45); Washington, D.C., US
- Burial place: Arlington National Cemetery
- Occupations: reporter and war correspondent
- Known for: first woman to win a Pulitzer Prize for Foreign Correspondence; advanced the cause of equal access for female war correspondents

Marguerite Higgins Hall (September 3, 1920 – January 3, 1966) was an American reporter and war correspondent. Higgins covered World War II, the Korean War, and the Vietnam War, and in the process advanced the cause of equal access for female war correspondents. She had a long career with the New York Herald Tribune (1942–1963) and as a syndicated columnist for Newsday (1963–1965). She was the first woman to win a Pulitzer Prize for Foreign Correspondence awarded in 1951 for her coverage of the Korean War. She subsequently won Long Island University's George Polk Award for Foreign Reporting for articles from behind enemy lines in Korea and other nations in 1952.

== Early life and education ==
Higgins was born on September 3, 1920, in British Hong Kong, where her father, Lawrence Higgins, was working at a shipping company. Her father, an Irish-American, met his future wife and Higgins's mother, Marguerite de Godard Higgins (who was of French aristocratic descent) in WWI Paris. Shortly afterward, they moved to Hong Kong, where their daughter was born.

The family moved back to the United States three years later and settled in Oakland. Higgins's father lost his job during the 1929 stock market crash, which promoted anxiety for the family. In her autobiography, News Is a Singular Thing, Higgins wrote that it was the worst day of her childhood:

It was on that day that I began worrying about how I'd earn a living when I grew up. I was then eight years old. Like millions of others brought up in the thirties, I was haunted by the fear that there might be no place for me in our society.

Regardless, the family managed. Higgins's father eventually got a job at a bank and her mother was able to get Higgins a scholarship to the Anna Head School in Berkeley, in exchange for taking a position as a French teacher.

=== University of California, Berkeley ===
Higgins started at the University of California, Berkeley, in the fall of 1937, where she was a member of the Gamma Phi Beta sorority and wrote for The Daily Californian, serving as an editor in 1940.

After graduating from Berkeley in 1941 with a B.A. in French, she headed to New York with a single suitcase and seven dollars in her pocket with the intent of getting a newspaper job. She planned to give herself a year to find a job, and if that failed, she would return to California to be a French teacher. Having arrived in late summer, she applied to the master's program at the Columbia University School of Journalism.

=== Columbia University ===
She walked into the New York Herald Tribune city office after arriving in New York in August 1941. She met with the city editor at the time, L. L. "Engel" Engelking, and showed him her clippings. While he didn't offer her a job at the time, he told her to come back in a month and maybe he'd have a position for her. She decided to stay in New York and studied at Columbia.

She had to fight her way into Columbia. Having tried to get in just days before the program began, the university said that all the slots allotted to women were filled. After multiple pleadings and meetings, the university said they would consider her if she was able to get all her transcripts and five letters of recommendations from her previous professors. Instantly, she got on the phone to call her father to arrange for all the materials from Berkeley to be sent to Columbia. A student dropped out of the program right before the first day and Higgins was in.

Upset that the coveted campus correspondent for the New York Herald Tribune had been filled by her classmate Murray Morgan, she did her best to outdo her classmates, most of them men. According to one of her professors, John Tebbel, her beauty matched her brains, being one of the best of her class:

Even in a class full of stars, she stood out. Maggie was positively dazzling, with a blonde beauty that hardly concealed her equally dazzling intelligence. She was all hard-edged ambition. In those days women had to be tougher to succeed in journalism, a male-dominated and essentially chauvinistic business, and Maggie carried toughness to the outer edge, propelled by driving ambition, which was soon apparent to us all.

In 1942, Higgins replaced her classmate as the campus correspondent for the Tribune, which led to a full-time reporting position.

== Career ==
External videos
- Pioneering Women War Correspondents by Penny Colman, YouTube video

=== World War II ===
Eager to become a war correspondent, Higgins persuaded the management of the New York Herald Tribune to send her to Europe in 1944, after working for the paper for two years. After being stationed in London and Paris, she was reassigned to Germany in March 1945. She witnessed the liberation of the Dachau concentration camp in April 1945 and received a U.S. Army campaign ribbon for her assistance during the surrender by its S.S. guards. She later covered the Nuremberg war trials and the Soviet Union's blockade of Berlin. In 1947, she became the chief of the Tribune bureau in Berlin.

=== Korea ===
In 1950, Higgins was named chief of the Tribune's Tokyo bureau, and she received a cold welcome by her colleagues in Tokyo. She later learned that a recently published novel by her colleague in Berlin had created a hostile impression. The novel, Shriek With Pleasure, depicted a female reporter in Berlin who stole stories and slept with sources. The gossip at the time speculated that the novelist, Toni Howard, based the main character on Higgins, raising suspicion and hostility among Tokyo staffers. Shortly after her arrival in Japan, war broke out in Korea, she came to the country as one of the first reporters on the spot. On 28 June, Higgins and three of her colleagues witnessed the Hangang Bridge bombing, and were trapped on the north bank of Han River as a result. After crossing the river by raft and coming to the U.S. military HQ in Suwon on the next day, she was quickly ordered out of the country by General Walton Walker, who argued that women did not belong at the front and the military had no time to worry about making separate accommodations for them. Higgins made a personal appeal to Walker's superior officer, General Douglas MacArthur, who subsequently sent a telegram to the Tribune stating: "Ban on women correspondents in Korea has been lifted. Marguerite Higgins is held in highest professional esteem by everyone." This was a major breakthrough for all female war correspondents. Her initial banishment from Korea and MacArthur's subsequent reversal allowing Higgins to remain at the front made headlines in the United States and made her into a bit of a celebrity.

While in Korea, the Tribune sent over Homer Bigart, to cover the war in Korea, and he told Higgins to go back to Tokyo. She refused and the Tribune allowed her to stay, which would lead to a competitive feud between the two that would result in both receiving the 1951 Pulitzer Prize for International Reporting. They shared the honor with four other male war correspondents.

=== Covering world affairs ===
As a result of her reporting from Korea, Higgins received the 1950 George Polk Memorial Award from the Overseas Press Club. She contributed along with other major journalistic and political figures to the Collier's magazine collaborative special issue Preview of the War We Do Not Want, with an article entitled "Women of Russia".

Higgins continued to cover foreign affairs throughout the rest of her life, interviewing world leaders such as Francisco Franco, Nikita Khrushchev and Jawaharlal Nehru. In 1955, she established and became chief of the Tribune's Moscow bureau and was the first American correspondent allowed back into the Soviet Union after Stalin's death.

=== Vietnam ===
In 1963, she joined Newsday and was assigned to cover South Vietnam, where she "visited hundreds of villages", interviewed most of the major figures, and wrote a book entitled Our Vietnam Nightmare. While in South Vietnam, another feud developed between Higgins and David Halberstam, a New York Times correspondent who was assigned to replace Bigart. Her battle was not for scoops or headlines this time. Instead, it was based on the ideological differences and ego between an experienced correspondent, Higgins, and a young Halberstam.

As a war correspondent with two decades under her belt, Higgins's anti-Communist sentiments were well established. There were many Buddhist protests against the Ngo Dinh Diem regime, which she believed were set up by communists. This contradicted Halberstam's views and reporting, who thought of Higgins as a "past-her-prime sell-out whose anti-Communist views rose to the level of propaganda." Halberstam and many of the young correspondents in Vietnam at the time opposed the Diem regime and reported a negative view of the war. Higgins believed they did not have a real understanding of the war and oftentimes called them Rover Boys, who never ventured outside of Saigon to the countryside to see what was going on. The Higgins–Halberstam rivalry never seemed to end, as Halberstam would continue to criticize her after her death in 1966.

== Criticism in the workplace ==
From a young age, Higgins was competitive, a habit that continued well into the newsroom and reporting abroad. One of her classmates at Columbia, Flora Lewis, recalled that Higgins was persistent. After receiving a class assignment for a story, Higgins made it to the library before her classmates and checked out all the relevant resources available. She remarked that, that was what female journalists at the time had to do:

I feel that people critical of Maggie and her so-called dirty tricks forget just how hard it was in those days to be a woman in a man's world. The odds were enormous. Even women were against you. They could be so cruel in such subtle ways... Ambition was a dirty word then. Careers were just something you fooled around with until the right man came along. Maggie didn't know that game. She was earnest and played for keeps.

Faculty and peers who knew Higgins claimed that she would use her "sex appeal" to get difficult interviews or stories. Columbia faculty member John Tebbel said that she used her charms to get a police commissioner to give one of the few interviews he'd ever given. Higgins was eager and willing to do what was necessary to get the story. Some of her male colleagues at the time also accused her of going so far as to perform sexual favors for interviews or information. There is no proof to substantiate these accusations, and other high-achieving female correspondents also experienced this sexism in the workplace.

At the time, journalism was a male-dominated industry with double standards. Men's sexual behaviors and habits were deemed irrelevant to their work, nor were they criticized for sleeping around to get information or stories. Men saw the world of reporting as their own territory and were oftentimes not willing to share with women entering the field, according to Carl Mydans, a former photographer for Life. He said:

That a woman would invade the war area—their most sacred domain—and then turn out to be equally talented and sometimes more courageous was something that couldn't be accepted gracefully.

Ambitious and high-achieving female journalists were often accused of sleeping around or using their sex appeal to get the best assignments, sources, or to boost their career. It became prominent gossip with little regard to truth. Higgins was well aware of what her male peers were saying about her, but she refused to pay it any attention and continued to do her job.

== Personal life ==
While at Berkeley, she met her first husband, Stanley Moore, a teaching assistant in the philosophy department. They were reportedly attracted to each other, but no relationship formed while in Berkeley. When Higgins moved to New York, she became reacquainted with Moore, who was then a philosophy professor at Harvard. They married in 1942. He was soon drafted into WWII, and their relationship fell apart, ending in a divorce finalized in 1947.

In 1952, she married William Evens Hall, a U.S. Air Force major general, whom she met while bureau chief in Berlin. They were married in Reno and settled down in Marin County. Their first daughter, born in 1953, died five days after a premature birth. In 1958, she gave birth to a son, named Lawrence Higgins Hall and in 1959, a daughter, Linda Marguerite Hall. By 1963, Hall had retired from the Air Force and went to work for an electronics firm, with a weekly commute to New York, returning to their home in Washington, D.C., by Friday.

== Death and legacy ==
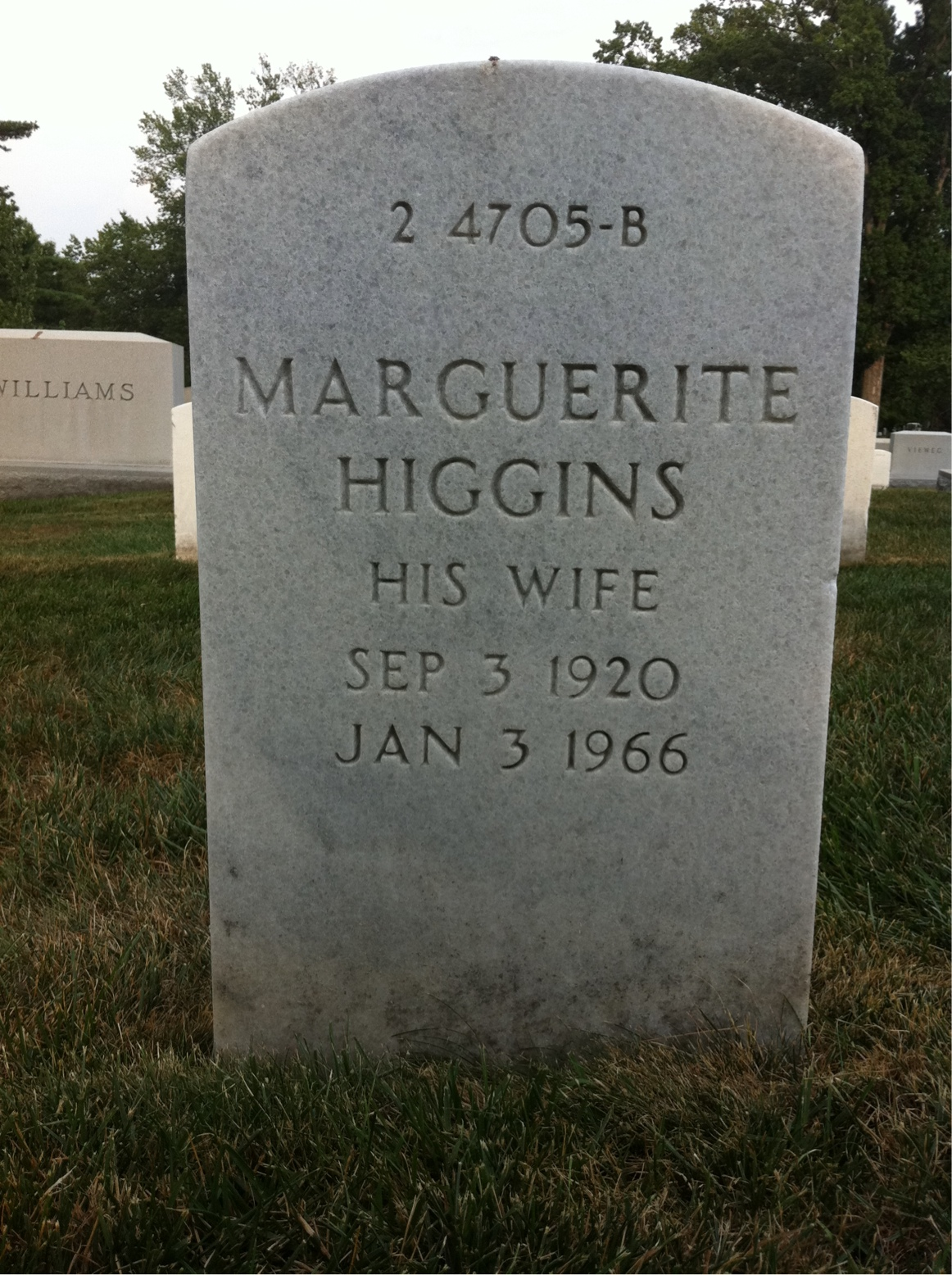
Grave at Arlington next to her husband

When Higgins was six months old, she came down with malaria. A doctor told the family to take her to a mountain resort in present-day Vietnam to recover, which she did. Decades later, Higgins returned from assignment in South Vietnam in November 1965, where Higgins contracted leishmaniasis, a disease that led to her death on January 3, 1966, aged 45, in Washington, D.C. She is interred at Arlington National Cemetery with her husband.

== In popular culture ==
Higgins was played by Megan Fox in the South Korean film The Battle of Jangsari.

In Phil Pisani's book Maggie's Wars, the main character is based on Marguerite Higgins.

In Nathan Hale's graphic novel Cold War Correspondent, a fictionalized version of Marguerite Higgins appears as the narrator.

== Honors ==
Secretary of War Robert P. Patterson honored war correspondents, including Higgins, at an event in Washington, on November 23, 1946.

In 1951, She was awarded the Pulitzer Prize for her reporting of the Inchon Landing, Korean War.

On September 2, 2010, South Korea posthumously awarded Order of Diplomatic Service Merit Heungin Medal (Korean: 수교훈장 흥인장), one of its highest honors, to Marguerite Higgins. In a ceremony in the capital, her daughter and grandson accepted the Heunginjang, a national medal. The award cites Higgins's bravery in publicizing South Korea's struggle for survival in the early 1950s.

In 2016, South Korean Ministry of Patriots and Veterans Affairs awarded Korean War's Heroine of May.

== Books ==
- War In Korea: The Report of a Woman Combat Correspondent. New York: Doubleday & Co. 1951.
- News Is a Singular Thing. New York: Doubleday & Co. 1955.
- Red Plush and Black Bread. New York: Doubleday & Co. 1955.
- Cold War Correspondent: A Korean War Tale, 2021 (Nathan Hale's Hazardous Tales #11)
- Our Vietnam Nightmare: The Story of U.S. Involvement in the Vietnamese Tragedy, with Thoughts on a Future Policy. New York: Harper and Row. 1965. ISBN 978-0-06-011890-7.
