= Emil Mahl =

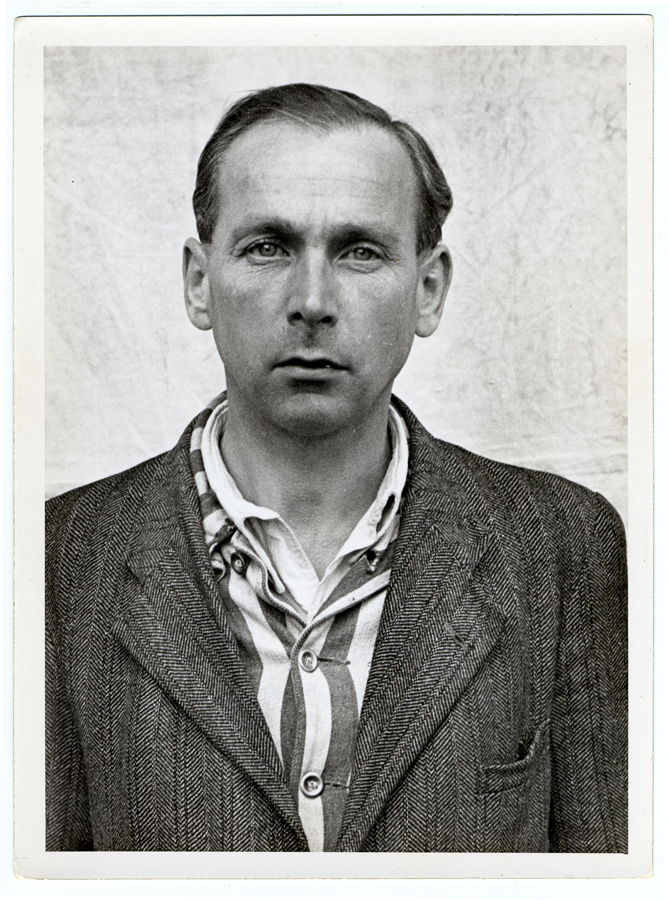
Emil Mahl in American internment. Photograph from 1945.

Emil Erwin Mahl (born 9 November 1899 in Karlsruhe; died 1 April 1967 in Heidelberg) was a Kapo (prisoner functionary) in the crematorium of the Nazi Dachau concentration camp. Known as "the Hangman of Dachau", he was sentenced to death after the war, but this was commuted to a 10-year prison sentence.

== Biography ==
Mahl, divorced and father of one child, was a mechanic by profession. From 1940 to the end of April 1945 he was a prisoner in the Dachau concentration camp as a so-called professional criminal. He was initially deployed there in various work detachments, including a construction detachment and for rubble removal. In addition, he was also a block elder of the penal block in Dachau for a time. From 1943 he worked in the camp crematorium and served there from July 1944 as Kapo under Theodor Heinrich Bongartz until the liberation of the camp at the end of April 1945.

His duties in the crematorium included transporting the corpses to the crematorium and burning them. After the end of the war, Mahl reported that the Jewish prisoners of the crematorium detachment were exchanged from time to time and eliminated as potential witnesses after their work in the crematorium. Two months after his work in the crematorium command, Mahl was also called upon to participate and assist in 800 to 1000 hangings. This earned him the title "Executioner of Dachau". After the end of the war, Mahl testified that Wilhelm Ruppert, Rudolf Heinrich Suttrop, Josef Jarolin, Franz Xaver Trenkle, Wilhelm Wagner, Franz Böttger, Alfred Kramer, Josef Seuss, Johann Viktor Kirsch and Theodor Heinrich Bongartz were present at executions in different compositions.

Of the camp doctors, he named Fritz Hintermayer, Fridolin Karl Puhr and Hans Eisele. Johann Kick is said to have brought the prisoners to the crematorium and Leonhard Anselm Eichberger is said to have been the reporter present. According to him, the executions were carried out by hanging, shooting or poison injections. According to his own statements, Mahl himself was partially kicked by the SS officers present in order to carry out the executions more quickly. He also stated that Trenkle once knocked out his teeth. In the early 1950s, Mahl testified as follows about the execution of the Hitler would-be assassin Georg Elser on April 9, 1945:

"One evening in April [...] the administrator of the crematorium, SS-Oberscharführer Bongartz, came to me in my living room in the New Crematorium. He told me that we (prisoners from the crematorium) were not allowed to go out of the crematorium that evening, but that if we heard gunshots, we should come out immediately with a stretcher. [...] Around 11:00 p.m., Geiger told me that he had heard shooting. I, too, had heard this, and therefore asked Geiger and Ziegler to go out with me on a stretcher. In front of the crematorium, the two hesitated because they were afraid, but then slowly walked with me to a place where an electric flashlight was shining. [...] At the crime scene, I saw a man lying dead on the ground, facing the ground. Next to him stood the administrator Bongartz. [...] At the same time, I saw three men walking away from the small iron door that led into the crematorium grounds. There were, as I am sure I recognized, three SS officers. [...] Elser had a single shot, a shot in the neck, and was already dead when we arrived. In my view, the shot had been fired at close range. We had to carry the Elser immediately to the New Crematorium and then immediately burn it in the oven."

Before the liberation of the camp, Mahl fled to Munich, where he was tracked down and arrested by Michel Thomas, who worked for the Counter Intelligence Corps, at the beginning of May 1945. [4] On November 15, 1945, Mahl was tried by an American military tribunal on charges of war crimes in the Dachau trial, which took place as part of the Dachau Trials. During the trial, Mahl wore the striped concentration camp prisoner clothing. On December 13, 1945, Mahl and 35 other co-defendants were sentenced to death by hanging. In the verdict, participation in executions was taken into account as individual excesses at Mahl. In his defence, Mahl argued that he had been forced to take part in the executions out of fear for his life and that he had only actively taken care of the post in the crematorium for fear of being transferred to another concentration camp. Later, the death sentence was reduced to ten years in prison and then further reduced. Mahl was imprisoned at Landsberg Prison and released from prison in February 1952. He died in 1967.
