= Dachau (disambiguation) =

Dachau may refer to:

- Dachau, Bavaria, a town in Germany
- Dachau Bahnhof, main train station of Dachau
- Dachau (district), a rural district in Bavaria
- Dachau art colony, an early 20th century art colony in Bavaria
- Dachau concentration camp, a World War II Nazi forced-labor camp
- Dachau trials, trials for war crimes held in the former concentration camp
- Dachau (US Army report), a 1945 report on the concentration camp

== See also ==
- Dacha
