= Michel Thomas =

American linguist

- Born: Moniek Kroskof; February 3, 1914; Łódź, Russian Empire
- Died: January 8, 2005 (aged 90); New York City, New York, U.S.
- Occupations: Nazi hunter, linguist, language teacher
- Spouse(s): Christiane Schmidtmer, Alice Burns
- Children: 2

Michel Thomas (born Moniek Kroskof, February 3, 1914 – January 8, 2005) was a polyglot linguist and decorated war veteran. He survived imprisonment in several Nazi concentration camps after serving in the Maquis of the French Resistance and worked with the U.S. Army Counter Intelligence Corps during World War II. After the war, Thomas immigrated to the United States, where he developed a language-teaching system known as the "Michel Thomas method". In 2004, he was awarded the Silver Star by the United States Army.

== Childhood ==
Thomas was born in Łódź, Poland, to a wealthy Jewish family who owned textile factories. When he was seven years old, his parents sent him to Breslau, Germany (now Wrocław, Poland), where he fitted in comfortably. The rise of the Nazis drove him to leave for the University of Bordeaux in France in 1933, and subsequently the Sorbonne and the University of Vienna.

== World War II ==
Thomas's biography gives an account of his war years. When France fell to the Nazis, he lived in Nice, under the Vichy government, changing his name to Michel Thomas so he could operate in the French Resistance movement more easily. He was arrested several times, and finally sent to Camp des Milles, near Aix-en-Provence. In August 1942, Thomas got released from Les Milles using forged papers and made his way to Lyon, where his duties for the Resistance entailed recruiting Jewish refugees into the organization. In January 1943, he was arrested and interrogated by Klaus Barbie, only being released after convincing the Gestapo officer that he was an apolitical French artist. He would later testify at the 1987 trial of Barbie in Lyon.

In February 1943, after being arrested, tortured and subsequently released by the Milice, the Vichy militia (or "French Gestapo"), he joined a commando group in Grenoble and then the U.S. Army Counter Intelligence Corps (CIC), working unpaid as a scout and interpreter. When Dachau was liberated on April 29, 1945, Thomas learned the whereabouts of Emil Mahl (the "hangman of Dachau"), whom Thomas arrested two days later. Thomas, along with CIC colleague Ted Kraus, subsequently captured SS Major Gustav Knittel (wanted for his role in the Malmedy massacre). Thomas also engineered a post-war undercover sting operation that resulted in the arrest of several former SS officers. A 1950 Los Angeles Daily News article credits Thomas with the capture of 2,500 Nazi war criminals.

In the final week of World War II, Thomas was instrumental in rescuing from destruction a cache of Nazi documents that had been shipped by the Gestapo to be pulped at a paper mill in Freimann, Germany. These included the worldwide membership card file of more than ten million members of the Nazi party.

After the end of the war, Thomas learned that his parents and most of his extended family had been murdered in Auschwitz.

== Post-war years ==
In 1947, Thomas immigrated to Los Angeles, where an uncle and cousins resided. He opened a language school in Beverly Hills called the Polyglot Institute (later renamed The Michel Thomas Language Center) and developed a language-teaching system known as the "Michel Thomas Method", which he claimed would allow students to become conversationally proficient after only a few days' study.

He remained unmarried until 1978, when he wedded Los Angeles schoolteacher Alice Burns; the couple had a son and daughter before the marriage ended in divorce.

Thomas's clients included diplomats, industrialists, and celebrities. The success of the school led to tours and a second school in New York City, as well as a series of instructional books and tapes in French, Spanish, German, and Italian. At the time of his death in 2005, Thomas's tapes, CDs, and books were the leading method of recorded language-learning in the United Kingdom.

In 1997, Thomas participated in a BBC television science documentary, The Language Master, in which he taught a five-day course in French to a group of UK sixth form students who had no previous experience with the language. Throughout the course of the five days, the feelings of the students toward the project would radically amend from low esteem prior to the first session to highly confident by the last day.

== Defamation lawsuit, Silver Star ==
In 2001, when the Los Angeles Times published a profile casting doubts about Thomas's war record, he unsuccessfully sued the newspaper for defamation.

In a seemingly contradictory U.S. District Court ruling, Judge Audrey Collins said that although readers of the article might conclude that Thomas lied about his wartime experiences, the newspaper did not actually intend to convey that implication:

"A reasonable reader or juror might conclude, after reading the article and considering the various points of view presented, that Thomas had in fact lied about his past. But no reasonable juror could find that Defendants intended to convey that impression." C.D. Cal., Thomas v. Los Angeles Times.

In 2004, after archival documents and recent testimonials of Thomas's surviving World War II comrades were submitted to the U.S. Army by Senator John McCain and Representative Carolyn Maloney, Thomas was awarded the Silver Star for "gallantry in action against the enemy in France from August to September 1944 while a lieutenant in the French Forces of the Interior attached to the [U.S.] 1st Battalion, 180th Infantry Regiment, 45th Infantry Division." The award was presented by former Senator Robert Dole and Senator John Warner, both decorated WWII veterans, at the National World War II Memorial in Washington, D.C., on May 25, 2004 — the week the Memorial was dedicated.

== Death ==
Thomas died of cardiac failure at his home in New York City on January 8, 2005, aged 90.

== Polyglot linguist ==
Michel Thomas is known to have been fluent in seven tongues: Polish, English, French, Spanish, Italian, German and Yiddish. Some reports state that he could speak another five, but precisely which ones is unclear.

=== Michel Thomas method ===
As a language teacher, Thomas used a specific approach. He proposed that there is no such thing as a student with learning difficulties, only teachers with teaching difficulties. According to Dr. Jonathan Solity of University College London, Thomas held that there are three critical components of the teaching environment:

1. "The first is the analysis of the material to be learned. If the analysis is correct, teaching is easier and the subsequent learning of the pupil ensured."
2. "The second is isolating and structuring the most useful information to teach so that there is a logical progression in the skills, knowledge and concepts taught. Easier skills are taught before more difficult ones and useful information is taught before less useful information. In this context useful information is defined in terms of its generalisability and wider applicability."
3. "The third component of the learning environment is determining the best way of presenting skills, knowledge and concepts to students so that learning is facilitated."

The method presents the target language by interleaving new with old material, teaching generalization from language principles, contextual diversity, and learning self-correction in an environment that attempts to be stress-free, as the teacher is responsible for learning, not the student.

Thomas felt his method would "change the world"; he only started with languages as he felt that it was the most alien thing a person could learn. Solity claims the method "has huge implications for teaching anybody anything".
