= Corpse-like obedience =

German philosophy idea

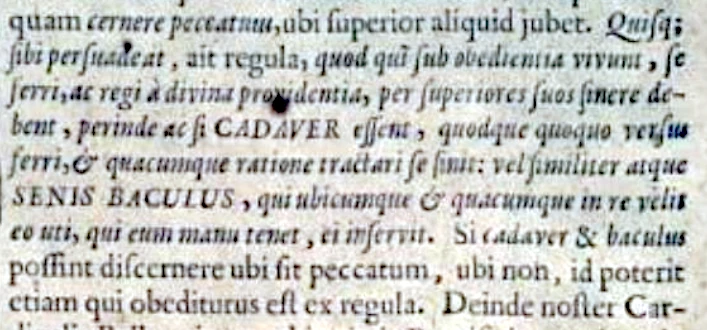
The term originates in the writings of Ignatius of Loyola.

Corpse-like obedience (German: Kadavergehorsam) refers to an obedience in which the obeying person submits unreservedly to another's will, like a mindless, animated cadaver.

It is also translated as corpse obedience or cadaver obedience, or as being cadaver-like, slavish, unquestioning, absolute or blind.

Some scholars have translated the term as zombie-like obedience.

== Jesuit origin ==
The term originated with the Jesuit work by Ignatius of Loyola from 1553, the "Letter on Obedience". It has also been dated to 1558. That text said, in Latin: "Et sibi quisque persuadeat, quod qui sub Obedientia vivunt, se ferri ac regi a divina Providentia per Superiores suos sinere debent perinde, ac si cadaver essent" which can be translated as "We should be aware that each of those who live in obedience must allow himself to be led and guided by Divine Providence through the Superior, as if he were a dead body".

The concept, described in the Jesuit context as "fabled and misunderstood", has since been criticised by detractors of the Jesuit order as blind obedience. Jesuit supporters, in turn, refer to it as the "perfect obedience".

== Modern use ==
The term is often associated with Germany (where it is known as Kadavergehorsam), where it refers to "both obedience and loyalty until death" or simply "absolute obedience" or "blind obedience". It has been associated with the discussion of German military and administration of the Prussian and Nazi eras and their passive adherence to carrying out orders, including those later judged to be war crimes (see also Prussian virtues, German militarism, Befehlsnotstand, Führerprinzip, and superior orders). The Law for the Restoration of the Professional Civil Service of 1933 has been credited with enforcing this idea in the Nazi German civil administration. Adolf Eichmann, one of the major organisers of the Holocaust, invoked this concept in his defence during his post-war trial.

The term has also been used in the context of other totalitarian regimes, such as communist states and parties. The concept has been described as promoted by works such as The Communist Manifesto or Mein Kampf.

The concept has also been mentioned in the context of extreme interpretation of military discipline.

== See also ==
- Desk murderer
- NPC (meme)
- Nuremberg defense
- Respondeat superior
