= Franz Böttger =

German SS-Oberscharführer (1888-1946)

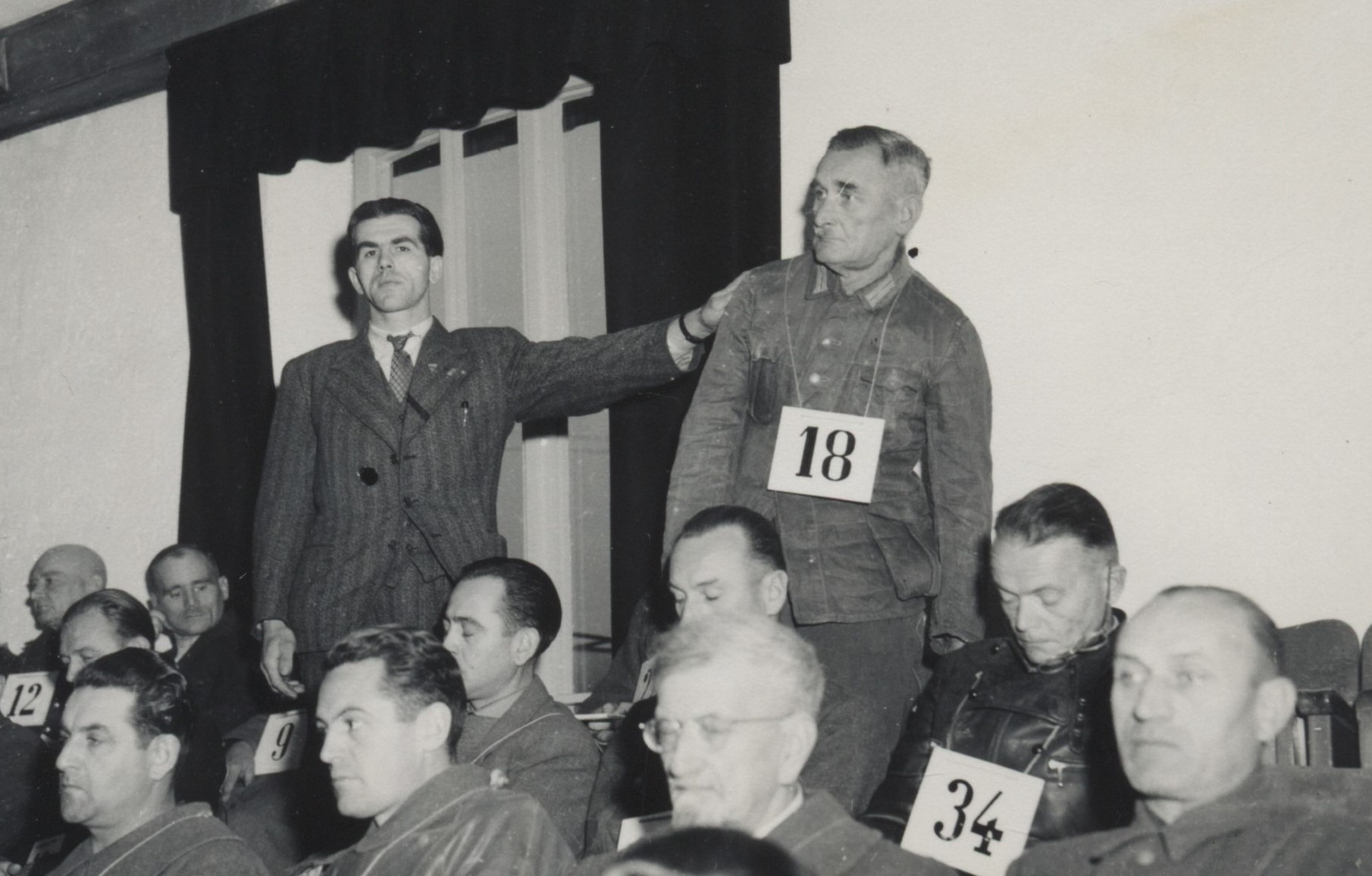
- Michael Pellis (left), a Dachau survivor, identifies Böttger (right)
- Born: 11 July 1888; Munich, Kingdom of Bavaria, German Empire
- Died: 29 May 1946 (aged 57); Landsberg Prison, Landsberg am Lech, Allied-occupied Germany
- Cause of death: Execution by hanging
- Status: Executed
- Motive: Nazism
- Conviction: War crimes
- Trial: Dachau camp trial
- Penalty: Death
- Military career
- Allegiance: Nazi Germany
- Branch: Schutzstaffel
- Service years: until 1945
- Rank: SS-Oberscharführer

Franz Böttger (11 July 1888 – 29 May 1946) was a German SS-Oberscharführer, employed as a supervising officer in the Dachau concentration camp. Following the war, he was tracked down and captured by surviving inmates from the camp. Böttger was convicted of war crimes and sentenced to death. He was executed in 1946. Former prisoners of Dachau had called Böttger "an outstanding example of inhuman cruelty and brutality."

== Personal life ==
Böttger, married and childless, was a sales representative for a firm trading in jewelry and gems in Munich when he was called into military service in 1940; he entered the Dachau concentration camp guards' company in June 1940. By November, he had left the company, but returned in May 1941 as a logistics officer, transferring to the camp administration's postal service in September 1941. He retained this post until December 1943, being responsible for censoring outgoing communications.

From 1 December 1943 onwards, he was employed as "Arbeits- und Rapportführer" (work and duty call supervisor) in the camp's Schutzhaftlager ('protective custody' camp; containing mostly extra- or para-legally rounded-up political opponents and Jews), falling under command of Michaël Redwitz and Wilhelm Ruppert. As such, he was responsible for setting up Arbeitskommandos, duty calls and transports of camp inmates, and supervising executions in the crematoria of the camp.

Böttger was present for the executions of 90 Russian prisoners. During a death march from Dachau in March 1945, Böttger shot a Soviet prisoner who had collapsed from exhaustion. Survivors of the march said that many other inmates died along the way.

On 26 April 1945, Böttger was on the guarding escort of an evacuation transport of 8000 camp inmates towards Tirol, actively guarding a detachment of German prisoners. After the escorting SS guards detached themselves and transferred guard duty to Wehrmacht soldiers, Böttger went to his house in Munich, fleeing by bicycle shortly before the United States Army occupied the city on 30 April 1945. He was apprehended after being sought out and recognized by former Dachau inmates, and transferred to his former workplace, which was now in use as a facility to contain (presumed) Nazi criminals and/or facilitators. During his stay there, he was beaten up by former inmates. He was transferred into U.S. military custody and interned.

On 15 November 1945, Böttger was indicted for committing war crimes before the U.S. military court presiding over the Dachau trials, and was found guilty and sentenced to death by hanging on December, 13th, 1945, along with 35 other defendants. In mitigation, Böttger said he never beat an inmate "to a pulp." This was deemed insufficient to warrant leniency, and he was hanged on 29 May 1946 at Landsberg Prison.

== Literature ==
- Case No. 000-50-2 (US vs. Martin Gottfried Weiss et al.) Tried 13 Dec. 45 (pdf file; 40,9 MB)
- Holger Lessing: Der erste Dachauer Prozess (1945/46). Nomos Verlagsgesellschaft, Baden-Baden 1993, ISBN 3-7890-2933-5
