= Hans Eisele (physician) =

German SS officer and war criminal (1913–1967)

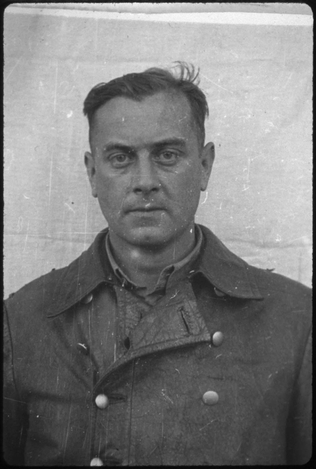
- Hans Kurt Eisele in American internment
- Born: 13 March 1913; Donaueschingen, German Empire
- Died: 3 May 1967 (aged 54); Cairo, Egypt
- Military career
- Allegiance: Nazi Germany
- Branch: Schutzstaffel
- Service years: 1940–1945
- Rank: Hauptsturmführer
- Criminal information
- Conviction: War crimes
- Penalty: Dachau; Death; commuted to life imprisonment Buchenwald; Death; commuted to 10 years' imprisonment

Hans Kurt Eisele (13 March 1913 – 3 May 1967) was a German SS-Hauptsturmführer and concentration camp doctor.

== Personal life ==
The son of a church painter, Eisele came from a modest background. The situation of the family worsened significantly due to inflation of currency during the twenties. After attending the grammar school in Donaueschingen, he studied medicine in Freiburg in 1931. In 1933 he joined both the National Socialist German Worker's Party (member number 3,125,695) and the SS (member number 237,421). He was married and had three children.

== Crimes in the concentration camps ==
In January 1940, Eisele joined the Waffen-SS, where he was first transferred to Sachsenhausen concentration camp as a doctor. He became known there for his extremely positive treatment of prisoners, earning the nickname "The Angel" for helping exhausted prisoners and not mistreating anyone. Eisele then spent a brief period of time in Mauthausen concentration camp. From February to August 1941, Eisele worked in Buchenwald concentration camp. There, his behavior changed for the worse. Eisele became known as "The Butcher". He served as a camp doctor, and murdered at least 200 Jews suffering from tuberculosis. He also performed experimental surgery, sometimes without anaesthesia and/or with fatal outcome; in addition, he abused and tortured patients. After transferring to Natzweiler concentration camp, he joined the SS hospital in Prague in June 1942. He subsequently transferred to the SS Division Das Reich on the Eastern Front for military duty. In February 1945, he was sent to Dachau concentration camp, where he served under the First Camp Physician Fritz Hintermayer. He was arrested by U.S. forces in April 1945.

== Trials and punishment ==
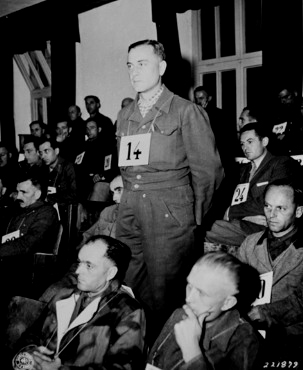
Eisele (#14) listens to an account of his crimes at the Dachau camp trial

On 13 December 1945, Eisele and 39 others were tried in the Dachau main trial for atrocities in Dachau. Eisele was convicted of his complicity in three executions, for which he had issued the death certificates afterwards. He was sentenced to death. However, after a mandatory review of his case and those of his codefendants, Eisele's death sentence was one of 8 out of 36 which were reduced to prison terms on appeal. The reasoning for sparing Eisele was that the military could not find evidence of him individually mistreating prisoners. In addition, medical care in the camp under his purview had improved somewhat, and he had barely spent any time in Dachau whatsoever.

On 11 April 1947, Eisele was tried in the Buchenwald main trial. He was found guilty and received another death sentence for complicity to murder and alleged human experimentation. However, the basic conviction against Eisele proved dubious and uncertain (much of what is now known about Eisele was then unavailable), so four of the eight military judges submitted an application that the judgment be converted by the reviewing body to a ten-year sentence, which was granted.

During his detention in prison for war criminals Landsberg, he wrote an extensive defense titled Audiatur et altera pars in which he denied the allegations and represented himself as a convinced Christian, who had always been a physician only for the sake of others. In contrast, numerous witnesses of his crimes were former concentration camp prisoners, and sometimes even former SS members. But after his sentence was reduced to 10 years, Eisele, on 26 February 1952, was released from prison.

== Postwar career and escape to Egypt ==
After his release, he opened a medical practice in Munich. In 1958, during the course of the trial of Martin Sommer, a guard at Buchenwald, new allegations were made against Eisele. That he had murdered at least 200 Jews and performed gruesome medical experiments came to light. Eisele fled to Egypt with the help of an SS underground group, where he settled under the pseudonym Carl Debouche in upmarket Cairo suburb Maadi. In July 1958, Eisele was arrested by police in Cairo. However, before he could be extradited, he disappeared from custody the following month.

Eisele moved in the circles of former Nazi scientists in Egypt, after a German extradition request had been rejected. The Mossad tried to assassinate Eisele with a mail bomb on 25 September 1963. However, the bomb detonated early, instead killing a postal worker. Eisele died on 3 May 1967 and was buried in the small German cemetery in grave No. 99.

== Bibliography ==
- Ernst Klee: Das Personenlexikon zum Dritten Reich: Wer war was vor und nach 1945. Fischer, Frankfurt am Main 2007, ISBN 978-3-596-16048-8.
- Ernst Klee: Auschwitz, die NS-Medizin und ihre Opfer. 3rd edition. Fischer, Frankfurt am Main 1997, ISBN 3-596-14906-1.
- Holger Lessing: Der erste Dachauer Prozess (1945/46). Nomos, Baden-Baden 1993, ISBN 3-7890-2933-5.
- Case No. 000-50-2 (US vs. Martin Gottfried Weiss et al) Tried December 13, 1945
- Eichmüller, Andreas (2012). Keine Generalamnestie: die strafrechtliche Verfolgung von NS-Verbrechen in der frühen Bundesrepublik. Oldenbourg Verlag. p. 182. ISBN 978-3-486-70412-9.
- Harold Marcuse: Legacies of Dachau: The Uses and Abuses of a Concentration Camp, 1933-2001
- Buchenwald Concentration Camp, 1937-1945: A Guide to the Permanent Historical Exhibition: Wallstein Verlag, 2004.
- Devin O. Pendas: "The Frankfurt Auschwitz Trial, 1963-1965: Genocide, History, and the Limits of the Law" Cambridge University Press, Nov 7, 2005.
