= Edgar Kupfer-Koberwitz =

German journalist, author and concentration camp survivor

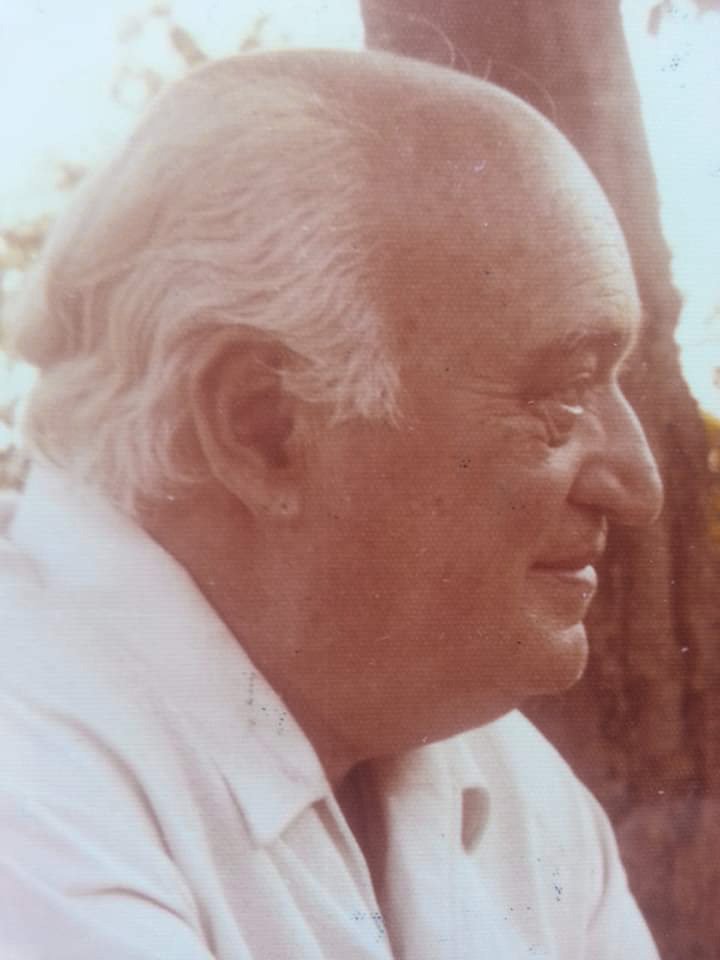
- Born: Edgar Kupfer; 24 April 1906; Kobierzyce
- Died: 7 July 1991 (aged 85); Near Stuttgart

Edgar Kupfer-Koberwitz (24 April 1906 – 7 July 1991) was a German journalist, poet and prisoner in the Dachau concentration camp. He was the author of the Dachau Diaries, in which he describes the events in the concentration camp, the SS Camp and the prisoner society.

== Early life ==
He was born Edgar Kupfer in 1906, the son of an estate manager. He first worked in agriculture and later as an office worker after completing secondary school. He also wrote poetry and newspaper articles on the side. He later took the pen name Kupfer-Koberwitz .

After Adolf Hitler's rise to power he fled to Paris in 1934, where he got a job as a hand weaver. From 1937 he worked for a travel company on the Italian island of Ischia. In September 1940 he was expelled from Italy to Innsbruck for disparaging the Nazi regime and Italian fascism.

== Dachau Diaries ==
On 11 November 1940 Kupfer-Koberwitz was committed to Dachau concentration camp by the Gestapo and from November 1942 was a clerk in a Dachau satellite camp that provided slave labor for the Präzifix Screw Factory , an armaments industry. During this time, at risk to his life, from 20 November 1942 to 2 May 1945 he wrote the manuscript known as the Dachau Diaries, which would ultimately run to 1800 pages. While writing it within the camp, he hid it in various locations and finally buried it in October 1944, wrapped in layers of aluminum, fabric and oil cloth to help preserve it.

Kupfer-Koberwitz led American forces to the location of his diaries a week after they had liberated the Dachau camp on 29 April 1945. The diary, although damp, had largely survived. Two years later it would be used as evidence during the Nuremberg Trials.

== Post-war ==
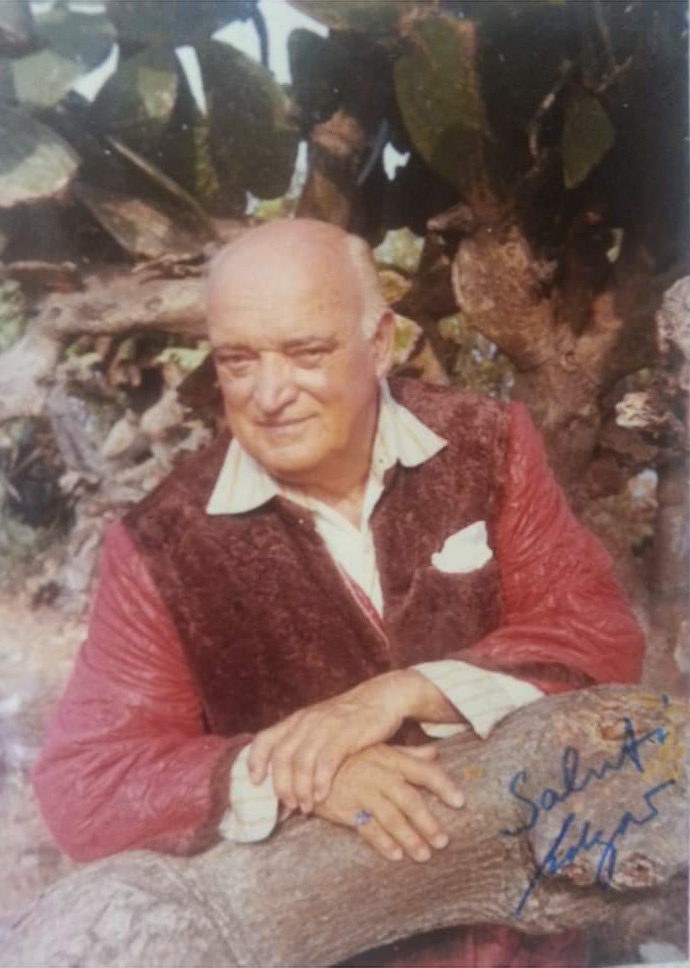
Edgar Kupfer-Koberwitz in Sardinia, about 1972

In the course of the liberation of Dachau he was released at the end of April 1945.

After the liberation he lived in the USA until the end of the 1950s, and from 1960 on Sardinia in the village San Teodoro. In 1986 he returned to Germany , first living with friends and finally in an anthroposophical nursing home near Stuttgart.

Kupfer-Koberwitz was the author of several books. The Dachau Diaries are now kept at the University of Chicago Library. In addition to publications on the Dachau concentration camp and the island of Ischia, in 1947, as a staunch vegan, he wrote Die Tierbrüder - a reflection on ethical life, a passionate appeal against indifferent and cruel treatment of animals. He believed that he had "suffered so much myself that I can feel other creatures' suffering by virtue of my own". He further wrote, "I believe as long as man tortures and kills animals, he will torture and kill humans as well—and wars will be waged—for killing must be practiced and learned on a small scale".

== Works (selection) ==
- Life - Hell! , Stuttgart 1931
- Die Tierbrüder , Man-Verlag, Augsburg 1947
- Chain of Days: Poems from Dachau , Hatje, Stuttgart 1947
- The forgotten island: A book about the volcanic island of Ischia , Wolff, Flensburg 1948
- The powerful and the helpless: As prisoners in Dachau , Vorwerk, Stuttgart (vol. 1. How it began 1957, vol. 2. How it ended 1960)
- Dachau diaries: The records of the prisoner 24814 , Kindler, Munich 1997, ISBN 3-463-40301-3.
