= Engelbert Valentin Niedermeyer =

SS operative

Engelbert Valentin Niedermeyer (26 December 1911 – 28 May 1946) was an SS operative with the position of block leader in the Dachau concentration camp. After being tried and convicted in a court of law, and with special consideration given to his treatment of the inmates, on 13 December 1945, he was sentenced to die by hanging. Following due process, the sentence was carried out on 28 May 1946, in Landsberg, Germany. The execution was filmed by U.S. military personnel, who recorded Niedermeyer's hanging, along with a coffin marked "Niedermeyer Engelbert."
