= Ludwig Eiber =

German historian and author

Ludwig Eiber (born 1945) is a German historian and author. He is widely acknowledged as an expert on the post-World War II Allied war crimes trials of the Nazis. In particular, he has expertise in the Dachau trials.

== Biography ==
Eiber studied History at LMU Munich and received his doctorate there in 1978 with his dissertation on the experience of slave workers under the Nazi regime. In particular, he focused on the experience of textile and porcelain workers in the northeastern Upper Franconia, 1933–1939. Then he was at the Institute of Contemporary History.

From 1980 to 1988, he headed the Neuengamme concentration camp memorial. He then did research until 1991 at the Hamburg Foundation for Social History of the 20th century, on the Hamburg workers' resistance (1933-1939) and in connection to Leibniz University Hannover and the emigration of Social Democrats to Great Britain (1940-1945).

From 1996, he was a research associate at the House of Bavarian History and completed his Habilitation in 1997 at the University of Hamburg: Arbeiter und Arbeiterbewegung in der Hansestadt Hamburg in den Jahren 1929–1939: Werftarbeiter, Hafenarbeiter und Seeleute; Konformität, Opposition, Widerstand. From 1998 to 2003, he was project leader in the revision of the exhibition at the Dachau Concentration Camp. In addition, he served as Associate Professor of Modern and Contemporary History at the Faculty of Philology and History from 2000 at the University of Augsburg. In 2004, he took over the management of the House of Bavarian History project.

From 2005, he prepared the national exhibition in Zwiesel for 2007. He retired in 2010, and resides in Giesing, a Munich suburb.

== Works ==
Eiber has published the following:

=== Monographs ===
- Ich wußte es wird schlimm". Die Verfolgung der Sinti und Roma in München 1933–1945, Buchendorfer Verlag, München 1993; ISBN 3-927984-16-7.
- Die Sozialdemokratie in der Emigration. Die "Union deutscher sozialistischer Organisationen in Großbritannien" 1941–46 und ihre Mitglieder. Protokolle, Erklärungen, Materialien, Dietz, Bonn 1997, ISBN 3-8012-4084-3.
- Arbeiter und Arbeiterbewegung in der Hansestadt Hamburg in den Jahren 1929 bis 1939. Werftarbeiter, Hafenarbeiter und Seeleute: Konformität, Opposition, Widerstand, Lang, Frankfurt/M. u.a. 2000, ISBN 3-631-31727-1.

=== Edited works ===
- Acht Stunden sind kein Tag. Geschichte der Gewerkschaften in Bayern. Katalog zur Wanderausstellung 1997/98 des Hauses der Bayerischen Geschichte in Zusammenarbeit mit dem Deutschen Gewerkschaftsbund - Landesbezirk Bayern, Augsburg 1997 (zusammen mit Rainhard Riepertinger und Evamaria Brockhoff).
- Räume – Medien – Pädagogik. Kolloquium zur Neugestaltung der KZ-Gedenkstätte Dachau, Augsburg 1999 (zusammen mit Stanislav Zámečník und Evamaria Brockhoff).

=== Articles and collections ===
- KZ-Außenlager in München, in: Didaktische Arbeit in KZ-Gedenkstätten. Erfahrungen und Perspektiven, hrsg. v. d. Bayer. Landeszentrale f. polit. Bildungsarbeit, München 1993, S. 43–57 (in ergänzter Form auch in: Dachauer Hefte 16 (1996) H. 12, S. 58–80).
- Unter Führung des NSDAP-Gauleiters. Die Hamburger Staatspolizei (1933–1937) in: Gerhard Paul, Michael Mallmann (Hrsg.), Die Gestapo - Mythos und Realität, Darmstadt 1995, S. 101–117.
- Liebe und Tod. Frauen und Deserteure, in: Marlis Buchholz/Claus Füllberg-Stolberg/Hans-Dieter Schmid (Hrsg.), Nationalsozialismus und Region, Bielefeld 1996, S. 241–257.
- Verfolgung (KZ, Repressionsapparat), in: Wolfgang Benz/Hermann Graml/Hermann Weiß (Hrsg.), Lexikon des Nationalsozialismus, Stuttgart 1997

== Sources ==
- Ludwig Eiber, Robert Sigl (Hrsg.): Dachauer Prozesse – NS-Verbrechen vor amerikanischen Militärgerichten in Dachau 1945–1948. Wallstein, Göttingen 2007, ISBN 978-3-8353-0167-2. (Anhang: Autorinnen und Autoren, S. 313)
- Gerhard Paul und Klaus-Michael Mallmann (Hrsg.): Die Gestapo. Mythos und Realität, Wissenschaftliche Buchgesellschaft, Darmstadt 1995, ISBN 3-89678-482-X. (Anhang: Die Autoren, S. 583)
