= Claus Schilling =

German tropical medicine specialist, war criminal

Claus Karl Schilling
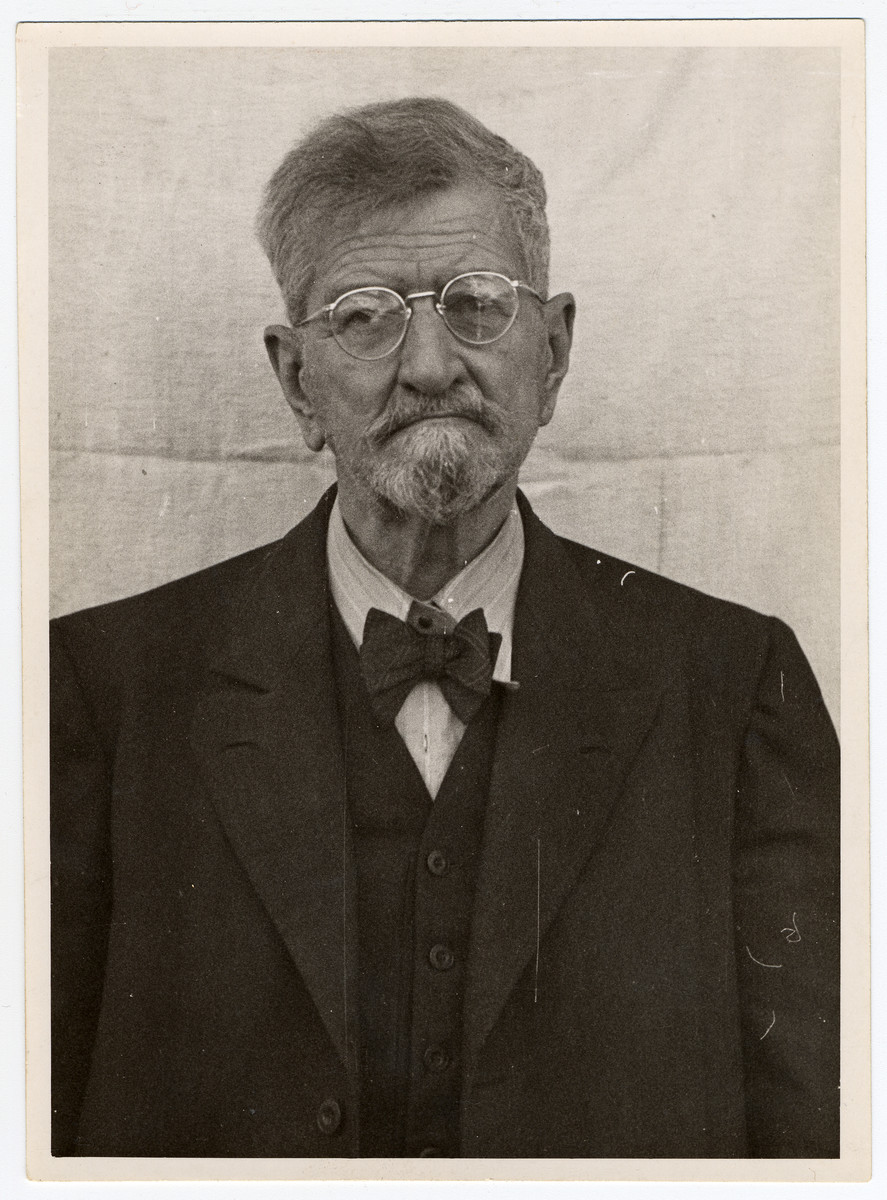
- Claus Schilling in U.S. custody (1945)
- Born: 5 July 1871; Munich, Kingdom of Bavaria, German Empire
- Died: 28 May 1946 (aged 74); Landsberg Prison, Allied-occupied Germany
- Occupations: Tropical medicine, medical research
- Status: Executed by hanging
- Motive: Malaria research
- Conviction: War crimes
- Trial: Dachau camp trial
- Penalty: Death

Details
- Victims: ~300–400+
- Span of crimes: 1938–1945
- Country: Germany and Italy
- Locations: Italian psychiatric hospitals Dachau concentration camp

Claus Karl Schilling (5 July 1871 – 28 May 1946), also recorded as Klaus Schilling, was a German tropical medicine specialist who participated in the Nazi human experiments at the Dachau concentration camp during World War II.

Though never a member of the Nazi Party and a recognized researcher at the Robert Koch Institute before the war, Schilling participated in unethical and inhumane experiments on captive human subjects under both Fascist Italy and Nazi Germany. From 1942 to 1945, Schilling's research on malaria and attempts at fighting it using synthetic drugs culminated in human experimentation on over a thousand camp prisoners at Dachau, of whom hundreds died.

Sentenced to death by hanging at the Dachau camp trial after the fall of Hitler's Germany, he was executed for his crimes against the Dachau prisoners in 1946.

== Biography ==
Born in Munich, the capital of the Kingdom of Bavaria on 5 July 1871, Schilling studied medicine in his native city, receiving a doctor's degree there in 1895. He was a professor of parasitology at the University of Berlin and a member of Malaria Commission of the League of Nations. Within a few years, Schilling was practicing in the German colonial possessions in Africa. Recognized for his contributions in the field of tropical medicine, he was appointed the first-ever director of the tropical medicine division of the Robert Koch Institute in 1905, where he would remain for the subsequent three decades.

=== Italian research ===
Upon retirement from the Robert Koch Institute in 1936, Schilling moved to Benito Mussolini's Fascist Italy, where he was given the opportunity to conduct immunization experiments on inmates of the psychiatric asylums of Volterra and San Niccolò di Siena. (The Italian authorities were concerned that troops faced malaria outbreaks in the course of the Italo-Ethiopian War.) As Schilling stressed the significance of the research for German interests, the Nazi government of Germany also supported him with a financial grant for his Italian experimentation.

=== Dachau experiments ===
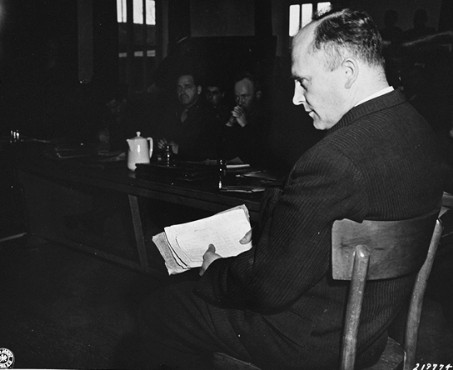
Czech priest, Friedrich Hoffman, testifies at the trial of former camp personnel and prisoners from Dachau concentration camp. In his hand he holds records showing that hundreds of priests died at the camp after being exposed to malaria during Nazi medical experiments.

Schilling returned to Germany after a meeting with Leonardo Conti, the Nazis' health chief, in 1941, and by early 1942, he was provided with a special malaria research station at Dachau's concentration camp by Heinrich Himmler, the leader of the SS. Despite negative assessments from colleagues, Schilling would remain in charge of the malaria station for the duration of the war.

Although Schilling stressed that the research could be done in a harmless manner, test subjects in Dachau were subject to sadistic treatment. They included confining their hands and arms in cages filled with malaria mosquitoes. Afterwards, they were treated with synthetic drugs, at doses ranging from high to lethal. Of the more than 1,000 prisoners used in the malaria experiments at Dachau during the war, between 300 and 400 died as a result; among survivors, a substantial number remained permanently injured. A number of priests imprisoned by the Nazis were killed during the experiments.

In the course of the Dachau Trials following the liberation of the camp at the close of the war, Schilling was tried by a U.S. General Military Court, appointed at 2 November 1945, in the case of The United States versus Martin Gottfried Weiss, Wilhelm Rupert, et al. The defendants, 40 doctors and staff, were charged and convicted of offenses of the violations of laws and usages of war in that they acted in pursuance of a common design, did encourage, aid, abet, and participate in the subjection of Allied nationals and prisoners of war to cruelties and mistreatments at Dachau Concentration Camp and its subcamps. According to the testimony of August H. Vieweg, the patients used in the malaria experiments were Poles, Russians, and Yugoslavs. At that time, there was no formal code of ethics in medical research to which the judges could hold the accused Nazi doctors accountable. The "scientific experiments" exposed during the trials led to the Nuremberg Code, developed in 1949 as a ten-point code of human experimentation ethics.

During his trial, Schilling made a plea in English. Breaking down in tears at the end, he pleaded with the court to let him finish his research, albeit in a less destructive manner:

"I have worked out this great labor. It would be really a terrible loss if I could not finish this work. I don't ask you as a court, I ask you personally to do what you can; to do what you can to help me that I may finish this report. I need only a table and a chair and a typewriter. It would be an enormous help for science, for my colleagues, and a good part to rehabilitate myself."

The tribunal condemned Schilling to death by hanging on 13 December 1945. Following his conviction, Schilling asked his lawyer not to appeal on his behalf, saying he would rather die than stay in prison. However, many in the German medical community protested on his behalf, calling him an honest and humane scientist. Nevertheless, Schilling's sentence was confirmed, and his execution took place at Landsberg Prison in Landsberg am Lech on 28 May 1946. The execution was filmed by military personnel, who recorded Schilling's ascending the gallows and his hanging, along with a coffin marked "Dr Schilling, Claus."

When asked if he wanted to make a final statement, Schilling said, "I am not guilty. Please get it over with."
