= Befehlsnotstand =

German legal term

Befehlsnotstand (English: Necessity to obey orders) is a German legal term that refers to a situation in which a certain action is ordered that violates law, but where the refusal to carry out such an order would lead to drastic consequences, specifically danger to life or body, for the person refusing to carry out the order.

The concept of Befehlsnotstand was successfully used as a defense in World War II-related war crimes trials in Germany in the 1950s and 1960s but research into the subject since has proven that Befehlsnotstand as such did not exist, meaning German soldiers of the Wehrmacht or Schutzstaffel did not actually face drastic consequences if refusing such an order during the war. Refusing a lawful order did however result in consequences, with 23,000 German soldiers executed for refusing orders.

== Etymology ==
Befehlsnotstand is a compound word, made up of the German words Befehl (command or order) and Notstand (emergency). The term has been translated into English by various sources as "necessity to obey order", "a compulsion to obey orders" or "crisis created as a result of following orders".

Notstand in German law can be compared to necessity in the criminal law of other nations.

== Germany ==
=== Background ===
In German law, the situation Befehlsnotstand arises when a person refusing to carry out an unlawful order faces drastic consequences for the refusal. In such a situation, the person could not be prosecuted for carrying out the order. Drastic consequences, in German military law, are defined as a danger to life or body, and are not defined as loss of rank, incarceration or removal to a penal unit, such as a Strafbataillon.

=== Nazi Germany ===
The term is commonly, but not exclusively, associated with German war crimes and the Holocaust during World War II, following which Befehlsnotstand was used as line of defense by the accused in post-war trials. In the 1950s and 1960s the use of Befehlsnotstand as a defense in war crimes trials in Germany was quite successful as it generally protected the accused from punishment. With the formation of the Central Office of the State Justice Administrations for the Investigation of National Socialist Crimes, this changed after historical research by the organisation regarding Einsatzgruppen of the Sicherheitsdienst or concentration camp personnel revealed that no known case could be cited where refusing an order did indeed result in severe punishment. More commonly, military personnel refusing such an order were transferred to a different unit. An example for this was Wehrmacht Captain Otto Freyer, who was transferred towards the end of the war to the Neuengamme concentration camp. Freyer was deemed too soft for his role, which included supervision of executions and commanding a sub-camp at Kaltenkirchen, and he was eventually transferred again at his own request.

In practice, refusing a superior order to participate in war crimes by German soldiers almost never led to dire consequences for the refusing person, and punishment, if any, was relatively mild. It usually resulted in degradation and being sent to serve with fighting units at the front. German historian Sven Felix Kellerhoff argued that, instead of fear of punishment the participants were more afraid of peer pressure and the possibility of exclusion from their group.

Kellerhoff further argued that the situation of Einsatzgruppen members taking part in massacres did not even constitute the lesser Putativnotstand, a state where the individual mistakenly believes their life is in danger if the order is disobeyed when, in reality, no such danger exists.

Manfred Oldenburg, in his book Ideology and Military Calculation, stated that there are no known cases where the refusal to participate in an execution of civilians has led to drastic consequences for soldiers of the Wehrmacht or SS. German soldiers did however face drastic consequences if refusing legal orders during the war. One and a half million German soldiers were sentenced to imprisonment for refusing to follow an order and 30,000 were sentenced to death, of whom 23,000 were executed.

=== East Germany ===
Befehlsnotstand was also used, as well as the Nuremberg defense, by former East German border guards, tried after the German reunification in the Mauerschützenprozesse, the trials of East German borders guards accused of unlawful killings of escapees at the Berlin Wall and the Inner German border as part of the Schießbefehl. In an interview with journalist John O. Koehler, former Stasi political prisoner Werner Juretzko commented resignedly about the leniency the post-1989 German legal system has shown to East Germans guilty of crimes against humanity, "I guess the Germans have lost their balls."

=== Current German law ===
In current German law, articles § 34 and § 35 of the German penal code, the Strafgesetzbuch, govern the law on Notstand. Formerly it was governed by articles § 52 and 54.

Article 34 deals with Rechtfertigender Notstand, necessity as justification, while article 35 deals with Entschuldigender Notstand, necessity as excuse.

== In other countries ==
=== Argentina ===
The Law of Due Obedience (Spanish: Ley de obediencia debida), a law passed by the National Congress of Argentina after the end of the military dictatorship, translated in German as the Befehlsnotstandsgesetz (Gesetz meaning law in German), protected all officers and their subordinates of the armed forces and security forces from prosecution for most crimes committed during the dictatorship but was eventually annulled in 2005.

== See also ==
- Corpse-like obedience (Kadavergehorsam)
- Führerprinzip
- Radbruch formula
