= Wilhelm Ruppert =

German SS officer (1905–1946)

Friedrich Wilhelm Ruppert
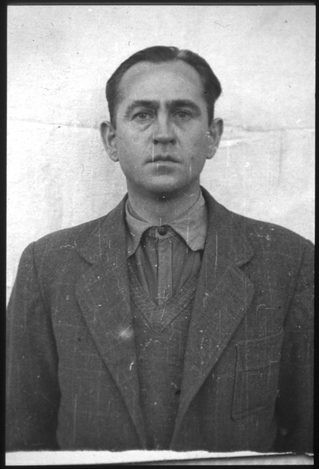
- Ruppert in U.S. custody (1945)
- Born: February 2, 1905; Frankenthal, German Empire
- Died: May 28, 1946 (aged 41); Landsberg Prison, Allied-occupied Germany
- Political party: Nazi Party
- Status: Executed by hanging
- Motive: Nazism
- Conviction: War crimes
- Trial: Dachau camp trial
- Penalty: Death

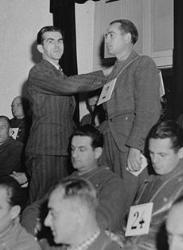
Michael Pellis, a former inmate at Dachau, identifies former SS-Obersturmführer Friedrich Wilhelm Ruppert as the man responsible for selection at Dachau

Friedrich Wilhelm Ruppert (February 2, 1905 – May 28, 1946) was an SS-TV Obersturmbannführer (paramilitary rank equivalent to lieutenant colonel) in charge of executions at Dachau concentration camp; he was, along with others, responsible for the executions of captured British SOE agents Noor Inayat Khan, Madeleine Damerment, Eliane Plewman, and Yolande Beekman.

== Concentration camps ==
Starting on April 11, 1933, Ruppert, married and the father of a child, was one of the first guards at Dachau concentration camp. He initially worked as a camp electrician. On September 18, 1942 he was transferred to the Majdanek concentration camp in Lublin. There he was the technical director of the camp administration. Ruppert was a witness to Operation Harvest Festival at Majdanek in November 1943, the mass murder of 43,000 Jews.

In May 1944, Ruppert was a warehouse manager in the Warsaw concentration camp until its evacuation. He returned to the Dachau concentration camp on August 6, 1944, serving under camp commandant Eduard Weiter. Ruppert was responsible for the operation of the camp. On April 23, 1945, he was replaced by Max Schobert.

Ruppert accompanied the death march of the prisoners in April 1945. The march went over Pasing, Wolfratshausen, Bad Tölz to Tegernsee and ended on April 30. He was arrested by American troops in Tegernsee.

== War crimes ==
Wilhelm Ruppert was tried for war crimes after the war. Multiple witnesses identified him at the trial and said he selected prisoners for execution. An eye-witness said that he executed Special Operations Executive agent Noor Inayat Khan. Evidence showed that he had presided over the executions of at least 90 Russian prisoners. Ruppert was called a man who had no empathy for his victims, whom he frequently whipped. Ruppert was convicted of war crimes, sentenced to death, and hanged at Landsberg Prison on May 28, 1946.

== Bibliography ==
- Holger Lessing: Der erste Dachauer Prozess (1945/46). Nomos, Baden-Baden 1993, ISBN 3-7890-2933-5.
- Ernst Klee: Das Personenlexikon zum Dritten Reich: Wer war was vor und nach 1945. Nicol-Verlagsgesellschaft mbH & Co KG Hamburg, Hamburg 2021 (5th edition), ISBN 978-3-86820-311-0.
- Case No. 000-50-2 (US vs. Martin Gottfried Weiss et al.) Tried 13 Dec. 45 in eng. Sprache (pdf-datei; 40,9 MB)
