= Henry DeWitt Hamilton =

American lawyer

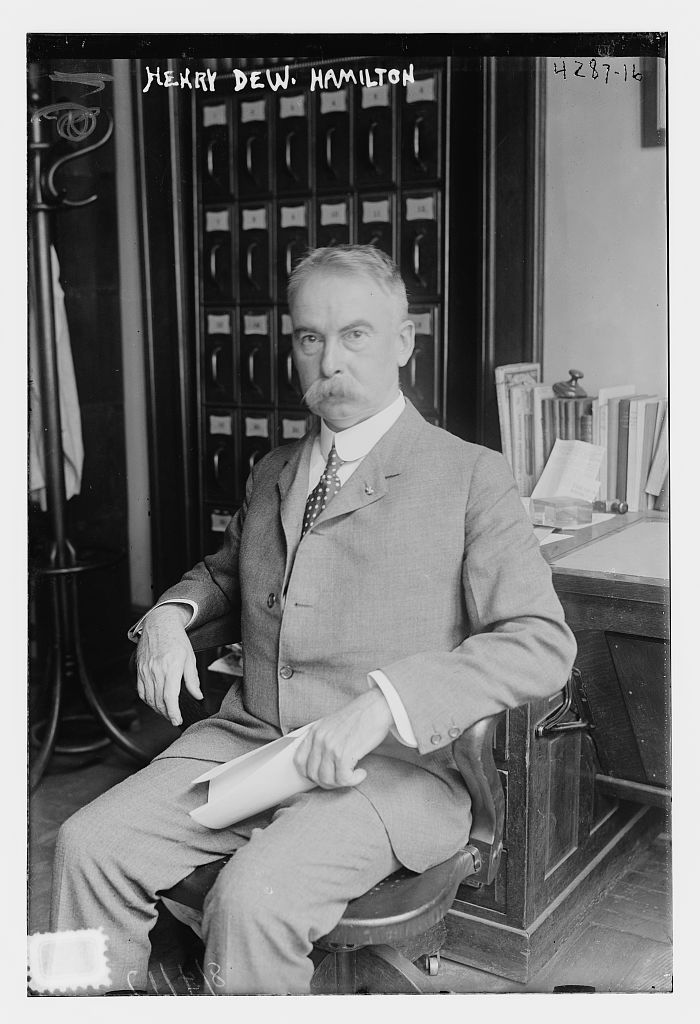

Adjutant General of the New York State Militia
- In office 1912–1914
- Appointed by: William Sulzer

Personal details
- Born: February 26, 1863 White Hall, Illinois, US
- Died: August 18, 1942 (aged 79) Barrington, Rhode Island, US
- Resting place: Arlington National Cemetery
- Spouse: Ada Estelle Brown
- Parent(s): Edwin Benjamin Brown Hamilton; Mary Ann Hildred Chandler
- Education: Shurtleff College; Columbia University (J.D., 1884)

Major General Henry DeWitt Hamilton (February 26, 1863 - August 18, 1942) was the Adjutant General of New York starting in 1912.

== Biography ==
He was born on February 26, 1863, in White Hall, Illinois, to Edwin Benjamin Brown Hamilton (1821-1894) and Mary Ann Hildred Chandler. He attended Shurtleff College and Columbia University and was admitted to the bar in New York in 1884. On June 30, 1893, in Newark, New Jersey, he married Ada Estelle Brown.

He was the Adjutant General of New York starting in 1912. In 1915, he was succeeded by Louis W. Stotesbury. In 1923 he was appointed as the secretary of the Rhode Island Democratic Committee.

He died on August 18, 1942, in Barrington, Rhode Island. He was buried in Arlington National Cemetery.
