= Anthony P. German =

Adjutant General of New York (2016–2018)

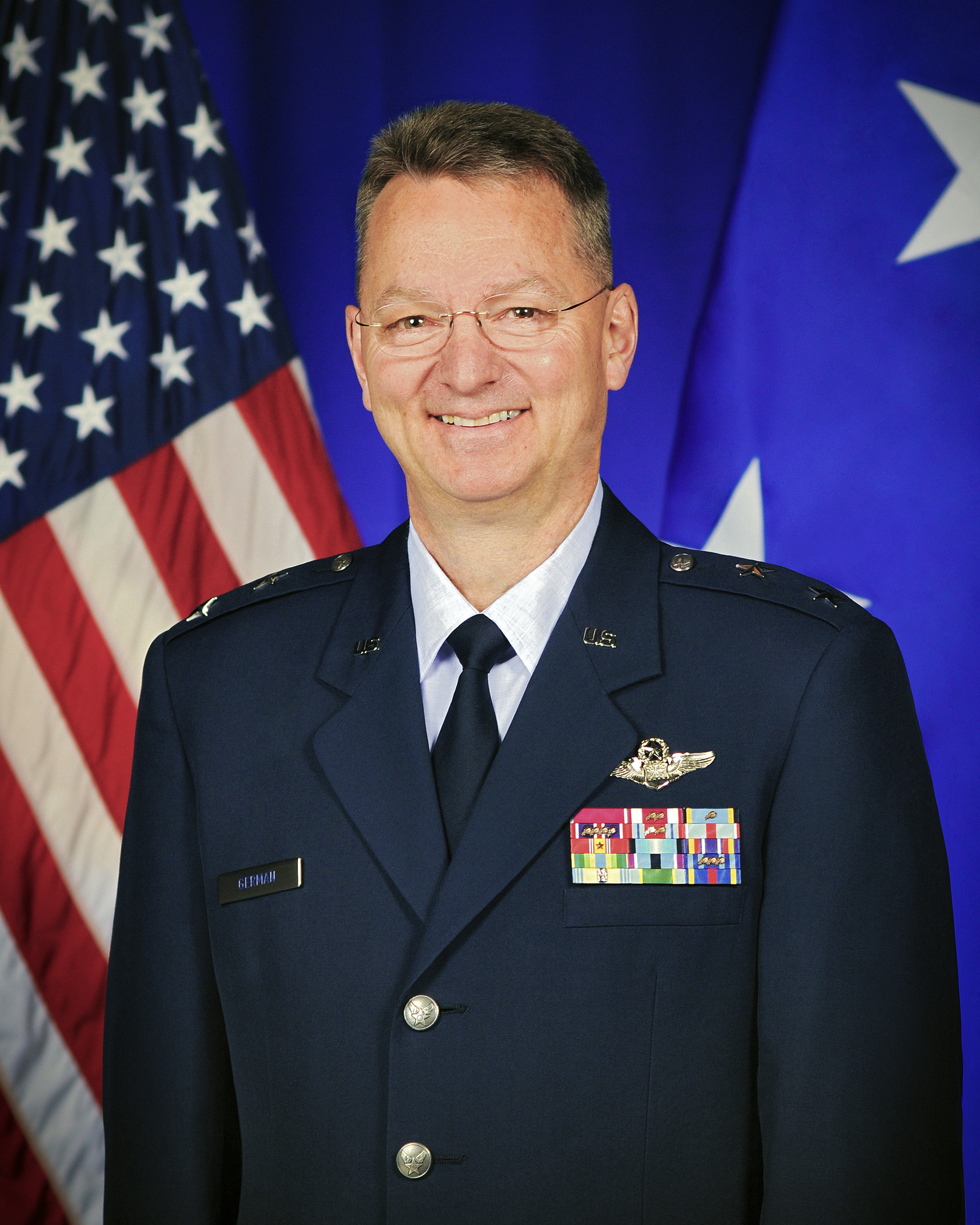
- German in 2016
- Born: 1959 (age 66–67); Augsburg, Germany
- Education: State University of New York at Cobleskill; State University of New York at Oneonta; Air Command and Staff College; Naval War College
- Spouse: Diana M. Vigna
- Children: 4
- Military career
- Service: United States Air Force
- Service years: 1983–2019
- Rank: Major General
- Unit: New York Air National Guard
- Commands: 109th Airlift Wing; New York Air National Guard; Adjutant General of New York; Air National Guard (acting)
- Conflicts: Global War on Terrorism
- Awards: Air Force Distinguished Service Medal; Legion of Merit; Meritorious Service Medal (3); Complete List
- Other work: Director, Christchurch Operations, Office of Polar Programs, National Science Foundation

Anthony P. German (born 1959) is a retired American military officer. A career member of the United States Air Force, he served from 1983 until 2019, and was a member of the New York Air National Guard from 1989 until his retirement. German's commands included the 109th Airlift Wing, New York Air National Guard, and Adjutant General of New York. Near the end of his career, he served briefly as acting director of the Air National Guard. His awards included the Air Force Distinguished Service Medal, Legion of Merit, and three awards of the Meritorious Service Medal.

German was born in Germany while his father served in the United States Army, and he was raised in Roxbury, New York. He received an associate degree from the State University of New York at Cobleskill in 1979 and a bachelor's degree from the State University of New York at Oneonta in 1981. He joined the United States Air Force in 1982, and received his commission as a second lieutenant in 1983. German was trained as a navigator on the C-130 Military Transport Aircraft. He remained with the Air Force until 1987, after which he was a member of the inactive reserve. He worked as an accountant in Oneonta, New York, and joined the New York Air National Guard in 1989. German served with the 109th Airlift Wing, which specializes in missions in Antarctica, and advanced to command of the wing from 2006 to 2020.

As a general officer beginning in 2010, German served as the New York Air National Guard's (NYANG) chief of staff, assistant adjutant general and commander of the NYANG, and Adjutant General of New York from 2016 to 2018. From 2018 until retiring in 2019, German was a special assistant to the director of the Air National Guard, including a brief period as acting director. After retiring, he ran briefly for a seat in the United States House of Representatives and joined the National Science Foundation as director of Christchurch Operations in the Office of Polar Programs.

== Early life ==
Anthony Peter German was born at a US military post near Augsburg, Germany in 1959, while his father Andrew H. German was serving in the United States Army. German's mother Helga was a native of Germany who later became a US citizen. He was raised and educated in Roxbury, New York and is a 1977 graduate of Roxbury Central School. While in high school, German worked at the Plattekill Mountain ski area, where his duties included running the chair lift, operating the tow bar, and making snow.

After high school, German and two friends began a bicycle trip to California; German turned back in Green Bay, Wisconsin while his friends continued on to San Francisco. After returning to Roxbury, he was employed by a paving company as a curb installer. German completed an Associate of Arts degree in accounting at the State University of New York at Cobleskill in 1979. In 1981, he graduated from the State University of New York at Oneonta with a Bachelor of Science in business economics.

== Start of career ==
In May 1982, German enlisted in the United States Air Force. In February 1983, he completed Officer Training School and received his commission as a second lieutenant. After receiving his commission, German was a student in the Undergraduate Navigator Training Course at Mather Air Force Base, California from February to September 1983. From September 1983 to March 1984 he was a student at C-130 Military Transport Aircraft Navigator Initial and Mission Qualification, which took place at Little Rock Air Force Base, Arkansas. German was next assigned as a C-130E aircraft navigator at Pope Air Force Base, North Carolina, where he served from March 1984 to September 1985. In February 1985, he received promotion to first lieutenant. From September 1985 to September 1987, he was a C-130E instructor navigator at Pope Air Force Base. In February 1987, he received promotion to captain. German then left the regular Air Force in September 1987, and he was a member of the Inactive Air Force Reserve until January 1989.

After leaving the Air Force, German resided first in Richmondville, New York, and later in Oneonta, New York, and he worked as an accountant in Oneonta. In January 1989, German joined the New York Air National Guard and was assigned as a navigator with the 139th Tactical Airlift Squadron at Stratton Air National Guard Base in Scotia, New York. In October 1989, he was assigned as standardization evaluation officer and navigator at Headquarters, 109th Tactical Airlift Group. From October 1992 to September 1993, German served as weapons and tactics officer and navigator at Headquarters, 109th Airlift Group. He was next assigned as navigator at Headquarters, 109th Airlift Group, where he served from October 1993 to September 1994. In May 1994, German was promoted to major. From October 1994 to September 1996, German was assigned as weapons and tactics officer with the 109th Operations Support Flight. In October 1996, he was assigned as weapons and tactics officer and evaluator navigator with the 109th Operational Support Flight, where he remained until September 1997. From October 1997 to September 1998, German was the 109th Operations Support Flight's chief of current operations and LC-130H aircraft evaluator navigator.

=== Flight qualifications ===
German's flight qualifications include:

- Rating: Master Navigator
- Flight hours: Over 4,900
- Aircraft flown: C/LC-130 B, E, H, C-26B, T-43, T-37

== Later career ==
German served as chief of standardization and evaluation with the 139th Airlift Squadron from October 1998 to September 2000. He was promoted to lieutenant colonel in May 1998. From October 2000 to June 2001, he served as chief of wing plans for the 109th Airlift Wing. He was then selected to attend the Naval War College, from which he graduated in June 2002 with a Master of Arts degree in national security and strategic studies. From June 2002 to February 2003, he again served as the 109th Airlift Wing's chief of wing plans. From March 2003 to June 2004, German was assigned to the Air National Guard Readiness Center as United States Department of Defense liaison to the National Science Foundation. He was promoted to colonel in June 2003. As a longtime member of the 109th Airlift Wing, the only US military unit that flies ski-equipped aircraft for landing on snow or ice, German was extensively involved in Operation Deep Freeze, the ongoing US research missions in Antarctica. As a result of German's contributions to polar research, the US Advisory Committee on Antarctic Names designated an ice feature as German Glacier.

From June 2004 to February 2006 German was assigned as executive support staff officer for the New York Air National Guard at Joint Force Headquarters – New York in Latham, New York. He commanded the 109th Airlift Wing from March 2006 to April 2010. He served as chief of staff of the New York Air National Guard from April 2010 to May 2015, and was promoted to brigadier general in June 2010. As chief of staff, he was a leader in coordinating the National Guard response to Hurricane Irene and Tropical Storm Lee in 2011 and Hurricane Sandy in 2012. In June 2015, he was promoted to major general and assigned as New York's assistant adjutant general and commander of the New York Air National Guard. From April 2016 to September 2018, German served as the Adjutant General of New York, succeeding Patrick A. Murphy. As adjutant general, German oversaw the New York National Guard's continued participation in the Global War on Terrorism, including 2017 inspection and observation visits to New York soldiers in Kuwait. After he was succeeded by Raymond F. Shields Jr., from October 2018 to January 2019, German was a special assistant to the director of the Air National Guard, which included temporary duty as acting director. He retired in February 2019.

In 2019, German entered the race to represent New York's 19th congressional district in the United States House of Representatives; he suspended his campaign for the Republican in January 2020. In July 2020, German was appointed director of Christchurch operations for the National Science Foundation's Office of Polar Programs. In this role, he supported the US Antarctic program's 2020 Southern Hemisphere summer deployment activities.

== Military education ==
In addition to attending the Naval War College, military education and training German completed during his career included:

- 1994 – Squadron Officer School, Maxwell Air Force Base, Alabama
- 1998 – Air Command and Staff College, Maxwell Air Force Base, Alabama (distance learning)
- 2011 – Joint Task Force Commander Training Course, United States Northern Command, Peterson Air Force Base, Colorado
- 2011 – Senior Leader Orientation Course, National Guard Bureau, Joint Base Andrews, Maryland
- 2012 – Air Force Smart Operations for the 21st Century, University of Tennessee, Knoxville, Tennessee
- 2012 – CAPSTONE Military Leadership Program, National Defense University, Fort Lesley J. McNair, Washington, D.C.
- 2012 – Senior Executive Seminar, George C. Marshall European Center for Security Studies, Garmisch-Partenkirchen, Germany
- 2012 – Senior Reserve Component Officer Course, United States Army War College, Carlisle Barracks, Pennsylvania
- 2012 – Homeland Protection Course, MIT Lincoln Laboratory, Massachusetts Institute of Technology, Lexington, Massachusetts
- 2013 – Advanced Joint Professional Military Education, Joint Forces Staff College, Norfolk, Virginia
- 2014 – National Security Management Course, Maxwell School of Citizenship and Public Affairs, Syracuse University, Syracuse, New York
- 2015 – General and Flag Officer Homeland Security Executive Seminar, Harvard University, Cambridge, Massachusetts
- 2016 – Advanced Senior Leader Development Program – Strategic Engagement Seminar, National Guard Bureau, Warrenton, Virginia
- 2017 – Strategies in Leading Diverse Organizations, Harvard University, Cambridge, Massachusetts
- 2018 – Executive Education in Leadership Decision Making, Harvard University, Cambridge, Massachusetts
- 2018 – Executive Certificate with Concentration in Public Leadership, Harvard Kennedy School of Government, Harvard University, Cambridge, Massachusetts

== Awards ==
German's awards and decorations include:

- Air Force Distinguished Service Medal
- Legion of Merit
- Meritorious Service Medal with two oak leaf clusters
- Aerial Achievement Medal with oak leaf cluster
- Gallant Unit Citation with four oak leaf clusters
- Air Force Outstanding Unit Award with one silver and one bronze oak leaf cluster
- Air Force Recognition Ribbon
- National Defense Service Medal with one bronze service star
- Antarctica Service Medal
- Global War on Terrorism Service Medal
- Armed Forces Service Medal
- Humanitarian Service Medal
- Air Force Longevity Service Award
- Armed Forces Reserve Medal with gold hourglass device
- Small Arms Expert Marksmanship Ribbon
- Air Force Training Ribbon

== Promotion dates ==
German's effective dates of promotion were:

- Major General, 3 June 2015
- Brigadier General, 9 June 2010
- Colonel, 27 June 2003
- Lieutenant Colonel, 8 December 1998
- Major, 27 May 1994
- Captain 15 February 1987
- First Lieutenant, 15 February 1985
- Second Lieutenant, 15 February 1983
- Enlisted service, 7 May 1982 to 14 February 1983
