= Adjutant General of New York =

Head of the New York National Guard

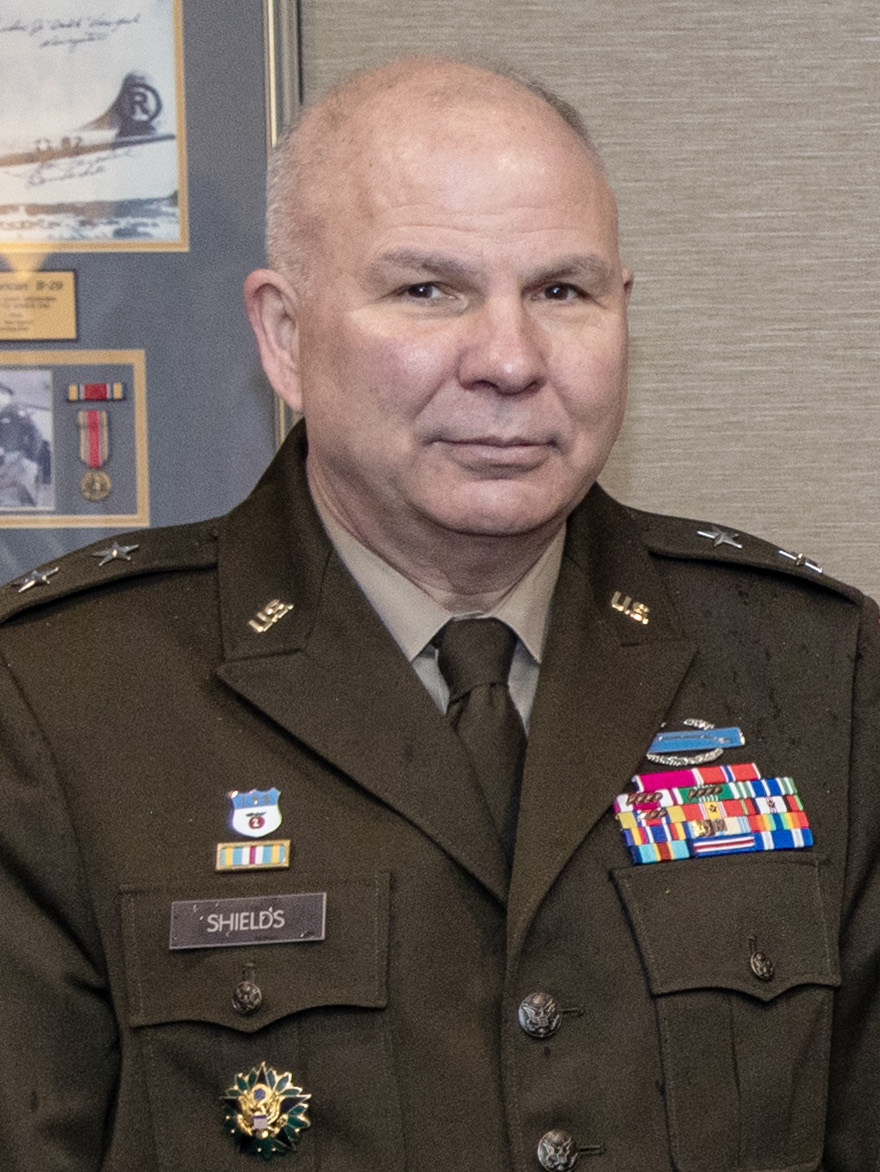
Major General Ray Shields

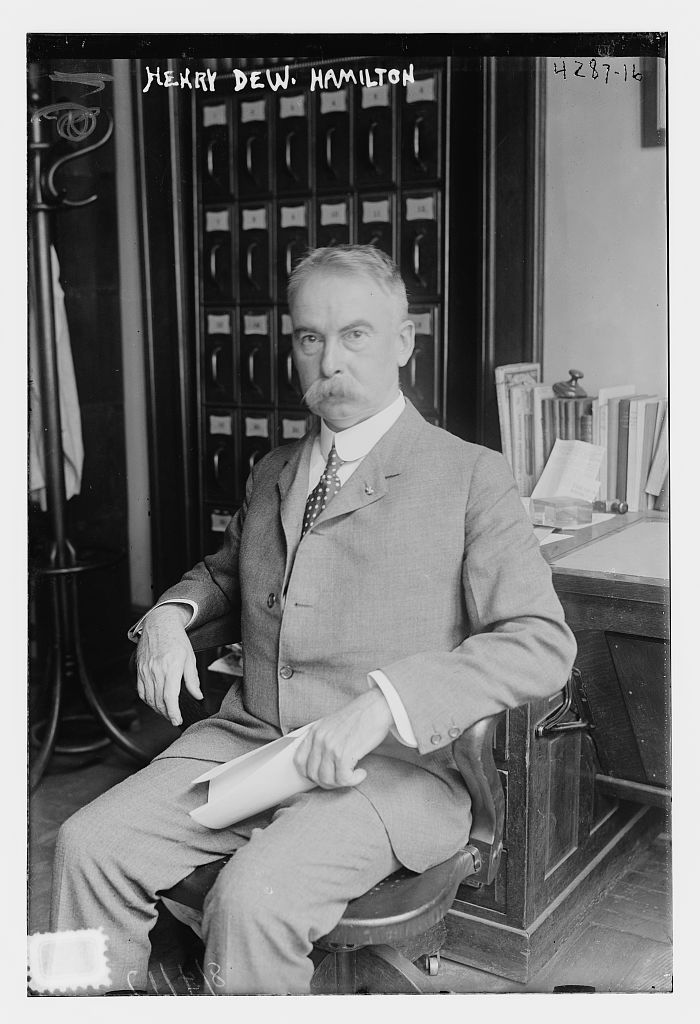
Henry DeWitt Hamilton

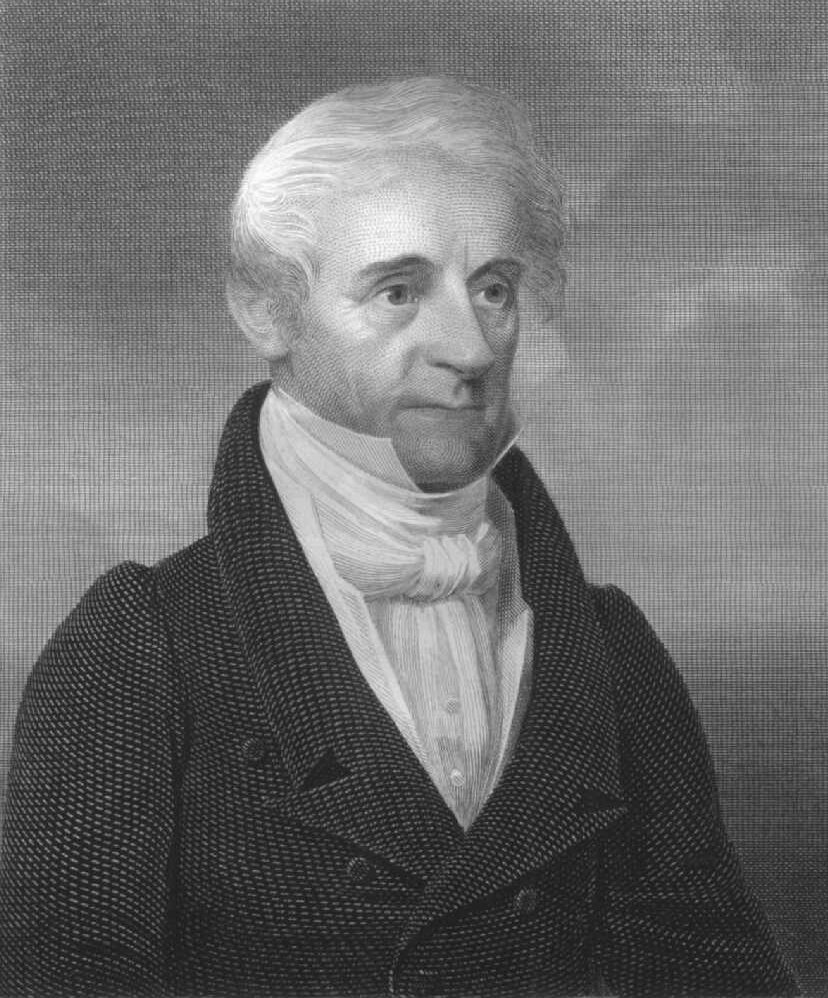
Solomon Van Rensselaer

The adjutant general of New York is the highest-ranking military official in the New York National Guard as the state adjutant general. The adjutant general is part of the state government's executive branch, and serves as head of the New York State Division of Military and Naval Affairs, which includes the New York Army National Guard, New York Air National Guard, the New York Guard, and the New York Naval Militia.

Adjutants general were originally selected by the state Council of Appointment. Since 1822 the adjutant general has been appointed by the governor of New York. Adjutants general serve a four-year term and hold the rank of major general. In 1948, a newly-enacted law designated the senior National Guard leader in New York as Chief of Staff to the Governor. Legislation passed in 1988 changed the title back to adjutant general.

The first adjutant general of New York was Nicholas Fish, who was appointed on April 13, 1784. The current holder of the position is Raymond F. Shields Jr., who was appointed in 2018.

== Adjutants general of New York ==
- 71. Raymond F. Shields Jr., since 2018
- 70. Anthony P. German, 2016–2018
- 69. Patrick A. Murphy, 2010–2016
- 68. Joseph J. Taluto, 2006–2010
- 67. Thomas P. Maguire, 2001–2006
- 66. John H. Fenimore V, 1995–2001
- 65. Michael S. Hall, 1992–1995
- 64. Lawrence P. Flynn, 1986–1992
- 63. Vito J. Castellano, 1975–1986
- 62. John C. Baker, 1971–1975
- 61. Almerin C. O'Hara, 1959–1971
- 60. Ronald C. Brock, 1957–1959
- 59. Karl F. Hausauer, 1950–1957
- 58. Ames T. Brown, 1940–1950
- 57. Walter G. Robinson, 1934–1940
- 56. Franklin W. Ward, 1926–1934
- 55. Edward J. Westcott, 1923–1926
- 54. Charles W. Berry, 1923
- 53. J. Leslie Kincaid, 1920–1923
- 52. Charles W. Berry, 1919–1920
- 51. Charles H. Sherrill, 1917–1918
- 50. Louis W. Stotesbury, 1915–1917
- 49. Henry DeWitt Hamilton, 1913–1915
- 48. William Verbeck, 1910–1913
- 47. Nelson H. Henry, 1902–1910
- 46. Frederick Phisterer, 1901–1902
- 45. Edward M. Hoffman, 1900–1901
- 44. Avery D. Andrews, 1899–1900
- 43. C. Whitney Tillinghast 2nd, 1897–1898
- 42. Edwin A. McAlpin, 1895–1897
- 41. Thomas H. McGrath, 1894–1895
- 40. Josiah Porter, 1886–1894
- 39. John G. Farnsworth, 1883–1886
- 38. Frederick Townsend, 1880–1883
- 37. John B. Woodward, 1879–1880
- 36. Franklin Townsend, 1875–1879
- 35. John F. Rathbone, 1873–1875
- 34. Franklin Townsend, 1869–1873
- 33. Selden E. Marvin, 1867–1869
- 32. William Irvine, 1865–1867
- 31. John T. Sprague, 1863–1865
- 30. Thomas Hillhouse, 1861–1863
- 29. John Meredith Read Jr., 1861
- 28. Frederick Townsend, 1857–1861
- 27. Robert H. Pruyn, 1855–1857
- 26. John Watts de Peyster, 1855
- 25. Isaac Vanderpoel, 1854–1855
- 24. Robert E. Temple, 1853–1854
- 23. L. Ward Smith, 1851–1853
- 22. Samuel Stevens, 1847–1851
- 21. Robert E. Temple, 1846–1847
- 20. Thomas Farrington, 1845–1846
- 19. Archibald C. Niven, 1843–1845
- 18. Lyman Sanford, 1843
- 17. Rufus King, 1839–1843
- 16. Allan MacDonald, 1837–1839
- 15. Thomas W. Harman, 1836–1837
- 14. Levi Hubbell, 1833–1836
- 13. John Adams Dix, 1831–1833
- 12. Matthew H. Webster, 1830–1831
- 11. Nicholas F. Beck, 1825–1830
- 10. Charles G. Haines, 1825
- 9. William K. Fuller, 1823–1824
- 8. William L. Marcy, 1821–1823
- 7. Solomon Van Rensselaer, 1813–1821
- 6. William Paulding Jr., 1811–1813
- 5. Solomon Van Rensselaer, 1810–1811
- 4. William Paulding Jr., 1809–1810
- 3. Solomon Van Rensselaer, 1801–1809
- 2. David Van Horne, 1793–1801
- 1. Nicholas Fish, 1784–1793. He was appointed as the first Adjutant General of New York on April 13, 1784.

== Bibliography ==
Books

- Eisenstadt, Peter R. (2005). The Encyclopedia of New York State. Syracuse, NY: Syracuse University Press. ISBN 978-0-8156-0808-0.
- Hugo, Francis M., New York Secretary of State (1919). Manual for Use of the Legislature of the State of New York. Albany, New York: J. B. Lyon Company.

Internet

- General Officer Management Office (2019). "Biography, Major General Anthony P. German". Latham, New York: National Guard Bureau.
- General Officer Management Office (2010). "Biography, Major General Patrick A. Murphy". Arlington, Virginia: National Guard Bureau.
- General Officer Management Office (2006). "Biography, Major General Joseph J. Taluto". Nationalguard.mil/. Arlington, Virginia: National Guard Bureau.
- General Officer Management Office (1995). "Biography, Major General John H. Fenimore V". Nationalguard.mil/. Arlington, Virginia: National Guard Bureau.
- "Major General Raymond F Shields Jr". New York State Division of Military and Naval Affairs. October 1, 2018.

Newspapers

- "Broome Republicans May Land State Jobs". Binghamton Press. Binghamton, New York. November 5, 1920 – via Newspapers.com.
- "Kincaid Adjutant General". Olean Times Herald. Olean, New York. December 14, 1920 – via Newspapers.com.
- "Berry Named Successor to General O'Ryan". The Ithaca Journal-News. Ithaca, New York. May 24, 1923 – via Newspapers.com.
- "Governor Appoints Westcott". Olean Times Herald. Olean, New York. November 28, 1923 – via Newspapers.com.
- "Westcott Gets Berry's Old Post in N. Y. Guard". Brooklyn Eagle. Brooklyn, New York. November 28, 1923 – via Newspapers.com.
- "Ward is Named Guard Adjutant". Binghamton Press. Binghamton, New York. Associated Press. February 15, 1926 – via Newspapers.com.
- "Robinson Is Named Adjutant General. Veteran Colonel Succeeds Major General F. W. Ward, Who Has Been Retired". The New York Times. December 12, 1934.
- "National Guard Leader Dies in N. Y. City Hotel". Binghamton Press. Binghamton, New York. Associated Press. January 25, 1940 – via Newspapers.com.
- "Around New York State: Albany". The Ithaca Journal. Ithaca, New York. Associated Press. March 14, 1940 – via Newspapers.com.
- "Gen. K. F. Hausauer is made New York's First Chief of Staff". Binghamton Press. Binghamton, New York. Associated Press. May 5, 1949 – via Newspapers.com.
- "Guard to Honor Hausauer". Poughkeepsie Journal. Poughkeepsie, New York. Associated Press. February 9, 1957 – via Newspapers.com.
- "Gen. R. C. Brock Retires Wednesday". The Record. Troy, New York. June 27, 1959 – via Newspapers.com.
- "Gen. O'Hara Appointed Chief of Staff". The Daily Star. Oneonta, New York. August 28, 1959 – via Newspapers.com.
- "Carey Shuffles Agencies". The Journal News. White Plains, New York. United Press International. December 14, 1975 – via Newspapers.com.
- "Guard Gets New Chief". Star-Gazette. Elmira, NY. January 22, 1971 – via Newspapers.com.
- Humbert, Marc (January 8, 1986). "New York National Guard Under Fire". The Journal News. White Plains, New York. Associated Press – via Newspapers.com.
- "National Guard Chief to be Named". Press & Sun-Bulletin. Binghamton, New York. Associated Press. April 25, 1986 – via Newspapers.com.
- Hill, David (August 4, 1992). "Dryden Man Heads New York's Militia". The Ithaca Journal. Ithaca, New York – via Newspapers.com.
- "Chief Soldier in State Announces Retirement". Democrat and Chronicle. Rochester, New York. Associated Press. April 2, 1992 – via newspapers.com.
- Crawford, Franklin (April 13, 1995). "Pataki Fires National Guard Leader". The Ithaca Journal. Ithaca, New York – via Newspapers.com.
- Davis, John (November 6, 2005). "Tribute Paid to Military Man". Poughkeepsie Journal. Poughkeepsie, New York – via Newspapers.com.
