= Joseph J. Taluto =

United States Army general

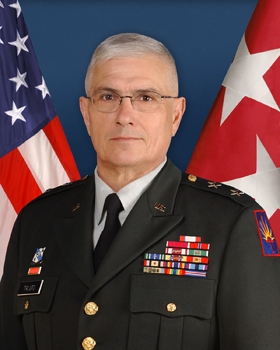
- Born: December 12, 1947 (age 78); Rochester, New York
- Military career
- Allegiance: United States
- Branch: United States Army
- Service years: 1965-1968 (enlisted); 1968-2010 (officer)
- Rank: Major general
- Unit: New York Army National Guard
- Commands: Adjutant General, New York; 42nd Infantry Division
- Conflicts: Operation Iraqi Freedom
- Awards: Army Distinguished Service Medal; Legion of Merit; Bronze Star Medal

Joseph J. Taluto (born December 12, 1947) is a retired United States Army officer who served as the Adjutant General of New York. As adjutant general, he was the director of the New York State Division of Military & Naval Affairs, and served as overall commander of the New York Army National Guard, New York Air National Guard, New York Guard and New York Naval Militia. Taluto commanded the 42nd Infantry Division (United States) in Iraq during Operation Iraqi Freedom from 2004 to 2006. He attained the rank of major general, and was a recipient of the Army Distinguished Service Medal, Legion of Merit, and Bronze Star Medal.

== Military career and background ==
Taluto enlisted in the Army National Guard in 1965. He attended Officer Candidate School at Empire State Military Academy, and was commissioned as a second lieutenant in 1968. He was hired as a full-time state employee of the National Guard, and in 1970 became a uniformed federal technician. He served as a technician until 2001.

After graduating from Air Defense Artillery basic course, Taluto served as a platoon leader for Headquarters Company, New York Army National Guard, then was then assigned to the Nike-Hercules Missile Program. After a transfer to the Armor branch, he held a variety of positions in the 1st Battalion, 210th Armor, including command positions in three companies while completing the Armor Officer Advanced Course. After serving in operations officer assignments at several levels of command, he was assigned as Chief of Staff, Headquarters, Troop Command, New York Army National Guard, with subsequent assignments as Chief of Staff, 42nd Infantry Division; Chief of Staff, State Area Command; Deputy Commander, 27th Infantry Brigade; Assistant Division Commander, 42nd Infantry Division; and Commander of the 42nd Infantry Division.

In 1986 Taluto received a Bachelor of Science degree from Regents College of the University of the State of New York (now Excelsior University). In 1995 he graduated from the Army War College.

Taluto served as the Joint Task Force Commander during the 42nd Infantry Division’s initial emergency response mission to assist the New York City in its security and recovery operations following the September 11th, 2001 terrorist attacks at the World Trade Center. He directed a force of some 2,000 Soldiers, Airmen, sailors and Marines to assist the city’s Office of Emergency Management.

== Operation Iraqi Freedom ==
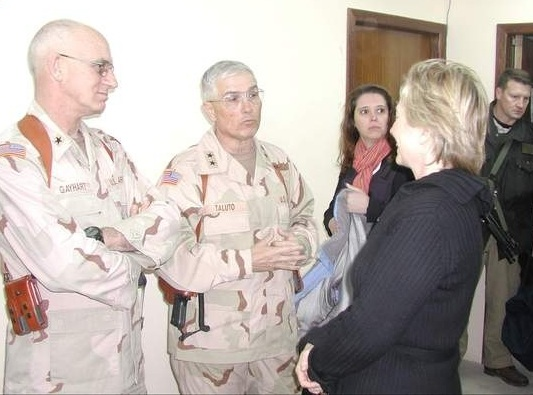
Taluto and 116th Brigade Combat Team commander Alan Gayhart greet Senator Hillary Clinton at Forward Operating Base Warrior, February 20, 2005

In 2002, Taluto succeeded George T. Garrett as assigned as commander of the 42nd Infantry Division, New York Army National Guard, and he commanded the division as well as Task Force Liberty during its deployment in support of Operation Iraqi Freedom III. The unit rotated into Iraq to replace Task Force Danger, composed of the 1st Infantry Division and commanded by Maj. Gen. John R. S. Batiste.

The Task Force included the first and third brigades of the 3rd Infantry Division, the 116th Infantry Brigade, engineer and aviation units of the 82nd Airborne Division, the 278th Armored Cavalry Regiment, and the 411th Civil Affairs Battalion.

== Deaths of Esposito and Allen ==
The deaths of Phillip Esposito and Louis Allen were caused on June 7, 2005, at Forward Operating Base Danger in Tikrit, Iraq. Captain Phillip Esposito and First Lieutenant Louis Allen, from a New York Army National Guard unit of the United States 42nd Infantry Division, were killed by a Claymore mine placed in the window of Esposito's office.

Esposito was commander of the unit which supported Taluto, his assistant division commanders and division staff, Headquarters and Headquarters Company 42nd Infantry Division. Allen had recently arrived in Iraq to serve as Esposito's supply officer.

Military investigators determined that the mine was deliberately placed and detonated with the intention of killing Esposito and Allen. Staff Sergeant Alberto B. Martinez {died 2017}, a soldier in the officers' unit was charged in the killing but was acquitted in a court martial trial at Fort Bragg, North Carolina, on December 4, 2008. The case was one of only three publicly announced alleged fragging incidents among American forces during the Iraq war.

== Nomination for Director, Army National Guard ==
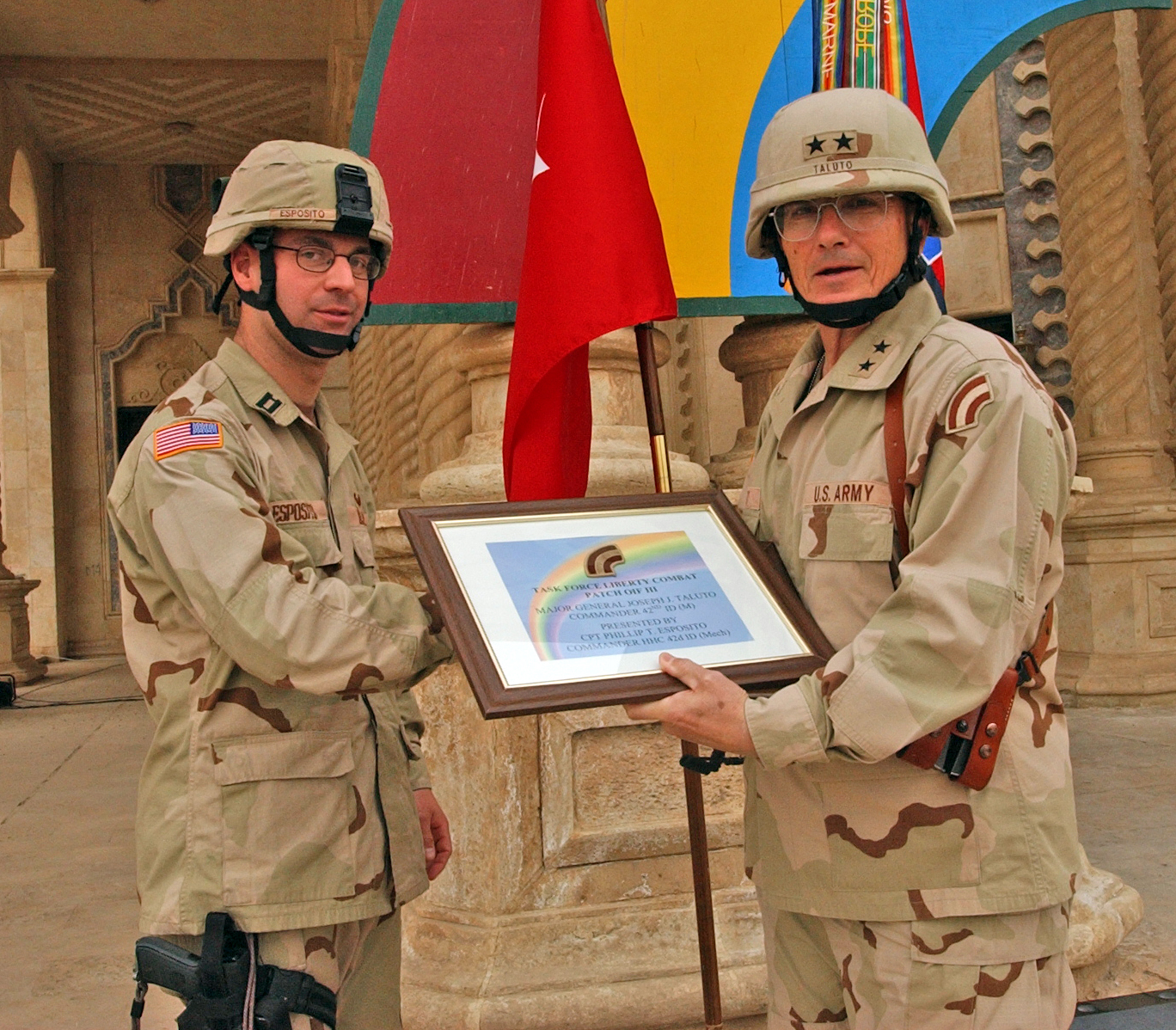
Major General Joseph Taluto (R) and Captain Phillip Esposito (L) at FOB Danger, Tikrit, Iraq on March 3rd, 2005

After returning from Iraq, Taluto was succeeded as division commander by Paul C. Genereux. From 2006 to 2010, Taluto served as Adjutant General of New York, succeeding Thomas P. Maguire. In May, 2009 he was nominated for the position of Director, Army National Guard, a position second only to the Chief, National Guard Bureau in the National Guard's leadership. The director's position would have included promotion to lieutenant general.

Senate action on Taluto's nomination was delayed because of opposition from Siobhan Esposito, the widow of Captain Esposito. Mrs. Esposito argued through her blog and other forums that Taluto could have prevented the murders of her husband and First Lieutenant Allen had he enforced military regulations that proscribed death threats against superior officers, as well as other broad-based principles of military discipline. Esposito further argued that even if Taluto lacked specific knowledge of the actions of soldiers under his command, he was nevertheless responsible for his command's larger culture.

Taluto's nomination had not been acted on by the Senate when Taluto withdrew himself from consideration and retired in February, 2010. He was succeeded as adjutant general by Patrick A. Murphy.

== Awards and decorations ==
Taluto's awards and decorations include the Army Distinguished Service Medal, Legion of Merit, Bronze Star Medal, Meritorious Service Medal with Silver and two Bronze Oak Leaf Clusters, Army Commendation Medal with Bronze Oak Leaf Cluster, the Army Achievement Medal with Bronze Oak Leaf Cluster, the Army Reserve Component Achievement Medal with Silver and four Bronze Oak Leaf Clusters, the National Defense Service Medal with Bronze Service Star, the Iraq Campaign Medal, the Global War on Terrorism Service Medal, the Humanitarian Service Medal, the Armed Forces Reserve Medal with Gold Hourglass, Bronze Hourglass and M Device, and the New York State Conspicuous Service Cross.

== Post military career ==
In 2010 Taluto joined Excelsior University as Executive in Residence, responsible for expanding the school's outreach to military members and veterans.

Also in 2010 Taluto formed Taluto Group, LLC, a Florida consulting company that focuses on homeland security planning.

In 2011 Taluto was appointed to the Florida Defense Support Task Force.

== See also ==
- Official Biography from the National Guard Bureau

Preceded by Thomas P. Maguire, Jr.	Adjutant General of New York State; 2006–2010	Succeeded by Patrick A. Murphy
