= Avery D. Andrews =

American lawyer

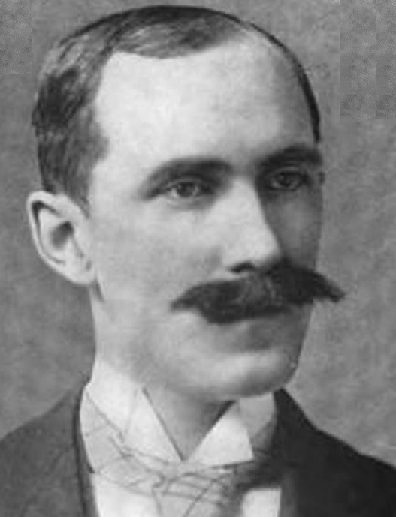
- From 1899's Notable New Yorkers of 1896–1899
- Born: April 4, 1864; Massena, New York, U.S.
- Died: April 19, 1959 (aged 95); Winter Park, Florida, U.S.
- Burial place: Arlington National Cemetery
- Education: George Washington University
- Spouse: Mary Campbell Schofield (m. 1888–1945 (her death))
- Children: 2
- Relatives: John Schofield (father in law)
- Military career
- Allegiance: United States
- Branch: United States Army; New York National Guard; Organized Reserve Corps
- Service years: 1886–1893, 1898–1899, 1917–1919 (Army); 1893–1898, 1899–1900 (National Guard); 1921–1926 (Organized Reserve Corps)
- Rank: Brigadier General
- Unit: United States Army Field Artillery Branch
- Commands: Squadron A, New York National Guard; New York National Guard
- Conflicts: Spanish–American War; World War I
- Awards: Army Distinguished Service Medal; French Legion of Honor (Commander); Belgian Order of the Crown; Italian Order of the Crown
- Other work: Army officer Attorney; Corporation director and executive

Avery D. Andrews (April 4, 1864 – April 19, 1959) was an officer in the United States Army and a corporate attorney and executive. He was most prominent for his service as a brigadier general on the staff of the American Expeditionary Forces headquarters during World War I.

A native New York state's North Country, Andrews graduated from the United States Military Academy in 1886, and was a classmate of John J. Pershing. He served as an artillery officer, and was appointed aide-de-camp to John Schofield, whose daughter he married in 1888. After graduating with law degrees from Columbian University and New York Law School, Andrews resigned from the army and became a successful corporate attorney and executive in New York City. He returned to the army for the Spanish–American War, and served as Adjutant General of New York during the governorship of Theodore Roosevelt.

Andrews again returned to the army for World War I; he attained the rank of brigadier general, and his service culminated with assignment as Assistant Chief of Staff for Personnel (C-1) on the headquarters staff of the American Expeditionary Forces. After the war, Andrews remained a brigadier general in the Organized Reserve Corps until retiring in 1926. He practiced law until retiring to Florida in 1943.

In 1934, Andrews published a Pershing biography. He died in Florida in 1959, and was buried at Arlington National Cemetery.

== Early life ==
Avery Delano Andrews was born in Massena, New York on April 4, 1864, the son of Hannibal and Harriet (Delano) Andrews. He was educated in Massena, and attended Williston Seminary from 1881 to 1882. In 1882, Andrews began attendance at the United States Military Academy, from which he graduated, 14 in a graduating class of 77, in 1886, the same class which included John J. Pershing. Andrews was commissioned a second lieutenant in the 5th Artillery, and served at Fort Columbus on Governors Island, New York.

== Early career ==
Andrews was on special duty at Headquarters, Division of the Atlantic in 1888. From 1889 to 1892 he was aide-de-camp to Lieutenant General John Schofield, the Commanding General of the United States Army. He was promoted to first lieutenant in 1892. While serving as Schofield's aide, Andrews received a LL.B. degree from Columbian University (now George Washington University Law School). In 1892 he received an LL.B. from New York Law School. Andrews was admitted to the bar in New York, and resigned from the Army in 1893.

== Continued career ==
Andrews established a successful law practice in New York City as a partner in the firm of Wells and Andrews. He was also an officer and director of several corporations including general counsel and vice president for Barber Asphalt Paving Company; American representative for the Royal Dutch Shell Petroleum Company; Director of Irving Trust Company; and Director of Central National Bank. In 1895 he was appointed to New York City's Board of Police Commissioners by Mayor William L. Strong. Andrews served as treasurer of the board while Theodore Roosevelt was its president.

== Spanish–American War ==
After resigning from the Army, Andrews was appointed Engineers officer on the staff of the New York National Guard's 1st Brigade, and commissioned as a major. In 1898 he was appointed commander of Squadron A, a separate unit of the New York National Guard. When the Spanish–American War began in 1898, Andrews was commissioned a lieutenant colonel in the United States Volunteers, and assigned as chief quartermaster and assistant inspector general on the staff of 1st Division, Sixth Army Corps, which was commanded by Major General James H. Wilson.

In 1899, Andrews was appointed by Governor Theodore Roosevelt to succeed C. Whitney Tillinghast 2nd as Adjutant General of New York. Andrews was promoted to brigadier general in the National Guard, and he served as adjutant general until 1900. Andrews was succeeded by Edward M. Hoffman.

== Post-Spanish–American War ==
After the war, Andrews returned to his law practice and business interests, and was recognized as an expert in federal and state laws pertaining to the railroad, oil, and banking industries.

== World War I ==
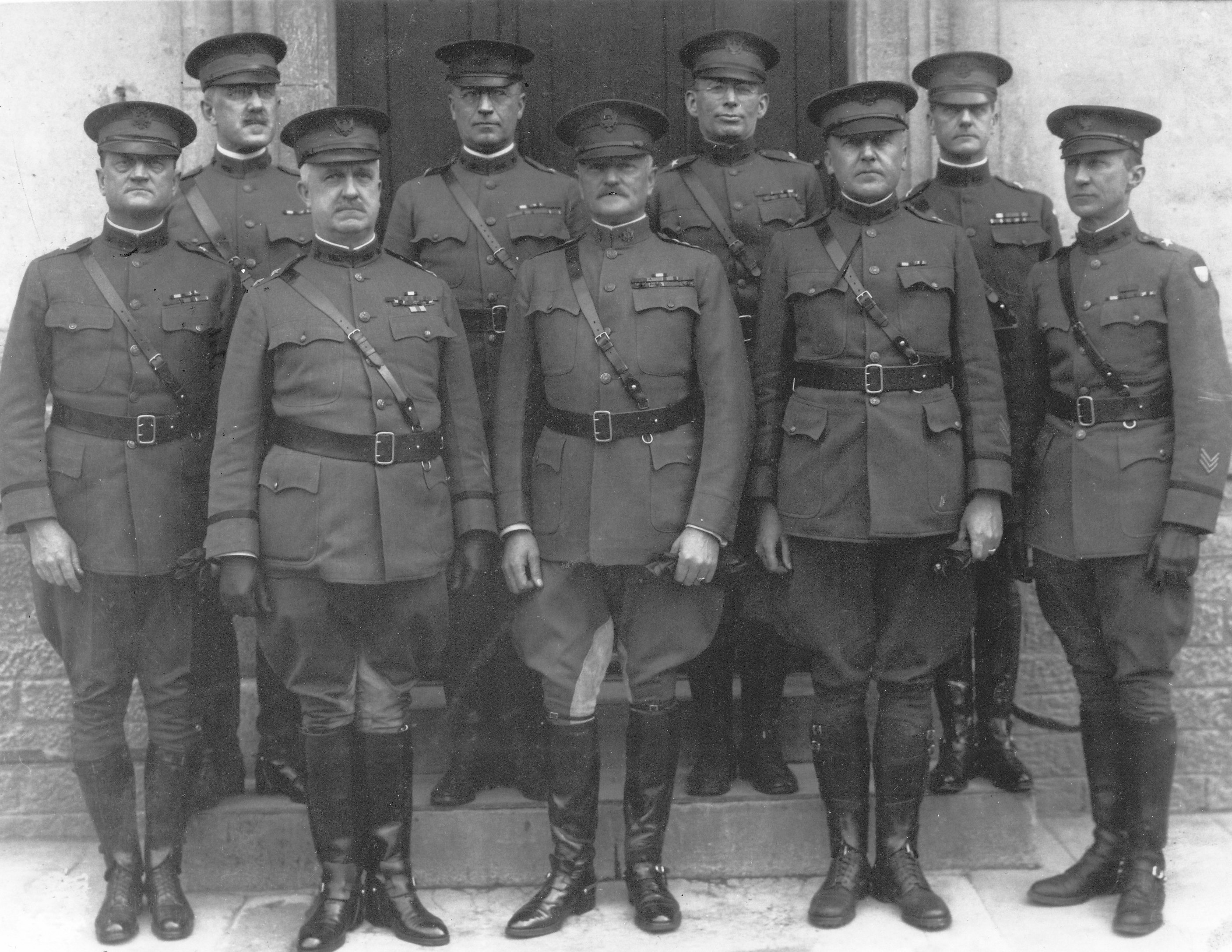
General John J. Pershing and members of his staff. Stood on the far left in the back row is Brigadier General Avery D. Andrews.

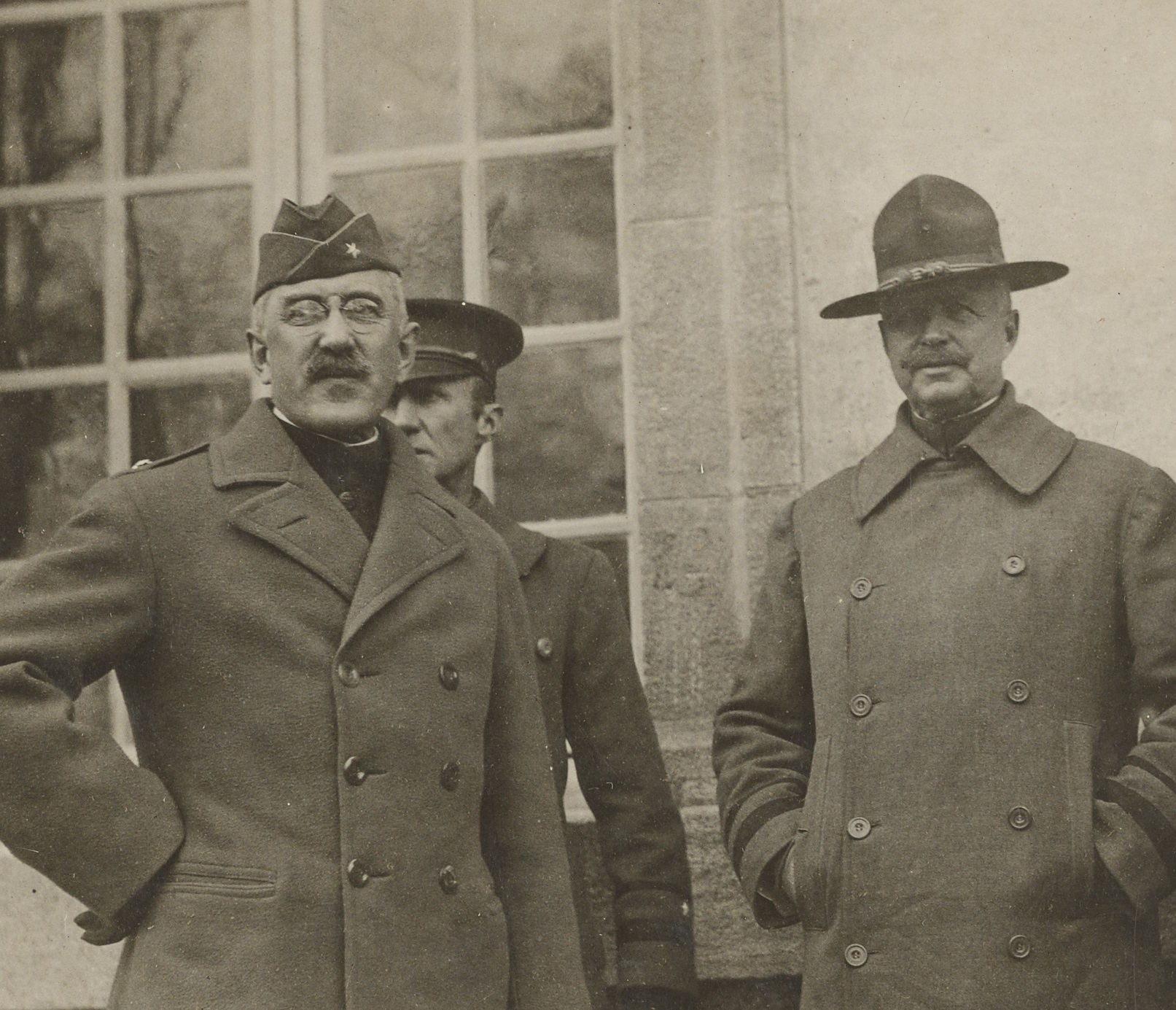
Andrews (left) with fellow generals George Moseley and Charles Treat in 1918.

When the United States entered World War I in 1917, Andrews was appointed Director of Military Service for the state of Pennsylvania's Committee of Public Safety. In October of that year he resigned as director in order to return to active military service. Commissioned as a colonel of Engineers in the National Army, he sailed for France in November. Andrews joined the Service of Supply, and served successively as deputy director of Transportation, Deputy Chief of Utilities, and Deputy Assistant Chief of Staff. In August 1918, he was appointed Assistant Chief of Staff for Personnel (C-1) on the headquarters staff of the American Expeditionary Forces. He was promoted to brigadier general in October 1918, and served until returning to the United States and receiving his discharge in May, 1919.

== Post-World War I ==
Following his World War I service, Andrews was appointed a brigadier general in the Organized Reserve Corps, and he served from 1921 until retiring in April, 1926. He continued to practice law and serve on corporate boards, and he remained active until retiring in 1943 and moving to Winter Park, Florida. He was president of the Association of Graduates of the United States Military Academy from 1928 to 1931 and served as a trustee of George Washington University and the Grant Memorial Association, and a director of the American Society of the French Legion of Honor. In 1934 he authored a biography, My Friend and Classmate, John J. Pershing.

== Awards and decorations ==
Andrews' awards included the Army Distinguished Service Medal, the French Legion of Honor (Commander), the Belgian Order of the Crown, and the Italian Order of the Crown. The citation for his Army DSM reads:

The President of the United States of America, authorized by Act of Congress, July 9, 1918, takes pleasure in presenting the Army Distinguished Service Medal to Brigadier General Avery DeLano Andrews, United States Army, for exceptionally meritorious and distinguished services to the Government of the United States, in a duty of great responsibility during World War I. As Assistant Chief of Staff, American Expeditionary Forces, General Andrews has rendered most efficient service in connection with the organization and administration of the Transportation Department of the American Army in France and as Deputy Chief of Utilities in the Services of Supply. Later, with marked ability, he headed the important administrative section of the General Staff of the American Expeditionary Forces.

== Death and legacy ==
Andrews died in Winter Park on April 19, 1959. He was buried in Arlington National Cemetery.

== Family ==
On September 27, 1888, Andrews married Mary Campbell Schofield, the daughter of Lieutenant General John Schofield. They were the parents of sons Schofield (1889-1971) and Delano Andrews (1894-1958), both of whom were veterans of World War I and prominent attorneys.

== Sources ==
=== Internet ===
- "Memorial, Avery D. Andrews 1886". apps.westpointaog.org. West Point, NY: West Point Association of Graduates. 1959. Archived from the original on February 21, 2018.

=== Books ===
- Davis, Henry Blaine Jr. (1998). Generals in Khaki. Raleigh, NC: Pentland Press. ISBN 978-1-57197-088-6.
- Hodgkins, H. L. (1891). Historical Catalogue of the Officers and Graduates of the Columbian University. Washington, DC: Columbian University Alumni Association. p. 164.

=== Magazines ===
- Tucker, J. Francis (1892). "Letters from Law Schools: New York Law School". The Intercollegiate Law Journal. Vol. 1–2. New York, NY: College Publishing Company.

=== Newspapers ===
- "Many Changes In The Guard Organizations". Brooklyn Times. Brooklyn, New York. 6 January 1900 – via Newspapers.com.
