= Thomas P. Maguire =

Adjutant General of New York (1947–2024)

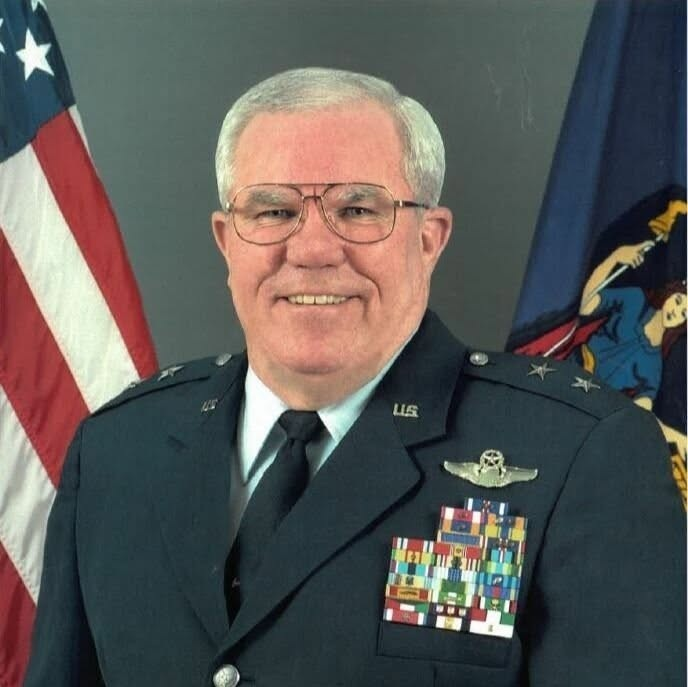
- Maguire as adjutant general, c. 2001
- Born: 8 June 1947; Mount Vernon, New York, US
- Died: 20 July 2024 (aged 77); Sun City Center, Florida, US
- Burial place: Sarasota National Cemetery
- Education: College of the Holy Cross; Air Command and Staff College; Industrial College of the Armed Forces
- Spouse: Deborah Georginne Combs (m. 1976–2024)
- Children: 3
- Military career
- Service: United States Air Force
- Service years: 1969–2005
- Rank: Major General
- Unit: New York Air National Guard
- Commands: 137th Military Airlift Squadron; Adjutant General of New York
- Wars: Vietnam War; Gulf War; Global War On Terrorism
- Awards: Air Force Distinguished Service Medal; Legion of Merit; Distinguished Flying Cross (3); Complete List

Thomas P. Maguire (8 June 1947 – 20 July 2024) was a career officer in the United States Air Force. A veteran of the Vietnam War and the Gulf War, he served from 1969 to 2005 and attained the rank of major general. A longtime member of the New York Air National Guard, Maguire's commands included the 137th Military Airlift Squadron and the 105th Airlift Wing and his awards included the Air Force Distinguished Service Medal, Legion of Merit, and three awards of the Distinguished Flying Cross. From 2001 until his retirement, Maguire served as Adjutant General of New York.

== Early life ==
Thomas Patrick Maguire Jr. was born in Mount Vernon, New York on 8 June 1947, a son of World War II veteran Thomas P. Maguire Sr. (1918–1990) and Florence (Martin) Maguire. He was raised in Brewster, New York and graduated from St. James the Apostle School in Carmel, New York. Maguire was a 1965 graduate of Fordham Preparatory School in the Bronx.

Maguire attended the College of the Holy Cross from 1965 to 1969 and graduated with a Bachelor of Arts degree in history. While in college, Maguire participated in the Air Force Reserve Officer Training Corps (AFROTC). Maguire was a standout cadet and received several scholarships and awards, including the Sons of the American Revolution Medal for exemplary excellence in the AFROTC program. At the end of his college career, he was designated a distinguished ROTC graduate and received his commission as a second lieutenant.

== Start of career ==
After receiving his commission, Maguire was an undergraduate pilot training student at Laredo Air Force Base, Texas from July 1969 to July 1970. From July 1970 to August 1970 he was a student in the Survival Training Course at Fairchild Air Force Base, Washington. Maguire was a student in the Air Liaison Officer/Forward Air Controller Fighter Training Course at Cannon Air Force Base, New Mexico from August 1970 to November 1970. In November 1970, he attended the Tactical Air Control Support Systems School at Homestead Air Force Base, Florida. From November 1970 to February 1971 he was a student in the Special Operations Training Course for O-2A forward air controller pilots at Hurlburt Field, Florida. He was promoted to first lieutenant in December 1970.

In February 1971, Maguire was a student at the Pacific Air Force Jungle Survival School, which was held at Clark Air Base, Philippines. From February to May 1971, he was assigned as a forward air controller O-2A pilot based at Bien Hoa Air Base, South Vietnam. From May to September 1971, he was an O-2A pilot performing forward air controller duty at Tan Son Nhut Air Base, South Vietnam. Maguire served as a forward air controller O2A pilot at Phan Rang Air Base, South Vietnam from September 1971 to January 1972. From January 1972 to June 1973, Maguire was a squadron T-37 aircraft instructor pilot at Laredo Air Force Base, Texas. He was promoted to captain in June 1972.

=== Pilot qualifications ===
Maguire was rated a command pilot and logged more than 5,000 flight hours. The aircraft to which he was assigned during his career included the T-33A, T37-B, O-2A, C131D, and C-5A.

== Continued career ==
From June 1973 to July 1974, Maguire was a reserve officer assigned to Headquarters, Air Reserve Personnel Center in Colorado. In July 1974, he joined the New York Air National Guard as an O2A forward air control/tactical air control fighter qualifier with the 137th Tactical Air Support Squadron in White Plains. From December 1976 to October 1977, he was a tactical air control air liaison officer with the 137th Tactical Air Support Squadron. From October 1977 to September 1978, he was a forward air controller/tactical air control fighter qualifier with the 137th Tactical Air Support Squadron. In 1978, he graduated from the Air Command and Staff College. In March 1978, Maguire was promoted to major. In September 1978, he was assigned as an O2A forward air controller with the 105th Tactical Air Control Support Wing, where he served until July 1979.

From July to December 1979, Maguire was a forward air controller/tactical air controller with the 137th Tactical Air Support Group. He was then posted to duty as a forward air controller with the 137th Tactical Air Support Squadron, where he served until June 1982. From June 1982 to December 1983, Maguire was assigned as air operations officer for special operations and tactical air controller/air liaison officer with the 137th Tactical Air Support Squadron. In August 1982, Maguire received promotion to lieutenant colonel. In December 1983, he was assigned to command the 137th Military Airlift Squadron, and he served in this position until August 1987. From August 1987 to May 1988, he was director of operations for the 105th Military Airlift Group. From May 1988 to September 1991, he again served as commander of the 137th Military Airlift Squadron. Maguire served during the 1990–1991 Gulf War, during which he flew support missions to Southwest Asia. In 1991, he completed the National Security Management Course at the Industrial College of the Armed Forces.

== Later career ==
From September 1991 to October 1992, Maguire served as deputy commander for operations with the 105th Military Airlift Group. He was vice commander of the 105th Airlift Group from October 1992 to January 1994. In December 1992, he was promoted to colonel. Maguire commanded the 105th Airlift Wing from January 1994 to August 2001. He was promoted to brigadier general in March 1998. In August 2001, he was appointed to succeed John H. Fenimore V as Adjutant General of New York, and he was promoted to major general in April 2002. He served in this post until October 2005, when he retired and was succeeded by Joseph J. Taluto. Maguire's tenure was marked by the September 11 attacks of 2001, which led to the activation of more than 14,000 New York soldiers and airmen for security and recovery operations. He also oversaw New York's participation in the early years of the Global War on Terrorism, including the mobilization of thousands of military members for the Iraq War and the War in Afghanistan.

A longtime resident of Walden, New York, in 2010, Maguire moved to Sun City Center, Florida. In 2012, he joined The Roosevelt Group, a strategic consulting and communications firm, as a senior advisor. Maguire died in Sun City Center on 20 July 2024. He was buried at Sarasota National Cemetery. He was survived by his wife Deborah Georginne Combs, to whom he had been married since 1976, and their three children.

== Awards and decorations ==
Among Maguire's awards and decorations were: (Note: Maguire's service after the September 11 attacks likely qualified him for additional awards not included in his official biography, including the Global War On Terrorism Service Medal and a third award of the National Defense Service Medal.)

- Air Force Distinguished Service Medal
- Legion of Merit
- Distinguished Flying Cross with 2 oak leaf clusters
- Meritorious Service Medal with 1 oak leaf cluster
- Air Medal with numeral 9
- Air Force Commendation Medal
- Presidential Unit Citation
- Air Force Outstanding Unit Award with 3 oak leaf clusters
- Combat Readiness Medal
- National Defense Service Medal with 1 bronze service star
- Armed Forces Expeditionary Medal
- Southwest Asia Service Medal with two 2 bronze service stars
- Military Outstanding Volunteer Service Medal
- Humanitarian Service Medal
- Air Force Overseas Ribbon (Short Tour)
- Air Force Longevity Service Award with 6 oak leaf clusters
- Armed Forces Reserve Medal with gold hourglass device and M device
- Small Arms Expert Marksmanship Ribbon
- Air Force Training Ribbon
- Republic of Vietnam Gallantry Cross with palm
- Vietnam Campaign Medal
- Kuwait Liberation Medal (Saudi Arabia)
- Kuwait Liberation Medal (Kuwait)
- New York State Long and Faithful Service Award (30 years)
- New York State Desert Storm Service Medal
- New York State Conspicuous Service Cross with 1 silver cross
- New York State Aid to Civil Authority Medal with 1 silver shield
- New York State Exercise Support Ribbon with 1 silver E device

== Dates of rank ==
Maguire's dates of rank were:

- Major General, 30 April 2002
- Brigadier General, 2 March 1998
- Colonel, 5 December 1992
- Lieutenant Colonel, 16 August 1982
- Major, 16 March 1978
- Captain, 11 June 1972
- First Lieutenant, 12 December 1970
- Second Lieutenant, 11 June 1969
