= Louis W. Stotesbury =

US Army brigadier general

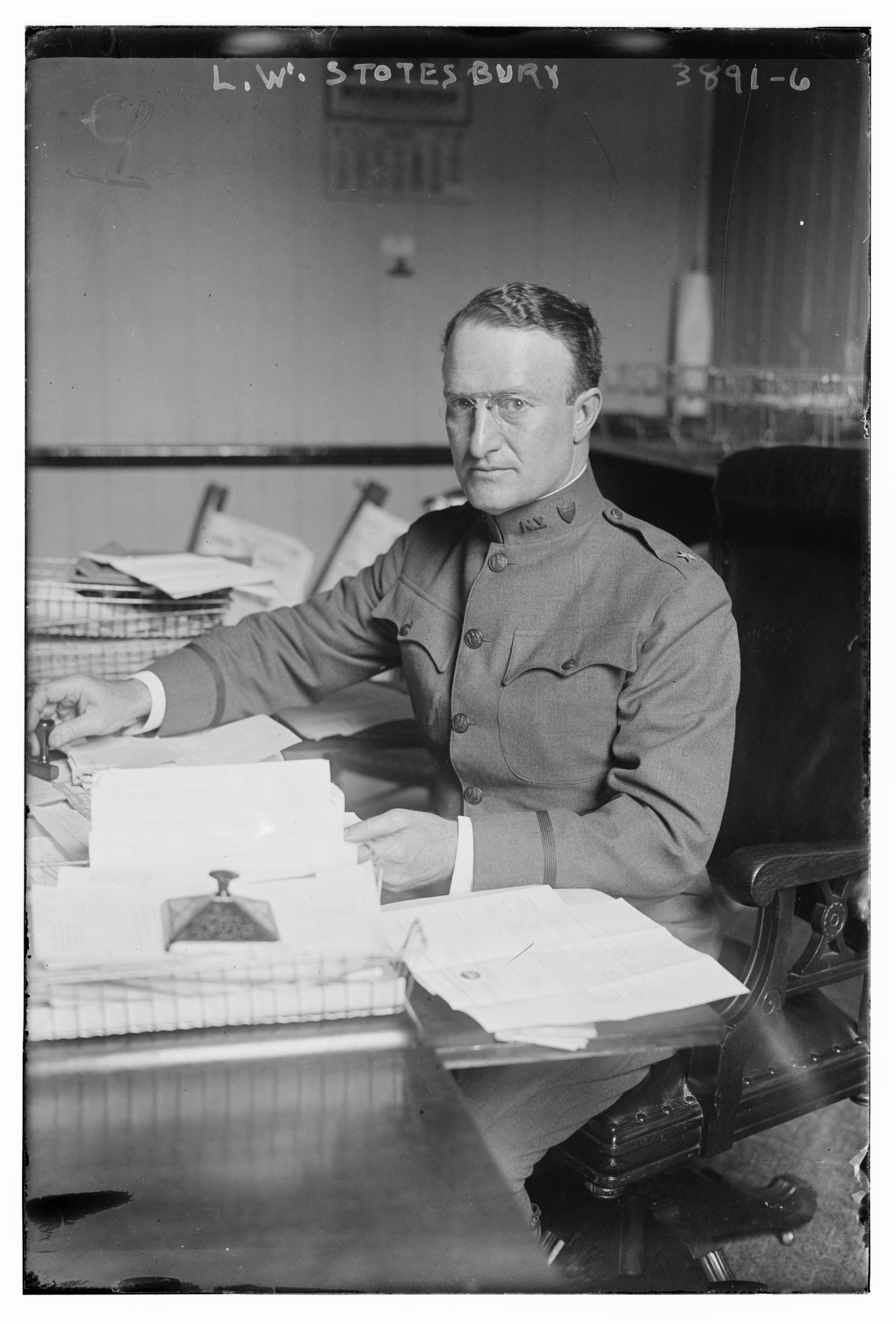
- Stotesbury while serving as New York's adjutant general in 1915
- Born: October 21, 1870; Fishkill-on-Hudson, New York, US
- Died: June 25, 1948 (aged 77); Manhattan, New York, US
- Burial place: Fishkill Rural Cemetery, Fishkill, New York, US
- Alma mater: Rutgers University; New York University School of Law
- Spouse: Helen Mathers Tompkins (m. 1897–1948)
- Children: 1
- Military career
- Service: New York National Guard; United States Army; Organized Reserve Corps
- Service years: 1891–1917 (National Guard); 1917–1919 (Army); 1919–1934 (Reserve)
- Rank: Brigadier General
- Service number: 0-133513
- Unit: U.S. Army Inspector General's Department
- Commands: Company F, 7th New York Infantry Regiment; Adjutant General of New York
- Wars: World War I
- Other work: Attorney

Louis W. Stotesbury (21 October 1870 – 25 June 1948) was an attorney and military officer from New York City. A veteran of World War I, he attained the rank of brigadier general while serving as Adjutant General of New York from 1915 to 1917.

A native of Fishkill-on-Hudson, New York (now Beacon, New York), Stotesbury graduated from Rutgers University with a B.S. in 1890 and New York University Law School with an LL.B. in 1892, afterwards practicing law in New York City. In 1893, Rutgers awarded him an MSc. degree.

Stotesbury joined the New York National Guard in 1891; he served in New York City's 7th Infantry Regiment until 1909 and advanced through the ranks from private to captain. In 1909, Stotesbury he was appointed to the staff of Governor Charles Evans Hughes, and in 1912 he was assigned to the New York National Guard's Inspector Department and promoted to lieutenant colonel. In 1915 he was named Adjutant General of New York by Governor Charles Whitman and promoted to brigadier general.

During World War I, Stotesbury resigned as adjutant general to join the Army for World War I. He accepted a commission as a major, serving first in the Inspector General's Department and later a position on the War Department planning staff. After the war, Stotesbury resumed practicing law and was commissioned as a lieutenant colonel in the Organized Reserve Corps. He was promoted to colonel in 1923, and served until retiring in 1934. In 1926 he was an unsuccessful Republican candidate for the US House of Representatives.

Stotesbury died in Manhattan on 25 June 1948. He was buried at Fishkill Rural Cemetery in Fishkill.

== Early life ==
Louis William Stotesbury was born in Fishkill-on-Hudson, New York (now Beacon, New York) on 21 October 1870, the son of Union Army veteran William Stotesbury Jr. (1839–1872) and Charlotte F. (Meyer) Stotesbury (1847–1876), who was known as "Lottie". William Stotesbury had participated in the sinking of CSS Albemarle and received a share of the prize money after she was raised, repaired, and sold. After his parents died, Stotesbury was raised by his aunt and uncle, Emma and Charles Stotesbury. Stotesbury was raised and educated in Beacon and attended the Newton Collegiate Institute of Newton, New Jersey.

In 1886, Stotesbury began attendance at Rutgers College, from which he received a Bachelor of Science degree in 1890. He then attended New York University School of Law; in 1917, he was awarded an LL.B. as of the Class of 1892. Stotesbury attained admission to the bar in 1892 and began to practice in New York City. In 1893, Rutgers awarded him the degree of MSc. In 1897, Stotesbury married Helen Mathers Tompkins. They were the parents of a daughter, Helen Mathers Stotesbury.

== Career ==
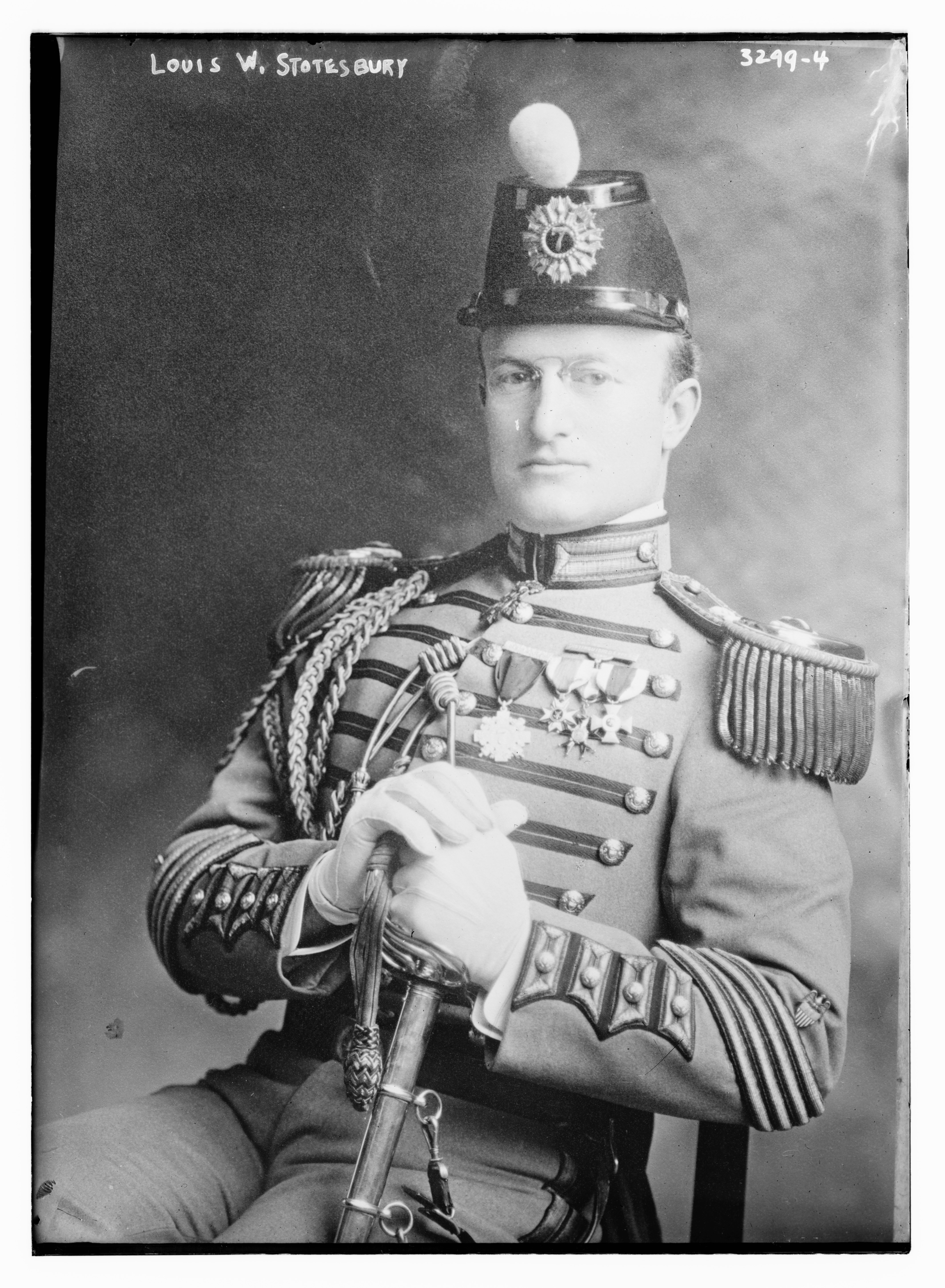
Stotesbury as a member of the 7th Infantry in 1910

In April 1892, Stotesbury began a military career when he joined the New York National Guard's Company F, 7th Infantry Regiment as a private. He was promoted to corporal in October 1893 and sergeant in January 1900. In March 1901, Stotesbury was elected a second lieutenant, and he held this rank until August 1905, when he was promoted to first lieutenant. In February 1906, he was elected commander of the company, and he received promotion to captain. Stotesbury maintained an interest in athletics and won several New York Athletic Club wrestling competitions. This interest also carried over to his National Guard activities; he won several individual shooting competitions, and his company won numerous team marksmanship contests. In addition, Stotesbury was regarded as the 7th Infantry's best horseman, and he organized and led a riding class for unit members who wanted to improve their skills.

In 1909, Stotesbury was appointed to the military staff of Governor Charles Evans Hughes as his aide-de-camp, and he continued in this position under Hughes's successor Horace White. In September 1912, he was appointed inspector general of the New York National Guard with the rank of lieutenant colonel. In 1915, Governor Charles Seymour Whitman appointed Stotesbury Adjutant General of New York and he was promoted to brigadier general.

== Later career ==
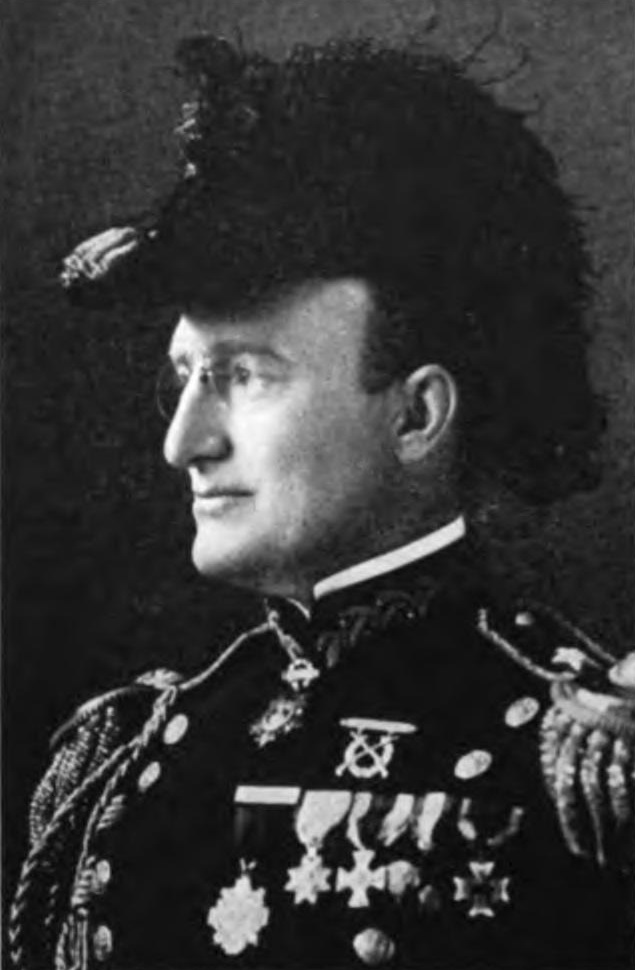
Stotesbury as a brigadier general in 1917

Following American entry into World War I in April 1917, Stotesbury resigned as adjutant general so he could volunteer for regular army service. Commissioned as a major, he was assigned to duty with the U.S. Army Inspector General's Department. Stotesbury was later assigned to the planning staff at the War Department. He remained in uniform until the Armistice of November 11, 1918 ended the war.

Following his wartime service, Stotesbury resumed the practice of law in New York City. In 1919, he was commissioned as a lieutenant colonel in the Organized Reserve Corps. He was promoted to colonel in 1923, and continued to serve in the inspector general's department. In 1924, he was appointed counsel of the New York State Transit Commission. In 1926, he was an unsuccessful Republican candidate for the United States House of Representatives. Stotesbury remained in the reserve until attaining the mandatory retirement age of 64 in 1934.

== Retirement and death ==
In addition to practicing law, Stotesbury served as a trustee of Rutgers College and the Newton Collegiate Institute. He was also a member of the Sons of the American Revolution, Sons of Union Veterans of the Civil War, Military Order of the Loyal Legion of the United States (hereditary), Military Service Institution of the United States, Naval Order of the United States, and 7th Infantry Regiment Veterans Association.

Stotesbury belonged to Fishkill's Dutch Reformed Church, the Delta Upsilon fraternity, Union League Club, Bankers Club of New York, Army and Navy Club of New York, University Club of New York, and Southern Dutchess Country Club. He died in Manhattan on 25 June 1948. Stotesbury was buried at Fishkill Rural Cemetery in Fishkill, New York.
