= Patrick A. Murphy =

Adjutant General of New York (2010–2016)

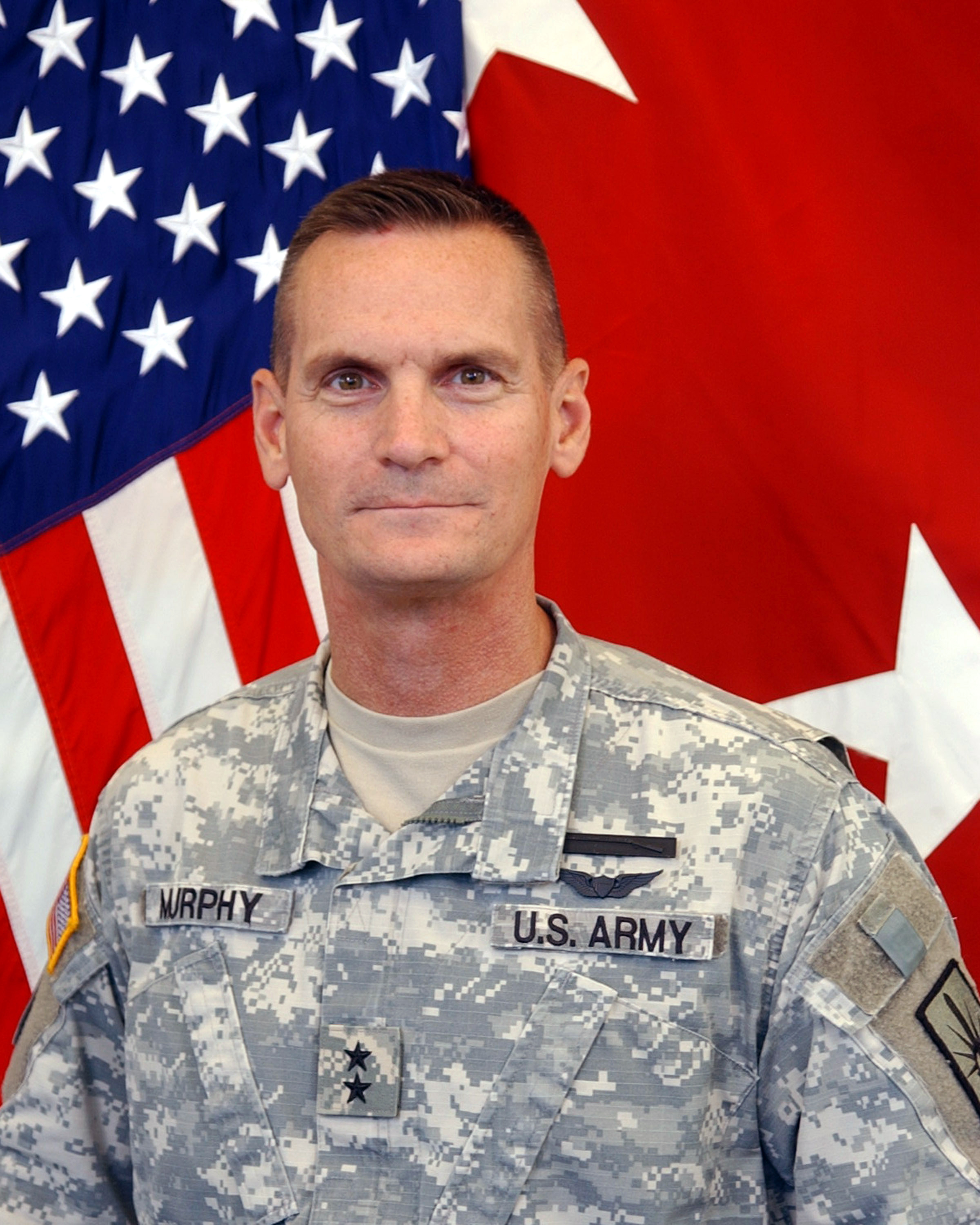
- Murphy as Adjutant General of New York in 2010
- Born: 1958 (age 67–68); Waterloo, Iowa, US
- Education: Iowa State University; Shippensburg University; United States Army Command and General Staff College; United States Army War College
- Spouse: Cheryl "Cherie" A. Liebe (m. 1991)
- Military career
- Service: United States Army
- Service years: 1977–2019
- Rank: Major General
- Units: Iowa Army National Guard; New York Army National Guard
- Commands: Company B, 1st Battalion, 133rd Infantry Regiment; 1st Battalion, 133rd Infantry Regiment; Adjutant General of New York
- Wars: Iraq War
- Awards: Bronze Star Medal; Defense Meritorious Service Medal (3); Army Meritorious Service Medal; Army Commendation Medal (3)
- Other work: Agronomist

Patrick A. Murphy (born 1958) is a retired United States Army officer. A longtime member of the Iowa Army National Guard and New York Army National Guard, he served from 1977 until retiring in 2019. Murphy attained the rank of major general, and his awards and decorations included the Bronze Star Medal, Defense Meritorious Service Medal, Army Meritorious Service Medal, and Army Commendation Medal. Murphy's command assignments included: Company B 1st Battalion, 133rd Infantry Regiment; 1st Battalion, 133rd Infantry Regiment; and Adjutant General of New York.

== Early life ==
Patrick Ambrose Murphy was born in Waterloo, Iowa in 1958, a son of Thomas W. Murphy and Carolyn R. (Gruman) Murphy. He was raised and educated in Dike, Iowa and graduated from Dike High School in 1976. Murphy joined the Iowa Army National Guard in 1977 and served as an enlisted soldier until completing Officer Candidate School in 1979. Murphy was commissioned as a second lieutenant of Infantry.

== Start of career ==
After receiving his commission, Murphy was assigned as support platoon leader with Headquarters and Headquarters Company, 1st Battalion, 133rd Infantry Regiment, a unit of the 47th Infantry Division that was based in Waterloo. From December 1979 to August 1982, he served as a rifle platoon leader with Company C, 1st Battalion, 133rd Infantry in Iowa Falls. In June 1982, Murphy was promoted to first lieutenant. From September 1982 to October 1983 he was assigned as weapons platoon leader with Company C, 1st Battalion, 133rd Infantry in Charles City. In December 1982, Murphy completed a Bachelor of Arts degree in agronomy at Iowa State University. After completing his degree, he pursued a civilian career as a research agronomist and later a sales manager with Pioneer Hi Bred International of Des Moines.

From November 1983 to November 1985, Murphy served as aero-scout team leader with Troop D, 1st Battalion, 194th Air Cavalry Squadron in Waterloo. Murphy qualified as a pilot on the OH-58 and UH-1 helicopters; he logged more than 400 flight hours and received the Basic Aviator Badge. From December 1985 to January 1989, he was assigned as commander of Company B, 1st Battalion, 133rd Infantry in Oelwein. In May 1986, he received promotion to captain. From February 1989 to February 1990 Murphy was assigned as personnel staff officer (S1) at Headquarters, 1st Battalion, 133rd Infantry. From March 1990 to September 1991 he was assistant plans, operations, and training officer (S3 (Air)) at Headquarters, 34th Infantry Brigade in Boone. In July 1991, Murphy, then a resident of West Branch, married Cheryl "Cherie" A. Liebe of Washington. He served as S3 at 1st Battalion, 133rd Infantry from October 1991 to December 1993. Murphy was promoted to major in February 1992.

=== Military education ===
Education and training Murphy completed during his career included:

- Infantry Officer Basic Course
- Infantry Officer Advanced Course
- United States Army Command and General Staff College
- United States Army War College (Master of Strategic Studies, 2000)
- Army Senior Leader Development Program-Basic (ASLDP-B)
- Syracuse University, Maxwell School of Citizenship and Public Affairs, National Security Leadership Course (NSLC)
- Army Senior Leader Development Program- Intermediate (ASLDP-I)
- The Judge Advocate General's Legal Center and School, Reserve Component – General Officer Legal Orientation Course (RC-GOLO)
- Army Senior Leader Development Program – Advanced (ASLDP-A)
- Harvard University, Harvard Kennedy School, General and Flag Officer Homeland Security Executive Seminar
- Army Strategic Education Program - Transition (ASEP-T)

== Continued career ==
Murphy served as executive officer of 1st Battalion, 133rd Infantry from January 1994 to October 1995. From November 1995 to December 1998 he commanded 1st Battalion, 133rd Infantry. In April 1996, Murphy was promoted to lieutenant colonel. From January to May 1999, Murphy served as executive officer of 2nd Brigade, 34th Infantry Division in Boone. He attended the United States Army War College in residence from June 1999 to June 2000 and graduated with a master of strategic studies degree. In 2000, he also received a Master of Arts degree in public administration from Shippensburg University. From July 2000 to September 2001, Murphy was assigned as antiterrorism and force protection officer on the United States Joint Forces Command staff in Norfolk, Virginia.

From October to November 2001, he served as chief of the Deliberate Plans Branch at the Joint Forces Command. From December 2001 to July 2003, he was director of operations (J3) on the staff of Joint Task Force – Civil Support at Fort Monroe, Virginia. In March 2002, he was promoted to colonel. From August 2003 to October 2004, he served as chief of the Civil Support Plans Division (J5) for United States Northern Command at Peterson Air Force Base, Colorado. Murphy took part in the Iraq War as assistant chief of staff for National Guard affairs on the staff of United States Army Central at Camp Arifjan, Kuwait from November 2004 to June 2007.

== Later career ==
In July 2007, Murphy joined the New York Army National Guard and was assigned as director of the joint staff at Joint Force Headquarters – New York in Latham. In February 2008, he was promoted to brigadier general. During his service in New York, Murphy resided in Clifton Park. From February 2010 to March 2016, Murphy served as Adjutant General of New York, succeeding Joseph J. Taluto. He was promoted to major general in December 2010. After being succeeded as adjutant general by Anthony P. German, from April 2016 to December 2017, he was assigned as director of Strategic Plans and Policy and International Affairs (J5) at the National Guard Bureau headquarters in Arlington, Virginia. Murphy was director of the National Guard Bureau Joint Staff from January 2017 to September 2018. From October 2018 until his February 2019 retirement, Murphy was a special assistant to the Vice Chief of the National Guard Bureau. From 2019 to 2021, Murphy served as commissioner of New York's Division of Homeland Security and Emergency Services.

== Awards ==
Murphy's awards and decorations included:

- Bronze Star Medal
- Defense Meritorious Service Medal with 2 bronze oak leaf clusters
- Meritorious Service Medal
- Army Commendation Medal with 2 bronze oak leaf clusters
- Army Achievement Medal
- Joint Meritorious Unit Award with 2 bronze oak leaf clusters
- Army Superior Unit Award
- Army Reserve Component Achievement Medal with 1 silver oak leaf cluster and 2 bronze oak leaf clusters
- National Defense Service Medal with 1 bronze service star
- Global War on Terrorism Expeditionary Medal
- Global War on Terrorism Service Medal
- Armed Forces Reserve Medal with gold hourglass and "M" device
- Army Service Ribbon
- Overseas Service Ribbon
- Expert Infantryman Badge
- Army Aviator Badge

== Dates of rank ==
Murphy's dates of rank were:

- Major General, 22 December 2010
- Brigadier General, 29 February 2008
- Colonel, 18 March 2002
- Lieutenant Colonel, 3 April 1996
- Major, 19 February 1992
- Captain, 1 May 1986
- First Lieutenant, 30 June 1982
- Second Lieutenant, 1 July 1979
- Enlisted service, 1977 to 1979
