= Edward M. Hoffman =

American businessman and military officer from New York

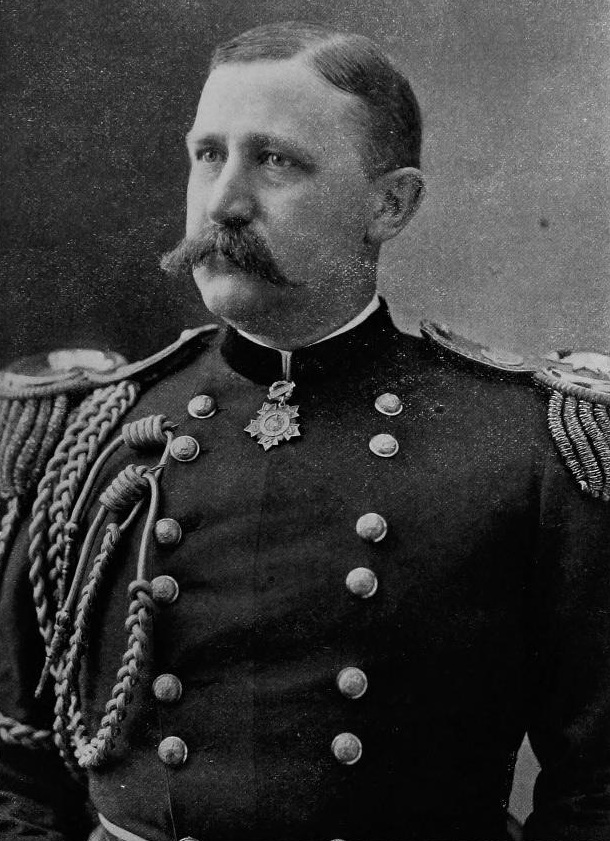
- From 1903's New York and the War with Spain: History of the Empire State Regiments
- Born: 14 January 1857; Elmira, New York, US
- Died: 15 May 1901 (aged 44); Albany, New York, US
- Burial place: Woodlawn Cemetery, Elmira, New York, US
- Spouse: Gabrielle Brooks (m. 1882–1901)
- Children: 2
- Military career
- Service: United States Army
- Service years: 1874–1901
- Rank: Brigadier General
- Units: New York National Guard; United States Volunteers
- Commands: 30th Separate Company; 3rd New York Infantry Regiment; Adjutant General of New York
- Wars: Spanish–American War
- Other work: Farmer; Owner, fruit tree and flower nursery

Edward M. Hoffman (14 January 1857 – 15 May 1901) was an American businessman and military officer from Elmira, New York. A farmer who later developed a successful fruit tree and flower nursery in partnership with his brother, Hoffman was also a career member of the New York National Guard. A veteran of the Spanish–American War, Hoffman attained the rank of brigadier general when he was appointed Adjutant General of New York, a position in which he was still serving when he died.

== Early life ==
Edward Morris Hoffman was born in Elmira, New York on 14 January 1857, a son of George W. Hoffman and Sarah (Bowman) Hoffman. He was raised and educated in Elmira, then attended Riverview Military Academy in Poughkeepsie, New York. As a teenager, he worked on his father's farm, and he later worked as a shipping clerk for the Delaware, Lackawanna and Western Express Company.

== Civilian career ==
Hoffman left his clerk's job to partner with his brother, Harry, in a commercial nursery that raised flowers and fruit trees. The nursery business proved successful, and went on to include several Hoffman family members in executive and management positions.

Hoffman was active in other enterprises, including serving on the board of directors of the Elmira State Bank. A Republican, in 1888 he accepted the party's nomination for Chemung County's seat in the New York State Assembly after the original nominee withdrew; he lost the general election to Robert P. Bush. In the mid-1890s, Hoffman was a member of Elmira's board of police commissioners and the city's acting chief of police. In 1896, he was the unsuccessful Republican nominee for mayor.

== Military career ==
Hoffman was 17 years old in October 1874 when he joined the New York National Guard, enlisting as a private in Company D, 110th Infantry Battalion The company was later reorganized as the 30th Separate Company, and in April 1877 Hoffman received his commission as a second lieutenant. In the summer of 1877, Hoffman's unit was called up in response to the Great Railroad Strike of 1877 and performed duty in Elmira and Hornellsville. In December 1881, he was assigned as assistant adjutant of New York's 7th Brigade and received promotion to lieutenant colonel. The brigade headquarters was disbanded in 1885, and in 1886 Hoffman rejoined the 30th Separate Company as a first lieutenant. In September 1889, Hoffman was promoted to captain and appointed to command of the company. In 1892, his company was included in the National Guard's response to a railroad firemen's strike in Buffalo, New York.

Frank S. Black became governor in 1897 and appointed Hoffman to his military staff as inspector general. At the start of the Spanish–American War in April 1898, Black commissioned him as a colonel and appointed him to command the 3rd New York Infantry Regiment. The regiment was activated for federal service, and Hoffman led the organization during its organization and training at Camp Black near the town of Hempstead and Camp Alger near Falls Church, Virginia. The war ended before the 3rd New York could deploy for service in Cuba, and it was inactivated at the end of the war.

== Later life ==
Following his wartime service, Hoffman resumed his service as the New York National Guard's inspector general. In January 1900, Governor Theodore Roosevelt appointed Hoffman to succeed Avery D. Andrews as Adjutant General of New York and he was promoted to brigadier general. He was reappointed by Governor Benjamin Odell in 1901 and served until his death.

== Death ==
Hoffman died in his Albany, New York hotel room while discussing the National Guard's potential response to a city motormen's strike with National Guard division commander Charles F. Roe. Hoffman was buried at Woodlawn Cemetery in Elmira. He was succeeded as adjutant general by Frederick Phisterer.

== Sources ==
- Cutter, William Richard (1924). American Biography: A New Cyclopedia. Vol. XVIII. New York: The American Historical Society. p. 332 – via Google Books.
