= Frederick Phisterer =

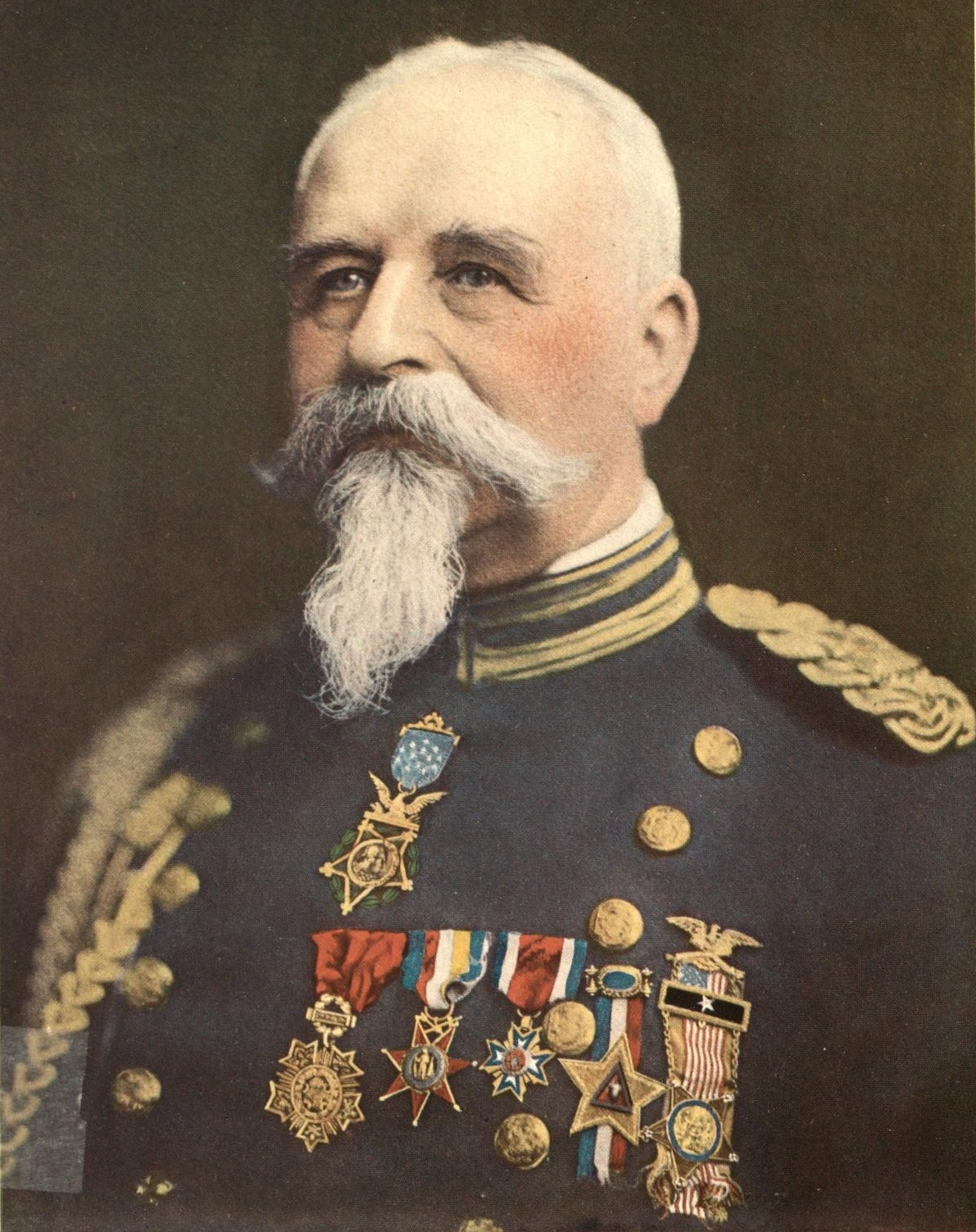
- Frontispiece of 1912's New York in the War of the Rebellion, by Frederick Phisterer.
- Born: October 11, 1836; Stuttgart, Kingdom of Württemberg
- Died: July 13, 1909 (aged 72); Albany, New York
- Burial place: Green Lawn Cemetery, Columbus, Ohio
- Military career
- Allegiance: United States of America
- Branch: United States Army
- Service years: 1855–1860, 1861–1870
- Rank: Captain
- Unit: 18th Infantry Regiment
- Conflicts: Battle of Stones River; American Civil War
- Awards: Medal of Honor

Frederick Phisterer (October 11, 1836 – July 13, 1909) was a German immigrant, American soldier, and writer who fought for the United States in the American Civil War. Phisterer received the Medal of Honor, his country's highest award for bravery during combat. On December 12, 1894, Phisterer was recognized for actions at the Battle of Stones River at Murfreesboro, Tennessee in December 1862 and January 1863; the site of the fighting is now the Stones River National Battlefield.

== Biography ==
Phisterer was born in Stuttgart, Kingdom of Württemberg. He joined the Army from Medina County, Ohio, in December 1855, and served in the 3rd Artillery Regiment for 5 years. He re-enlisted with the 18th Infantry Regiment in July 1861, and was commissioned as an officer the following October. He eventually rose to the rank of captain, and was honorably discharged in August 1870.

He was a longtime officer of the New York Militia, and played a large role in the militia's reorganization as part of the National Guard. He attained the rank of colonel, and was promoted to the brevet rank of brigadier general for his service to organize and train soldiers for the Spanish–American War. He acted as New York's Adjutant General in 1901 and 1902, following the death of Edward M. Hoffman, and was succeeded by Nelson H. Henry. Phisterer was promoted to brevet major general at his retirement as recognition of his many years of successful service.

General Phisterer was a companion of the New York Commandery of the Military Order of the Loyal Legion of the United States and a member of the Order of Indian Wars of the United States.

He died in Albany, New York, and was buried at Green Lawn Cemetery, Columbus, Ohio.

== Medal of Honor citation ==
The President of the United States of America, in the name of Congress, takes pleasure in presenting the Medal of Honor to First Lieutenant (Infantry) Frederick Phisterer, United States Army, for extraordinary heroism on 31 December 1862, while serving with 18th U.S. Infantry, in action at Stone River, Tennessee. First Lieutenant Phisterer voluntarily conveyed, under a heavy fire, information to the commander of a battalion of regular troops by which the battalion was saved from capture or annihilation.

== Bibliography ==
- The Regular Brigade of the Fourteenth Army Corps, the Army of the Cumberland, in the battle of Stone River, or Murfreesboro, Tennessee, from December 31st, 1862, to January 3d, 1863 (1883)
- Statistical Record of the Armies of the United States (1883)
- New York in the War of Rebellion, 1861-1865 (1912)

== See also ==
- List of American Civil War Medal of Honor recipients: M–P
