= New York State Division of Military and Naval Affairs =

Part of the state Executive Department

Division of Military and Naval Affairs
- Seal

- Logo

Agency overview
- Jurisdiction: New York
- Agency executive: MG Raymond F. Shields Jr., Adjutant General
- Parent department: New York State Executive Department
- Key document: Executive Law
- Website: dmna.ny.gov

The New York State Division of Military and Naval Affairs (NYS DMNA) is responsible for the state's New York Army National Guard, New York Air National Guard, New York Guard and the New York Naval Militia. It is headed by Adjutant General of New York Major General Raymond F. Shields Jr., appointed on October 1, 2018. with the governor of New York Kathy Hochul serving as Commander in Chief of the state's militia forces. It is part of the New York State Executive Department.

All of the armories in New York State are run directly or indirectly by the Division of Military and Naval Affairs. The DMNA headquarters, located in Latham, New York near Albany, is within 8 miles of both the Knolls Atomic Power Laboratory and the General Electric Research and Development facility in Niskayuna, New York.

== New York National Guard ==
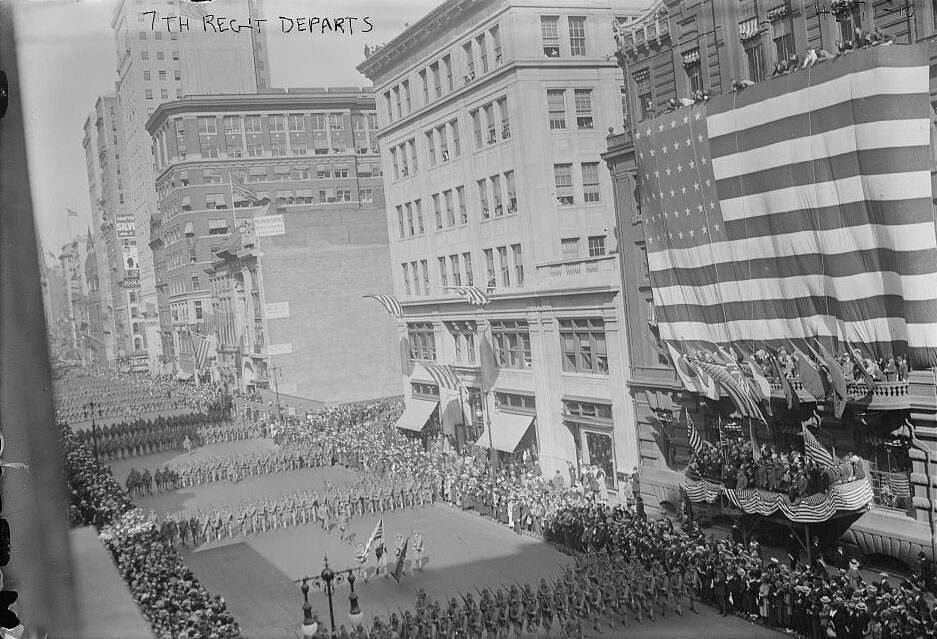
Troops of the 7th Regiment, New York National Guard, later the 107th Infantry Regiment, marching off to war on September 11, 1917

The Constitution of the United States specifically charges the "Militia of the Several States," now embodied as the National Guard, with dual federal and state missions. In fact, the National Guard is the only United States military force empowered to function in a state status. Those functions range from limited actions during non-emergency situations to full scale law enforcement of martial law when local law enforcement officials can no longer maintain civil control.

The New York National Guard consists of the New York Army National Guard and the New York Air National Guard.

The governor may call individuals or units of the New York National Guard into service during emergencies or to assist in special situations which lend themselves to use of the National Guard. The state mission assigned to the National Guard is: "To provide trained and disciplined forces for domestic emergencies or as otherwise provided by state law."

The National Guard may be called into federal service in response to a call by the president or Congress.

When National Guard troops are called to federal service, the president serves as Commander-in-Chief. The federal mission assigned to the National Guard is: "To provide properly trained and equipped units for prompt mobilization for war, National emergency or as otherwise needed."

New York Air National Guardsmen performing a hurricane rescue in 2017

Unlike United States Army Reserve members, National Guard members cannot be mobilized individually (except through voluntary transfers and Temporary Duty Assignments (TDYs), but only as part of their respective units. However, there have been a significant number of individual activations to support military operations after the September 11 terrorist attacks; the legality of this policy is a major issue within the National Guard.

== New York Guard ==
The state defense force of New York is the New York Guard, a military entity authorized by both the State Code of New York and executive order. The New York Guard is the state's authorized militia and assumes the state mission of the New York National Guard in the event the Guard is mobilized. The New York Guard comprises a large number of retired active and reserve military personnel and selected professionals who volunteer their time and talents in further service to their state.

NY had an active organization called the NY State Reserve Defense Force (defunct in 2011), led by a retired US Army Brigadier General, that operated similar to the NY Guard and performed funeral honor guard, disaster response, volunteer event security services, operated a year-round 500 bed homeless shelter, and performed other duties between 2003 and 2011, until it ceased operations due to the inability to obtain state/federal/grant funding and legislative recognition. The NY SRDF performed honor guard services at more than 80 funerals, responded to more than 30 local disasters/incidents, and provided event security services at more than 125 events. The NY SRDF was made up of licensed security guards, military veterans, volunteer fire/EMS personnel, doctors, chefs, and other professionals who sought to serve their local communities. Members wore a navy-blue mess dress uniform with gold buttons and trouser stripes for formal occasions, a similar navy-blue class A dress uniform for funerals, and grey tactical uniforms for disaster response and event security services. The NY SRDF had over 250 members before it ceased operations.

== New York Naval Militia ==
The New York Naval Militia is the naval militia of New York, and serves as the naval equivalent of the National Guard. As a federally-recognized naval militia, 95% of members of the naval militia must also be members of the United States Navy Reserve or the United States Marine Corps Reserve. Since 1997, New York has allowed members of the United States Coast Guard Reserve to join the naval militia as well.

== Previous Chiefs of Staff to the Governor ==
Karl F. Hausauer, Major General, circ. 1949

== New York Aid to Civil Authority Medal ==
New York Aid to Civil Authority Medal
- Type: Medal
- Country: United States of America
- Presented by: (New York (state)) New York National Guard
- Status: Currently awarded
- Website: https://dmna.ny.gov/
- New York Aid to Civil Authority Ribbon

Precedence
- Next (higher): New York Recruiting Medal
- Next (lower): New York Counterdrug Service Ribbon

The New York Aid to Civil Authority Medal is an award of the State of New York given to the New York State Organized Militia. The New York Aid to Civil Authority Ribbon is awarded any member of the New York Organized Militia who performs any period of state active duty.

For each succeeding award, a medal device (shield) will be attached to the suspension ribbon and service ribbon. These devices shall be:

Silver (to represent one additional award) gold (to represent five additional awards)

== New York Counterdrug Service Ribbon ==
New York Counterdrug Service Ribbon
- New York Counterdrug Ribbon
- Type: Ribbon
- Country: United States of America
- Presented by: (New York (state)) New York National Guard
- Eligibility: The Counterdrug Service Ribbon may be awarded to any member of the New York State Organized Militia who is ordered to duty in support of a counterdrug mission for thirty cumulative days.
- Status: Currently awarded
- Established: March 1, 1994
- Website: https://dmna.ny.gov/

Precedence
- Next (higher): New York Aid to Civil Authority Medal
- Next (lower): New York Exercise Support Ribbon

The New York Counterdrug Ribbon is an award of the New York National Guard. The New York Counterdrug Ribbon is awarded to any member of the New York State Organized Militia who satisfactorily completes thirty days of service related to counter-drug operations. Time spent at the National Interagency Counterdrug Institute does not count towards this award's eligibility requirement.

== New York Exercise Support Ribbon ==
New York Exercise Support Ribbon
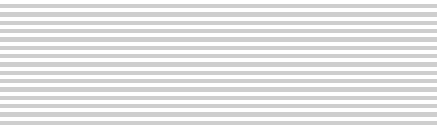
- Type: Ribbon bar
- Awarded for: No less than three days of field service in military exercises directed by the Joint Chiefs of Staff.
- Country: United States of America
- Presented by: (New York (state)) New York State Organized Militia
- Eligibility: Any New York National Guard member
- Status: Currently awarded
- First award: January 1, 1979
- Final award: Ongoing
- Website: https://dmna.ny.gov/

Precedence
- Next (higher): New York Counterdrug Service Ribbon
- Next (lower): Humane Service to New York State Medal

The New York Exercise Support Ribbon is a decoration of the state of New York awarded to members of the New York National Guard. The New York Exercise Support Ribbon is awarded to members of the New York Army National Guard and New York Air National Guard who participate in military exercises directed by the Joint Chiefs of Staff. Subsequent awards of this ribbon are denoted by a silver 'E' device worn on the ribbon; groups of five awards are represented by gold 'E' devices.
