= Plattekill Mountain =

Ski resort in Roxbury, New York, USA

- Plattekill's runs and lodge as seen from the mountain base.
- Interactive map of Plattekill Mountain
- Nearest city: Roxbury, New York
- Coordinates: 42.290251°N 74.653678°W
- Status: Operating
- Vertical: 1,100 feet (340 m)
- Top elevation: 3,500 ft (1,100 m)
- Base elevation: 2,400 ft (730 m)
- Trails: 40
- Terrain parks: 1
- Snowfall: 175 in (4.4 m)
- Snowmaking: 75%
- Night skiing: No
- Website: http://plattekill.com/

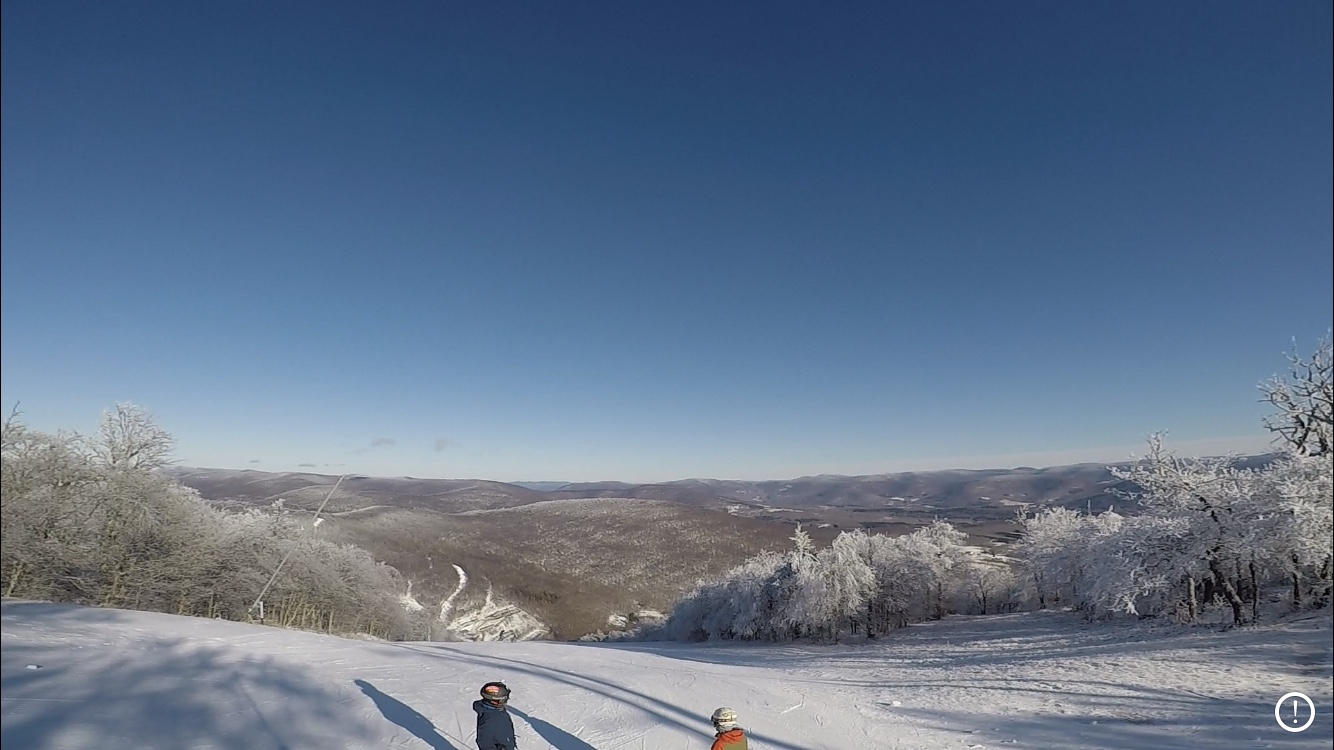
Plattekill North Face Trail view

Plattekill Mountain is a privately owned and operated ski resort northwest of Catskill Park in the town of Roxbury, New York. It features a vertical drop of 1,100 feet (340 meters) with 40 trails of varying degrees of difficulty. The mountain offers skiing, snowboarding and snowtubing.

The main lodge is located at 2400' elevation with the highest peak reaching an elevation of 3500'. The resort has amenities such as a cafeteria, bar, retail shop, equipment rentals, ski and snowboard school, day lockers and fireplaces/stoves on each of its 3 levels.

There are two ski lifts accessing the mountain's peaks and two surface lifts, one at the beginner area and one in the snowtubing park.

== History ==
Between the late 1950s and the early 1990s Plattekill Mountain was owned and operated by the Hinkley family. During those 33 years the ski center gained the reputation of having some of the steepest and most challenging terrain in the region. After a number of warm and dry ski seasons - and following a costly real-estate development project that had failed - the property went into foreclosure and ownership was taken over briefly by the Small Business Administration in 1992.

By 1993 there were a number of parties interested in buying Plattekill Mountain - and on April 30, 1993, the property was purchased for an undisclosed amount via a sealed bid by Mr. Lászlo Vajtay who was a former instructor and life-long skier at Plattekill Mountain.

Over the years the mountain has undergone numerous improvements including modernization of its existing snow making systems and grooming equipment as well as the installation of a Hall Double Chair that originally was installed in 1977 at nearby Belleayre Mountain to replace an aging Hall T-bar, which had been installed in 1961.

Today the resort operates year-round as a ski area in the winter and, in summer, has become a popular venue for weddings, private parties and events. Telemark skiing is also popular at the mountain.

== Statistics ==
- Base: 2,400 ft (730 m)
- Summit: 3,500 ft (1,070 m)
- Vertical drop: 1,100 ft (340 m)
- Number of Trails: 40, beginner 20% intermediate 40% advanced 20% expert 20%

== Trails and glades ==
Name of trail	Rating
Upper Powder Puff	
Lower Powder Puff	
Crossover	
Beginner Learning Center	
Express Lane	
Rascal's Flats	
Overlook	

Name of trail	Rating
Sundown	
Bail Out	
Lower Ridge	
Lower Northface	
Gateway	
Shredded Mozzarella	
Lower Face	
Drop In	
Lower Twist	
Cat Track	
Just Do It	
I Think I Can	
Backdraft	
Switchback	
Buckle Up	
Horse Shoe	
Home Run	
Wing It	

Name of trail	Rating
Upper Ridge Run	
Upper Twist	
The Cliffs	
Bumps	
Upper Face	
Lower Plunge	
The Chute	

Name of trail	Rating
Freefall	
Upper Northface	
Pipeline	
Upper Plunge	
Blockbuster	
Giant Slalom	
Rocket	
TERRAIN PARK on Lower Face	
