= C. Whitney Tillinghast 2nd =

Adjutant general of New York

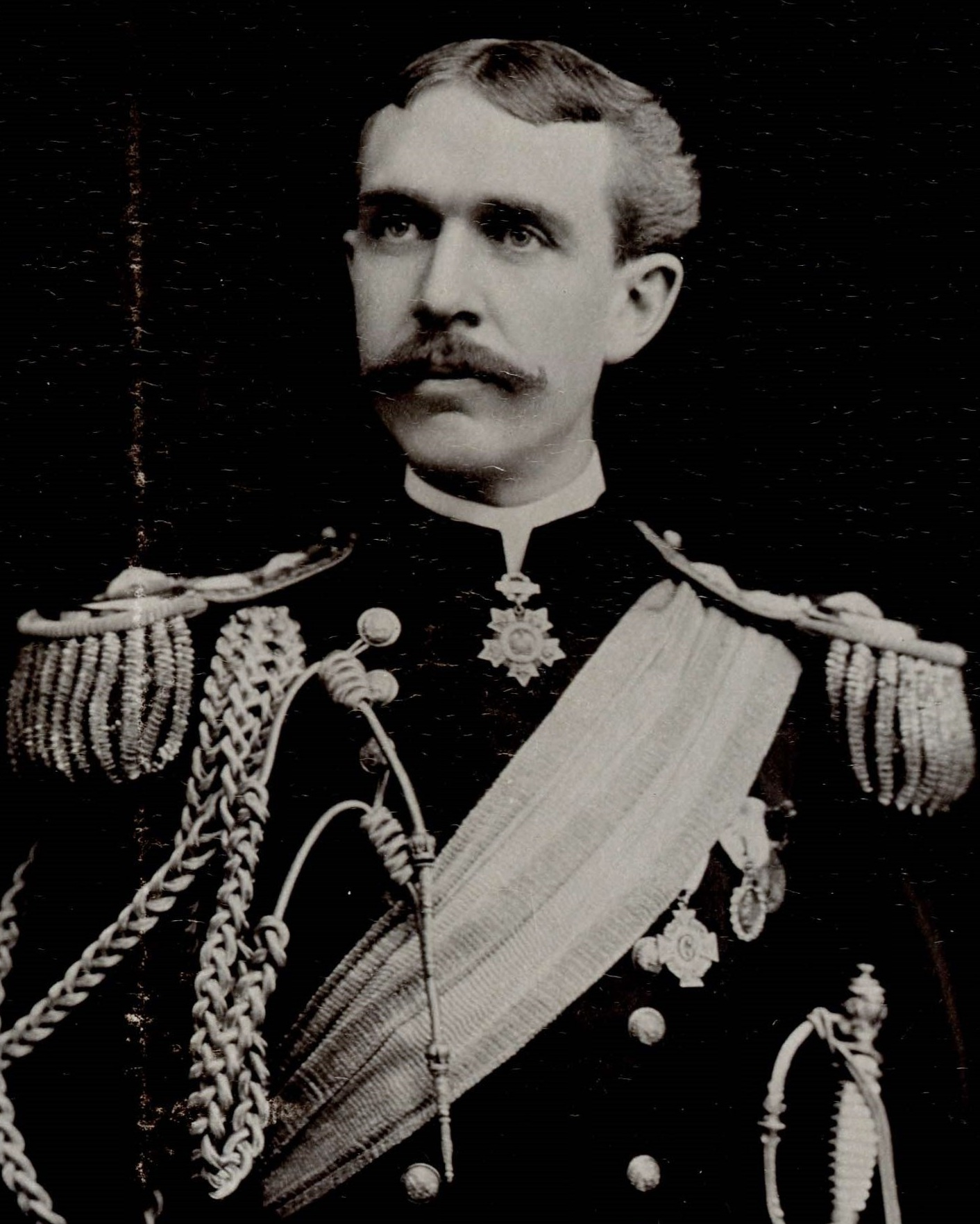
- Tillinghast in 1897
- Born: 28 November 1857; Troy, New York, US
- Died: 27 December 1913 (aged 56); Troy, New York, US
- Burial place: Oakwood Cemetery, Troy, New York, US
- Education: Trinity College (Connecticut) (attended)
- Spouse: Marion Chittenden Clark (m. 1889–1913)
- Children: 4
- Military career
- Service: New York National Guard
- Service years: 1877–1895; 1897–1898
- Rank: Major General
- Unit: 6th Separate Company
- Commands: Adjutant General of New York
- Wars: Spanish–American War
- Other work: Businessman

C. Whitney Tillinghast 2nd (28 November 1857 – 27 December 1913) was an American businessman and military officer from Troy, New York. A longtime member of the New York National Guard, he served as Adjutant General of New York from 1897 to 1898.

== Early life and career ==
Charles Whitney Tillinghast 2nd was born in Troy, New York on 28 November 1857, a son of Thomas Allen Tillinghast and Margaret Scott (Griffith) Tillinghast. Tillinghast was named for his uncle Charles Whitney Tillinghast, a Troy businessman who was born in 1824 and died in 1910. Tillinghast attended the academy in Troy, The Frederick Gunn School in Washington, Connecticut, and St. Paul's School in Concord, New Hampshire.

Tillinghast attended Trinity College in Hartford, Connecticut but left before graduating because of ill health. He traveled extensively in Europe to recuperate, then returned to Troy to begin a business career. He joined Joseph M. Warren's J. M. Warren & Co., a supplier of iron and steel tools and materials for railroad and building construction. Tillinghast's uncle Joseph J. Tillinghast was the company's vice president; when Joseph Tillinghast died in 1897, Tillinghast succeeded him.

In addition to his business career, Tillinghast was active in Troy's local government and civic life. He was a longtime member of the volunteer fire department, a member and president of Troy's Young Men's Association, and a member and president of the Pafraets Dael Club, founded as a community hub for the city's leading businessmen and government officials. (Note: Pafraets Dael ("Pafraet's Dale") was the original Dutch name for the area where Troy was later founded. It was named by manor lord Kiliaen van Rensselaer to honor his mother Maria Pafraet.) His other memberships included the board of trustees of the Troy Orphan Asylum, Sons of the Revolution, Troy Club, Van Schaick Island Golf Club, and Fort Orange Club of Albany.

== Military career ==
Tillinghast was a member of the New York National Guard beginning in 1877. A member of the Troy-based 6th Separate Company, he began his career as a private and received his commission as a second lieutenant in 1891. He was promoted to first lieutenant in 1893 and served until retiring in 1895. Tillinghast was a Republican in politics and a longtime friend and associate of Frank S. Black; when Black took office as governor in 1897, he appointed Tillinghast Adjutant General of New York with the rank of major general. Tillinghast was adjutant general during the Spanish–American War and played a central role in organizing the state's National Guard units and United States Volunteers for wartime service. Black was not a candidate for reelection in 1898, and Tillinghast left the National Guard at the end of Black's term on 31 December.

Among Tillinghast's military-related memberships were the Army and Navy Club of New York City, Soldiers' and Sailors' Monument Association of Rensselaer County (vice president), and Military Order of Foreign Wars. He was also a member of the Military Service Institution of the United States and a trustee of the Grant Monument Association. Tillinghast died in Troy on 27 December 1913. He was buried at Oakwood Cemetery in Troy.

== Dates of rank ==
Tillinghast's dates of rank were:

- Private, 5 June 1877
- Corporal, 8 February 1879
- Sergeant, 1 December 1887
- Second Lieutenant, 6 May 1891
- First Lieutenant, 10 April 1893
- First Lieutenant (Retired), 15 January 1894
- Major General, 1 January 1897
- Major General (Retired), 31 December 1898
