= Raymond F. Shields Jr. =

Adjutant general of New York since 2018

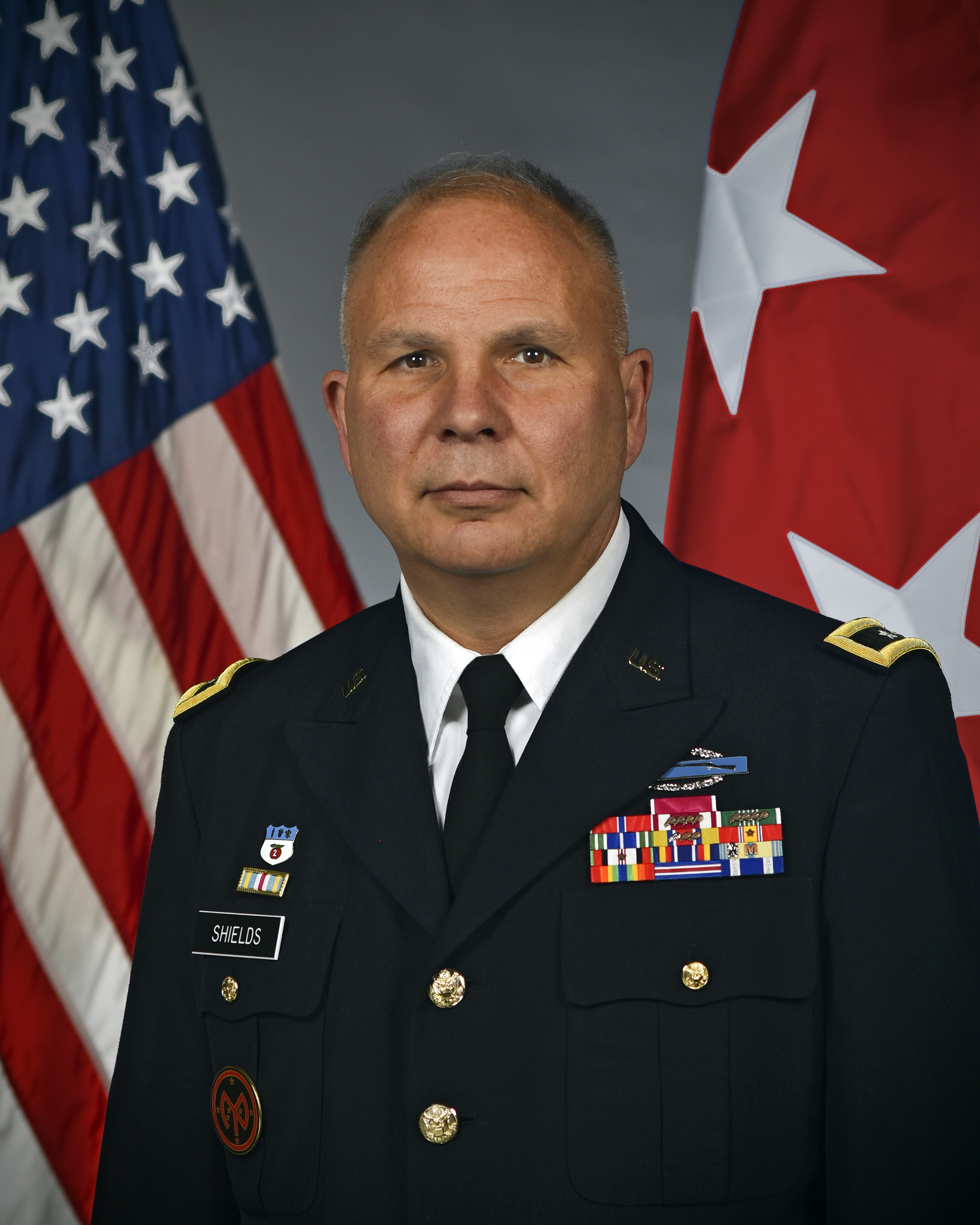
- 2018 National Guard Bureau photo
- Born: 1963 (age 62–63); Richmond, Virginia, US
- Education: Marion Military Institute; University at Albany; Marist University; United States Army Command and General Staff College; United States Army War College
- Military career
- Service: United States Army
- Service years: 1981–present
- Rank: Major General
- Unit: US Army Infantry Branch
- Commands: Headquarters and Headquarters Company, 2nd Battalion, 105th Infantry Regiment; Company B, 1st Battalion, 105th Infantry Regiment; Company C, 1st Battalion, 105th Infantry Regiment; 2nd Battalion, 108th Infantry Regiment; 106th Regiment (Regional Training Institute); Adjutant General of New York
- Wars: War in Afghanistan
- Awards: Legion of Merit; Bronze Star Medal; Meritorious Service Medal (5); Army Commendation Medal (5); Army Achievement Medal; Complete List

Raymond F. Shields Jr. (born 1963) is a career United States Army officer from New York. A veteran of the War in Afghanistan, he has served since 1981. Shields was promoted to major general in 2017, and his awards include the Legion of Merit, Bronze Star Medal, five awards of the Meritorious Service Medal, five awards of the Army Commendation Medal, and the Army Achievement Medal. Since 2018, Shields has been assigned as the Adjutant General of New York.

== Early life ==
Raymond Francis Shields Jr. was born in Richmond, Virginia in 1963, the son of Raymond F. Shields Sr. and Alice M. Shields. He was raised in Upstate New York and is a 1981 graduate of Columbia High School in East Greenbush. After high school, Shields attended Marion Military Institute (MMI), from which he received an Associate of Arts degree in 1983. While at MMI, Shields served as an enlisted soldier in the United States Army Reserve and was assigned to the 75th Combat Support Hospital in Tuscaloosa, Alabama. Shields also completed the Army Reserve Officers' Training Corps program at Marion, and upon graduation he received his commission as a second lieutenant.

== Civilian and military education ==
In 1986, Shields received a Bachelor of Arts degree in history from the University at Albany. In 2000, he received a Master of Public Administration degree from Marist University. Shields received his National Security Management Certificate from Syracuse University's Maxwell School in 2011. In 2015, he completed the General/Flag Officer Homeland Security Executive Seminar at Harvard University's Kennedy School of Government.

Shields completed the Infantry Officer Basic Course in 1986. He later completed the Infantry Officer Advanced Course, after which he attended the United States Army Command and General Staff College. In 2006, he received a Master of Strategic Studies degree from the United States Army War College. Shields completed the Senior Executive Seminar at the George C. Marshall European Center for Security Studies in 2013. In 2014, he graduated from the National Guard Bureau's Army Strategic Leadership Development Program – Basic. Also in 2014, he completed the National Guard Bureau's Senior Executive Diversity Awareness Training.

== Early career ==
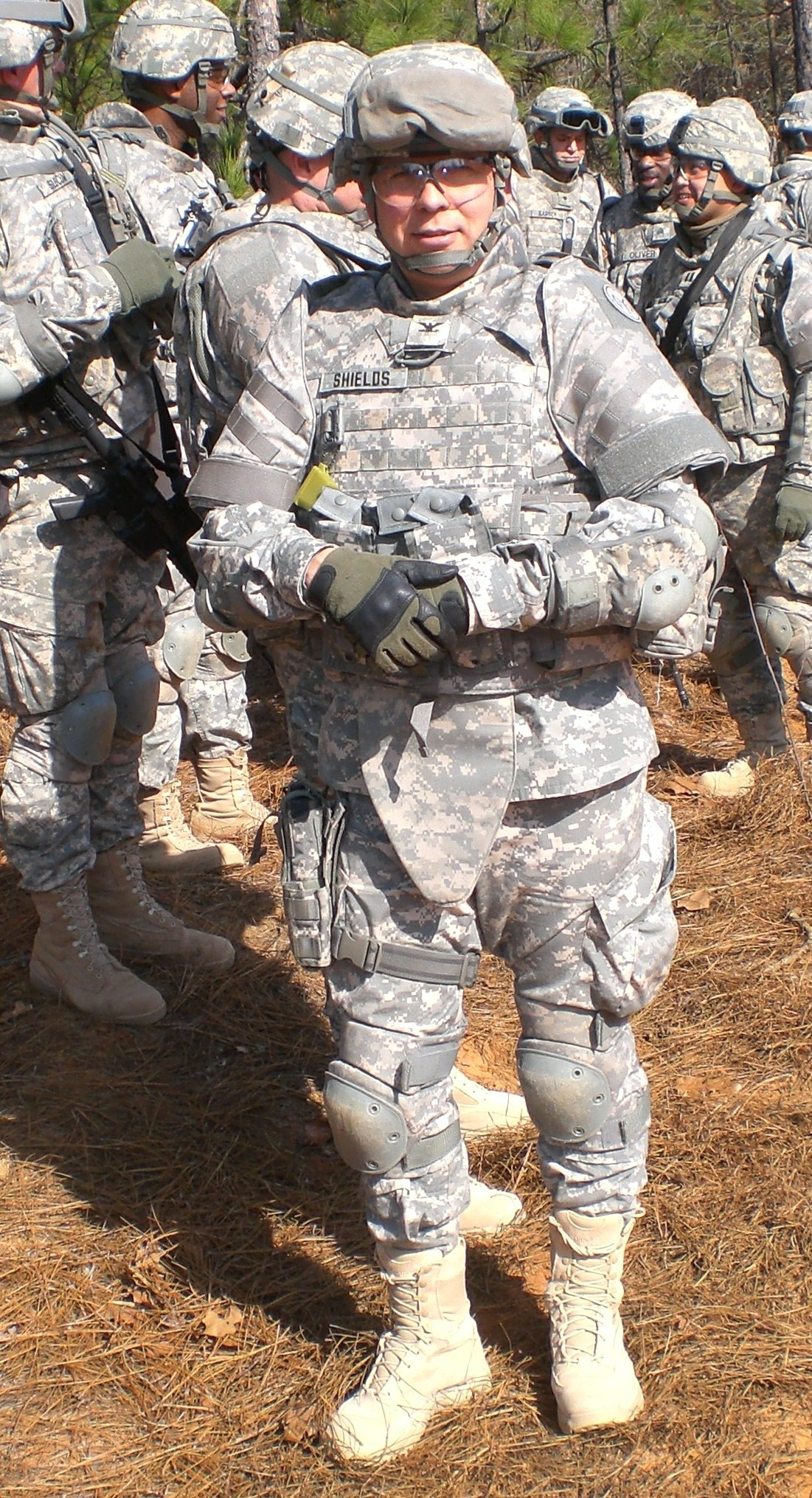
Shields as a colonel c. 2009

Shields is a longtime member of the New York Army National Guard's full-time workforce. From May 1983 to April 1985, he was assigned as a platoon leader with Troy's Headquarters and Headquarters Company, 205th Support Group. From April 1985 to December 1986, he was the executive officer of Headquarters and Headquarters Company, 1st Brigade, 42nd Infantry Division, also in Troy. From December 1986 to May 1989, he was assigned as aide-de-camp for the assistant division commander of the 42nd Infantry Division in Manhattan. He served as signal officer on the staff of 2nd Battalion, 105th Infantry Regiment in Troy from June 1989 to October 1989. From October 1989 to June 1990, Shields commanded Headquarters and Headquarters Company, 2nd Battalion, 105th Infantry in Troy.

In July 1990, Shields was assigned as logistics staff officer on the staff of 1st Brigade, 42nd Infantry Division in Troy, but in August 1990 he was assigned to command Company B, 1st Battalion, 105th Infantry, in Morrisonville. In June 1991, he was assigned to Company C, 1-105th Infantry in Gloversville. From December 1992 to October 1994, Shields served as facilities engineering officer at Headquarters, State Area Command in Latham. He served as real property officer at the State Area Command from October 1994 to September 1995. From September 1995 to November 1997, he was assigned as executive officer of 1st Battalion, 108th Infantry in Auburn. From November 1997 to March 1999, he was assigned as environmentalist on the State Area Command's staff. In March 1999, Shields was assigned as civil affairs officer on the staff of the 27th Enhanced Separate Infantry Brigade in Syracuse, where he served until December 1999.

== Continued career ==
Shields (left) in 2013 at presentation of wreath commemorating birthday of President Martin Van Buren

Shields served as commander of 2nd Battalion, 108th Infantry in Utica from December 1999 to June 2002. He then served as executive officer of the 27th Enhanced Separate Infantry Brigade, where he remained until April 2003. He served as deputy commander of the 27th Brigade from April 2003 to May 2006. In May 2006, Shields was assigned as commander of the 106th Regional Training Institute at Camp Smith, New York. In June 2006, he was assigned as deputy chief of staff for operations (G-3) at the National Guard's Joint Force Headquarters in Latham. From May 2007 to November 2007, he served as deputy commander of the 27th Infantry Brigade Combat Team during premobilization training at Fort Bragg, North Carolina and in Afghanistan during Operation Enduring Freedom.

From November 2007 to March 2009, Shields was assigned as the 27th Brigade's chief of staff in Afghanistan and after the organization's return to the United States. In March 2009, he was again assigned as deputy chief of staff for operations (G-3) at New York's Joint Force Headquarters. From October 2011 to July 2012, he was assigned as the new York Army National Guard's chief of staff at the Joint Force Headquarters in Latham. In July 2012, Shields was assigned as director of the New York National Guard's joint staff. In June 2016, he was assigned as New York's assistant adjutant general for army. In October 2018, he was selected to succeed Anthony P. German as the adjutant general.

== Awards ==
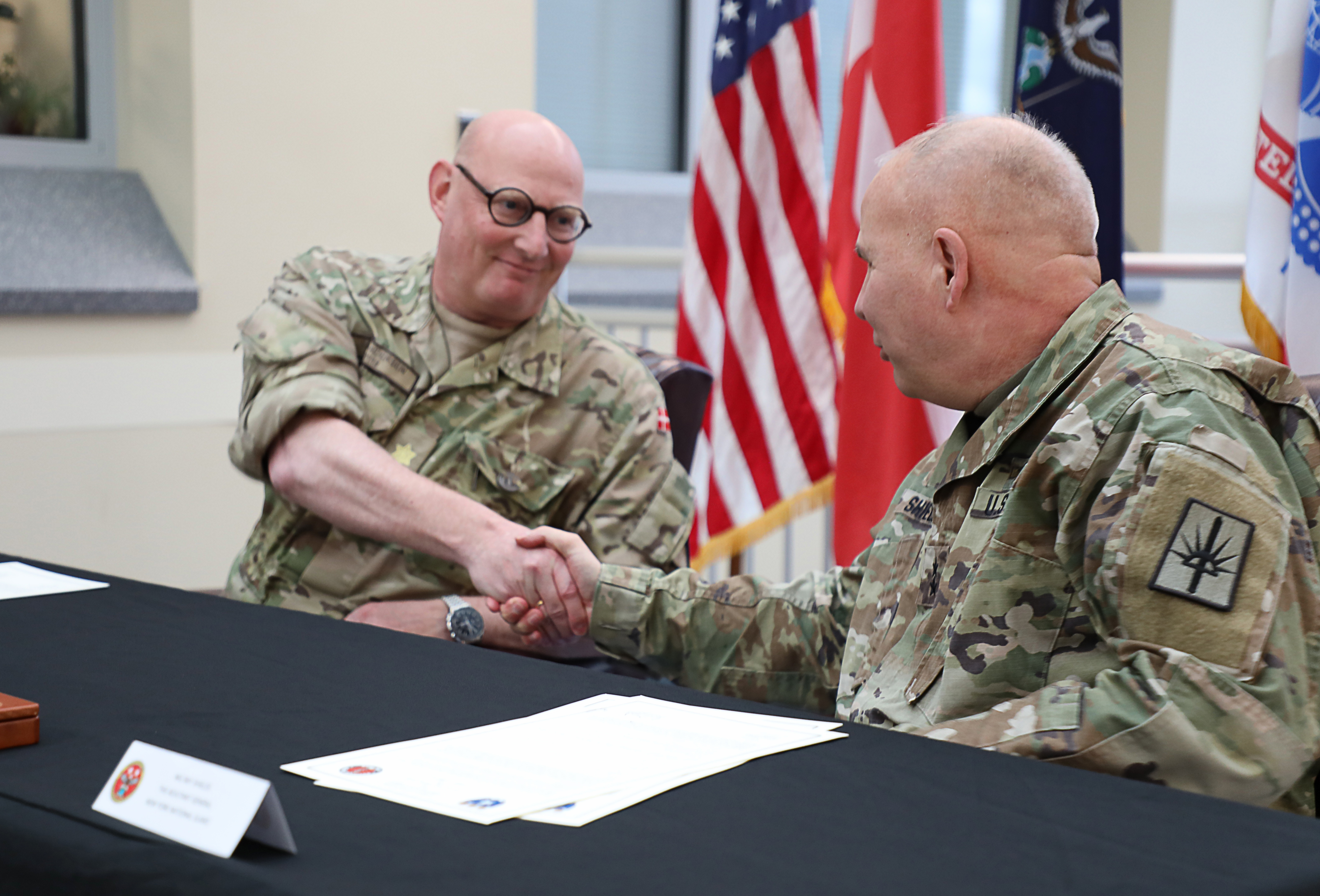
Danish Major General Søren Andersen (left) and Shields shake hands in November 2023 after agreeing to joint training exercises in Greenland

Shields's federal awards include:

- Legion of Merit
- Bronze Star Medal
- Meritorious Service Medal with 4 bronze oak leaf clusters
- Army Commendation Medal with 4 bronze oak leaf clusters
- Army Achievement Medal
- Army Reserve Components Achievement Medal with 1 silver oak leaf cluster and two bronze oak leaf clusters
- National Defense Service Medal with 1 bronze service star
- Afghanistan Campaign Medal with 1 bronze service star
- Global War on Terrorism Service Medal
- Armed Forces Reserve Medal with 1 gold hour glass, 1 bronze hourglass, and "M" device
- Army Service Ribbon
- Army Reserve Components Overseas Training Ribbon
- North Atlantic Treaty Organization Medal
- Combat Infantryman Badge
- Army Staff Identification Badge

== Effective dates of promotion ==
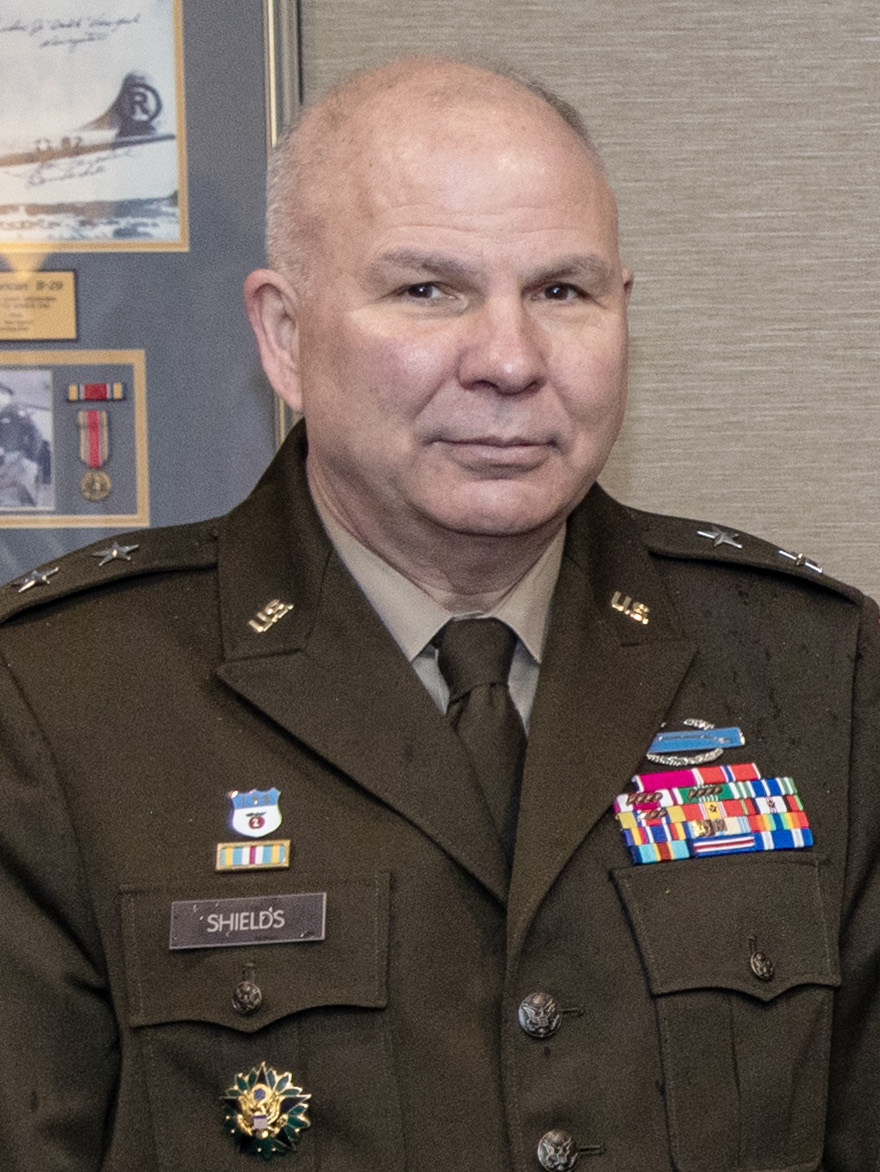
Shields in 2025

Shields's dates of rank include:

- Major General, 20 June 2017
- Brigadier General, 19 November 2012
- Colonel, 29 September 2003
- Lieutenant Colonel, 29 April 1999
- Major, 29 September 1994
- Captain, 13 May 1988
- First Lieutenant, 13 May 1986
- Second Lieutenant, 14 May 1983
- Enlisted service, 1981 to 1983
