= Beck (surname) =

Beck is a surname of either Germanic origin or Ashkenazi Jewish (B'nei kedoshim: sons of martyrs), and is fairly common in English and Slavic speaking countries, Germany (equivalent to Bach) and Denmark. The Germanic name can mean "brook, stream" (related to Old Norse bekkr) or be a variant of Becker, which is an occupational surname meaning "baker".

== Notable people ==
Notable people with this surname include:

- Aaron T. Beck (1921–2021), founder of cognitive therapy
- Adam Beck (1857–1925), Canadian politician and hydro-electricity advocate
- Adolf Beck (1841–1909), Norwegian immigrant wrongly convicted of fraud in England
- Adolf Beck (physiologist) (1863–1942), Polish professor at University of Lwow
- Alexander Beck (1899–1989), Anglo-Argentine military aviator
- Alois Beck (born 1962), Liechtenstein politician
- András Beck (1911–1985), Hungarian sculptor
- Andreas Beck (footballer) (born 1987), German football player
- Andreas Beck (tennis) (born 1986), German tennis player
- Andrew Beck (American football) (born 1996), American football player
- Andrew Beck (musician) (born 1986), American artist and musician, member of the band The Mellons
- Anna Beck (born 1979), Swedish para-cyclist
- Audrey P. Beck (1931–1983), American educator and politician
- Bill Beck (coach) (1900–1965), American college sports coach
- Brendan Beck (born 1998), American baseball player
- C. C. Beck (1910–1989), American cartoonist
- Carolyn Beck, American industrial and systems engineer
- Carrie Beck, American film and television executive
- Carson Beck (born 2002), American football player
- Charlie Beck (born 1953), Chief of the Los Angeles Police Department
- Cecilie Beck, Scandinavian musician and audiovisual artist
- Christoph Beck (born 1978), Liechtenstein politician
- Christophe Beck (born 1968/1969), Canadian composer for Buffy the Vampire Slayer
- Claude Beck (1894–1971), American cardiac surgeon who invented the defibrillator
- Clifford W. Beck (1908–1985), American politician
- Corey Beck (born 1971), American basketball player
- Dave Beck (1894–1993), American labor leader
- David Beck (painter) (1621–1656), Dutch portrait painter
- David Beck (musician), Australian drummer
- David B. Beck (PhD 2012), American physician-scientist
- David L. Beck (born 1953), Mormon leader
- Diana Beck (1900–1956), English neurosurgeon
- Doris Beck (American politician) (1929–2020), American politician
- Doris Beck (Liechtenstein politician) (born 1961), Liechtenstein businesswoman and politician
- "Dr. Beck", name taken by the Count de Werdinsky (1803–1856)
- Elisabeth Beck-Gernsheim (1946–2025), German sociologist and scholar
- Ernie Beck (1931–2024), American basketball player
- Franz Ignaz Beck (1734–1809), German classical composer
- Franz Ignaz von Beecke (1733–1803), German classical composer
- Gad Beck (1923–2012), German educator, author, activist, and survivor of the Holocaust
- Geoffrey Beck (cricketer) (1918–2019), English cricketer, minister, and centenarian
- George Beck (artist) (1749–1812), artist and poet
- Gina Beck (born 1981), English actress and singer
- Glenn Beck (born 1964), American political commentator, radio host, and television producer
- Guido Beck (1903–1988), Argentine physicist
- Günther Beck von Mannagetta und Lerchenau (1856–1931), German botanist
- Gunnar Beck (born 1966), German politician
- Hans Beck (1929–2009), German inventor
- Hans Dieter Beck (1932–2025), German publisher
- Hans Beck (historian) (born 1969) German-Canadian classics scholar
- Hans Beck (mathematician) (1876–1942) German geometer
- Hans Beck (ski jumper) (1911–1996) Norwegian competitor at 1932 Winter Olympics
- Harry Beck (1902–1974), designer of the London Underground map
- Harry Beck (footballer) (1901–1979), English footballer
- Henrik Henriksen Beck (1799–1863), Danish geologist, conchologist and naturalist
- Horatio Beck (1810–1872), American politician from Maryland
- Ivan Bek (1909–1963), Yugoslav footballer
- Ivo Beck (1926–1991), Liechtenstein politician
- Jackson Beck (1912–2004), American actor and announcer
- Jakob Sigismund Beck, German philosopher
- James Beck (1929–1973), English actor in the television series Dad's Army
- James Beck (art historian) (1930–2007), American art historian
- James B. Beck (1822–1890), American congressman from Kentucky
- James M. Beck (1861–1936), United States Solicitor General and US Congressman from Pennsylvania
- James Murray Beck (1914–2011), Canadian historian
- Jan-Philipp Beck (born 1990), German politician
- Jeff Beck (1944–2023), British electric guitarist
- Jens Michelsen Beck (1721–1791), Danish landowner and planter
- Jens Tolv Beck (1890–1939), Norwegian politician
- Joe Beck (1945–2008), American jazz guitarist
- Johann Beck (politician, born 1913) (1913–1997), Liechtenstein politician
- John Beck (actor) (born 1943), American actor
- John Beck (footballer) (born 1954), British football manager
- John Beck (gridiron football) (born 1981), NFL player and former BYU quarterback
- John Brodhead Beck (1794–1851), 19th-century United States physician
- Jonathan Mock Beck (1935–2006), American mathematician
- Joko Beck (1917–2011), an American Zen teacher
- Jordan Beck (baseball) (born 2001), American baseball player
- Józef Beck (1894–1944), Polish diplomat and military officer
- József Beck (born 1952), mathematician
- Judith S. Beck (born 1954), American psychologist
- Jürgen Beck (politician) (born 1961), Liechtenstein politician
- Justin Beck, American guitarist
- Karol Beck (born 1982), Slovak tennis player
- Ken Beck (1940–2025), Australian Rules footballer
- Kent Beck (born 1961), proponent of Extreme Programming
- Kimberly Beck (born 1956), American actress
- Kristin Beck (born 1966), retired American Navy SEAL
- Kurt Beck (born 1949), German politician (SPD)
- Laetitia Beck (born 1992), Israeli golfer
- Lewis Caleb Beck (1798–1853), American naturalist and physician
- Lina Beck-Meyenberger (1892–1988), Swiss women's activist
- Ludwig Beck (1880–1944), German general in Hitler assassination attempt
- Ludwig Beck (politician), Liechtenstein politician
- Marcel Beck (1908–1986), Swiss historian and politician
- Margit Beck (1918–1997), Hungarian-born American painter
- Mark Beck (born 1994), footballer
- Michael Beck (born 1949), American actor
- Mikkel Beck (born 1973), Danish professional football player
- Nissan Beck or Nisan Bak (1815–1889), Hasidic leader, moderniser and printer in Jerusalem
- Noah Beck (born 2001), American social medial personality
- Paul W. Beck (1876–1922), American military aviation pioneer
- Peter Beck (born 1976), CEO of Rocket Lab
- Peter Beck (German politician) (born 1967), German politician
- Peter Beck (luger) (born 1965), Liechtenstein luger
- Peter Beck (Ohio politician) (born 1952), American politician
- Peter Beck (priest) (born 1948), New Zealand Anglican priest
- Peter Beck (schoolmaster) (1909–2002), English soldier and schoolmaster
- Richard Beck (scholar) (1897–1980), American literary historian
- Rick Beck (born 1956), member of the Arkansas House of Representatives
- Robert Beck, alias of African American writer Iceberg Slim
- Robert Beck, alias of D-12 rapper Karnail Pitts
- Robert Nason Beck (1928–2008), pioneer radiologist
- Robin Beck (born 1954), American singer
- Rod Beck (1968–2007), relief pitcher in Major League Baseball
- Rollo Beck (1870–1950), American bird collector
- Solomon Scott Beck (1883–1944), American politician from Maryland
- Stanley D. Beck (1919–1997), American entomologist
- Theodore Beck, first principal of the MAO College at Aligarh, India
- Theodric Romeyn Beck (1859–1899), forensic scientist
- Ulrich Beck (1944–2015), German sociologist
- W. Raymond Beck (1932–2014), member of Maryland House of Delegates
- Wendelin Beck (1908–1978), Liechtenstein politician
- Wilhelm Beck (1885–1936), President of the Landtag of Liechtenstein
- William E. Beck (1842–1892), Chief Justice of the Colorado Supreme Court

== Fictional characters ==
- Martin Beck, Swedish police detective in the Sjöwall and Wahlöö novels
- Beck Oliver, one of the main characters from Victorious
- Florian Beck, one of the main characters from Salt to the Sea
- Guinevere Beck, character from the television series You
- Tom Beck, a character in the 1998 American science-fiction disaster movie Deep Impact
- Finley Beck, a fictional photographer appearing in the season two episode of Charmed (1998), "Chick Flick"
- Quentin Beck, one of Spiderman's enemies
- Dr. Christopher "Chris" Beck, one of the main characters from The Martian (film) and The Martian (Weir novel)
- Dr. Ivan Beck, Vice Director of the fictional private research institute Async, from the YouTube webseries Backrooms.

== See also ==
- Bak
- Beck (disambiguation)
- Verbeek
