= Nason (surname) =

Nason is an English surname. Notable people with the surname include:

- Anne Nason, American golfer
- Ben Nason (born 1989), Australian rules football player
- Charles Geoffrey Nason Stanley, Irish Anglican Dean of Lismore (1934–1960)
- David Nason (born 1970), American lawyer, president and CEO of GE Energy Financial Services
- Edward Nason West (1909–1990), Episcopal priest and fixture at the Cathedral of Saint John the Divine in New York
- Edith H. Nason (1895–1970), American food chemist and home economist
- Elias Nason (1811–1887), Massachusetts Congregational clergyman, educator, editor and author
- Emma Huntington Nason (1845–1921), American poet, author, and musical composer
- Ernest Nason Harmon (1894–1979), senior officer of the United States Army
- Frank Lewis Nason (1856–1928), American mining engineer and writer
- Geraldine Byrne Nason (born 1959), Irish diplomat, country's Permanent Representative to the UN
- Gertrude Nason (1890–1969), American painter and printmaker
- Guy Nason (born 1966), British statistician
- Henry Bradford Nason (1831–1895), American chemist
- Ithiel Nason (1839–1893), American-born businessman and political figure in British Columbia
- Jack Nason (1899–1977), American football player
- Joel F. Nason (1827–1908), American politician in Wisconsin
- John Nason (1889–1916), English cricketer
- Mike Nason (born 1981), Canadian professional ice hockey coach and former professional player
- Nicole Nason (born 1970), American lawyer, head of the National Highway Traffic Safety Administration 2006–08
- Pieter Nason (c.1612–1688/90), Dutch painter
- Riel Nason, Canadian novelist
- Robert Nason Beck (1928–2008), American scientist and a pioneer in the field of nuclear medicine
- Solomon Nason (1825–1899), American pioneer and politician
- Stephen Nason (1901–1975), Church of England priest

== See also ==
- Naso (surname)
- Nason (disambiguation)
