= David Hosack =

American physician, botanist, and educator (1769-1835)

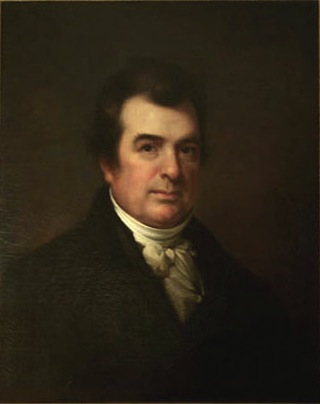
- Portrait of Hosack by Rembrandt Peale, 1826
- Born: August 31, 1769; New York City, Province of New York, British America
- Died: December 22, 1835 (aged 66); New York City, New York, U.S.
- Resting place: New York Marble Cemetery (1835–1888); Trinity Church Cemetery (reinterred 1888)
- Education: Columbia College; Princeton (A.B., 1789); Univ. of Pennsylvania (M.D., 1791); Univ. of Edinburgh
- Occupations: Physician; botanist; educator
- Spouses: Catharine Warner; Mary Eddy; Magdalena Coster
- Medical career
- Institutions: Columbia College; Columbia University College of Physicians and Surgeons

Signature
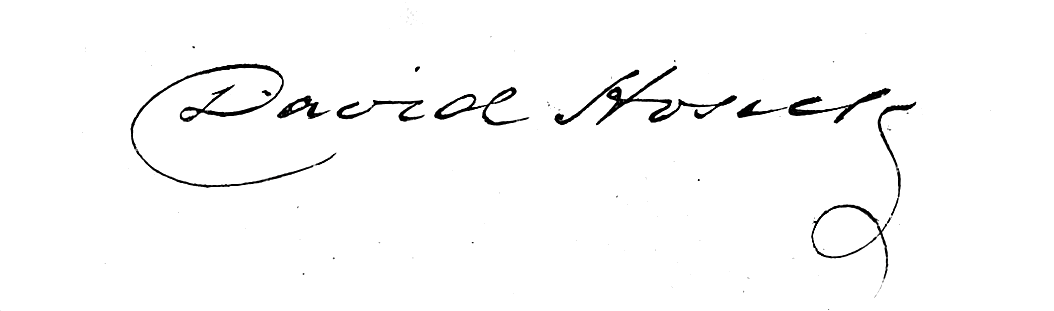

David Hosack FRS FRSE FLS (August 31, 1769 – December 22, 1835) was an American medical doctor, botanist, and educator. He remains widely known as the doctor who tended to the fatal injuries of Alexander Hamilton after his duel with Aaron Burr in July 1804, and who had similarly tended to Hamilton's son Philip after his fatal 1801 duel with George Eacker. He established several institutions including Elgin Botanic Garden and a medical school at Rutgers University.

== Early life and college ==
Hosack was born in New York City, the first of seven children of Alexander Hossack [sic], a merchant from Elgin in Scotland, and his wife Jane Arden. Following the end of the American Revolutionary War, Hosack was sent to New Jersey academies to further his education, first in Newark and then Hackensack. He would go on to attend Columbia College, now a branch of Columbia University, where he began as a student of art, but eventually became fascinated by medicine.

At Columbia, Hosack entered into a medical apprenticeship with Dr. Richard Bayley. While Hosack was studying at New York Hospital in April 1788, a violent crowd formed outside to protest body snatching, the practice of illicitly obtaining cadavers from graveyards for use in medical training. The rioters had gathered after a medical student taunted a group of children by waving a corpse's arm at them from a window, resulting in several days of violence that was later called the doctors' riot. While trying to protect the laboratory from a mob that broke into the hospital, Hosack was hit on the head with a heavy stone.

Soon afterward, Hosack left Columbia and transferred to Princeton (then known as the College of New Jersey). Hosack graduated from Princeton with a Bachelor of Arts degree in 1789.

== Medical education and early practice ==
In 1789, after graduating from Princeton, Hosack enrolled as a medical student under Dr. Nicholas Romayne, where he regularly visited homes for the poor and insane, as they were among the few places to offer clinical instruction. In the fall of 1790, Hosack transferred to medical school in Philadelphia, where he wrote a doctoral dissertation on cholera. He married in early 1791, and that spring he received his medical degree from the University of Pennsylvania.

In 1791, Hosack and his wife Catharine moved to Alexandria, Virginia, where he opened his first medical practice. They returned a year later to New York City.

During Hosack's first few years in medical practice, he concluded that the best practitioners had received at least some of their schooling in Europe, and convinced his father to pay his way to Britain in order to obtain such schooling. Upon arriving in the United Kingdom, Hosack matriculated at the University of Edinburgh, where he was reportedly horrified to find his knowledge of botany was sorely lacking. Well received by some of the leading scientific minds of the period, Hosack spent much of his time in their botanical gardens and lecture halls. He ultimately became one of the leading American scholars of botany.

Hosack returned to America by 1796 and established a practice in New York City. A good deal of Hosack's clinical work was as a family practitioner, including pediatric and obstetric care.

In the years that followed, Hosack gained a reputation as a confirmed family man, and for living well.

== Hamilton–Burr duel ==
Hosack was the family doctor of Alexander Hamilton and his family, and is perhaps best known as the doctor present during Hamilton's duel with Aaron Burr in Weehawken, New Jersey on July 11, 1804. Hosack, a friend to both Hamilton and Burr, treated Hamilton after Burr fired. He removed Hamilton's upper clothing to inspect the wound and pulse before accompanied him across the river to the dockside home of William Bayard Jr., where Hamilton died the next day. Hosack had also treated Hamilton's son Philip after he was fatally shot by George Eacker in a duel at the same location in 1801. At Alexander Hamilton's funeral, Hosack was one of the pallbearers.

Three years after the duel, Burr was tried and acquitted on a charge of treason for a conspiracy to form a new nation in the Louisiana Territory and Spanish Texas. Hosack loaned Burr money for passage on a ship to Europe, where Burr lived for several years in self-imposed exile to escape his creditors and the notoriety resulting from the trial.

== Contributions to medicine and science ==
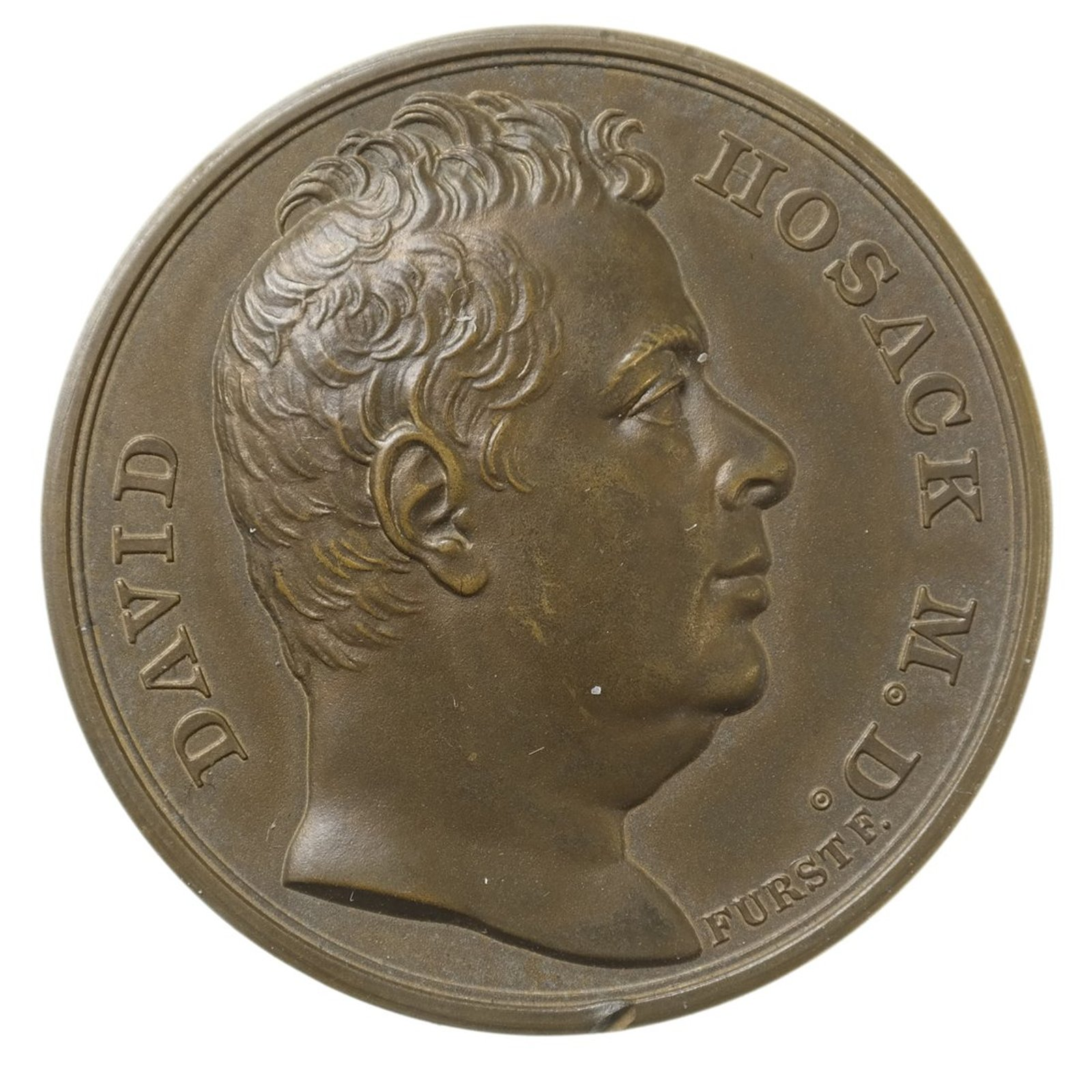
Medal depicting Hosack, issued c. 1820 by the U.S. Mint

Hosack was the creator in 1801 of America's first botanical garden, the Elgin Botanic Garden, which he modeled after gardens he had seen in Scotland and named for the garden in his father’s birthplace.

=== Teaching career ===
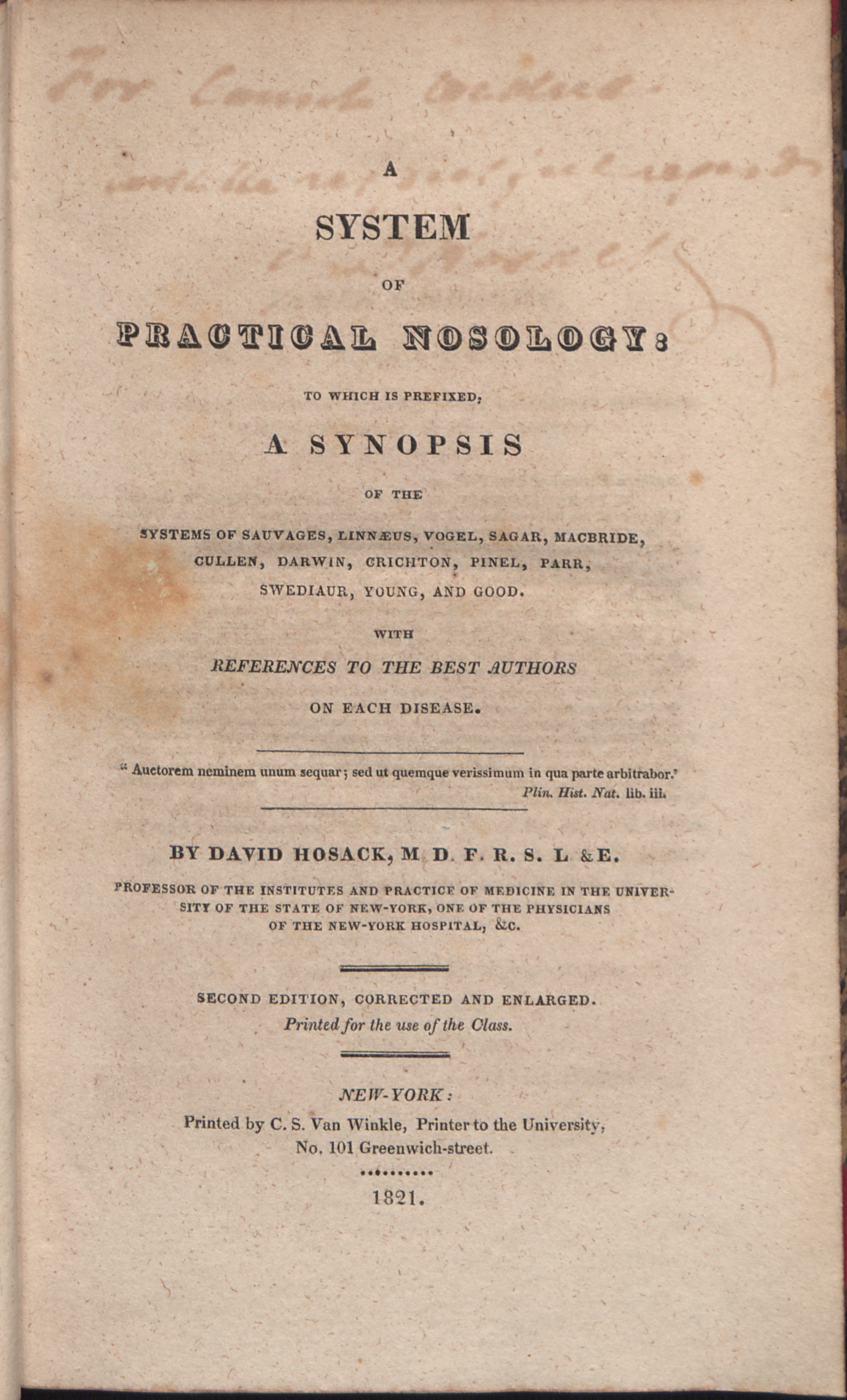
System of practical nosology, 1821

One of Hosack's most distinguished students was a celebrated New York City physician, John Franklin Gray, who later became the first practitioner of homeopathy in the United States. Gray's embrace of homeopathy, a pseudoscientific discipline, resulted in the loss of Hosack's friendship.

=== Establishment of hospitals and schools ===
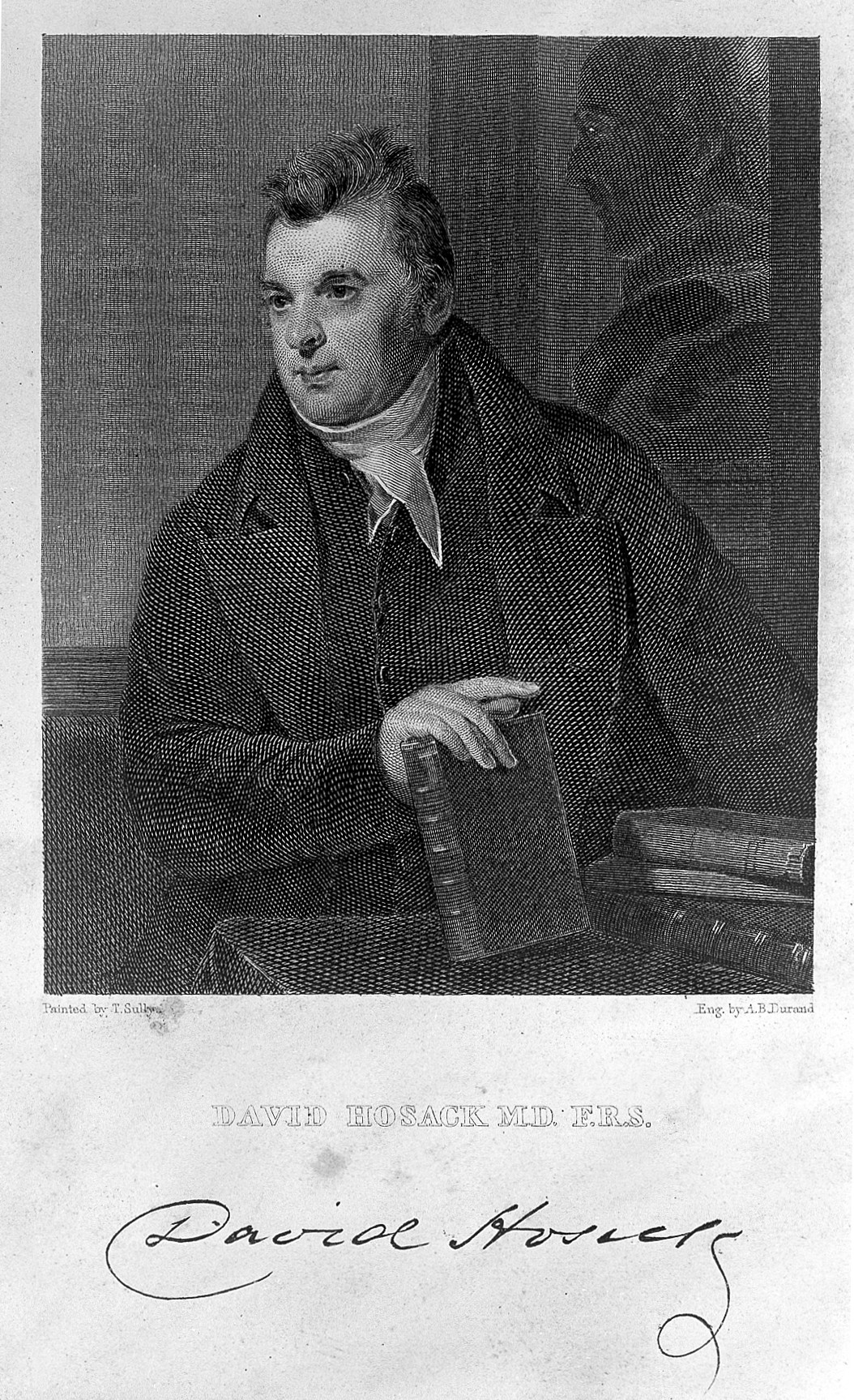
David Hosack in an 1835 engraving of a painting by Thomas Sully

==== Lying-In Hospital of New York ====
In 1798, following a yellow fever epidemic, Hosack proposed opening the first lying-in hospital in New York, a maternity clinic where he could offer health care to poor pregnant women. He raised funds from subscribers, including Alexander Hamilton, to purchase a house on Cedar Street where the Lying-In Hospital opened in 1799. In 1801, the Lying-In Hospital moved into space rented from New York Hospital, but ceased operations in 1827 when New York Hospital refused to host the facility any longer. The institution continued to exist on paper as a charitable society for several decades after Hosack's death, ultimately merging in 1890 with an obstetrical dispensary that became part of New York Hospital, now NewYork–Presbyterian Hospital.

==== Medical colleges ====
Hosack and his former teacher, Dr. Nicholas Romayne, both at various times sought academic sponsorship from colleges in order to found new medical schools at those colleges. They were early proponents of the belief that medical education should be easily accessible. One of Hosack's earlier victories was the merger of the College of Physicians and Surgeons and Columbia University. He successfully pursued an alliance with Rutgers College, bringing his group of colleagues to New Brunswick, New Jersey. Medical instruction at Rutgers began on November 6, 1826; however, as quickly as the medical college came into existence, opposition surfaced from the medical establishment in New York.

Hosack came under attack by the County Medical Society of New York for "unjustifiable interference in the medical concerns of the state and disregard for the provisions of the laws of the state regarding medical education."

After the defeat, Hosack traveled to upstate New York and succeeded in gaining the sponsorship of Geneva College in Geneva, New York. Soon after, the medical school previously established in New Jersey at Rutgers transferred its allegiance to Geneva. The trustees of that college voted on October 30, 1827, to establish the medical faculty. Hosack's adversaries filed suit in The People v. The Trustees of Geneva College, in which the court ruled that the college did not have the power to operate or appoint a faculty at any place but Geneva, invalidating the branch of Geneva College in New York City.

=== Horticulture and botany ===
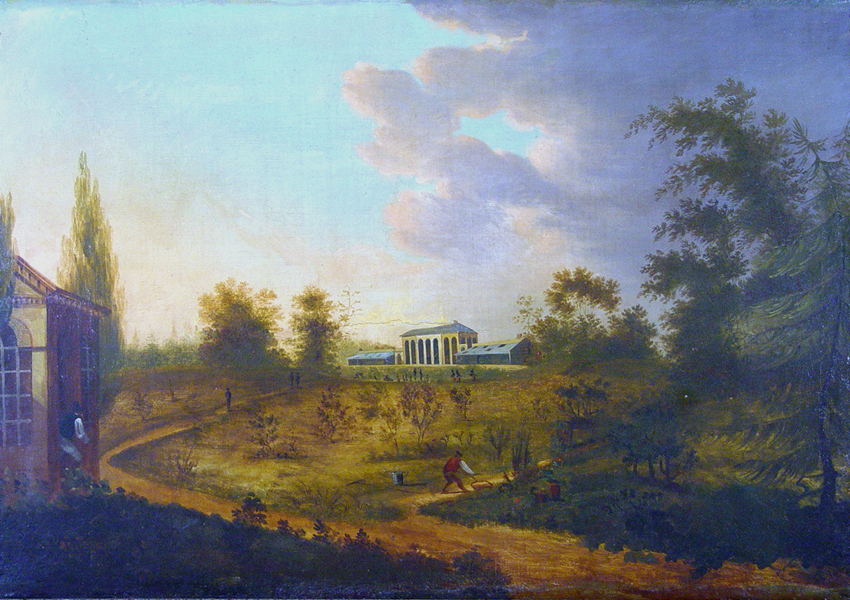
1810 painting of the Elgin Botanic Garden

In 1801, Hosack created the Elgin Botanic Garden, named for his father's Scottish birthplace. It was the first public botanical garden in the United States, established with his purchase of twenty acres of rural land on the outskirts of New York City for just under $5,000, equivalent to $118,000 in 2025 dollars. The location, 3½ miles from what was then the city limit, is now bounded by 47th Street on the south, 51st Street on the north, and Fifth Avenue on the east, reaching nearly to Sixth Avenue on the west. It is the present site of Rockefeller Center.

The entire property "was intended by Professor Hosack for a botanical garden, the prime object of which was to be the collection and cultivation of native plants of this country, especially such as possess medicinal properties or are otherwise useful." At his own expense, Hosack landscaped the garden with a variety of indigenous and exotic plants, mostly of American origin. By 1805, after Hosack had spent $75,000 on the effort, the garden was home to 1,500 species of plants from all over the world, including some rare specimens contributed by Thomas Jefferson. The following year, Hosack published a catalogue and visitors' guide, containing an extensive list of the plants under cultivation at Elgin.

Hosack's funds were insufficient to support such a project indefinitely, and it was suggested that he was so preoccupied with his endeavors in the creation of Rutgers Medical College that he had neither time nor money to continue the garden. The State of New York purchased Elgin from Hosack, pursuant to an 1810 act of the New York State Legislature, for a much lower sum than Hosack had paid for the property.

Care of the garden was placed in the hands of the Board of Regents of the University of the State of New York, which then gave it to Columbia College in 1814. Columbia had no interest in continuing with the costly project. Elgin Botanic Garden was abandoned and eventually fell into decay, and Columbia ultimately leased the land to John D. Rockefeller Jr. in the 1920s for the construction of Rockefeller Center.

== Personal life ==
=== Marriages and children ===
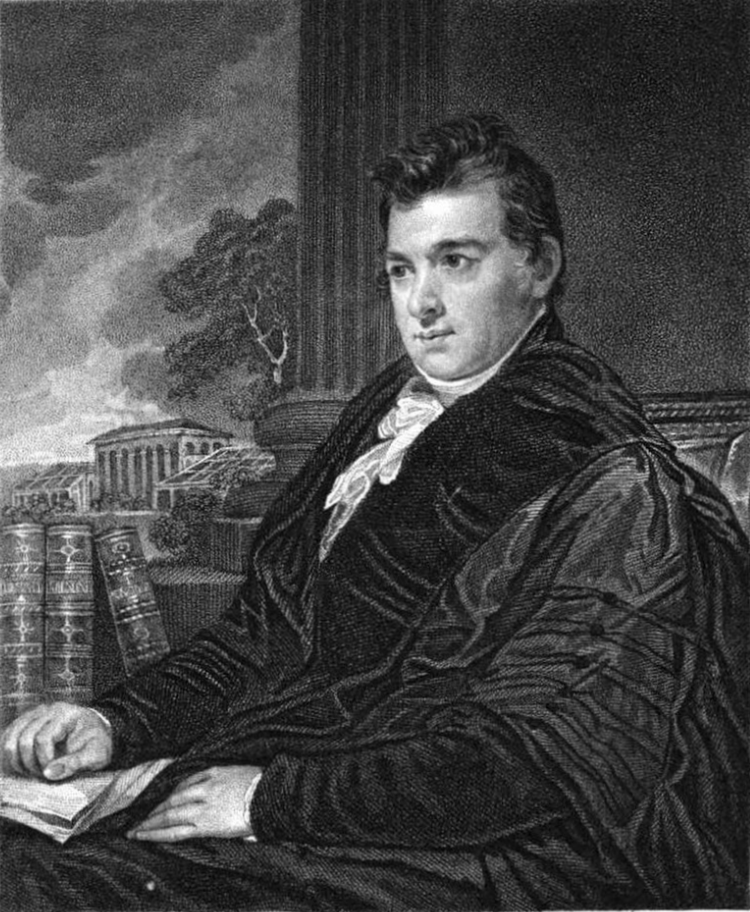
Engraving of a portrait of Hosack by Thomas Sully

Early in 1791, shortly before receiving his medical degree, Hosack married Catharine Warner, whom he had met while studying at Princeton. Their son Alexander was born in Virginia in June 1792, after which the family moved back to New York City. Shortly after Hosack returned from Scotland to America, his son died. Catharine died soon after, in 1796, giving birth to a second child who also died. These personal tragedies, along with epidemics of yellow fever that hit Philadelphia in 1793 and New York in 1795 and 1798, led Hosack to devote much of his life thereafter towards the expansion of medical knowledge and education, as well as the training of doctors in caring for women and children. Hosack became an advocate for the betterment of lives of the poor, which led him to become a founder of the Humane Society.

Close to two years after his first wife died, Hosack married a Philadelphia woman, Mary Eddy, a sister of Thomas Eddy, a prominent Philadelphia philanthropist and prison reformer. David and Mary Hosack had nine children, seven of whom survived to adulthood. These included Alexander Eddy Hosack (1805–1871), a pioneering surgeon who took on much of his father's practice after his death.

=== Social and intellectual pursuits ===
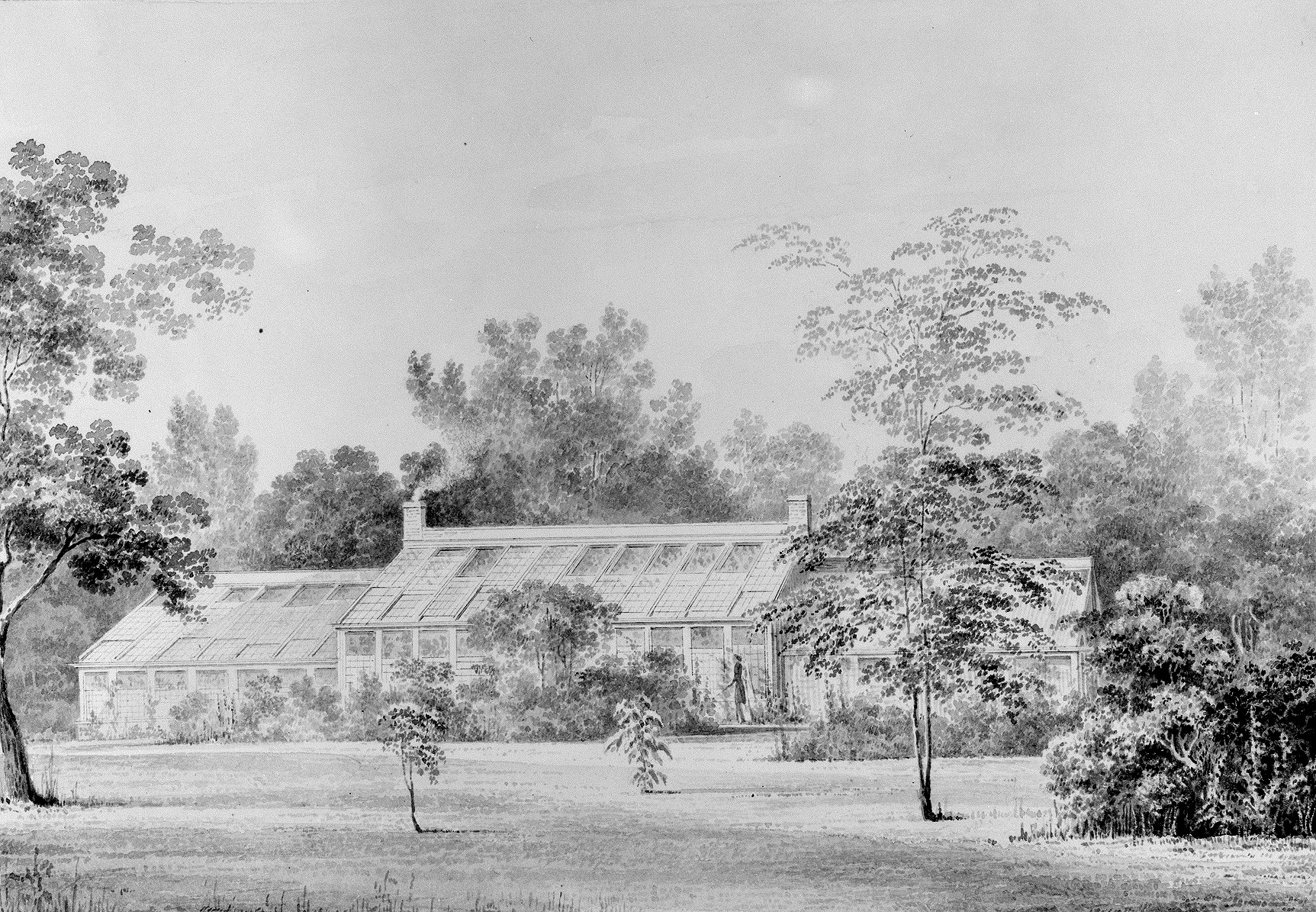
Greenhouse on Hosack's estate in Hyde Park

Hosack was one of the founders of the New-York Historical Society, and its fourth president (1820–1827). He was also a president of the Literary and Philosophical Society of New York. He was elected a member of the American Philosophical Society in 1810, the American Antiquarian Society in 1814, and a Fellow of the American Academy of Arts and Sciences the following year. In 1821, he was elected a foreign member of the Royal Swedish Academy of Sciences, and in 1827 he was elected into the National Academy of Design as an Honorary Academician.

=== Final days ===
The Great Fire of New York, which began on December 15, 1835, destroyed between 530 and 700 buildings in New York City, covering 13 acres (53,000 m^{2}) in 17 city blocks. Hosack's personal loss of property in the fire was valued at $300,000, equivalent to $9,900,000 in 2025 dollars.

Hosack died of a stroke one week afterward, on December 22, 1835, and was buried at New York Marble Cemetery. In 1888, Hosack's descendants had him reinterred at Trinity Church Cemetery, where Alexander Hamilton is also buried.

== In popular culture ==
- Gillen D'Arcy Wood's 2005 historical novel, Hosack's Folly, was based on the life of Dr. Hosack. Hosack's Folly takes place twenty years after the Hamilton–Burr duel, during a time of great danger in New York due to a yellow fever epidemic.
- In the 2015 Broadway musical Hamilton, an ensemble member carrying a medical bag represents Hosack (not identified by name) at the duel in which Alexander Hamilton is killed. Aaron Burr, in the song "The World Was Wide Enough", sings that Hamilton brought "a doctor that he knew," adding that "the doctor turned around so he could have deniability."

== Selected works ==
- An introductory lecture on medical education (1801)
- Observations on the Canada thistle (1810)
- Observations on the establishment of the College of Physicians and Surgeons in the city of New-York (1811)
- Observations on the surgery of the ancients: vindicating their claims to many of the reputed discoveries and improvements of modern times (1813)
- Observations on the advantages of exposing wounds to the air after capital operations (1813)
- Observations on vision (1813)
- Observations on the laws governing the communication of contagious diseases: and the means of arresting their progress (1815)
- Tribute to the memory of the late Caspar Wistar (1818)
- System of practical nosology (1821)
