= De Beck =

De Beck or DeBeck is a surname. Notable people with this surname include:

- Billy DeBeck (1890–1942), American cartoonist
- Erik De Beck (born 1951), Belgian long-distance runner
- Jean de Beck (1588–1648), soldier and governor of the Duchy of Luxembourg and of the County of Chiny

== See also ==
- Beck (surname)
