= Senator Beck =

Senator Beck may refer to:

- Audrey P. Beck (1931–1983), Connecticut State Senate
- Clifford W. Beck (1907–1985), Washington State Senate
- Doug Beck (born 1964/65), Missouri State Senate
- George T. Beck (1856–1943), Wyoming State Senate
- James B. Beck (1822–1890), U.S. Senator from Kentucky from 1877 to 1890
- Jennifer Beck (born 1967), New Jersey State Senate
- John E. Beck (1869–1952), Massachusetts State Senate
- Sharon Beck (1937–2013), Nebraska State Senate
- Solomon Scott Beck (1883–1944), Maryland State Senate
