= Naso =

Naso or NASO may refer to:

== Astronomical Societies ==
- Nepal Astronomical Society (NASO)

== Biology ==
- Naso (fish), a genus of fishes
- Catasetum naso, a species of orchid
- Kurixalus naso, a species of frog
- Parnara naso, a species of skipper butterfly

== Other ==
- Naso (surname)
- Naso people, also known as Teribe or Tjër Di, indigenous to Panama
- Naso, the endonym for the Teribe language
- Naso, Sicily, a town in the province of Messina, Sicily
- Naso (parashah), in the annual Jewish cycle of Torah reading
- Publius Ovidius Naso, a Roman poet.

== NASO ==
- NASO, a U.S. Naval Aviation Supply Officer, a warfare qualification device in the Navy Supply Corps
- National Adult School Organisation (NASO) in the United Kingdom

== See also ==
- Nasal (disambiguation)
- National socialism
