= Actoria gens =

Ancient Roman family

The gens Actoria was an obscure Roman family of the late Republic or early Empire. The only member of this gens mentioned in history is Marcus Actorius Naso, whom Suetonius quotes as an authority on the life or times of Caesar. Other Actorii are known from inscriptions.

== Members ==
- Marcus Actorius Naso, quoted by Suetonius in his "Life of Caesar". The historian does not state the period at which Naso lived, but the manner in which he is described suggests that he might have been Caesar's contemporary.
- Lucius Actorius L. l. Sphaerus, a freedman buried at Narbo in Gallia Narbonensis during the Augustan Age. He was a sagarius, or dealer in mantles.

== See also ==
- List of Roman gentes

== Bibliography ==
- Gaius Suetonius Tranquillus, De Vita Caesarum (Lives of the Caesars, or The Twelve Caesars).
- Dictionary of Greek and Roman Biography and Mythology, William Smith, ed., Little, Brown and Company, Boston (1849).
- Theodor Mommsen et alii, Corpus Inscriptionum Latinarum (The Body of Latin Inscriptions, abbreviated CIL), Berlin-Brandenburgische Akademie der Wissenschaften (1853–present).
