= Naso (surname) =

Naso is a Sicilian surname. Notable people with the surname include:

- Bob Naso (born 1937), American college football coach
- Gianluca Naso (born 1987), Italian tennis player
- Joseph Naso (born 1934), American serial killer
- Lucius Antonius Naso, Roman tribune from the 1st century AD
- Marcus Actorius Naso, Roman writer from the 1st century BC
- Ovid (43 BC – AD 17), also known as Publius Ovidius Naso

== See also ==
- Naso (disambiguation)
- Nason (surname)
