= Nicholas F. Beck =

American attorney and militia officer (1795–1830)

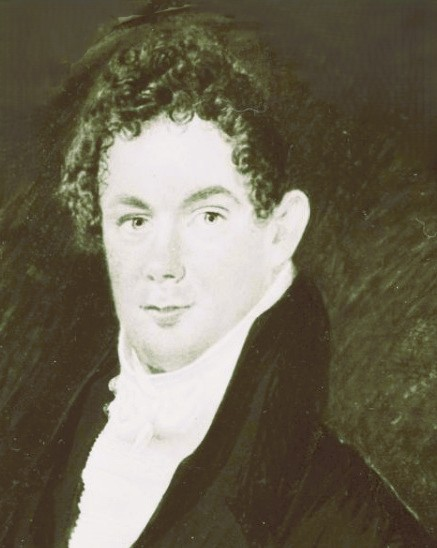
- Beck c. 1825
- Born: 2 November 1796; Schenectady, New York, US
- Died: 30 June 1830 (aged 33); Albany, New York, US
- Burial place: Vale Cemetery, Schenectady, New York, US
- Education: Union College
- Spouse: Anna Maria Walton (m. 1827–1830)
- Children: 2
- Relatives: Theodric Romeyn Beck (brother); John Brodhead Beck (brother); Lewis Caleb Beck (brother); Nicolas Dubois Dominic Beck (grandson)
- Military career
- Service: New York Militia
- Service years: 1818–1830
- Rank: Brigadier General
- Unit: 14th Brigade
- Commands: Adjutant General of New York
- Other work: Attorney

Nicholas F. Beck (2 November 1796 – 30 June 1830) was an American attorney and military officer from New York. A native of Schenectady and an 1813 graduate of Union College, he practiced law in Schenectady and served as city clerk. A Democratic-Republican, he was a supporter of Governor DeWitt Clinton and was active in the militia. In 1818, Clinton appointed him judge advocate of the militia's 14th Brigade with the rank of colonel. In 1825, Clinton appointed Beck Adjutant General of New York with the rank of brigadier general, a position in which he served until his death.

== Biography ==
Nicholas Fairly Beck (Note: Beck's middle name sometimes appears in records as "Fairley".) was born in Schenectady, New York on 2 November 1796, a son of Caleb Beck and Catherine Theresa (Romeyn) Beck. Among his siblings were Theodric Romeyn Beck, John Brodhead Beck, and Lewis Caleb Beck. Beck was raised and educated in Schenectady, then attended Union College, from which he graduated in 1813. In 1816, Union College upgraded Beck's degree to Master of Arts. After college, he studied law, attained admission to the bar in 1817, and practiced in Schenectady. Active in politics as a Democratic-Republican, he served as Schenectady's city clerk from 1819 to 1826. He also became active in the New York Militia, and in 1818 Governor DeWitt Clinton appointed him judge advocate of the 14th Brigade (Schenectady County) with the rank of colonel.

In 1825, Charles G. Haines died while serving as Adjutant General of New York. Clinton, returned to the governorship after two years out of office, appointed Beck to succeed Haines, and Beck received promotion to brigadier general. After his promotion, Beck moved to Albany, the state capital. He continued to support Clinton politically, and was the author of an 1827 pamphlet advocating a Clinton infrastructure project Considerations In Favor of the Construction of a Great State Road from Lake Erie to the Hudson River. In 1827, Beck married Anna Maria Walton; they were the parents of two sons, Reverend John Walton Romeyn Beck (1828–1889) and Charles Thatcher Beck (1830–1831). John W. R. Beck was the father of Nicolas Dubois Dominic Beck, a Canadian prosecutor, judge and college administrator.

In 1828, Beck was appointed to the board of trustees of the Rensselaer Polytechnic Institute, and he served until his death. He was still serving as adjutant general when he died in Albany on 30 June 1830. He was succeeded by his law partner, Matthew H. Webster. Beck was originally buried at Schenectady's Old Cemetery Between Front and Green Streets. In 1879, most burials at that location, including Beck's, were moved to Vale Cemetery. After Beck's death, his wife married George Strange Boulton.
