= Charles G. Haines =

American attorney and militia officer (1792–1825)

- Born: 24 January 1792; Canterbury, New Hampshire, US
- Died: 3 July 1825 (aged 33); Manhattan, New York, US
- Burial place: St. Mark's Church in-the-Bowery, Manhattan, New York, US
- Education: Middlebury College
- Military career
- Service: Vermont Militia; New York Militia
- Service years: 1817–1825
- Rank: Brigadier General
- Units: 1st Brigade, 3rd Division, Vermont Militia; 2nd Division, New York Militia
- Commands: Adjutant General of New York
- Other work: Attorney

Charles G. Haines (24 January 1792 – 3 July 1825) was an American attorney and militia officer. A native of New Hampshire, he graduated from Middlebury College in 1816 and became an attorney in New York City. He joined the state militia as a colonel in 1819 and attained the rank of brigadier general when he was appointed Adjutant General of New York in 1825.

== Early life ==
Charles Glidden Haines was born in Canterbury, New Hampshire, on 24 January 1792, a son of Samuel Haines and Hannah (Johnson) Haines. He was raised and educated in Canterbury, then lived and worked in Concord, New Hampshire, where he developed a reputation as an effective debater and orator on behalf of the Democratic-Republican Party. He then attended Middlebury College, from which he graduated in 1816. After graduation, he studied law and became an essayist and pamphleteer on politics and government, in addition to editing Middlebury's National Standard newspaper. In 1817, he was appointed Vermont's deputy secretary of state and aide-de-camp to Brigadier General Hastings Warren, commander of the militia's 1st Brigade, 3rd Division.

In 1818, Haines moved to New York City and became Governor DeWitt Clinton's private secretary. He also published essays and pamphlets in support of Clinton's policies and among his most popular works were writings in favor of constructing the Erie Canal and abolishing the state council of appointment. In 1821, he was admitted to the bar, after which he practiced in partnership with Richard I. Wells. In 1824, he argued the case of Ogden v. Saunders before the United States Supreme Court as co-counsel of Henry Clay. Saunders, represented by Clay, Haines, and others sued Ogden, represented by Daniel Webster and others, on the grounds that Odgen had not made payment on a contract. Odgen's countersuit claimed he did not owe the debt because he had declared bankruptcy under an 1801 New York statute. Ogden won the case after re-argument in 1827, when the Supreme Court decided that state bankruptcy laws did not violate the Obligation of Contracts Clause of the United States Constitution. Haines was highly esteemed for his literary and legal acumen; Webster called him the most brilliant man in the United States.

== Continued career ==
Haines was involved in several business ventures and civic causes after his move to New York. In 1818, he was appointed corresponding secretary of the New-York Corresponding Association for the Promotion of Internal Improvements, a pro-Erie Canal society formed by Clinton. In 1819, he was appointed to the board of managers of the New-York Agricultural Society. In 1820, he was appointed to the board of managers of the New York Society for the Prevention of Pauperism. In addition to his legal, writing, and business careers, Haines maintained his military membership; in 1819, Clinton appointed him judge advocate of the New York Militia's 2nd Division with the rank of colonel. In 1820, Haines was an incorporator of the New-Jersey Salt Marsh Company, a venture formed to drain and develop wetlands near Hoboken and Newark, and he was appointed to the corporation's board of directors. Also in 1820, Haines was appointed to the board of directors of the New-York Institution for the Instruction of the Deaf and Dumb.

In 1822, he was one of the organizers of a planned new legal publication, the Law Magazine, later called the United States Law Journal. Also in 1822, Haines was one of three commissioners appointed by the state of New York to supervise the initial stock issue for the newly-chartered Hoboken Banking and Grazing Company. Haines was a Freemason and in 1823 was elected grand secretary of New York state's grand lodge. In January 1824, he was appointed one of the assistant counselors of the New England Society. In May 1824, he formed a new law firm, this time in partnership with Andrew S. Garr. In June 1824, Haines was appointed attorney for the Fulton Bank and counselor for the Sun Fire Insurance Company. In September 1824, he was elected to represent Staten Island as a state Democratic-Republican convention delegate. In November 1824, he was an unsuccessful candidate for the United States House of Representatives as the nominee of Democratic-Republicans who opposed as undemocratic the party's legislative convention system of nominating presidential candidates. With the United States Senate term of Federalist Rufus King set to expire in March 1825, and Democratic-Republicans the majority in the New York State Legislature, Haines was among the prominent party members suggested as candidates.

In January 1825, Clinton returned to the governorship after a two year absence, and he appointed Haines as Adjutant General of New York with the rank of brigadier general. In the spring of 1825, Haines became ill with tuberculosis. He died at his doctor's home in the Bloomingdale neighborhood of Manhattan on 3 July 1825. His funeral included military honors, and among the mourners were Philip Van Cortlandt and the Marquis de Lafayette. Haines was buried at St. Mark's Church in-the-Bowery. At the time of his death, Haines was engaged to Charlotte Stark of Dunbarton, New Hampshire. She never married, and was 89 when she died in Dunbarton in 1889. Haines was succeeded as adjutant general by Nicholas F. Beck.

== Works by ==
(Partial list)

- Considerations On The Great Western Canal. Brooklyn, New York: Spooner & Worthington. 1818 – via Google Books.
- Report on the Penitentiary System in the United States. New York, New York: Mahlon Day. 1822 – via Google Books.
- A Letter to the Hon. Micah Sterling: Member of Congress from the States of New-York, on the Expediency of Adopting a Uniform System of Bankruptcy in the United States. New York, New York: E. Conrad. 1822 – via Google Books.
- Two Speeches Delivered in the New York State Convention, September, 1824. New York, New York: G. F. Hopkins. 1824 – via Google Books.
- Memoir of Thomas Addis Emmet. New York, New York: G. & C. & H. Carvill. 1829 – via Google Books.
