= Hosack's Folly =

2005 historical novel

Hosack's Folly is a 2005 historical novel written by Australian author Gillen D'Arcy Wood. Based on the life of renowned New York physician Dr. David Hosack, the story takes place in 1820s Manhattan during an impending yellow fever epidemic.

== Synopsis ==
The story begins with a recounting of the legendary duel between Alexander Hamilton and Aaron Burr at Weehawken, New Jersey in 1804. The prologue tells of how Hamilton brought among his crew a young doctor, David Hosack, who tended to Hamilton following his fatal wounding at the hands of Burr.

Jumping forward 20 years into the future, Dr. Hosack and apprentice Albert Dash realize a yellow fever outbreak is upon them after treating a man who is killed by the disease. Hosack sends his apprentice to discover all he can about where their patient may have contracted the disease, and eventually comes upon the conclusion that it was brought in the hull of a ship, the Belladonna, from Kingston, Jamaica. Hosack and Dash at once begin a campaign for a quarantine of the Manhattan docks, as this is the only way to prevent an epidemic.

Concurrently, a powerful coalition including Manhattan Mayor Van Ness, newspaper editor Eamonn Casey, and socialite John Laidlaw concoct a plan that includes Casey's candidacy for governor of New York, in order to put in place a plan for the construction of an aqueduct that would provide water to all of Manhattan. Upon hearing Hosack's call for a quarantine on the docks, Casey begins a smear campaign in his paper to discredit Hosack, because a quarantine on the docks would make an aqueduct impossible.

During this time, Albert Dash is instructing Casey's daughter, Virginia, in the study of botany. Virginia is learning much from Dash, and has developed a strong passion for her tutor. Telling him is impossible however, as Albert is engaged to her best friend Vera, the daughter of John Laidlaw and aspiring stage actress. The clashes among Dash and Vera's socialite lifestyle create tensions among him and the upper class of Manhattan, who do not believe he is a good fit for Vera.

The smear campaign on Dr. Hosack proves successful, and his call for quarantine is overruled at a hearing. Sensing victory in their grasp, the group behind the aqueduct plan begins pitching their idea, which seems very promising because of the lack of clean, drinkable water in the city.

When yellow fever breaks out in Philadelphia, a panic rises up among Manhattan citizens, but it is slowly pushed to the back of their minds through reassurances by Laidlaw, the Mayor, and Casey, along with the arrival of prominent English stage actor Edmund Leadbetter, who is set to perform at the rival theater from Vera Laidlaw, set to make her stage debut as Ophelia in Hamlet. When Leadbetter offends all of Manhattan by bashing American lifestyle, the yellow fever in Philadelphia becomes a non-issue.

Leadbetter issues an apology and plans to still perform, but his appearance in theater creates a riot. Vera, Virginia, Albert, and others who are in attendance are lost in the giant, fighting crowd. When Albert comes into danger from the crowd, Virginia rushes forward and protects him, causing both to be injured.

Casey's candidacy has so far taken some damage because of the scare in Philadelphia and his rant against Hosack, but he and Laidlaw continue to believe he can still gain the vote. This comes to an end when Hosack directs a stagecoach to city hall containing the body of a man already dead from yellow fever. Laidlaw and Casey flee to Ambleside and the home of Samuel Geyer while Manhattan becomes a scene of panic, as yellow fever infection becomes widespread. Dash and Hosack begin taking in a steady flow of patients in their hospital and treat those they believe they can save. At night Hosack calls Dash into his office, where Dash is overcome with the sickness.

Vera and Virginia escape from Ambleside and arrive at the hospital, as it is well known Hosack is short of help in fighting the fever. On their way they discuss their deepest wishes, and it comes to light that Vera is now in love with Edmund Leadbetter and he has invited her to join him in England as his stage partner. Virginia confesses her love for Albert as well, and is relieved to hear Vera is not upset with her.

Upon arriving at the hospital, Virginia is taken to care for Albert, while Vera is taken by a nurse to attend to the mass of patients needing care. Virginia confesses her love to Albert as he lies on his sickbed, even though in his delusional state he cannot hear her. Virginia eventually leaves Albert and falls asleep, and when she is awoken Dr. Hosack informs her that Albert has gotten up and is recovering, and wishes to see her.

The Epilogue informs us that Vera indeed has left for England, along with her entire family, as her father wished to avoid disgrace for his actions. Eamonn Casey has decided to quit publishing his newspaper, and to withdraw from the race for governor. Virginia and Albert are living together at Dr. Hosack's villa while Albert continues to recover. Albert is offered a professorship at Columbia in botany, but declines when Dr. Hosack issues the invitation, saying he and Virginia plan to travel west, where he may open his own hospital and she may run it.

== Characters ==
- Albert Dash – a student of Dr. Hosack's at Columbia who assists in his research and in fighting yellow fever
- Eamonn Casey – a powerful newspaper editor in Manhattan, and candidate for Governor of New York
- John Laidlaw – rich Manhattanite who first conceives aqueduct idea
- Virginia Casey – a daughter of Eamonn Casey and friend of Vera Laidlaw, she is taking botany lessons from Albert Dash
- Vera Laidlaw – a daughter of John Laidlaw and friend of Virginia Casey, she is an aspiring actress and fiancée of Albert Dash
- Dr. David Hosack – Professor of Botany at Columbia, instrumental in fighting a previous yellow fever epidemic in 1814 and the major voice behind a quarantine.
- George Bickart – a friend of Albert Dash's from Columbia, on the payroll of John Laidlaw
- Mayor Van Ness – a mayor of Manhattan, member of group behind aqueduct plan
- Sam Geyer – a member of group planning aqueduct, friend of Eamonn Casey and John Laidlaw
