= William W. Beck =

American politician (1870–1923)

Member of the Maryland Senate from the Kent County district
- In office 1912–1916
- Preceded by: William M. Slay
- Succeeded by: Henry Brown

Personal details
- Born: William Walker Beck; February 15, 1870 Chestertown, Maryland, U.S.
- Died: April 5, 1923 (aged 53) Baltimore, Maryland, U.S.
- Resting place: Chestertown Cemetery
- Party: Democratic
- Spouse: Mary Page
- Children: 2
- Relatives: Horatio Beck (grandfather)
- Education: Washington College; United States Naval Academy; University of Maryland School of Law
- Occupation: Politician; lawyer

William Walker Beck (February 15, 1870 – April 5, 1923) was an American politician from Maryland. He served as a member of the Maryland Senate, representing Kent County from 1912 to 1916. He later served as chairman of the Maryland tax commission.

== Early life ==
William Walker Beck was born on February 15, 1870, in Chestertown, Maryland, to Samuel Beck. His father was a clerk of the circuit court. His grandfather was Horatio Beck. He attended public schools and graduated from Washington College. He was recommended for the United States Naval Academy by U.S. Representative Charles H. Gibson and Beck graduated from the academy in 1891. He graduated from the University of Maryland School of Law in 1893.

== Career ==
Beck started a law practice in Chestertown. From 1903 to 1912, he served two terms as state's attorney of Kent County. He was a Democrat. He served as a member of the Maryland Senate, representing Kent County from 1912 to 1916.

In 1918, he was appointed to succeed Lewin W. Wickes on the Maryland tax commission. In 1919, after the death of Arthur Pue Gorman Jr., he became chairman of the commission. He was president of the Chestertown Bank of Maryland and was a member of the board of visitors and governors of Washington College.

== Personal life ==
Beck married Mary Page and had two daughters, Ellen Constable and Merritt "Mary" Page. He was a vestryman of Emmanuel Protestant Episcopal Church in Chestertown. He was friends with politician Samuel M. Crockett. The family had a home at The Winona in Baltimore.

Beck had tuberculosis, which caused him to use crutches. He died from influenza on April 5, 1923, at Johns Hopkins Hospital in Baltimore. He was buried at Chestertown Cemetery.
