= Adam Kuhn =

American physician

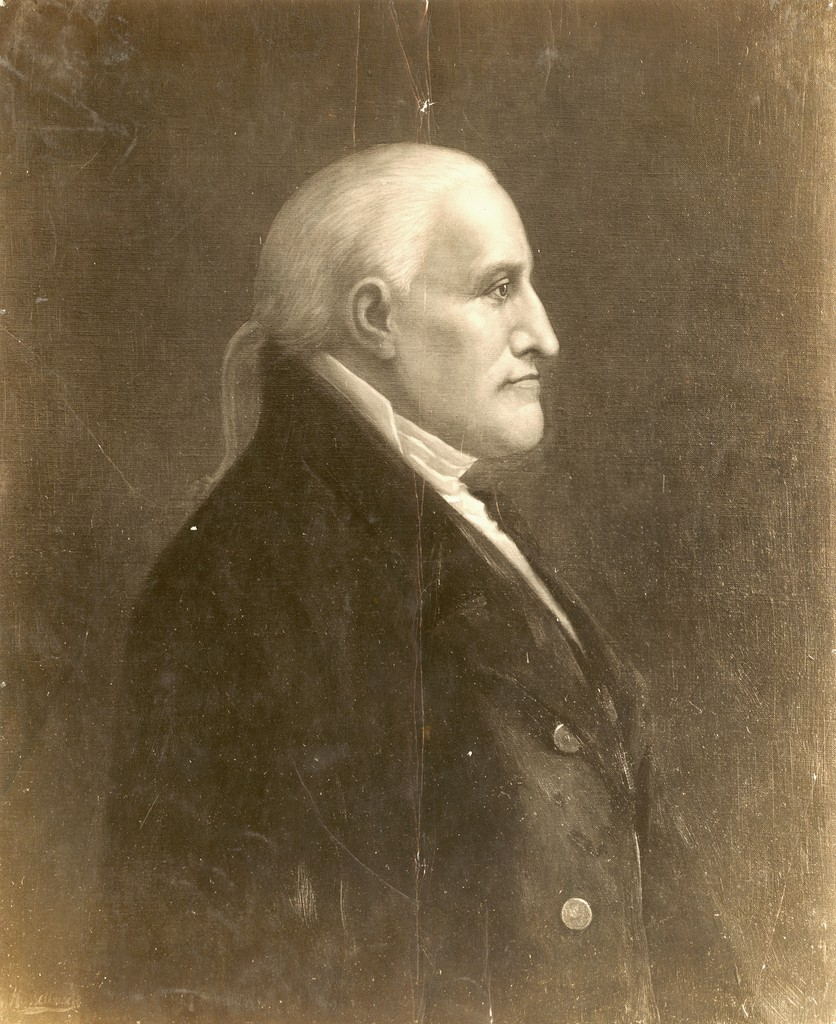
Adam Kuhn

Adam Kuhn (28 November 1741 – 5 July 1817) was an American physician and naturalist, and one of the earliest professors of medicine in a North American university.

== Formative years ==
Kuhn was born in Germantown, Province of Pennsylvania, a son of German immigrant parents. He studied medicine under his father, Dr. Adam Simon Kuhn. Then he went to Sweden and studied medicine and natural history 1761–1764 at Uppsala University, where he studied with Carl Linnaeus. Linnaeus named a flower in Kuhn's honor: Kuhnia eupatoriodes. He continued his studies at the University of Edinburgh, where he graduated as M.D. in June 1767, and published his thesis, De Lavatione frigida ('About cold baths').

== Medical career ==
Returning to America, he practiced as a physician in Philadelphia and was 1768–1789 professor of Materia medica and 1789–1797 of the Theory and Practice of Medicine at the Medical School of the College of Philadelphia (later the University of Pennsylvania), founded in 1765 as the first faculty of Medicine in the thirteen colonies. Concurrently, he was elected to the American Philosophical Society in 1768 where he served as its curator from 1769-1770 and 1771-1772.

Kuhn was a physician of the Pennsylvania Hospital from May 1775, until January 1798. He was one of the founders of the College of Physicians of Philadelphia in 1787, and was its president from July 1808 until his death. His students included Valentine Seaman, who mapped yellow fever mortality patterns in New York and introduced the smallpox vaccine to the United States in 1799.

Benjamin Rush wrote in his autobiography that Kuhn, after the death of Dr John Jones in June 1791, was considered the leading physician in Philadelphia and the one favored by "the principal officers of the general government". He treated "Washington Custes" (George Washington Custis, the son of Washington's stepson, see Martha Washington) and functioned as the family physician of George Washington. There is, however, no evidence that he actually treated the President.

== Other sources ==
- Biography of Adam Kuhn, at the website of the Archives of the University of Pennsylvania
- Charles A. Roos, "Physicians to the Presidents, and Their Patients: A Biobibliography", Bulletin of the Medical Library Association, vol 49 (1961), p. 291-360
