= Nasal =

Nasal /ˈneɪzəl/ is an adjective referring to the nose, part of human or animal anatomy. It may also be shorthand for the following uses in combination:

- With reference to the human nose:
  - Nasal administration, a method of pharmaceutical drug delivery
  - Nasal emission, the abnormal passing of oral air through a palatal cleft, or from some other type of pharyngeal inadequacy
  - Nasal hair, the hair in the nose
- With reference to phonetics:
  - Nasalization, the production of a sound with a lowered velum, allowing some of the air to escape through the nose; the resulting being either:
    - a nasal consonant, or
    - a nasal vowel
- With reference to the nose of humans or other animals:
  - Nasal bone, two small oblong bones placed side by side at the middle and upper part of the face, and form, by their junction, "the bridge" of the nose
  - Nasal cavity, a large air filled space above and behind the nose in the middle of the face
  - Nasal concha, a long, narrow and curled bone shelf which protrudes into the breathing passage of the nose
  - Nasal scale of reptiles

== Other uses ==
- Nasal, the medieval term for the nose guard of a helmet, such as in a nasal helm
- Năsal, a village in Țaga Commune, Cluj County, Romania
- Nasal language, Sumatra

== See also ==
- Nacelle, a cover housing (separate from the fuselage) that holds engines, fuel, or equipment on an aircraft
- Naso (disambiguation)
