= Marion C. Pfund =

American scientist

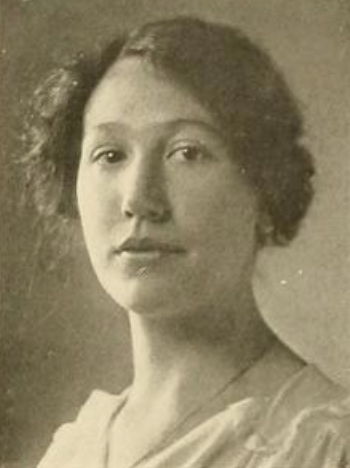
- Marion C. Pfund, from the 1919 yearbook of Simmons College
- Born: November 16, 1897; Boston, Massachusetts, U.S.
- Died: January 5, 2000 (age 102); La Jolla, California, U.S.
- Occupations: College professor, home economist, food chemist

Marion Caroline Pfund (November 16, 1897 – January 5, 2000) was an American home economist and college professor. She was on the home economics faculty of Cornell University from 1928 to 1953, dean of the College of Family Living at Brigham Young University from 1954 to 1958, and head of the home economics department at San Jose State College from 1958 to 1965.

== Early life and education ==
Pfund was born in Boston, Massachusetts, the daughter of Philip Friedrich Pfund and Caroline Augusta Hurlebaus Pfund. Her father was born in Germany. She graduated from Simmons College in 1919, earned a master's degree at Vassar College in 1921, and completed doctoral studies in organic chemistry at Yale University in 1928. Her dissertation was titled "The Preparation and Chemical Properties of Iodoisatin" (1928).

== Career ==
Pfund taught at Vassar from 1919 to 1924. She worked for a year at Calco Chemical Company, then joined the home economics faculty at Cornell University, where she taught from 1928 to 1953. She was co-dean of the College of Family Living at Brigham Young University from 1954 to 1958, and head of the home economics department at San Jose State College from 1958 to her retirement in 1965.

Pfund also spoke to community groups, including Sorosis, and her food research findings were printed as advice to home cooks in newspapers. During World War II, she taught Cornell students about poisonous gases and how to detect them.

Pfund was a fellow of the American Association for the Advancement of Science. She was president of Cornell's chapter of Phi Kappa Phi honor society. In 1943 she wrote and directed an educational film, Canning at Home. She represented the American Home Economics Association at Food and Drug Administration hearings on federal nutritional standards for bread in 1949. A room at Brigham Young University was named for Pfund in 1957.

== Publications and research ==
Pfund's research mainly involved the nutritional content of foods including apples and potatoes. She worked with Christine Heller on the use of dried brewer's yeast as a nutritional supplement. After the war, she worked with Elizabeth M. Elbert on custards. Her articles appeared in scholarly journals including Science, Journal of Food Science, Journal of Chemical Education, and Journal of Home Economics.

- "The Dinitro Derivatives of Para-Dichlorobenzene" (1922, with Annie Louise Macleod and Mary L. Kilpatrick)
- "Some Objective Tests on Potatoes" (1938)
- "The culinary quality of apples as determined by the use of New York state varieties" (1939)
- "Line-Spread as an Objective Test for Consistency" (1942, with Elizabeth A. Grawemeyer)
- "The Home Preparation and Preservation of Food" (1942)
- "Iron Content of Potatoes as Influenced by Cooking Method" (1942, with Helen West Nutting)
- "The Blackening of Cooked Potatoes" (1942, with Nutting)
- "Nature of darkening of cooked potatoes" (1942, with Nutting)
- "How to Can Your Quota" (1943)
- Chemistry and Food Preparation (1944, laboratory manual)
- "Venting Pressure Cookers: A Warning" (1944)
- "The Dissemination of Knowledge" (1945)

== Personal life ==
Pfund lived with her colleague and partner Jean I. Simpson in 1930. In 1940 and 1950 she lived with Sarah Isabel Bostwick. Pfund retired to La Jolla, California. She was an active swimmer past her 100th birthday. She died in the first week of 2000, at the age of 102.
