= Valentine Seaman =

American physician

- Born: April 2, 1770; New York City
- Died: July 3, 1817 (aged 47); New York City
- Education: University of Pennsylvania
- Occupation: Physician
- Years active: 1796–1817
- Known for: Introducing smallpox vaccination to the United States
- Children: 10

Signature
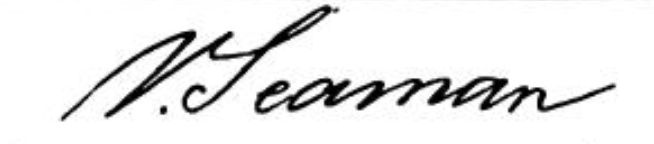

Valentine Seaman (April 2, 1770 – July 3, 1817) was an American physician who introduced the smallpox vaccine to the United States and mapped yellow fever in New York City. His contributions to public health also include women's education in nursing and midwifery.

== Early life and education ==
Seaman was born in 1770 in New York. His family were Quakers. His father, Willet Seaman, was a descendant of Captain John Seaman, who sailed to North America from Brightlington, England, in 1620, settling thereafter in Hempstead, Long Island.

Seaman began his studies in medicine in New York under Nicholas Romayne, one of the founders of Columbia University's College of Physicians and Surgeons. He earned his M.D. from the University of Pennsylvania in 1792, studying under Benjamin Rush and Adam Kuhn and writing a dissertation on opium use.

He settled in New York City on Beekman Street with his wife and 10 children.

== Public health work ==
Seaman was an attending surgeon at New York Hospital from 1796 until his death. He is best known for mapping the spread of yellow fever in New York City and introducing the smallpox vaccination to the United States.

=== Mapping of yellow fever ===
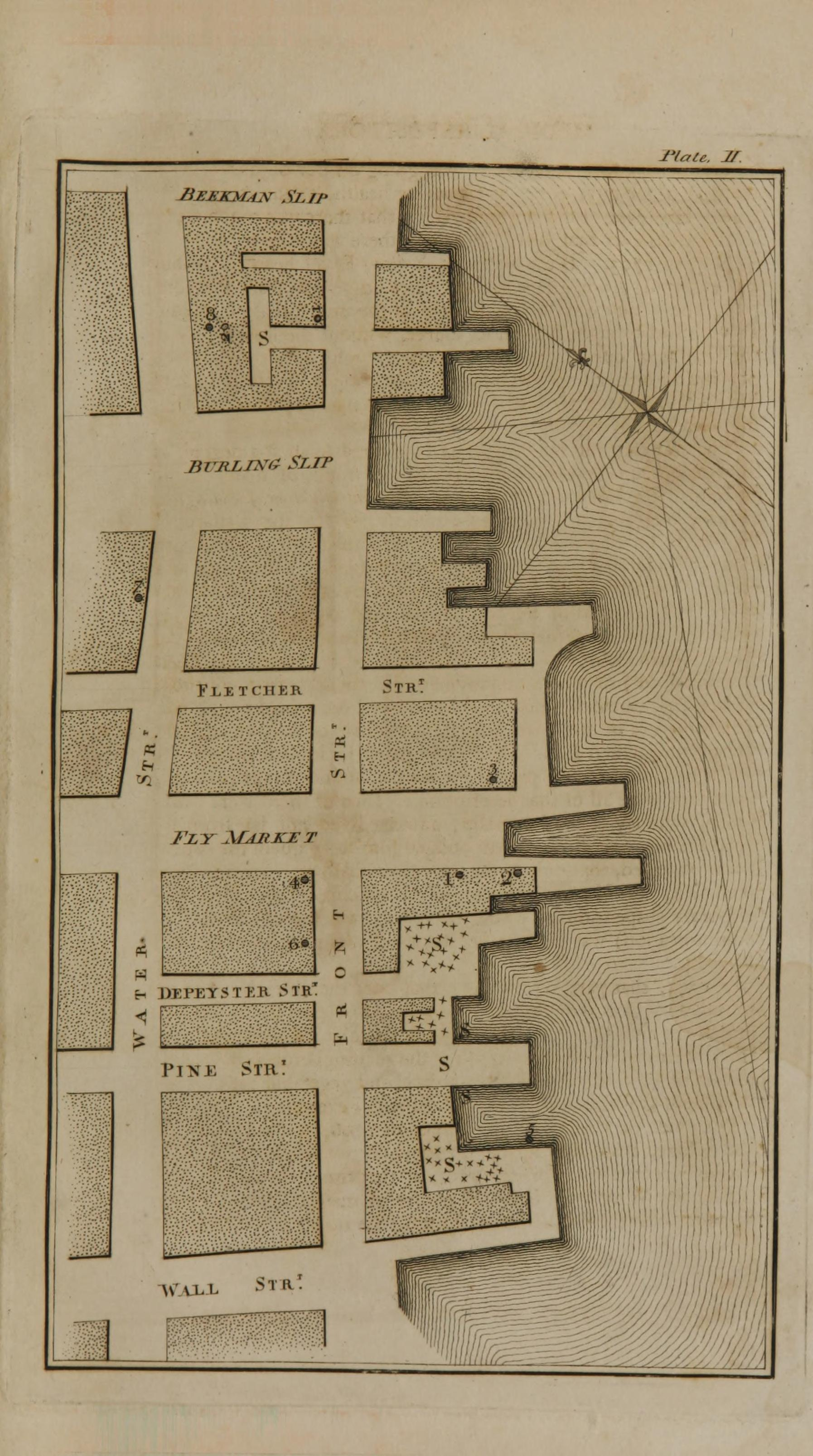
Seaman's map (plate 2 of 2), with yellow fever cases marked with dots and waste sites marked with S's and crosses

In 1795, yellow fever broke out in New York City. At the time, it was not known how yellow fever spread; some blamed incoming ships from the tropics. As the fever spread, Seaman mapped each case he could find in the New Slip area, marking which cases were fatal. He then mapped local waste sites, compared the two maps, and concluded that yellow fever originated in these waste areas. (While he did note that mosquitoes were present at the waste sites, he did not identify them correctly as the vectors for the disease.) He wrote, in a 1796 account of the epidemic, that he was indebted to Benjamin Rush for "innovations in the treatment of the Epidemic Fever of Philadelphia of 1793." The city's Committee of Health asked for his advice regarding the disease's cause and prevention; Seaman recommended filling in areas that were below sea-level and wherever water tended to stagnate, cleaning and paving streets, covering sewers, and filling in the areas beneath granaries and docks. A fuller account and the maps he created were published in An Inquiry into the Cause of the Prevalence of the Yellow Fever in New-York in 1798.

=== Introduction of vaccination to the United States ===
His first child, Betsy, died of smallpox in 1795, a tragedy that spurred Seaman to identify preventative measures. At the time, vaccinations were not understood or trusted in the United States. Edward Jenner, a British physician, had just introduced vaccination in England. Seaman acquired the vaccination serum from Jenner and, in 1799, successfully vaccinated his own children with it. They were the first people to be vaccinated in the United States. Seaman later became friends with Jenner. Seaman went on to advocate for vaccination. In 1802, he coordinated a system to provide free vaccinations to the poor in New York City.

=== Education ===
Seaman taught medicine as well, focusing in particular on women's education. In 1798–9, Seaman founded the first instructional classes for nurses at New York Hospital, which continued until 1817. Seaman was the first American physician to teach a class of women in midwifery in the almshouse (charitable housing for the poor). He wrote The Midwives Monitor in 1800 for their instruction.

== Legacy ==
Seaman, a Quaker, was against slavery and was a member of the New York Manumission Society, which advocated for the abolition of slavery in New York state.

He died at the age of 47 from tuberculosis, leaving behind a legacy of public health innovations and advocacy.

He had 10 children, including daughter Eliza Seaman Leggett, as well as sons John Ferris Seaman and Valentine Seaman (the younger), who owned an estate in 1855 in the Inwood area of upper Manhattan. There, they constructed "Seaman's Folly," including a castle and a structure now known as the Seaman-Drake Arch.

His papers (from 1795 to 1817) are housed at the Samuel J. Wood Library at Weill Cornell Medicine.

== Bibliography ==
- "Inaugural Discourse on Opium" (Philadelphia, 1792)
- An account of the epidemic yellow fever, as it appeared in the city of New-York in the year 1795 (1796)
- An inquiry into the cause of the prevalence of the yellow fever in New-York (1798)
- A dissertation on the mineral waters of Saratoga (1809)
- The Midwives Monitor (1800)
- A discourse upon vaccination, or kine-pock inoculation: with remarks upon the occasional prevalence of the small-pox, and the measures necessary to prevent it (1816)
