= Women In Astronomy Nepal =

Women In Astronomy Nepal (WIAN) was established on November 1, 2015 A.D. in order to provide a common platform for all the women interested in astronomy and in Nepal. It is a sub unit within Nepal Astronomical Society (NASO). WIAN is primarily concerned with young females pursuing their career in Science, Technology, Engineering and Mathematics (STEM).

== Programs ==
- Women in Outreach
- Women in Science Award (WiSA)
- Publication
