= John Brodhead Beck =

American physician

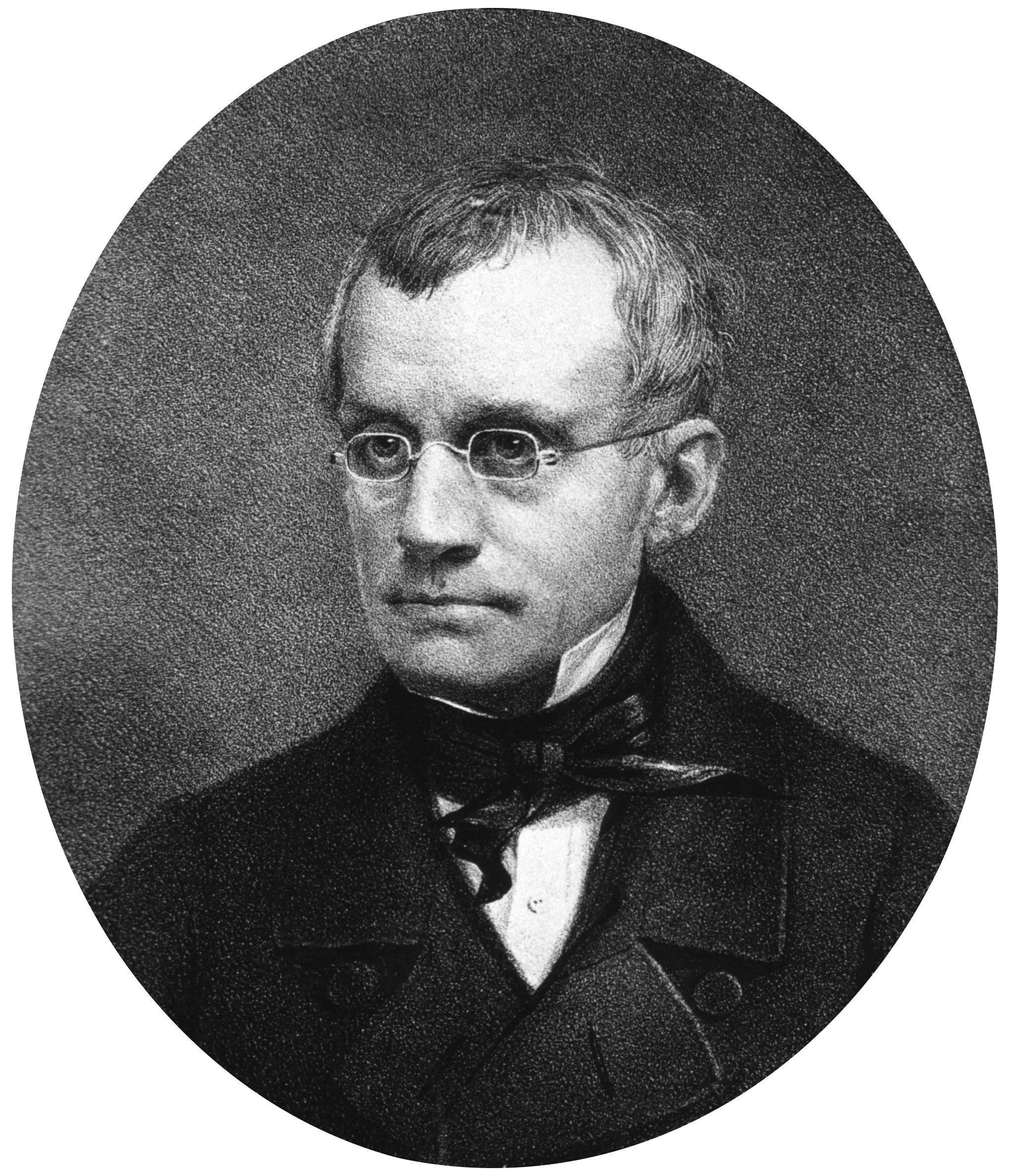
- Born: September 18, 1794; Schenectady, New York, U.S.
- Died: April 9, 1851; Rhinebeck New York, U.S.
- Occupation: Physician
- Medical career
- Institutions: Columbia University

John Brodhead Beck (18 September 1794 Schenectady, New York – 9 April 1851 Rhinebeck, New York) was a New York medical doctor who was an authority on miscarriage, abortion, infant physiology, and associated forensic issues.

== Biography ==
He was the third son of Caleb Beck and Catharine Theresa Romeyn, only daughter of Rev. Theodorick Romeyn, D.D., long principal of the Academy of Schenectady, and one of the founders of Union College.

While yet a child, in 1798, John Beck lost his father. After that, the care of his education and that of his four brothers, Theodorick Romeyn, Nicholas Fairly, Lewis Caleb, and Abraham, rested chiefly with his mother.

At the age of 7, John left his home to reside with his uncle, John B. Romeyn, then pastor of the Reformed Dutch Church in Rhinebeck, New York. Here he began his classical studies. In 1804, Romeyn moved to New York City, his nephew accompanying him, and the young man's education continued. In 1809, Beck entered Columbia College, of which his uncle was a trustee, and where John M. Mason was provost.

At Columbia, Mason was Beck's mentor throughout his college career. In 1813, Beck graduated with the highest honors of his class, and he was later appointed a trustee of the College. Immediately after his graduation, Beck accompanied his uncle in a voyage to Europe, and spending some time in London, he there applied himself to the study of Hebrew, under the instruction of a Rev. Mr. Humphries, a grandson of Doddridge. Beck learned enough to later take an intelligent interest in Biblical criticism.

On his return from England, having determined to study medicine, Beck joined the office of David Hosack. Later medical politics would estrange them, though each always retained a high estimate of the learning and ability of the other. In 1817, Beck graduated from the New York College of Physicians and Surgeons. His thesis was a treatise entitled "On Infanticide." The treatise was subsequently incorporated into his brother T. Romeyn Beck's noted work on medical jurisprudence, and became the standard work on infanticide in the English language.

In 1822, Beck, in company with Drs. Dyckman and Francis, established the New York Medical and Physical Journal. Beck devoted a large portion of his time to this journal, and published many of his own articles in it. Among Beck's papers may be specially mentioned his paper on laryngitis and several reviews on the contagiousness of yellow fever. Beck continued as the chief editor of the Medical and Physical Journal for seven years, in later years associated with Dr. Peixotto.

In 1826, he was elected professor of materia medica and botany in the New York College of Physicians and Surgeons. His appointment stemmed from the simultaneous resignation of all the previous faculty. This mass resignation, the crowning act of a long series of dissensions, threw upon the successors a weight of responsibility difficult to bear. Beck was prompt to take on his share of this weight, and his ability as a controversialist was too well known, and had been too sorely felt, not to insure to him a full share in any odium which the friends of the old could throw on the leaders of the new organization. Beck did well as a teacher, and also served the College as a zealous promoter of its interests, and a ready defender of its policy.

In 1835, Beck was appointed as a physician of the New York Hospital, a situation which he filled for ten years. His services at the Hospital had a very favorable effect on Beck's reputation as a practitioner. Hitherto, his brethren had known him only as, for his age, a learned physician, a practised and able writer, and a judicious and attractive lecturer. At the Hospital, he proved himself sagacious in investigating disease at the bedside, and skillful in the application of remedies. Beck aimed to be judicious in the use of a few remedies, rather than to overwhelm disease by a multitude of cures.

As a practitioner, he did not lose the opportunity of giving to the students and young physicians connected with the establishment clinical lessons. His was distinguished by great simplicity of language, clearness, and a devotion to utility rather than show. In 1843, he collected together, and published in a volume, a few of the most important of his contributions to periodical medical literature. In 1849, his work on infantile therapeutics appeared, and was received well both at home and abroad.

When a very young man, Beck was elected trustee of the College of Physicians and Surgeons, and censor of the County Medical Society. He later held the offices of vice president and president of the County Medical Society, vice president and then president of the State Medical Society, before which he delivered an inaugural address on the history of American medicine before the Revolution, which was afterwards published. He took an earnest interest in the organization of the New York Academy of Medicine, and was early elected one of its vice presidents, and, subsequently, orator. Failing health compelled him to decline the latter duty.

For the last few years of his life he was a martyr to neuralgia and spasmodic disease from which his sufferings were most intense. He continued to visit patients and to lecture in the College till the beginning of the session of 1850–51. His funeral, two days after his death, was attended by almost all the more eminent members of the profession in the city. An address was delivered by the Rev. Dr. Knox, an old friend.

Beck's intellect was characterized by energy: an end being set before him, he pursued it with a vigor, a steadiness of purpose, and a force of will which rarely failed to command success. He also had a clarity of perception: he saw the object presented to his "mind's eye" with all the distinctness of the most perfect physical vision. This quality was undoubtedly the secret of much of his success as a practitioner of medicine, and a medical writer and teacher. He saw disease just as it was; theories never distorted, nor did prejudice obscure it: all was clear and perfectly distinct from every other object. Having this quality in so eminent a degree, and being both in English and the classics a thorough scholar, he could not fail, as a teacher, to communicate in words a just and accurate idea of the object before him. So in argument and controversy, he saw the question to be discussed, or the point in dispute clearly; it was perfectly definite to his apprehension, and consequently his arguments neither fell short of, nor flew beyond the point.

Beck's success as a teacher has already been noticed. He united qualities often seen apart, that made him both useful and popular. His lectures were clear, precise, and singularly practical: no merely specious theories, no rash generalizations, no loose assertions, found place there; all was logical, accurate, true. When the lecture was over, with a ready courtesy he answered the questions and solved the doubts of his pupils, and removed, by repeated and varied illustration, the difficulties in the way of their perfect comprehension of a subject.

In regard to personal character, Beck exhibited a steady adherence to principle, an ardent love of truth, an unhesitating, unwavering, almost instinctive preference of the right over the expedient. He was a member of the Reformed Dutch Church, the church of his forefathers.

== Writings ==
In addition to his thesis treatise, his major publications include:

- Medical Essays (1843)
- Infant Therapeutics (1849)
- Historical Sketch of the State of Medicine in the Colonies (1850)

== Family ==
Beck's mother lived to be 85 and survive four of her sons. In 1831, John Beck married Anne Tucker, eldest daughter of Fanning C. Tucker, who, with five children, survived him. Two of Beck's brothers, Theodoric Romeyn Beck and Lewis Caleb Beck, were distinguished physicians.
