= Matthew H. Webster =

Adjutant General of New York (1803–1846)

- Born: 2 November 1803; Albany, New York, US
- Died: 28 July 1846 (aged 42); Manhattan, New York, US
- Burial place: Sixteenth Street Baptist Church Vaults, Chelsea, Manhattan, New York, US
- Alma mater: Union College
- Spouse: Harriet Rosanna Cullen (m. 1837–1846)
- Children: 6
- Military career
- Service: New York Militia
- Service years: 1825 (est.)–1831
- Rank: Brigadier General
- Units: 3rd Brigade, 1st Cavalry Division, New York Militia
- Commands: Adjutant General of New York
- Other work: Attorney

Matthew H. Webster (22 November 1803 – 28 July 1846) was an American attorney, scientist, and militia officer from Albany, New York. He served as Adjutant General of New York from 1830 to 1831.

A native of Albany and the son of a well-known newspaper editor, he graduated from The Albany Academy and Union College and became an attorney in Albany. He was also active in the Albany Institute of History & Art as its corresponding secretary. He studied and wrote on scientific topics including chemistry and meteorology. Webster was also active in the militia; after the 1830 death of his law partner, who was serving as adjutant general, the governor appointed Webster to fill the vacancy, and he served until 1831.

== Early life ==
Matthew Henry Webster (Note: Sometimes known as "M. Henry Webster.") was born in Albany, New York on 2 November 1803, a son of prominent newspaper publisher Charles R. Webster and Cynthia (Steel) Webster. (Note: The baptism record for Webster gives his name as "Henry Matthew.") He was raised and educated in Albany, and began attendance at The Albany Academy in 1815. At the 1818 end of year ceremonies, Webster received a prize for his proficiency in Algebra. He graduated in 1819, and was one of the senior class commencement speakers. He received his Bachelor of Arts degree from Union College in 1822 and was one the graduation speakers. While in college, Webster became a member of the Philomathean Society; in 1825, his degree was revised to a Master of Arts. Among Webster's additional activities was membership in the Bible Society of Union College, including a term as secretary.

Webster was fluent in several languages, including Greek, German and French; (Note: The article in The Gateway incorrectly refers to Webster as "senator", perhaps confusing him with Daniel Webster or presuming he had served in the state senate.) his facility with languages other than English caused some acquaintances, including William H. Seward, to recommend him for chairman of the language department at the University of Virginia. Webster chose to remain in New York and pursue a career in the law. According to Henry James, Webster was a close friend of Joseph Henry, and they worked together on scientific studies and experiments. In addition, James wrote that Webster had invested in an enterprise (unnamed by James) recommended by the president of the bank where Webster maintained accounts; the venture proved successful, and Webster became wealthy as a result.

== Start of career ==
Webster's varied interests included politics, government, philosophy, literature, and science. In the early 1820s, he served as recording secretary of the Albany Lyceum. In addition, he held leadership roles in what is now the Albany Institute of History & Art. As the corresponding secretary he exchanged letters and reports with individuals and scientific societies nationwide; including a resident of Natchez, Mississippi who provided details on a tornado he witnessed. Webster built a reputation as a scientist and scholar, including work in chemistry, meteorology, astronomy, and geology; his position as corresponding secretary of the Albany Institute enabled him to create an information exchange network with the Royal Society in London and scientific associations in several other countries.

In 1825, Webster was one of several individuals appointed by the governor as commissioners to acknowledge the transfer of deeds and other documents during property purchases and sales. Webster also studied law and he was admitted to the bar in 1826. At different times, Webster's law partners included George W. Clinton and Nicholas F. Beck. He was also an incorporator and secretary of the Albany County Agricultural Society. Webster's business ventures included the Clinton Insurance Company, of which he was an original incorporator. In 1828, Webster and Stephen Van Rensselaer were elected honorary members of the Geological Society of Jena, recognition that was conferred to recognize their contributions to Earth science.

== Continued career ==
Webster was also active in the New York Militia in the 1820s, and his assignments included inspector of the organization's 3rd Brigade, 1st Cavalry Division with the rank of major. In 1830, Beck died while serving as Adjutant General of New York; the governor appointed Webster to fill the vacancy with the rank of brigadier general and he served until 1831. Webster was succeeded by John Adams Dix.

In 1833, Webster was appointed secretary of the Lancaster School, an Albany institution founded in 1811 to teach poor and working class children whose parents could not afford private school tuition by employing the "Lancasterian system", an educational approach in which older students assisted in instructing younger ones. Webster also became active in politics as a Whig; in July 1834, he was one of the secretaries of the party committee that awarded US Representative Dudley Selden a vote of thanks for obtaining federal funds to improve navigation on the Hudson River. In October 1834, he was selected as a Second Ward delegate to the Albany County convention that nominated candidates for county offices. In 1836, he became editor of the Zodiac, an Albany-based literary and historical monthly magazine. In 1837, he was elected to the board of trustees of the institution now known as the Albany Public Library. In June 1838, Webster became a partner in the Albany Hollow Ware Factory, a business that produced pots, pans, kettles, stoves, and other metal items.

== Later career ==
In May 1840, Webster was chairman of the Whig party committee in his ward that endorsed the presidential candidacy of William Henry Harrison. In July 1840, he was elected one of the vice presidents of the city's Whig general committee. In September 1840, he was a featured speaker at a major Harrison rally in Albany. In April 1842, he chaired the 10th Ward committee that nominated Whig candidates for local offices. Webster was a member of the American Association of Geologists, and attended its May 1843 annual meeting, which took place in Albany. In September 1843, he was chosen as a delegate from the 8th Ward to the Whig convention that nominated candidates for Albany County offices.

Webster died of tuberculosis in Manhattan on 28 July 1846. He was buried at the Sixteenth Street Baptist Church Vaults in the Chelsea neighborhood of Manhattan. According to a widely republished newspaper obituary, Webster's generosity and efforts to aid the less fortunate during his life left his wife and children unprovided for after his sudden death, and the writer solicited donations on their behalf. Mrs. Webster was a resident of The Heights neighborhood of Jersey City, New Jersey when she died in January 1894.
