= Eliza Seaman Leggett =

American suffragist and abolitionist

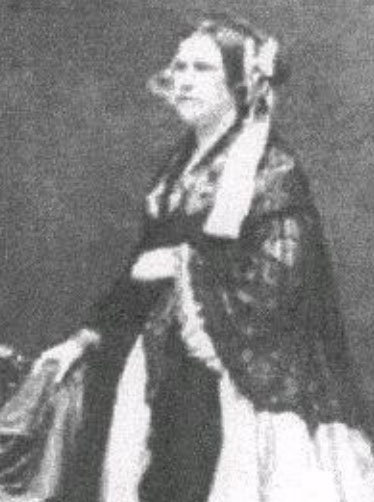
- Born: May 9, 1815; New York, New York
- Died: February 8, 1900 (aged 84); Drayton Plains, Michigan
- Spouse: Augustus W. Leggett (m. 1836–1855) his death

Eliza Seaman Leggett (May 9, 1815 – February 8, 1900) was an American suffragist and abolitionist.

== Biography ==
Leggett was born on May 9, 1815, in New York City, at 90 (later 21) Beekman Street to parents Valentine Seaman and Anna Ferris. Her father died in 1817, and she (the youngest of ten children) was the last child still living in the family home. Following his death, she spent her summers with William Hicks, a wealthy merchant. She met Augustus Wright Leggett, and would marry him in 1836. They spent a short time in Peekskill, New York, before moving to Hempstead, New York, and in 1852, they moved to Michigan, spending time in Pontiac and Clintonville, before settling in Detroit.

Their home served as a stop on the Underground Railroad, and was also visited by many Progressives, including Amos Bronson Alcott, Julia Ward Howe and Sojourner Truth. She was also involved in the suffrage movement. Leggett advocated for public water fountains in Detroit, becoming one of the major reasons that the city eventually created public drinking fountains, and was largely responsible for first public restrooms in stores in the city. She also heavily promoted Columbus Day. Leggett was the driving force behind the establishment of Belle Isle Park as a park. She was a founder of the Detroit Woman's Club.

She knew and corresponded with many authors, including William Ellery Channing, Washington Irving, Theodore Parker, Amos Bronson Alcott, Charles A. Dana, William Cullen Bryant, Walt Whitman, Louisa May Alcott, Ralph Waldo Emerson and Lucretia Mott. Leggett also worked with Helen Eliza Benson Lloyd Garrison, Lyman Beecher, Laura Smith Haviland, and Elizabeth Comstock. Leggett died on February 8, 1900, in Drayton Plains, Michigan.

She was inducted into the Michigan Women's Hall of Fame in 2003. She also has a Waterford Elementary school named after her, in her honor. The school has since closed, but is home to a branch of the Waterford senior center.
