= Elgin Botanic Garden =

Former botanical garden in New York City

Coordinates: 40.7586°N 73.9788°W

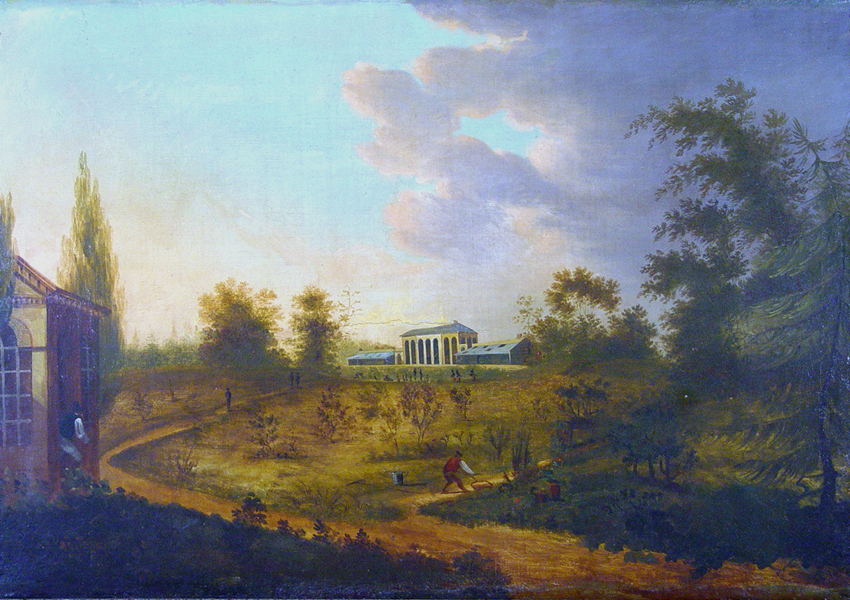
- Painting of the Elgin Botanic Garden, c. 1810
- Location: New York City
- Area: 19 3/4 acres (8.0 ha)
- Established: 1801

The Elgin Botanic Garden was the first public botanical garden in the United States. Located in what is now Manhattan in New York City, it was established in 1801 by New York physician David Hosack. By 1810, Hosack was no longer able to fund the garden's expenses, and sold the land to the State of New York. The property was given to Columbia College in 1814, and the gardens were abandoned. In the 1920s, it became the site of Rockefeller Center.

== Establishment and development ==
In 1801, New York physician David Hosack created the Elgin Botanic Garden, named for his father's Scottish birthplace. Hosack was among the leading medical practitioners of his time, and was later remembered primarily as the physician who attended the 1804 duel between his friends Alexander Hamilton and Aaron Burr, and who treated Hamilton's fatal injuries.

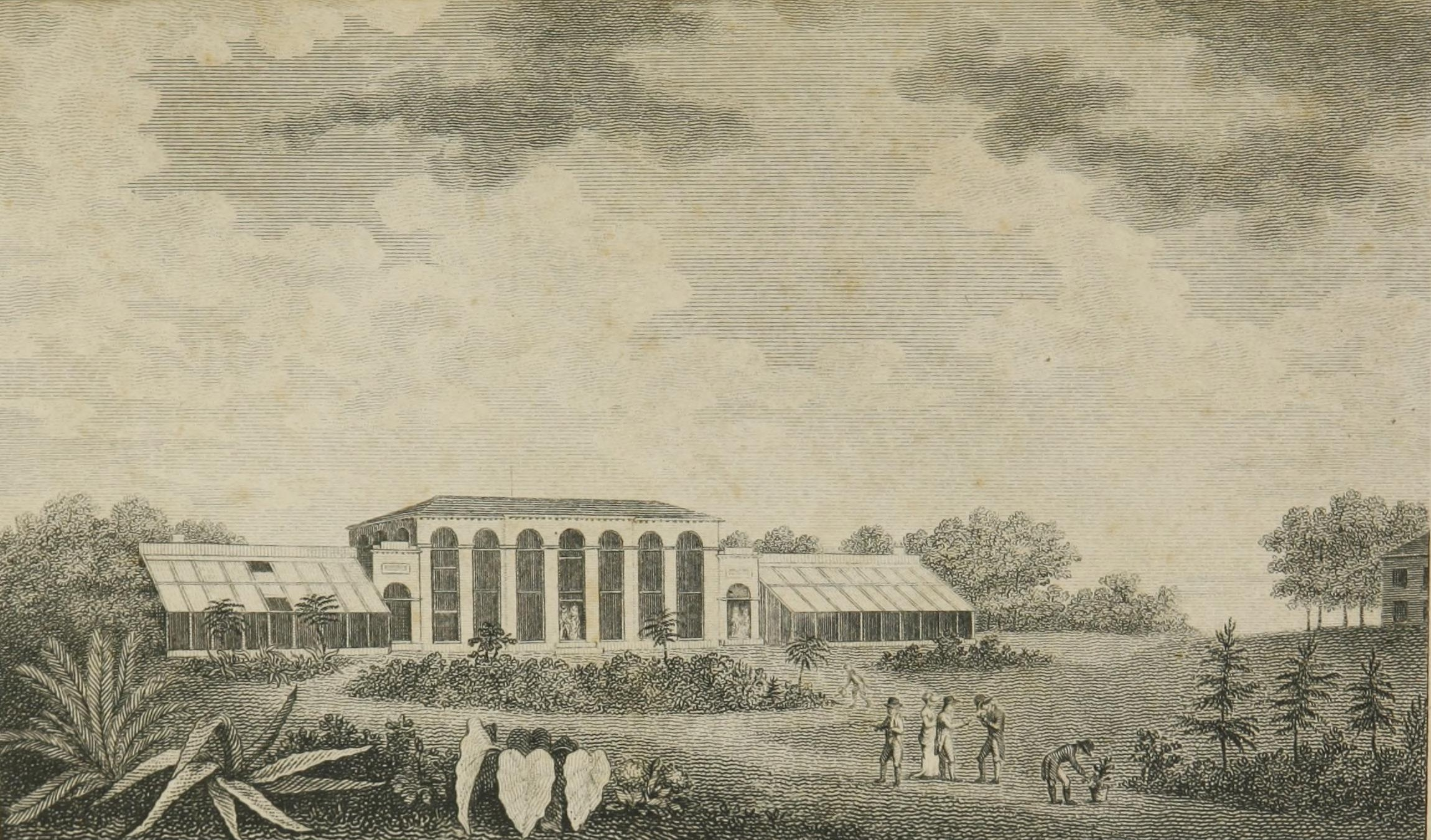
Engraving (c. 1802) of a drawing by L. Simond, titled View of the Botanic Garden at Elgin in the vicinity of the City of New York

Elgin was the first public botanical garden in the United States. It was established with Hosack's purchase of 19 3/4 acres (8.0 ha) of "common lands" from the City of New York for approximately $4,800, equivalent to $114,000 in 2024 dollars. The location, 3 1/2 miles (5.6 km) outside of what was then the city limit, is bounded by present-day 47th Street on the south, 51st Street on the north, and Fifth Avenue on the east, reaching nearly to Sixth Avenue on the west. It is now the site of Rockefeller Center.

The entire property "was intended by Professor Hosack for a botanical garden, the prime object of which was to be the collection and cultivation of native plants of this country, especially such as possess medicinal properties or are otherwise useful." At his own expense, Hosack landscaped the garden with a variety of indigenous and exotic plants, mostly of American origin. By 1805, the garden was home to 1,500 species of plants from all over the world, including some rare specimens contributed by Thomas Jefferson. The following year, Hosack published Hortus Elginensis (1806), a catalogue and visitors' guide, containing an extensive list of the plants under cultivation at Elgin.

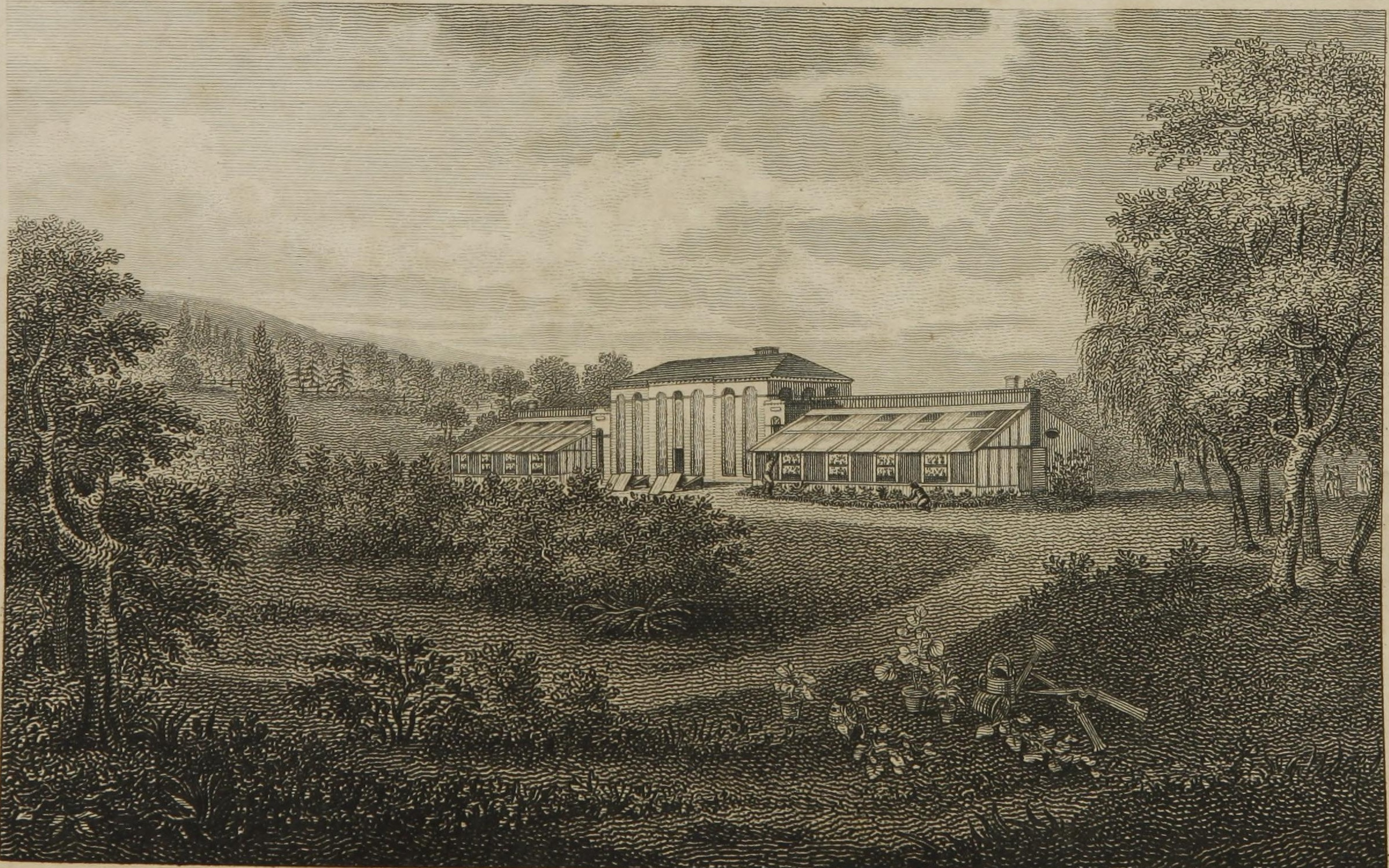
Drawing of Elgin by Reinagle, frontispiece of Hosack's Hortus Elginensis catalogue (2nd ed., 1811)

The grounds were fully enclosed by an imposing stone wall, 7 feet (2.1 m) tall and 2 1/2 feet (0.76 m) thick. Within the walls, a spacious greenhouse flanked by two hothouses presented a 180-foot (55 m) frontage running west from present-day Fifth Avenue, and encircled by what Hosack called a "belt of forest trees and shrubs judiciously chequered and mingled."

Hosack's funds were insufficient to support such a project indefinitely, and it was suggested that he was so preoccupied with his endeavors in the creation of a new medical school that he had neither time nor money to continue the garden. In 1808, Hosack was compelled to offer the property for sale, and for several years, he petitioned the New York State Legislature to purchase it and maintain it as an aid in medical education. Ultimately, in March 1810, the State of New York purchased Elgin for $75,000, leaving Hosack with a loss of $28,000 after his expenses to buy and develop the property.

Responsibility for the property was given to the Board of Regents of the University of the State of New York, and in the 1811 second edition of the Hortus Elginensis catalogue, a frontispiece identified Elgin as "the Botanic Garden of the State of New-York". In a preface dated March 1811, Hosack wrote that Elgin had "been purchased by the State for the benefit of the Medical Schools of New-York", and projected his expectation that it would remain a permanent institution. The catalogue concluded with a note that "improvements which may hereafter take place in this institution, and the additions which may be made to the collection of plants, will in future be regularly published, as an annual report to the Legislature, and the Regents of the University." Hosack continued to pay the garden's expenses until May 1811, when it was placed under the management of the College of Physicians and Surgeons, which had not yet merged with Columbia.

The Commissioners' Plan of 1811 that laid out the scheme for New York City's future grid of streets and avenues gave names to the carriage road leading to Elgin's garden, which became Sixth Avenue, and to the pathway that fronted Elgin's south-facing greenhouses, which became 50th Street.

== Abandonment and later uses ==
In April 1814, the New York legislature voted to transfer the land to Columbia College, with the provision that the college would be moved to the site, although Columbia successfully lobbied for the removal of that condition in 1819. Columbia had no interest in continuing to maintain the costly botanical garden, and turned over responsibility for the gardens to Clement Clarke Moore, best known as a writer and light poet.

Beginning in March 1817, the property was leased to a series of individual tenants paying little or no rent, in return for obligations to maintain the grounds, while repeated applications from Hosack for a lease (in 1819, 1825, and 1828) were denied. By 1823, the property had sunk "into utter decrepitude", and the abandoned botanical gardens eventually fell into decay. Surviving plant specimens were shipped to Morningside Heights where they were replanted at the Bloomingdale Asylum, and Hosack's library of horticultural texts became part of the collection of the New York Botanical Garden in the Bronx.

The property became known as Columbia's "Upper Estate," and by 1879, twelve acres had been fully developed for residential use, with 298 rowhouses in a then-stylish neighborhood. By the mid-1920s, however, it had deteriorated into "an unseemly collection of boarding houses, nightclubs and speakeasies on the northern boundary of New York's theater district."

In late 1928, Columbia University agreed to lease a three-block portion of the land to John D. Rockefeller Jr. for the construction of Rockefeller Center, in return for approximately $3.5 million annual rent until 1952, followed by options for three 21-year renewals. Rockefeller subsequently acquired additional lots from Columbia, as well as surrounding properties. The original property was still owned by Columbia until 1985, when it was sold for $400 million.

== In popular culture ==
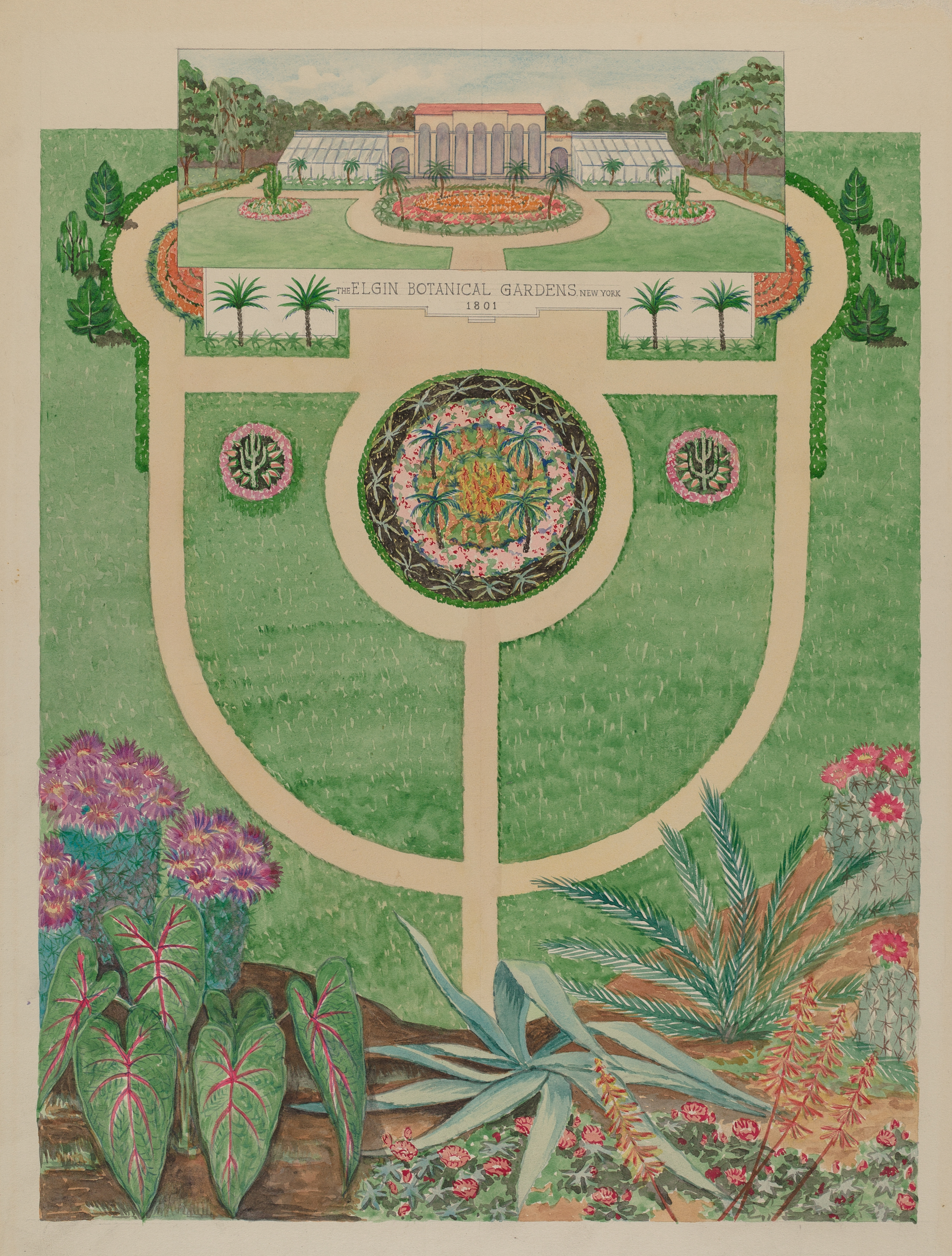
- Tabea Hosier, Elgin Botanical Gardens c. 1936, watercolor and graphite on paperboard, The National Gallery of Art, Washington, D.C.
  In the 1930s, The Federal Art Project sponsored the Index of American Design which "produced a pictorial survey of the crafts and decorative arts of the United States from the early colonial period to 1900. Artists working for the Index produced nearly 18,000 meticulously faithful watercolor drawings, documenting material culture by largely anonymous artisans." Artist Tabea Hosier produced an enduring representation of Elgin Botanical Gardens.
- In the 1960s, New York artist Frederick Elmiger (1890–1975) painted Elgin Botanic Garden, part of a series of imagined scenes from New York City's early history. The brightly colored painting, in watercolor and gouache, depicts elegantly dressed New Yorkers strolling on a garden path on a sunny spring day, with Elgin's greenhouses in the background.
