= Annie Louise Macleod =

Canadian–American academic (1883–1971)

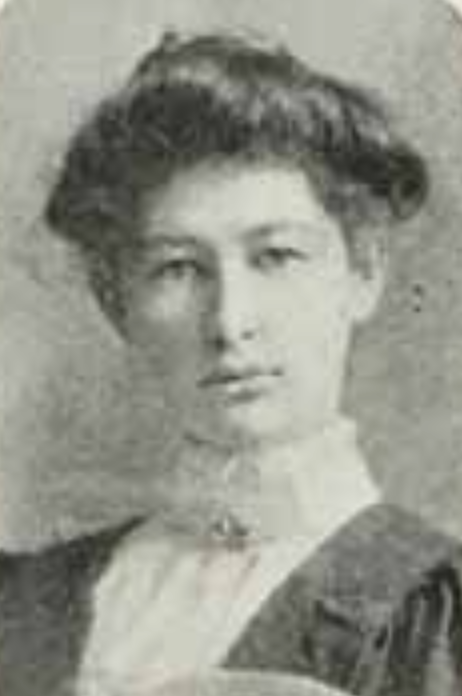
- Annie Louise Macleod, from the 1904 yearbook of McGill University
- Born: February 7, 1883; Glace Bay, Nova Scotia, Canada
- Died: September 29, 1971 (aged 88); Sarasota, Florida, U.S.
- Occupations: Home economist, chemist, college dean

Annie Louise Macleod (February 7, 1883 – September 29, 1971) was a Canadian home economist, college dean, and chemist. She was the first student to earn a Ph.D. in chemistry at McGill University, and the first woman to complete a Ph.D. at McGill. She was dean of the School of Home Economics at Syracuse University from 1928 to 1948.

== Early life and education ==
Macleod was from Glace Bay, Nova Scotia; she was raised in the household of her stepfather and mother, James Forbes and Margaret A. Forbes. She earned bachelor's, master's, and doctoral degrees at McGill University. In 1910 she completed doctoral studies in chemistry at McGill, and was the first woman to earn a Ph.D. from McGill, and the first student to complete a Ph.D. in chemistry there.

== Career ==
Macleod worked at Barnard College and Bryn Mawr College in her early career. At Vassar College from 1914 to 1928, she was a chemistry professor, chaired the school's Division of Euthenics, and directed its Summer Institute. In 1928 she succeeded Florence E. S. Knapp as dean of the College of Home Economics at Syracuse University. She retired from Syracuse in 1948, after she fractured her hip in a fall. Syracuse commissioned a portrait painting of Macleod in 1957.

Macleod was a consulting editor for the McGraw-Hill Publishing Company. She also lectured to community and conference audiences about home economics and women's education. She organized a series of radio lectures on WGR in 1930. She was elected a fellow of the American Association for the Advancement of Science in 1934.

== Publications ==
- Text Book of Chemistry for Nurses and Students of Home Economics (1920, 1928)
- "The Dinitro Derivatives of Para-Dichlorobenzene" (1922, with Marion C. Pfund and Mary L. Kilpatrick)
- "Euthenics at Vassar" (1926, with Mary A. Griggs)
- "Euthenics" (1927)
- Chemistry and Cookery (1930, with Edith H. Nason)
- "Home Economics: A Liberal Education" (1945, with Mary A. Griggs)

== Personal life ==
Macleod lived with her Syracuse colleague Edith H. Nason. Macleod and Nason planned a move to Michigan together in 1949, and retired to Florida in 1952. Nason died in 1970, and Macleod died in 1971, in Sarasota, Florida, at the age of 88.
