= Nason =

Nason may refer to:

- Nason (surname), an English surname

== Places ==
- Nason, Suriname, a village in Suriname
- Nason, Illinois, a city, United States
- Nason House, a historic house in Las Cruces, New Mexico, United States

== See also ==
- Nasŏn (or Naseon), the South Korean name of Rason, a city in North Korea
- Nasonville, Rhode Island, an unincorporated community, United States
- Nasonville, Wisconsin, an unincorporated community, United States
