= Jens Tolv Beck =

Norwegian politician (1890–1939)

Jens Tolv Beck (16 April 1890 – 11 February 1939) was a Norwegian farmer and politician for the Agrarian Party.

He was born in Horten as a son of bank treasurer Christian Barth Beck (1846–1904) and Louise Steenberg (1861–1929). He finished middle school in 1906, then Fosnes Agricultural School in 1910 and was a tenant at several farms; from 1917 to 1919 in Sweden. In 1924 he bought the farm Søndre Ruus in Nittedal Municipality where he later settled. His specialty was poultry breeding.

He was elected as a deputy representative to the Parliament of Norway in 1936 from the constituency Akershus. He died in February 1939, before the end of the term.
