= Edith H. Nason =

American food scientist

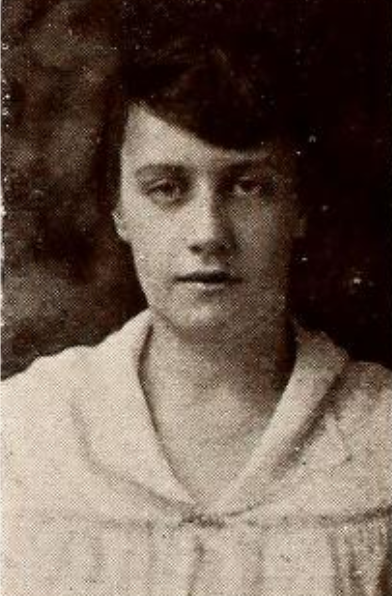
- Edith H. Nason, from the 1917 yearbook of Vassar College
- Born: June 12, 1895; Salem, Massachusetts, U.S.
- Died: January 9, 1970 (age 74); Sarasota, Florida, U.S.
- Occupations: Food scientist, home economist

Edith Holloway Nason (June 12, 1895 – January 9, 1970) was an American food chemist. She was a professor of home economics and nutrition at Cornell University and Syracuse University. She was a vice-president of the American Home Economics Association in the 1940s.

== Early life and education ==
Nason was born in Salem, Massachusetts, the daughter of Benjamin Franklin Nason and Anna Moore Hanson Nason. Her younger sister Mary married Charles Boardman Newhall, a lawyer and mountaineer who was also president of the American Badminton Association.

Nason graduated from Vassar College in 1917, and completed doctoral studies in chemistry at Yale University in 1921, supported in part by a Vassar Alumnae Fellowship.

== Career ==
Nason taught chemistry at the University of Illinois from 1921 to 1925. She was a professor of home economics at Cornell University and head of the department of foods and nutrition at Syracuse University. In 1931 she spoke at Oklahoma A&M College about "Chemistry and Physics in Relation to Cookery and Nutrition", and at the Syracuse University Club of Scranton. She was a vice-president of the American Home Economics Association in the 1940s.

== Publications ==
- "On the Dinitro Derivatives of p-Dichlorobenzene: 2,5-Dichloro-1,4-Dinitrobenzene" (1918)
- "Fractional Distillation Apparatus" (1923)
- "The Utilization of Cassia Oil for the Synthesis of Cinnamyl Alcohol" (1925, with Arthur J. Hill)
- "The importance of maintaining interest in chemistry in the teaching of students of home economics" (1925)
- "Try This on your Ice Box" (1927)
- Chemistry and Cookery (1937, with Annie Louise Macleod)
- Introduction to Experimental Cookery (1939, with Alice E. Ebersold)
- "Research in Foods" (1942)
- "Recent Trends in Frozen Foods" (1947)

== Personal life ==
Nason lived with her Syracuse colleague Annie Louise Macleod. Nason and Macleod moved to Michigan in 1949, and retired to Florida together in 1952. Nason died in 1970, in Sarasota, Florida, at the age of 74.
