= Nicholas Romayne =

American physician

- Born: September 1756; Hackensack, Province of New Jersey
- Died: July 21, 1817 (aged 60); New York City
- Occupation: Physician
- Known for: First President of the New York Medical Society

Nicholas Romayne (September 1756, in Hackensack, New Jersey – 21 July 1817, in New York City) was a physician of the United States.

== Biography ==
He was the son of a silversmith, and received great educational advantages. At the beginning of the American Revolutionary War, he went to Edinburgh, where he was known as an able scholar, and took the degree of M.D., presenting a thesis entitled “De Generatione Puris,” which was at one time famous. He subsequently studied in Paris, London, and Leyden, and on his return settled in Philadelphia, and then in New York City, where he practised his profession.

He embarked in the William Blount conspiracy in instigating the Cherokee and Creek Indians to aid the British in their attempt to conquer the Spanish territory in Louisiana in 1797. He was seized and imprisoned, and subsequently again visited Europe.

He was the first president of the New York Medical Society, and of the New York College of Physicians and Surgeons, of which he was a founder, and in which he taught anatomy and the institutes of medicine. His students included Valentine Seaman, who mapped the 1795 yellow fever epidemic in New York and introduced the smallpox vaccine to the United States in 1799. Dr. John W. Francis said of him: “He was unwearied in toil and of mighty energy, dexterous in legislative bodies, and at one period of his career was vested with almost all the honors the medical profession can bestow.”

Romayne published an address before the students of the New York College of Physicians and Surgeons on The Ethnology of the Red Man in America (New York, 1808).
