= Stanley D. Beck =

American entomologist

Stanley Dwight Beck (October 17, 1919 – July 8, 1997) was an American entomologist who specialized in insect physiology and host plant resistance. He became a university researcher after a stint in the navy during World War II. Paralyzed by polio and reliant on a wheelchair from 1952 he continued his research. He worked on insect photoperiodism and wrote two major books Animal Photoperiodism (1963) and Insect Photoperiodism (1968). Among his contributions was the successful development of artificial diets for lepidopteran larvae which enabled controlled laboratory experimentation and research on several pest species. After his retirement he published Two in the Game, a novel.

== Biography ==
Beck was born in Portland, Oregon but grew up in small towns in Washington state. He became interested in insects at a young age and joined Washington State University after earning money by working in a lumber mill for a year with some seasons spent on an experimental apple orchard. He graduated in 1942 and joined the US Navy in 1942 working aboard a mine-sweeper. After the war, he joined the University of Wisconsin, Madison as a research assistant and worked as an entomology instructor. He had polio in 1952 and his limbs were largely paralyzed and was reliant on a wheelchair. He learned to strike typewriter keyboards with a pencil in his more usable left hand and prepared all his manuscripts and correspondence independently. In 1969 he was made W.A. Henry Distinguished Professor. During his research career, he published nearly 138 papers and some books including The Simplicity of Science (1959), Modern Science and Christian Life (1970), and two books on photoperiodism. Beck's major contribution was the development of an artificial diet for lepidopteran larvae which enabled controlled lab experiments. Beck and Michael Chippendale discovered that larvae could would not grow unless there was microbial contamination of the medium. This led to the identification of key nutritional elements. Beck and James Apple worked on geographical variation and photoperiod effects on voltinism in the European corn borer (Pyrausta nubilalis). He worked on matters of disability and was, in 1974, among the first in the university to connect to the mainframe computer from his own office desk. After learning to program in FORTRAN he worked on modeling growth, development and diapause and developed what he called the dual system theory, an early model to account for the multiple genetic and regulatory pathways involved in photoperiodism. After retiring in 1989 he worked on a novel Two in the Game.

Beck was elected to the National Academy of Sciences in 1988. He also served on committee that examined ethics and disability. Beck received an honorary doctorate in 1972 from Luther College, Decorah and in 1981 Washington State University honored him with a Distinguished Achievement award. Beck was a member of the Bethel Lutheran Church in Madison. He however dismissed creationism, writing in 1982 that "..it has neither scientific nor theological credibility.." and that its survival depended on "..its appeal to the scientifically uninformed and theologically naive, combined with a great deal of fanatic political activity." Beck was married to Isabel Stalker from 1943 and they had a son and three daughters of whom Karen, a Ph.D. in theoretical mathematics working at the University of Utah died before him. He died from post-polio syndrome in Madison, Wisconsin. In 1997, the Entomological Society of America established a Stanley D. Beck Fellowship to aid physically disabled and disadvantaged students.
