= Jan-Philipp Beck =

German politician (born 1990)

Member of the Landtag of Lower Saxony
- Incumbent
- Assumed office 8 November 2022
- Preceded by: Karsten Becker
- Constituency: Schaumburg

Personal details
- Born: 9 March 1990 (age 36) Stadthagen
- Party: Social Democratic Party (since 2006)

Jan-Philipp Beck (born 9 March 1990 in Stadthagen) is a German politician serving as a member of the Landtag of Lower Saxony since 2022. He has served as deputy Landrat of Schaumburg since 2021.
