= Margit Beck =

Hungarian-born painter who lived and worked in the United States

Margit Beck Schwartz (1918–1997) was a Hungarian-born painter who lived and worked in the United States.

She was born Margit Beck in Tokay, Hungary. She studied first at the Institute of Fine Arts in Oradea, Romania and then at the Art Students League of New York.

Her work is included in the Whitney Museum of American Art. Her papers, c.1950–1970, which give her year of birth as 1915, are held by the Smithsonian.
