= Cecilie Beck =

Scandinavian musician and audiovisual artist

Cecilie Beck is a Danish musician and audiovisual artist based in New York City, United States. She began playing the piano, her main instrument, at the age of six. In 2016, she released her debut album, Here is Now, on her own label Sound Vision Lab Inc.

== Education and career ==
In May 2013, Cecilie Beck earned an MFA from the Royal Danish Academy of Fine Arts. At the Academy's department 'School of Walls and Space', Beck studied Art-as-Activism and art in public spaces.

Beck’s music spans across a variety of music genres. She paints and draws her songs in a series called “Songs without Sound”. Other aspects of her practice include installation, performance art, video projections, books, costumes/sculptures, experimental archiving and field work.

Beck has showcased her work at various venues in New York City, such as Nublu, Rockwood Music Hall, The Knitting Factory, Paper Box, Red Door, Arlene's Grocery, Mercury Lounge, The Bitter End, La Bodega Studios, Platos Cave/Eidia House, Lesley Heller Gallery, Pianos and many more. Internationally, she has presented her music at Spikersuppa Sound Gallery in Oslo, The Artist House (Museum) in Oslo, Basso in Berlin, Litteraturhaus in Copenhagen and more. Among other public recognition, she received a "work grant" from the Danish Arts Foundation in 2017. In 2017, she was also put on the Danish ambassador’s "Super Danish" list along with other acclaimed artists and culture contributors abroad.

== Personal life ==
Beck has lived in five different countries - Denmark, Sweden, Germany, Indonesia, the United States. She now lives and works as an artist in New York (since 2012).

== Collaborations ==
- Fran Cathcart (Double Grammy Award winning producer)
- Razors Productions
- DjCherishTheLuv
- Charles Burnham (violinist)
- Jackson Whalan (electronic musician and rapper)
- Prince Harvey (hip hop artist)
- Brandon Ross (guitarist, producer, songwriter, composer)
- Dynasty Electric (band)
- Annika Lundgren (visual artist)
- Nora Stephens (visual artist/dancer)
- Grounded View (dancers)
- Malene Korsgaard Lauritsen Twsai (photographer)
- Mikkel Jørgensen (videographer)
- Rebekka Elisabeth Anker-Møller (curator)
- Ayler Young (song writer)

== Discography ==
2010	Escape and Refuge	Audiovisual project
2013	Portrait NYC	Thesis Project
2014	A Space between Spaces	EP
2016	Here is Now	Debut album
2017	Loss	EP
