= Nepal Astronomical Society =

Community of astronomers

NASO
- Nepal Astronomical Society
- नेपाल एष्ट्रोनोमिकल सोसाईटी
- Formation: 2007 AD to Present
- Founder: Suresh Bhattarai
- Founded at: Kathmandu
- Type: Non-profit
- Legal status: Organisation
- Purpose: Astronomy and Space Science Outreach, Education and Research
- Headquarters: Kathmandu, Nepal
- Location: Kathmandu-23, Bagmati Province, Nepal
- Website: www.nepalastronomicalsociety.org

The Nepal Astronomical Society (NASO) is a Nepali learning community of professional astronomers and other interested individuals headquartered in Kathmandu. Its primary objective is to promote the advancement of astronomy, astrophysics and other closely related branches of science through various outreach and educational activities, while the secondary purpose includes enhancing the research in astronomy and astrophysics and providing a helpful and knowledgeable platform for members through its various activities. Its current mission is to enhance and share the knowledge of astronomy, astrophysics and humanity's scientific understanding of the universe.

The society is creating opportunities for students for the study of astronomy and astrophysics. It has been organizing different programs like All Nepal Asteroid Search Campaign and National Astronomy Olympiad.

Since its beginning, using astronomy to stimulate quality and inspiring education for disadvantaged children has been the essential goal for the Nepal Astronomical Society (NASO). NASO is conducting various awareness activities on its own as well as in collaboration with national and international organizations like Central Department of Physics Tribhuvan University (TU), International Astronomical Union (IAU), Department of Physics Prithvi Narayan Campus Pokhara, Nepal Academy of Science and Technology (NAST), Global Hands-on Universe (GHOU), European Universe Awareness (EU-UNAWE) and Pokhara Astronomical Society (PAS) to disseminate those activities for the school children and teachers in Nepal.

== NASO Day ==
The journey of the Nepal Astronomical Society, which started in 2064 BS (2007 AD), celebrates NASO Day every year.

== See also ==
- Nepal Academy of Science and Technology
- Nepalese Space Research Association
- Women In Astronomy Nepal, 2015 organization
