= Horatio Beck =

American politician (1810–1872)

Member of the Maryland House of Delegates from the Kent County district
- In office 1867–1872 Serving with William Welch, Stephen A. Boyer, William B. Wilmer
- Preceded by: Samuel Comegys and Lewin Usilton
- Succeeded by: James W. Hurtt and William B. Wilmer

Personal details
- Born: March 7, 1810 Kent County, Maryland, U.S.
- Died: June 11, 1874 (aged 64)
- Party: Democratic
- Spouse: Mary Matilda Miller (m. 1835)
- Children: 8
- Relatives: Solomon Scott Beck (grandson); William W. Beck (grandson)
- Occupation: Politician; farmer

Horatio Beck (March 7, 1810 – June 11, 1874) was an American politician from Maryland. He served as a member of the Maryland House of Delegates, representing Kent County from 1867 to 1872.

== Early life ==
Horatio Beck was born on March 7, 1810, at the Beck farm in Kent County, Maryland, to John Beck.

== Career ==
Beck was a Democrat. He served in the Maryland House of Delegates, representing Kent County from 1867 to 1872. He also worked as a farmer.

== Personal life ==
Beck married Mary Matilda Miller of Kent County on April 7, 1835. They had eight children, Samuel, Merritt, Walter Hodges, George, Clarence Benjamin, James Lawrence, Sophia and Thomas H. His son Samuel was a clerk of the circuit court and his grandsons Solomon Scott Beck and William W. Beck were state senators. He was a vestryman of St. Paul's Church in Kent County.

Beck died on June 11, 1874.
