= Carolyn Beck =

American industrial engineer

Carolyn L. Beck is an American industrial and systems engineer whose research interests include network controllability, model order reduction, and the mathematical modelling of infectious diseases and related phenomena. She is a professor of industrial engineering at the University of Illinois Urbana-Champaign.

== Education and career ==
Beck grew up in Pasadena, and studied electrical engineering as an undergraduate at California Polytechnic State University, Pomona, graduating in 1984. Next, she started a four-year stint with Hewlett-Packard in Santa Clara, California, from 1985 to 1989, at the same time earning a master's degree from Carnegie Mellon University in 1986. She returned to Pasadena as a doctoral student at the California Institute of Technology, and completed her Ph.D. in electrical engineering there in 1997.

After postdoctoral research at the Lund Institute of Technology and an assistant professorship at the University of Pittsburgh, she moved to the University of Illinois in 1999, as an assistant professor of general engineering. She moved to the university's Department of Industrial & Enterprise Systems Engineering when it was formed from the merger of two previous departments.

== Recognition ==
Beck was elected as an IEEE Fellow, in the 2023 class of fellows, "for contributions to model reduction and to the analysis of epidemic processes over networks". She is a Distinguished Lecturer of the IEEE Control Systems Society for 2024–2026.
