= Gillen D'Arcy Wood =

- Occupation: Academic
- Spouse: Dr. Nancy E. Castro
- Children: Lucas L. Wood, Clara E. Wood

Academic background
- Education: Monash University; Columbia University (Ph.D)

Academic work
- Institutions: University of Illinois at Urbana–Champaign
- Main interests: poetry, poetics, Romanticism, ecology, anthropocene, music history

Gillen D'Arcy Wood is one of two Robert W. Schaefer Professor of Liberal Arts and Sciences at the University of Illinois Urbana-Champaign and associate director, Institute for Sustainability, Energy, and Environment there. He is originally from Australia, the son of D'Arcy Wood and a grandson of A. Harold Wood. He studied at Monash University in Melbourne and received his PhD from Columbia University in New York City under a Fulbright scholarship and has published extensively on nineteenth-century environmental history, art and literature.

He is the author of The Shock of the Real: Romanticism and Visual Culture, 1760-1860 (Palgrave, 2001), Romanticism and Music Culture in Britain, 1770-1840: Virtue and Virtuosity (Cambridge UP, 2010), an historical novel, Hosack's Folly (Other Press, 2005), the award-winning Tambora: The Eruption That Changed the World (Princeton, NJ: Princeton University Press, 2014), and recently, Land of Wondrous Cold: The Race to Discover Antarctica and Unlock the Secrets of Its Ice (Princeton, NJ: Princeton University Press, 2020).
