= Hans Beck (mathematician) =

German mathematician (1876–1942)

Hans Heinrich Rudolf Beck was a German mathematician.

Hans Beck was born 16 August 1876 in Altzarrendorf, Kreis Grimmon, Province of Pomerania, Prussia. He studied science at University of Griefswald. In 1902 he taught in Ostern, in 1903 in Hannover, and from 1909 to 1917 in Charlottenburg.

He began research with Eduard Study at University of Bonn and produced a dissertation on hyperbolic geometry. He translated Maxime Bôcher's Introduction to Higher Algebra in 1910. In 1917 he took a position at the university. He produced a textbook on coordinate geometry in 1919, and was promoted to professor in 1920. His Introduction to the Axiomatics of Algebra appeared in 1926. He died in Bonn, Germany on 24 October 1942.

He was a member of mathematical societies: German Mathematical Society, Berliner Mathmatischer Gesellschaft, and Circolo Matematico di Palermo.

== Works ==
- 1910: (as translator) Einführung in die höhere Algebra by Maxime Bôcher
- 1910: Ein Seitenstück zur Mobius'schen Geometrie der Kreisverwandschaften, Transactions of the American Mathematical Society 11
- 1919: Koordinatengeometrie, Julius Springer
- 1926: Einfuhrung in die Axiomatik der Algebra
