= Theodric Romeyn Beck =

American physician

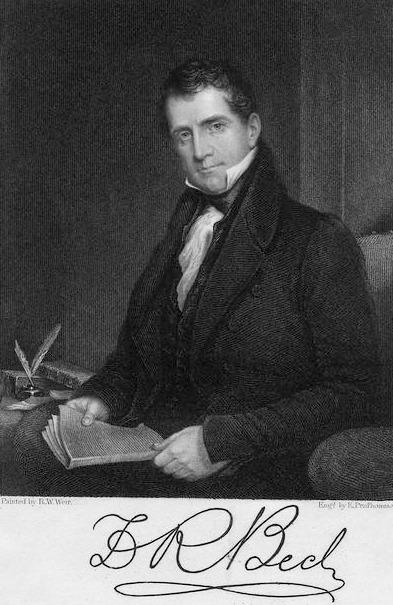
- Born: April 11, 1791; Schenectady, New York, US
- Died: November 19, 1855 (aged 64)
- Occupations: physician and academic

Academic background
- Education: Union College; Columbia University College of Physicians and Surgeons

Academic work
- Discipline: medical jurisprudence
- Institutions: College of Physicians and Surgeons of Western New York; Albany Academy; Albany Medical College
- Notable works: Elements of Medical Jurisprudence

Theodric Romeyn Beck (April 11, 1791 – November 19, 1855), alternatively Theodoric Romeyn Beck or T. Romeyn Beck, was an American medical doctor in Albany, New York, specializing in medical jurisprudence who authored the first significant American book on forensic medicine, Elements of Medical Jurisprudence in 1823.

== Biography ==
Beck was born in Schenectady, New York, to the family of Caleb Beck. He graduated from Union College at the age of 16 and the Columbia University College of Physicians and Surgeons with an M.D. at the age of 20 before going into practice in Albany in 1811. In 1813 he presented to the Albany Society of Arts a comprehensive paper on the mineral resources of the United States. In 1815 he was appointed professor of the institutes of medicine, and lecturer on medical jurisprudence in the College of Physicians and Surgeons of Western New York, at Fairfield. Beck was also elected a member of the American Antiquarian Society in 1815. He served as the principal of the Albany Academy from 1817 to 1848, where he encouraged the future curator of the Smithsonian Institution, Joseph Henry, to enroll as a student and later serve as a professor of mathematics and natural philosophy in 1826. Also during this time, he was a professor of medical jurisprudence at Fairfield Medical College from 1826 until 1836, and professor of materia medica in that institution from 1836 till 1840, and at Albany Medical College from 1840 until 1854. He was elected to the American Philosophical Society in 1839.

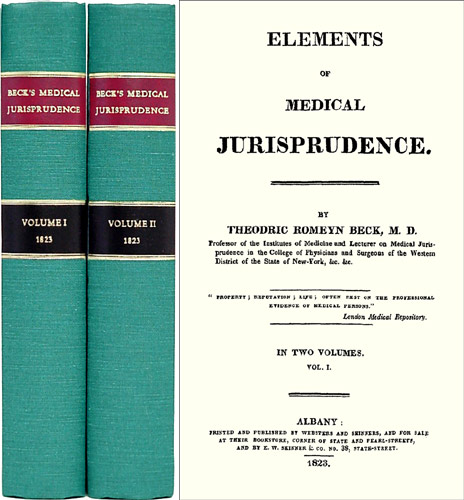
Elements of Medical Jurisprudence

In 1823, while secretary of the Society for the Promotion of Useful Arts (SPUA), he founded the Albany Lyceum of Natural History, which focused on the preservation of mineral and botanical specimens collected in New York state surveys. The following year, SPUA and the Albany Lyceum of Natural History merged to form the Albany Institute; Stephen Van Rensselaer III was appointed its president and Beck was appointed its vice president. He was chosen president of the New York State Medical Society in 1829, and became a manager of the state lunatic asylum before becoming president of the Board of Managers in 1854. During his service, he collected statistics on deaf-mutes, which influenced the legislature to pass laws for the education of the mentally ill. In addition, from 1849 to 1853 he edited the American Journal of Insanity.

His principal work was Elements of Medical Jurisprudence. His brother John Brodhead Beck, also a medical doctor, contributed the material on infanticide. The first edition was printed in 1823, a seventh edition was issued in London in 1842, with notes by Dunlap and Darwell, and a tenth in Albany in 1850.

Beck also contributed to numerous scientific journals. Another of his brothers, Lewis Caleb Beck, wrote book on the Mineralogy of New York (1842). Yet another brother, Nicholas F. Beck, was an attorney and militia officer who served as Adjutant General of New York.

== Selected works ==
- An inaugural dissertation on insanity (1811)
- On the utility of country medical institutions (1825)
- Statistics of the deaf and dumb in the State of New-York, the United States, and in various countries of Europe (1837)
