= Robert Nason Beck =

American scientist

Robert N. Beck

Robert Nason Beck (March 26, 1928, in San Angelo, Texas – August 6, 2008, in Chicago, Illinois) was an American scientist and a pioneer in the field of nuclear medicine. Part of a University of Chicago team, he was the first to propose, in 1961, the use of the radioisotope technetium-99m to detect disease using Single Photon Emission Computed Tomography, a technique that is used an estimated 20 million times a year throughout the world. Beck also helped develop collimators for sharpening the images produced by gamma-ray scanners, and was referred to as 'Mr. Collimator' by colleagues.

== Career ==
Beck attended Angelo State University for a year before joining the United States Navy in 1946, where he worked as an electronics technician. Upon his discharge, Beck enrolled at the University of Chicago, where he earned a B.A. in 1954 and a B.S. in mathematics in 1955.

Beck was appointed chief scientist and director of Argonne Cancer Research Hospital (ACRH) in 1957. In 1977, he was named director of ACRH's successor, Franklin McLean Memorial Research Institute. In 1986, he founded and directed the Center for Imaging Science shared between the University of Chicago and Argonne National Laboratory.

Beck also served as a professor of radiology at the University of Chicago until his retirement in 1998. During his life, Beck published nearly 250 scientific papers and served on several task forces, in the field, especially for the Society of Nuclear Medicine and the International Atomic Energy Agency.

== Personal life ==
Beck's father Otto Beck was a Texas German. The family had a long history in San Angelo and Fredericksburg. He had two sisters, Mary Ann and Dorothy.

Beck's mother was a member of the Comanche tribe, accounting for Beck's long-term interest in American Indian matters: he was, for example, one of the earliest members of the National Museum of the American Indian. Robert Beck married Ariadne Plumis in 1958, and they celebrated their 50th anniversary shortly before his death.

He died after a several-year battle with myelodysplastic syndrome, a form of leukemia.
