= Solomon Scott Beck =

American politician (1883–1944)

Member of the Maryland Senate from the Kent County district
- In office 1927–1933
- Preceded by: William B. Copper
- Succeeded by: Arthur H. Brice

Personal details
- Born: February 13, 1883 Kent County, Maryland, U.S.
- Died: March 13, 1944 (aged 61) Chestertown, Maryland, U.S.
- Resting place: Old St. Paul's Cemetery; Chestertown, Maryland, U.S.
- Party: Democratic
- Spouse: Emma Mackey Perry (m. 1909)
- Children: 2
- Relatives: Horatio Beck (grandfather)
- Education: Washington College; University of Maryland School of Law (LLB)
- Occupation: Politician; lawyer

Solomon Scott Beck (February 13, 1883 – March 13, 1944) was an American politician from Maryland. He served as a member of the Maryland Senate from 1927 to 1933.

== Early life ==
Solomon Scott Beck was born on February 13, 1883, in "High Park", Kent County, Maryland, to Kate Rose (née Harris) and George Beck. His grandfather was state delegate Horatio Beck. He attended public schools in Kent County and graduated from Washington College in 1903. He graduated from the University of Maryland School of Law with a Bachelor of Laws in 1906.

== Career ==
In 1907, Beck opened a law office in Chestertown. His son Solomon Scott Jr. also served in his law practice. He served as president of the Chestertown Bank of Maryland. He served as president of the Kent Defense Corporation.

Beck was a Democrat. He was a delegate to the 1932 and 1936 Democratic National Conventions. In 1919, he was elected state's attorney of Kent County and served from 1920 to 1926. He served as a member of the Maryland Senate from 1927 to 1933. In September 1933, he was appointed as comptroller of the Port of Baltimore. He served in that role until 1938 when the office was abolished by the U.S. Congress.

Beck was secretary and member of the board of visitors and governors of Washington College.

== Personal life ==
Beck married Emma Mackey Perry, daughter of John M. Perry, of Centreville, Maryland, on December 8, 1909. They had a son and daughter, Solomon Scott Jr. and Elizabeth Mackey.

Beck had a stroke in 1937. He died from pneumonia on March 13, 1944, at Kent and Queen Anne's Hospital in Chestertown. He was buried in Old St. Paul's Cemetery in Chestertown.

== Awards ==
Washington College awarded Beck with an honorary Doctor of Laws degree in 1940.
