= Marcus Actorius Naso =

Ancient Roman biographer

Marcus Actorius Naso (fl. 1st century BCE) seems to have written a life of Julius Caesar, or a history of his times, which is quoted by Suetonius.

Although there is very little evidence to go on, it seems probable he was anti-Caesar in tone.

The time at which he lived is uncertain, but from the way in which he is referred to by Suetonius, he would almost seem to have been a contemporary of Caesar.
