= Lewis Caleb Beck =

United States naturalist (1798-1853)

- Born: October 4, 1798; Schenectady, New York, U.S.
- Died: April 20, 1853 (aged 54); Albany, New York, U.S.
- Education: Union College
- Scientific career
- Fields: Botany
- Workplaces: Rensselaer Polytechnic Institute; Rutgers University

Lewis Caleb Beck (4 October 1798 Schenectady – 20 April 1853 Albany, New York) was an American medical doctor, botanist, chemist, and mineralogist. The standard author abbreviation L.C.Beck is used to indicate this person as the author when citing a botanical name.

== Biography ==
He graduated from Union College in 1815 with a Master of Arts. He then studied medicine, and began his practice in Schenectady in 1818. From 1820 to 1821, he resided in St. Louis, but soon returned and settled in Albany. Beck was successively professor of botany in the Rensselaer Polytechnic Institute (1824–1829), professor of botany and chemistry in the Vermont Academy of Medicine (1826–1832), professor of chemistry and natural history at Rutgers College (1830–1837 and 1838–1853), and professor of chemistry and pharmacy at Albany Medical College (1841–1853). He also delivered a course of chemistry lectures at Middlebury College in 1827.

Beck was the author of a number of books and papers on botany and chemistry, and also of an elaborate report on the mineralogy of New York, based upon his researches as mineralogist (appointed 1836) of the New York Geological Survey of 1835–1841, which was published as one of the volumes of the Natural History of the State of New York (1842). This latter work was probably his most important contribution to scientific literature. Other works included A Gazetteer of Illinois and Missouri (1823), An Account of the Salt Springs at Salina (1826), A Manual of Chemistry (1831), On Adulterations (New York, 1846), and Botany of the United States North of Virginia (1848).

== Family ==
His brother Theodric Romeyn Beck authored the first significant American book on forensic medicine, to which another brother, John Brodhead Beck, also contributed.
