= List of burials at Green-Wood Cemetery =

People buried in Brooklyn, New York City

Green-Wood Cemetery is a 478-acre (193 ha) cemetery in Brooklyn, New York, United States. The cemetery lies several blocks southwest of Prospect Park, and is generally bounded by 20th Street to the northeast, Fifth Avenue to the northwest, 36th and 37th Streets to the southwest, Fort Hamilton Parkway to the south, and McDonald Avenue to the east. Green-Wood Cemetery was founded in 1838 as a rural cemetery.

== A ==
- Gustav Elijah Åhr (1996–2017), American rapper
- Samuel Akerly (1785–1845), co-founder of the New York Institute for the Blind
- Augustus Chapman Allen (1806–1864), co-founder of the City of Houston
- Harvey A. Allen (1818?–1882), United States Army officer, was Commander of the Department of Alaska 1871–1873
- Albert Anastasia (1903–1957), mobster and contract killer for Murder, Inc.
- Othniel Boaz Askew (1972–2003; cremated), politician and assassin of New York City Council member James E. Davis, whose remains were relocated to another cemetery

== B ==
- Walter W. Bahan (1860–1916), lawyer and member New York State Assembly
- James Bard (1815–1897), marine artist, buried in unmarked grave
- Peter Townsend Barlow (1857–1921), New York City Magistrate
- Susie M. Barstow (1836–1923), landscape painter associated with the Hudson River School
- Jean-Michel Basquiat (1960–1988), artist
- William Holbrook Beard (1824–1900), painter of Bulls and Bears representing the market cycle; a bear statue sits on top of his headstone
- Henry Ward Beecher (1813–1887), abolitionist
- Augustus Belknap (1841–1889), Union Army officer and railway executive
- George Wesley Bellows (1882–1925), painter
- James Gordon Bennett, Sr. (1795–1872), founder/publisher of the New York Herald
- Richard Rodney Bennett (1936–2012; cremated), composer of film, TV and concert music
- Henry Bergh (1818–1888), founder of the American Society for the Prevention of Cruelty to Animals
- Leonard Bernstein (1918–1990), pianist, composer, and conductor; alongside his wife, actress Felicia Montealegre (1922–1978)
- Sid Bernstein (1918–2013), American music promoter
- Jane Augusta Blankman (1823–1860), courtesan
- Samuel Blatchford (1820–1893), U.S. Supreme Court Justice
- Stanley Bosworth (1927–2011), founding headmaster of prestigious Saint Ann's School
- William Oland Bourne (1819–1901), American clergyman, journalist, social reformer
- William R. Brewster (1828–1869), Civil War Union Brevet Brigadier General
- Andrew Bryson (1822–1892), United States Navy rear admiral

== C ==
- Charlotte Canda (1828–1845), a debutante killed in a carriage accident on her 17th birthday
- Duncan Candler (1873–1949), architect
- Elliott Carter (1908–2012), composer
- Alice Cary (1820–1871), poet, author
- Phoebe Cary (1824–1871), poet, author
- George Catlin (1796–1872), painter of Native Americans in the Old West
- Henry Chadwick (1824–1908), Baseball Hall of Fame member (memorial)
- William Merritt Chase (1849–1916), painter, teacher
- Kate Claxton (1850–1924), American theatre actress noted for her role of Louise in the play The Two Orphans
- DeWitt Clinton (1769–1828), unsuccessful U.S. presidential candidate 1812; U.S. Senator from New York; seventh and ninth Governor of New York
- Henry Ives Cobb Jr., (1883–1974), artist and architect
- William Colgate, (1783–1853), English-American soap industrialist who founded in 1806 what became the Colgate-Palmolive company.
- Barry Commoner (1917–2012), American environmentalist, professor and presidential candidate
- Abraham Bogart Conger (1814–1887), lawyer, farmer, and politician
- William J. Coombs (1833–1922), U.S. Congressman from Brooklyn
- George H. Cooper (1821–1891), United States Navy rear admiral
- Peter Cooper (1791–1883), inventor, manufacturer, abolitionist, founder of Cooper Union
- James Creighton, Jr. (1841–1862), first pitcher to throw a fastball
- Edwin Pearce Christy (1815–1862), minstrel, known for performing the Stephen Foster song "Old Folks at Home" (aka "Swanee River")
- Bruce Crane (1857–1937), painter
- Thomas T. Craven (1873–1950), United States Navy vice admiral
- L. Adele Cuinet (1854/55–1933), dental surgeon
- George Washington Cullum (1809–1892), Superintendent of the United States Military Academy
- Nathaniel Currier (1813–1888), artist ("Currier and Ives")
- Duncan Curry (1812–1894), baseball pioneer and insurance executive
- Elizabeth Cushier (1837–1931), professor of medicine and for 25 years before her retirement in 1900, one of New York's most prominent obstetricians
- Bronson M. Cutting (1888–1935), United States Senator from New Mexico (1927–1928; 1929–1935)

== D ==
- Marcus Daly (1841–1900), Irish-born copper industrialist in Montana
- James E. Davis (1962–2003), assassinated City Councilman, was buried here for a few days; upon learning his killer's ashes were also in Green-Wood, his family had his body exhumed and reinterred in the Cemetery of the Evergreens
- Charles W. Dayton (1846–1910), postmaster of New York City, state assemblyman, New York Supreme Court justice
- Charles Schuyler De Bost (1826–1895), baseball pioneer
- Joseph Delafield (1790–1875), militia officer, diplomat and lawyer
- Julia Livingston Delafield (1801–1882), society hostess
- Richard Delafield (1798–1873), Chief of Engineers and Superintendent of West Point
- Do-Hum-Me (c. 1825–1843), daughter of a chief of the Sauk people, performer at Barnum's American Museum
- Francis E. Dorn (1911–1987), U.S. Naval Commander, attorney and member of the U.S. House of Representatives from New York's 12th congressional district
- Mabel Smith Douglass (1874–1933), founder and first dean of the New Jersey College for Women
- Dorothy Catherine Draper (1807–1901), chemist and educator
- Dorothea A. Dreier (1870–1923), painter
- Katherine Sophie Dreier (1877–1952), artist and social reformer
- Raoul Pène Du Bois (1914–1985), American costume designer
- Thomas Clark Durant (1820–1885), key figure in building the First transcontinental railroad
- William West Durant (1850–1934), son of Thomas Clark Durant and designer and developer of camps in the Adirondack Great Camp style
- James Durno (1795–1873), husband of labor activist Sarah Bagley (1806–1883)

== E ==
- Fred Ebb (1928–2004), lyricist
- Charles Ebbets (1859–1925), baseball team (Brooklyn Dodgers) owner; built Ebbets Field
- Elizabeth F. Ellet (1818–1877), American writer and poet
- Georgia Engelhard (1906–1985), mountaineer in the Canadian Rockies and the Selkirk ranges. Niece of Alfred Stieglitz and his wife, Georgia O'Keeffe.
- Philip Evergood (1901–1973), was an American painter, etcher, lithographer, sculptor, illustrator and writer
- George Edwin Ewing (1828–1884), Scottish sculptor

== F ==
- Charles Feltman (1841–1910), claimed to be the first person to put a hot dog on a bun
- Edward Ferrero (1831–1899), American Civil War General at the Battle of the Crater and in the Appomattox Campaign
- Eunice Newton Foote (1819–1888), was an American scientist, physicist, inventor, and women's rights campaigner from Seneca Falls, New York. Her experiments on the warming effect of sunlight on different gases were overlooked until the 21st century
- Edwin Forbes (1839–1895), American Civil War and postbellum artist, illustrator, and etcher
- Lockwood de Forest (1850–1932), American painter, interior designer, and furniture designer
- Leah Fox (1813–1890), spiritualist
- James Hillhouse Fuertes (1863–1932), civil and sanitary engineer
- Isaac Kaufmann Funk (1839–1912), American editor, lexicographer, publisher, and spelling reformer

== G ==
- Joey Gallo (1929–1972), mobster
- Charles M. Gage (1848–1919), cofounder of Gage & Tollner restaurant
- William Delbert Gann (1878–1955), Stock Market author and visionary
- Mary Gannon ("Mrs George Stevenson"; 1829–1868), American stage actress and comedienne
- Asa Bird Gardiner (1839–1919), controversial soldier, attorney, and prosecutor
- Robert Selden Garnett (1819–1861), brigadier general of the Confederate States Army and the first general killed in the American Civil War
- Henry George (1839–1897), writer, politician and economist
- Henry George, Jr. (1862–1916), United States Representative from New York
- Jasper W. Gilbert (1818–1899), justice on the New York Supreme Court
- Louis Moreau Gottschalk (1829–1869), composer
- John Franklin Gray (1804–1882), the first practitioner of Homeopathy in the United States
- Horace Greeley (1811–1872), unsuccessful U.S. presidential candidate 1872; founder of the New York Tribune
- Robert Stockton Green (1831–1895), Governor of New Jersey
- Dudley Sanford Gregory (1800–1874), first mayor of Jersey City, U.S. House of Representatives (1847–1849)
- Friedrich Gretsch (1856–1895), businessman and founder of Gretsch
- Rufus Wilmot Griswold (1815–1857), literary critic

== H ==
- Ann Hall (1792–1863), painter and popular 19th-century miniaturist
- Edward Wheeler Hall (1881–1922), one of the victims of the Hall–Mills murder case
- Frances Noel Stevens Hall (1874–1942), wife of Edward and suspect in the Hall–Mills murder
- Paul Hall (1914–1980), labor leader
- Henry Wager Halleck (1815–1872), U.S. Army Commander during the middle part of the American Civil War
- William Stewart Halsted (1852–1922), pioneer in American medicine and surgery, often credited as the "Father of Modern American Surgery"
- Jeremiah Hamilton (1806/1807–1875), "the only black millionaire in New York" around the time of the American Civil War
- William John Hammond (1797–1848), British actor-manager and comedian
- John Hardy (1835–1913), member of the U.S. House of Representatives from New York
- Townsend Harris (1804–1878), first U.S. Consul General to Japan
- Nathaniel H. Harris (1834–1900), Confederate brigadier general during the American Civil War
- William S. Hart (1864–1946), star of silent "Western" movies
- John A. Hartwell (1861–1940), noted athlete, philanthropist, pioneer in American surgery, and personal physician of Theodore Roosevelt
- Thomas Hastings (1784–1872), wrote the music to the hymn "Rock of Ages"
- Genevieve Hecker (1883–1960), champion golfer
- Joseph Henderson (1826–1890), notable harbor pilot
- Philip A. Herfort (1851–1921), violinist and orchestra leader
- Emery S. Hetrick (1931–1987), American psychiatrist and one of the founders of the Hetrick-Martin Institute
- Abram S. Hewitt (1822–1903), Teacher, lawyer, iron manufacturer, U.S. Congressman, and a mayor of New York; son-in-law of Peter Cooper
- Henry B. Hidden (c. 1839–1862), American Civil War cavalry officer
- Grace Webster Haddock Hinsdale (1832–1902), author
- DeWolf Hopper (1858–1935), actor
- Charles Horman (1942–1973), journalist, murdered in Chile by the regime of Augusto Pinochet, subject of the film Missing
- Elizabeth Horman (1904–2001), artist
- Elias Howe (1819–1867), invented the sewing machine (see Walter Hunt)
- James Howell (1829–1897), 19th mayor of Brooklyn
- Walter Hunt (1785–1869), invented the safety pin

== I ==
- Angelo Ippolito (1922–2001), color field painter
- Richard Isay (1934–2012), psychiatrist, psychoanalyst, author, gay activist
- James Merritt Ives (1824–1895), artist ("Currier and Ives")

== J ==
- Paul Jabara (1948–1992), actor, singer and songwriter
- Abraham Jacobi (1830–1919), the Father of American Pediatrics
- Leonard Jerome (1817–1891), entrepreneur, grandfather of Winston Churchill
- Morris Ketchum Jesup (1830–1908), founder of YMCA New York and president of the American Museum of Natural History
- Eastman Johnson (1824–1906), American painter, and co-founder of the Metropolitan Museum of Art, New York City
- James Weldon Johnson (1871–1938), American author, educator, lawyer, diplomat, songwriter, and civil rights activist. Author of "Lift Every Voice and Sing" with his wife Grace Nail Johnson
- Tom L. Johnson (1854–1911), former mayor of Cleveland, Ohio
- Sharon Jones (1956–2016), lead singer of the soul and funk band Sharon Jones and the Dap-Kings
- Willard F. Jones (1890–1967), naval architect, head of National Safety Council's marine section and Vice President of Gulf Oil
- Bashar Barakah Jackson (Pop Smoke) (1999–2020), rapper

== K ==
- Esther Augusta Howard King (1845–1925), clubwoman
- Florence Brevoort Kane (1895–1956), deaf sculptor
- Laura Keene (1826–1873), actress who was on stage when Lincoln was shot
- Włodzimierz Krzyżanowski (1824–1887), Polish American engineer, politician, and brigadier general in the Union Army. On 13 October 1937, the 50th anniversary of his death, his remains were transferred with military honors to Arlington National Cemetery.
- Tuli Kupferberg (1923–2010), musician and poet; co-founder of The Fugs
- Charles J. Kurth (1862–1896), lawyer and politician

== L ==
- Florence La Badie (1888–1917), actress
- John La Farge (1835–1910), artist
- Harriet Burton Laidlaw (1873–1949), suffragette
- Laura Jean Libbey (1862–1924), popular "dime-store" novelist
- Brockholst Livingston (1757–1823), U.S. Supreme Court Justice
- William Livingston (1723–1790), signer of the U.S. Constitution; first Governor of New Jersey
- Frederick W. Loew (1834–1909), lawyer and judge
- Pierre Lorillard IV (1833–1901), tobacco tycoon, introduced the tuxedo to the U.S.
- Seth Low (1850–1916), politician, mayor of New York City (1902–1903)
- Wauhope Lynn (1856–1920), lawyer, judge, and politician

== M ==
- John W. Mackay (1831–1902), millionaire, one of the Bonanza Kings of Virginia City, NV and the Comstock Lode
- A. Damien Martin (1933–1991), life partner to Emery Hetrick, co-founder of the Hetrick-Martin Institute, psychiatrist, professor at NYU School of Education, and LGBT History Month Icon
- Alfred Henry Maurer (1868–1932), modernist painter
- James Maury (1746–1840), first U.S. consul to Liverpool, England
- Thomas H. McGrath (1840–1922), Adjutant General of New York
- Ormsby M. Mitchel (1805–1862), American astronomer and major general in the American Civil War
- Henry James Montague (1840–1878), stage actor
- Lola Montez (1821–1861), actress and mistress of many notable men among them King Ludwig I of Bavaria
- Charles Morgan (1795–1878), shipping magnate
- Frank Morgan (1890–1949), actor (The Wizard of Oz)
- Samuel F. B. Morse (1791–1872), invented Morse code, language of the telegraph
- Nicholas Muller (1836–1917), U.S. Congressman

== N ==
- William Niblo (1790–1878), also known as Billy Niblo, the owner of Niblo's Garden

== O ==
- Violet Oakley (1874–1961), artist
- Laughton Osborn (1809–1878), poet, novelist, and playwright

== P ==
- James Kirke Paulding (1779–1860), U.S. Secretary of the Navy under Martin Van Buren
- Mary Ellis Peltz (1896–1981), American drama and music critic, magazine editor, poet and writer on music
- Carmine Persico, (1933–2019), American mobster
- Anson Greene Phelps (1781–1853), founder of Phelps, Dodge mining and copper company
- Duncan Phyfe (1770–1854), cabinetmaker
- Hezekiah Pierrepont (1768–1838) merchant and founder of Brooklyn Heights, Brooklyn
- Arthur Tappan Pierson (1837–1911), an American Presbyterian pastor, Christian leader, missionary and writer
- Benjamin Pike Jr. (1809–1864), American optician and scientific instrument maker
- Walter Plimmer Jr. (1900–1968), an American actor and priest.
- Walter Plimmer Sr. (1869–1944), an English theatrical producer
- William "Bill The Butcher" Poole (1821–1855), a member of the Bowery Boys gang and the Know Nothing political party; also a bare-knuckle boxer 40.651602°N 73.995498°W

== R ==
- Henry Jarvis Raymond (1820–1869), American journalist and politician and founder of The New York Times
- Ada Rehan (1857–1916), American stage actor
- Samuel C. Reid (1783–1861), suggested the design upon which all U.S. flags since 1818 have been based
- John Roach (1815–1887), founder of shipbuilding company Roach & Sons
- Alice Roosevelt (1861–1884), first wife of U.S. President Theodore Roosevelt
- Martha Bulloch Roosevelt (1834–1884), mother of U.S. President Theodore Roosevelt
- Robert Roosevelt (1829–1906), uncle of U.S. President Theodore Roosevelt
- Theodore Roosevelt, Sr. (1831–1878), father of U.S. President Theodore Roosevelt
- Henry Rutgers (1745–1830), Revolutionary War hero, philanthropist, namesake of Rutgers University

== S ==
- George Nicholas Sanders (1812–1873), Union sympathizer with the Confederacy, said to have planned the assassination of Abraham Lincoln
- William Cary Sanger (1853–1921), United States Assistant Secretary of War from 1901 to 1903
- Ira Sankey (1840–1908), hymn composer
- Frederick August Otto Schwarz (1836–1911), founder of specialty toy retailer FAO Schwarz
- Peter Sharpe (1777–1842), American politician, served as a United States representative from New York
- Eli Siegel (1902–1978), poet, educator, founder of the philosophy Aesthetic Realism
- J. Marion Sims (1813–1883), physician called "founder of modern gynecology".
- Ole Singstad (1882–1969), Norwegian-American civil engineer, designed Lincoln Tunnel and others
- John D. Sloat (1781–1867), United States Navy commodore, claimed California for the U.S.
- Henry Warner Slocum (1827–1894), Union general in the American Civil War, U.S. Representative from New York
- George Soper, sanitation engineer and epidemiologist
- Francis Barretto Spinola (1821–1891), first Italian-American elected to the U.S. House of Representatives
- Emma Stebbins (1815–1882), artist, sculptor of Bethesda Fountain
- George Steers (1819–1856), designer of the Yacht America, winner of the first America's Cup.
- Henry Steinway (1797–1871), founder of Steinway & Sons, piano manufacturers
- William Steinway (1836–1896), son of Henry Steinway, and founder of Steinway, New York
- John Austin Stevens Jr. (1827–1910), founder of Sons of the Revolution
- Susan McKinney Steward (1847–1918), one of the first black women to earn a medical degree, and the first in the state of New York
- Lynne Stewart (1939–2017), civil rights lawyer
- Clara Harrison Stranahan (1831–1905), author; founder and trustee of Barnard College
- James S. T. Stranahan (1808–1898), "Father of Prospect Park", instrumental promoter of the park, the Brooklyn Bridge, and the consolidation of Brooklyn into Greater New York
- Francis Scott Street (1831–1883), co-owner of Street & Smith publishers
- Silas Stringham (1798–1876), long-serving United States Navy officer during the American Civil War and War of 1812
- George Crockett Strong (1832–1863), Union brigadier general in the American Civil War
- Thomas William "Fightin' Tom" Sweeny (1820–1892), Irish immigrant and American Civil War general

== T ==
- John Thomas (1805–1871), founder of The Christadelphians
- Louis Comfort Tiffany (1848–1933), artist
- Eugene Tollner (1849–1935), cofounder of Gage & Tollner restaurant
- Matilda Tone (or Mathilda) (1769–1849), widow of Irish rebel Wolfe Tone
- Johnny Torrio (1882–1957), mobster
- Robert H. Torsney (1935–2009), New York City Police Department officer who was acquitted of murdering Randolph Evans in 1976.
- George Francis Train (1829–1904), railroad promoter
- Juan Trippe (1899–1981), airline pioneer, headed Pan Am from 1927 to 1968
- Robert Troup (1756–1832), Revolutionary War hero, New York State assemblyman and Judge; body moved to Green-Wood in 1872
- William Magear "Boss" Tweed (1823–1878), notorious New York political boss, member of the U.S. House of Representatives and New York State Senate

== U ==
- Camilla Urso (1842–1902), French violinist
- Doğan Uluç (1935–2022), Turkish-American journalist

== V ==
- Steven C. Vincent (1955–2005), American journalist and author kidnapped and murdered in Iraq in August 2005
- Ned Vizzini (1981–2013), American author
- Leopold von Gilsa (1824–1870), American Civil War colonel and brigade commander

== W ==
- Charles S. Wainwright (1826–1907), American Civil War colonel and artillery officer
- Henry John Whitehouse (1803–1874), Episcopal bishop
- Thomas R. Whitney (1807–1858), member of the U.S. House of Representatives from New York
- Barney Williams (1824–1876), Irish-American actor-comedian
- Amelia Kempshall Wing (1837–1927), author and philanthropist
- Beekman Winthrop (1874–1940), governor of Puerto Rico from 1904 to 1907, and later an Assistant Secretary of the Treasury
- John B. Woodward (1835–1899), Adjutant General of New York
- Frank Worthing (1866–1910), actor

== Y ==
- Jonathan Young (1826–1885), United States Navy commodore
