= Brandreth (disambiguation) =

Brandreth may refer to:

- Brandreth, a fell in the English Lake District
- Brandreth (archaic), a 3 or 4 legged stand designed to hold a cauldron over an open flame
- Brandreth (surname)
- Brandreth Park, a 26,000-acre (11,000 ha) private preserve in the Adirondacks established in 1851 by Dr. Benjamin Brandreth
- Brandreth Pill Factory, a historic industrial complex located on Water Street in Ossining, New York, United States
