= David Hunter McAlpin =

American industrialist and real estate owner

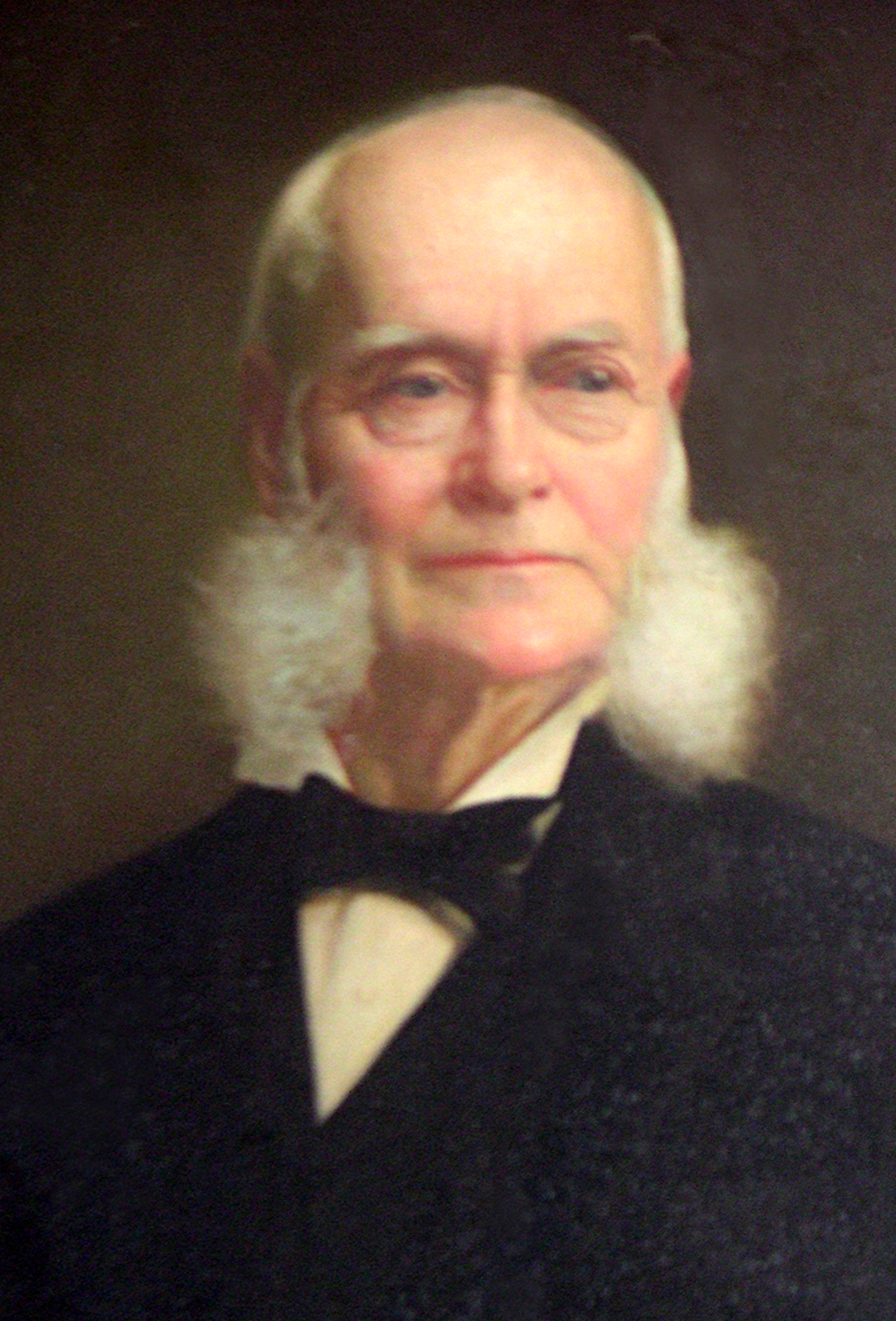
- David Hunter McAlpin portrait (oil on canvas) circa 1890
- Born: November 8, 1816; Pleasant Valley, Dutchess County, New York, US
- Died: February 8, 1901 (aged 84); New York City, US
- Employer(s): D.H. McAlpin & Co
- Known for: Owner and CEO of D.H. McAlpin & Co a large tobacco manufacturer in New York City
- Title: Proprietor
- Board member of: D.H. McAlpin & Co; Eleventh Ward Bank; German-American Real Estate Title and Guarantee Co; Home Insurance Company; Manhattan Life Insurance Co; National Bank of the Republic; Standard Gas Light Co; Union Trust Co
- Spouses: Adelaide Rose McAlpin; Mrs A.D. Chamberlain
- Children: 10

David Hunter McAlpin (1816–1901) was a prominent industrialist and real estate owner in New York City. He owned the D.H. McAlpin Tobacco Company. Among his children were a Civil War General and a prominent physician.

== Early life ==
David Hunter McAlpin was born on November 8, 1816, in Pleasant Valley, New York to James and Jane Hunter McAlpin. His father had immigrated from Ireland in 1811, only five years before his birth after participating in the Irish Rebellion of 1798. In 1836 McAlpin moved to New York City where he opened a tobacco store at 84 Catherine Street in partnership with William H. Hughes. Over the next few years they opened additional stores in the city and the partnership dissolved in 1839 after which McAlpin continued the business alone.

== D.H. McAlpin & Co. Tobacco Company ==
In 1857 McAlpin became a partner in the firm of John Cornish & Co., tobacco manufacturers. In 1860 he bought out his partner upon his retirement taking sole control of the company and renamed it D.H. McAlpin & Co. His company was the first to introduce Virginia tobacco to the New York market branding it Virgin Leaf which contributed to the firm's growth. In 1868 as the firm grew, McAlpin bought two entire blocks and built a large manufacturing facility at 150 Ave D (and 10th street) in Manhattan. After McAlpin's death, the D.H. McAlpin & Co was sold on November 23, 1901, to Consolidated Tobacco Co. for a reported price of $2,500,000.

== Directorships ==
At the time of his death, McAlpin was a director of:

- D.H. McAlpin & Co
- Eleventh Ward Bank
- German-American Real Estate Title and Guarantee Co
- Home Insurance Company
- Manhattan Life Insurance Company
- National Bank of the Republic
- Standard Gas Light Company
- Union Trust Co

== Union Theological Seminary ==
McAlpin sat on the board of the Union Theological Seminary in New York City from 1872 to his death in 1901, and provided generously for the provision of the Seminary. He endowed a chair in theology, known as the "Skinner and McAlpin" Chair, with $25,000, along with an additional $55,000 from others. In 1884 he donated a multi-thousand volume collection of British history and theology to the seminary's library known as the "McAlpin Collection"

McAlpin erected a church, the Olivet Chapel, on Second Street, Manhattan in memory of his son, Joseph Rose McAlpin.

== Marriage ==
McAlpin was married three times. His first wife was Adelaide Rose, daughter of Joseph Rose Jr., whom he married in 1846. The ceremony was held at the Market Street Church, which eventually became the Church of Sea and Land. Adelaide died in 1870. His second wife was Mrs A.D. Chamberlain (Adelia) whom he married in 1873 and who died in 1891. McAlpin's third wife, whom he married in 1892, was Adelaide's sister, Cordelia (Rose) Shackelton, widow of Dr. Judson G. Shackelton.

== Real estate interests ==
McAlpin accumulated several pieces of real estate in Manhattan and the surrounding area. According to The New York Times, he owned the "block on the east side of Broadway between 33rd and 34th streets, and on the southern end of the Alpine apartment house which got its title from the family name. This title retained the final "e" of the family name, which Mr. McAlpin had for many years omitted. It was on this parcel of land that McAlpin's son, General Edwin A. McAlpin built the world's largest hotel known as the Hotel McAlpin in 1912.

In 1848, McAlpin purchased 60 acres (24 ha) in Monmouth County, New Jersey, in what would become the Cliffwood section of Aberdeen Township. This is indicated as his residence in several real estate transactions during the early to mid 1850s. On January 26, 1855, he sold, for $50.00, 0.5 acres (0.20 ha) of land to the Trustees of the Matavan School District No. 1. for school purposes. This remains a part of the campus of the Cliffwood Elementary School. After 1855 it would appear that he returned to New York City, as that is recorded as his residence in subsequent real estate sales.

Additionally, he owned 1,500 acres (6.1 km^{2}) of land with a summer home at Morristown, New Jersey, which he called Glen Alpine, where he spent time in the summer. He owned additional property in Morristown itself, including a parcel at the corner of Speedwell Ave and Park Place, and properties known as the Postoffice Block and the United States Hotel.

== Death ==
McAlpin died at 4:00 pm on February 8, 1901, at his home at 40 West 48th Street in Manhattan of stroke. He had spent the day at the company's manufacturing facility followed by a board meeting of the Eleventh Ward Bank, of which he was a director. His son, General Edwin Augustus McAlpin detected that he was feeling ill and moved him to his home where he was attend by another son, Dr. David Hunter McAlpin. Unable to restore McAlpin to consciousness, the family was called and was at his bedside at the time of his death. Funeral services were held at Brick Presbyterian Church in New York and he was interred in Greenwood Cemetery.

== Children ==
McAlpin had ten children, all by his first wife Adelaide, six of whom survived him:

- General Edward Augustus McAlpin, later Adjutant General of New York
- Dr. David Hunter McAlpin, Princeton graduate and noted physician, who married Emma Rockefeller, daughter of William Rockefeller Jr.
- George L McAlpin, graduate of Yale
- Charles W McAlpin, graduated of Princeton
- William W McAlpin
- Frances Adelaide McAlpin who married James Tolman Pyle

Additionally he had two step-daughters:

- Frances Knox
- Adelaide McAlpin Stiles
