= Brandreth (surname) =

Brandreth is a surname. Notable people with the surname include:

- Aphra Brandreth (born 1978), British politician
- Benjamin Brandreth (1809–1880), New York politician and patent medicine manufacturer
- Courtenay Brandreth (1891–1947), wildlife artist from New York
- George A. Brandreth (1828–1897), New York politician and patent medicine manufacturer
- Gyles Brandreth (born 1948), British actor, broadcaster and writer
- Jeremiah Brandreth (1790–1817), English activist hanged for treason
- Thomas Shaw Brandreth (1788–1873), inventor and classical scholar
- Thomas Brandreth (1825–1894), Royal Navy admiral and Lord of the Admiralty
