= Dale Cemetery =

Historic cemetery in New York, United States

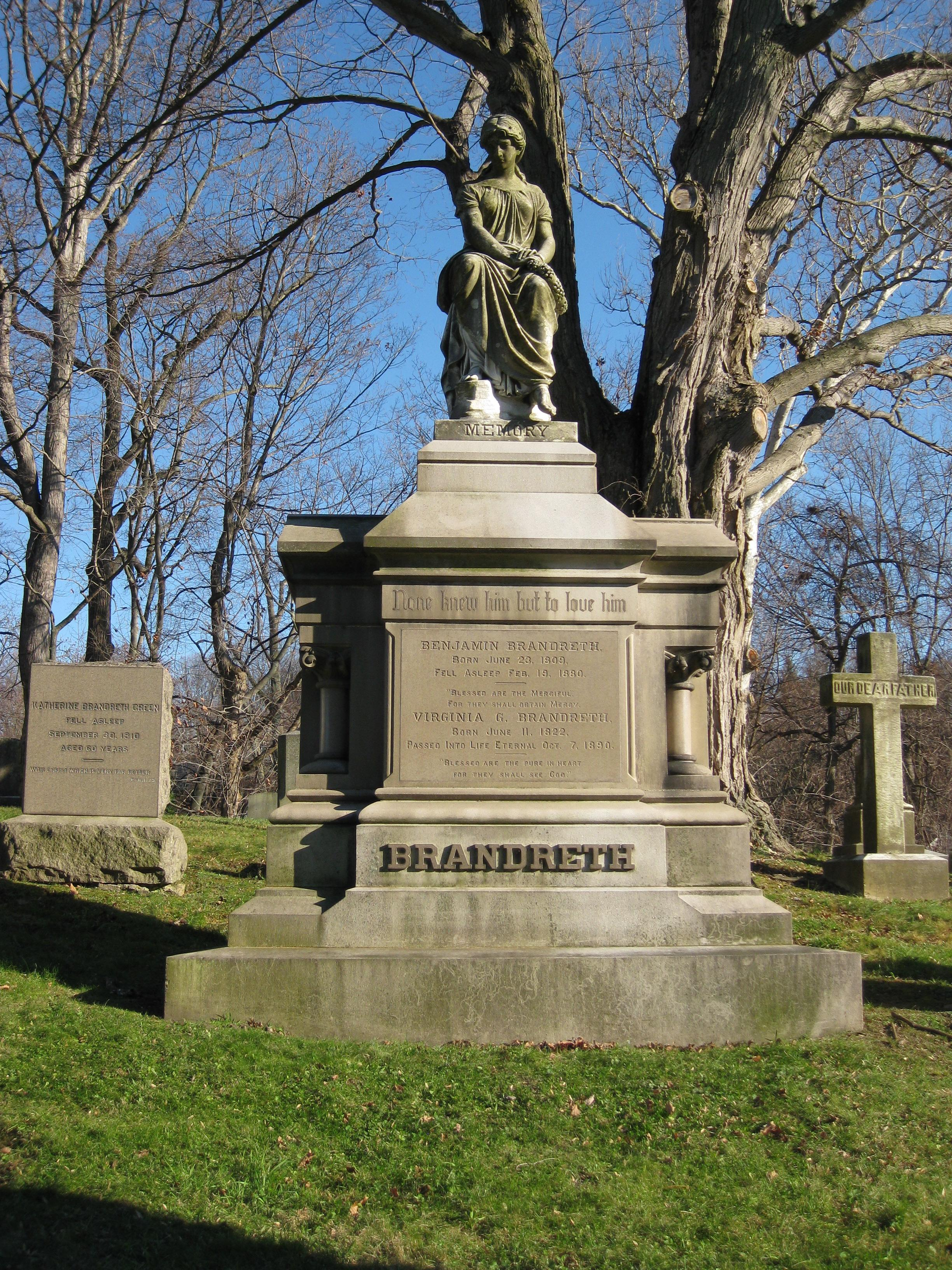
- Grave marker of Benjamin and Virginia Brandreth at the Dale Cemetery in Ossining, NY as it appeared in November, 2008
- Interactive map of Dale Cemetery

Details
- Established: 1851
- Location: Ossining, NY
- Country: United States
- Coordinates: 41.171039°N 73.856059°W
- Owned by: Town of Ossining
- Size: 47 acres (190,000 m^{2})
- Website: dalecemetery.com
- Find a Grave: Dale Cemetery

The Dale Cemetery located in Ossining, New York, is a town-owned rural cemetery encompassing 47 acres (19 ha) and has been operational since October 1851. In 2013 it was listed on the National Register of Historic Places.

== History ==
The cemetery was originally owned by the Dale Cemetery Association, which was incorporated on January 16, 1851; it was dedicated in October 1851. It was designed by Howard Daniels, a prominent 19th-century American landscape architect and a leading proponent of the rural-cemetery movement. Its first President was Aaron Ward, retired congressman. The cemetery was acquired by the Town of Ossining in 2004.

== Notable interments ==
- Thomas Allcock (1815–1891), Civil War General for the Union Army
- Franz Boas (1858–1942), the "Father of American anthropology"
- George Borup (1885-1912), member of Robert Peary's expedition to the North Pole
- Benjamin Brandreth (1807–1880), proprietor of Brandreth's Pills, one of the earliest mass market consumer branded products in the United States, founder of Brandreth Park
- Chester Hoff (1891–1998), Oldest ex-Major League Baseball player at time of death. He played for the NY Highlanders (later the NY Yankees) and St. Louis Browns.
- John Thompson Hoffman (1828–1888), governor of New York (1869–72), Mayor of New York City (1866–68)
- Elijah Hunter (1749–1815), Revolutionary War soldier, Patriot spy, and local religious leader
- Ingersoll Lockwood (1841–1918), lawyer and writer (Section A)
- Edwin A. McAlpin (1848–1917), president of the D.H. McAlpin & Co tobacco company, builder of the Hotel McAlpin, the largest hotel in the world, and Adjutant General of the State of New York
- Sonny Sharrock (1940–1994), jazz guitarist
- Aaron Ward (1790–1867), American congressman
- Samuel Youngs (1760–1839), who in 1851 was moved from his earlier burial site at the Old Dutch Burying Ground in Sleepy Hollow and became the first person interred at Dale Cemetery. He was a possible inspiration for the character Ichabod Crane in his friend Washington Irving's story "The Legend of Sleepy Hollow".

== See also ==
- National Register of Historic Places listings in northern Westchester County, New York
