= 1860 New York gubernatorial election =

- November 6, 1860
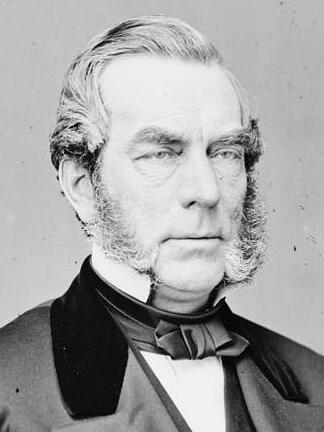

Nominee	Edwin D. Morgan	William Kelly
Party	Republican	Democratic
Alliance		Constitutional Union
Popular vote	358,272	294,812
Percentage	53.24%	43.81%
- County results Morgan: 40–50% 50–60% 60–70% 70–80% Kelly: 40–50% 50–60% 60–70%
Governor before election
Edwin D. Morgan
Republican
Elected Governor
Edwin D. Morgan
Republican

The 1860 New York gubernatorial election was held on November 6, 1860. Incumbent Governor Edwin D. Morgan was re-elected to a second term in office over William Kelly. The election was held alongside a referendum on universal adult male suffrage, which failed.

== Constitutional Union nomination ==
The Constitution Union state convention met on July 13 at Utica. They appointed a committee to form an electoral ticket "at a suitable time ... in such manner as they deem best calculated to unite National Union men of every name and designation." The committee ultimately resolved to endorse the Douglas Democratic ticket, led by William Kelly.

== Democratic nominations ==
=== Breckinridge Democratic nomination ===
==== Candidates ====
- James T. Brady, New York City attorney
- Greene C. Bronson, former Chief Judge of the New York Court of Appeals
- Charles O'Conor, former U.S. Attorney for the Southern District of New York
- John Adams Dix, former U.S. Senator and Secretary of State of New York

==== Convention ====
The minority faction of the Democratic Party, which supported John C. Breckinridge for president, met in Syracuse on August 8. James T. Brady was nominated for governor with little opposition. Brady accepted the nomination in a letter dated on August 14.

1860 Breckinridge Democratic convention
Party	Candidate	Votes	%
Independent Democratic	James T. Brady	99	86.09%
Independent Democratic	Charles O'Conor	8	6.96%
Independent Democratic	Greene C. Bronson	3	2.61%
Independent Democratic	Brown	2	1.74%
Independent Democratic	Lawrence	1	0.87%
Independent Democratic	Kemble	1	0.87%
Independent Democratic	G. J. Tucker	1	0.87%
Total votes		115	100.00%

=== Douglas Democratic nomination ===
The majority faction of the Democratic Party, which supported Stephen A. Douglas for president, met in Syracuse one week later, on August 15. They nominated William Kelly.

== General election ==
=== Candidates ===
- James T. Brady, New York City attorney (Breckinridge Democratic)
- William Goodell, founder of the American Anti-Slavery Society (Radical Abolitionist)
- Edwin D. Morgan, incumbent Governor since 1859 (Republican)
- William Kelly, former State Senator from Rhinebeck (Douglas Democratic)

=== Results ===
1860 New York gubernatorial election
Party	Candidate	Votes	%	±%
Republican	Edwin D. Morgan (incumbent)	358,272	53.24%	▲7.75
Democratic	William Kelly	294,812	43.81%	▲1.50
Independent Democratic	James T. Brady	19,841	2.95%	N/A
Total votes		672,925	100.00%	

== See also ==
- New York gubernatorial elections
- 1860 United States elections
