= Peasant homes in medieval England =

Peasant homes in medieval England were centered around the hearth while some larger homes may have had separate areas for food processing like brewhouses and bakehouses, and storage areas like barns and granaries. There was almost always a fire burning, sometimes left covered at night, because it was easier than relighting the fire.

== Background ==
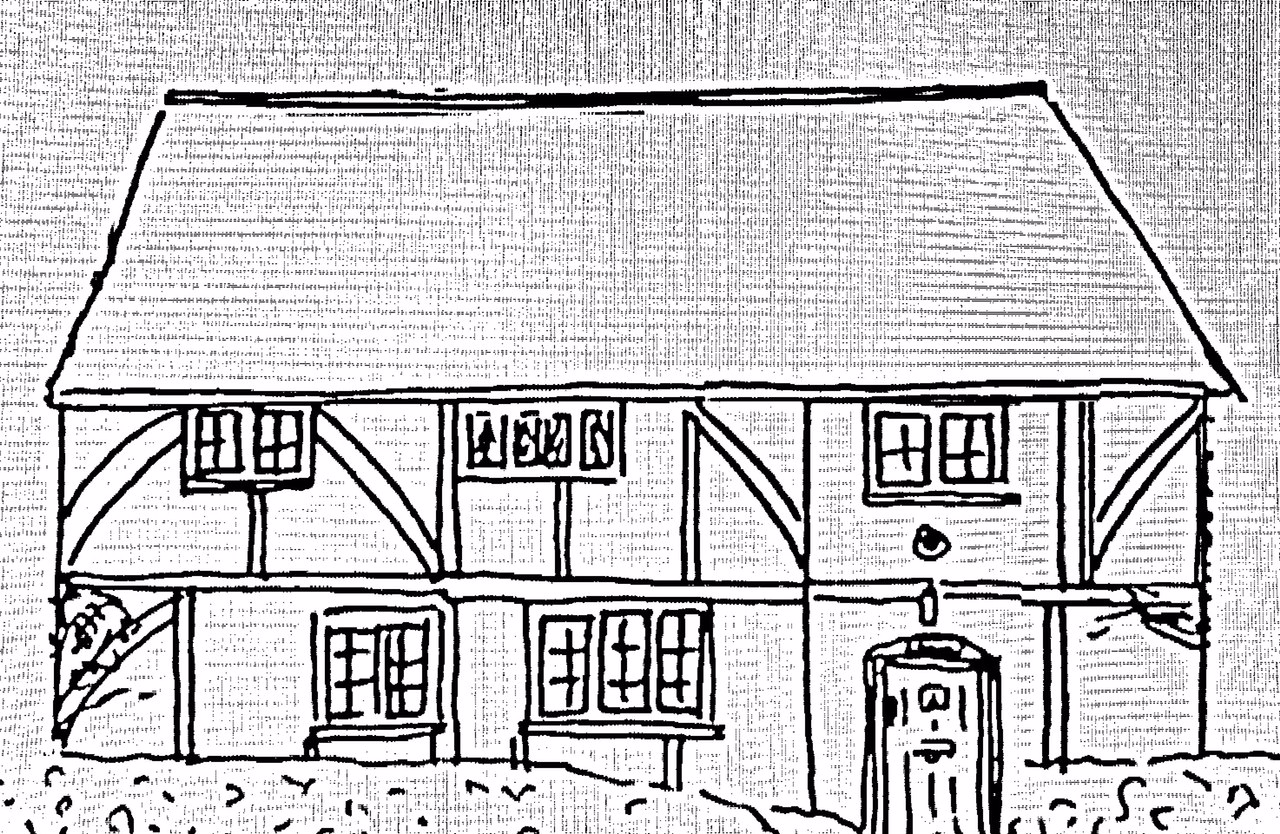
A sketch of a medieval cottage

Historians have generally had low opinions of peasant houses describing them as "hardly more than crude huts" and "primitive...for the most part (houses) were small, with one or two rooms for people and animals alike." Historians had long held the view that peasant houses were not built to last and would not last more than a generation but new evidence has proven this false and it is now accepted by historians and archaeologists that "later medieval houses survive in their thousands".

The label "peasant" encompasses a wider range of social classes than previously thought. By the 15th century, wealthier sub-classes of peasants were beginning to emerge under the manorial estates in the rural countryside of at least some parts of England, notably in the pastoral areas more than the heavily agrarian areas of the Midlands. Glass and lime cement only became available midway through the 1500s (Rev. William Harrison. A Description of England 1577) some time after what is generally considered Medieval. The Wealden buildings in Kent are associated with a rising and prosperous group of yeomen. Smaller houses of cruck construction found the Midlands are believed to belong to peasants of more modest means. It is, however, usually not possible to link a specific home with a particular historic holding but some general observations may be possible like the house was part of a yardland farm.

== Legal instruments ==
Few peasant landholders were free tenants. The norm for peasant homes was customary tenure or copyhold tenure, though the particulars of legal status were often not as important in practice as the agricultural resources made available by the land.

== Features ==
Some common features of medieval peasant homes in Southern England were the open hall and the lack of a chimney or upper floor, evidenced by soot from the central hearth. Homes in Kent, Sussex and East Anglia share some interesting architectural traits observable in the roof structure, beam mouldings, crown posts and bracing patterns. Peasant houses in these areas tend to be of good quality, and scholars believe that they would have belonged to a relatively well to do peasant sub-class. Midland houses are simpler, usually cruck houses where the roof and walls are supported by paired timbers called "cruck blades", but also some box-frame houses (though fewer than other parts of England) and earlier aisled houses.

=== Hearth and kitchen ===
The hearth could be very simple, and cooking might be done on bakestones or pots arranged in various ways to use direct heat by placing them directly on the fire, or indirect heat by suspending them over the fire or placing them around the edge. By the second half of the 14th century brandreths or iron grates are places over the fires in some parts of England, and pots placed on top of the grates, an early form of the modern cooking range. If a fuel other than wood, such as coal, was used the hearth would then have a more complex design. (Coal was the main fuel source in some areas like Derbyshire.)

Even a small peasant kitchen was typically stocked with brass and earthenware pots and pans, brandreths, table linens, storage chests and vats. Larger holdings would have had more linens, basins, ewers and larger pots and pans. Pot lids for earthenware vessels were a simple medieval innovation that allowed more efficient use of fuel and more intense flavors to develop in the preparation of foods. Earthenware was used for boiling water, cooking vegetables, meat stews and to process dairy products.

== Brewing ==
Most historical literature focuses on brewers who were licensed by the manorial courts, but in the peasant households of the rural countryside small scale brewing of ale was commonplace.

== Identification of peasant houses ==
Researchers usually use established structural features attested to in substantial literary sources to rule out 16th or 17th century houses, thereby identifying houses of the medieval period by elimination.
