= John G. Farnsworth =

Adjutant General of New York (1832–1895)

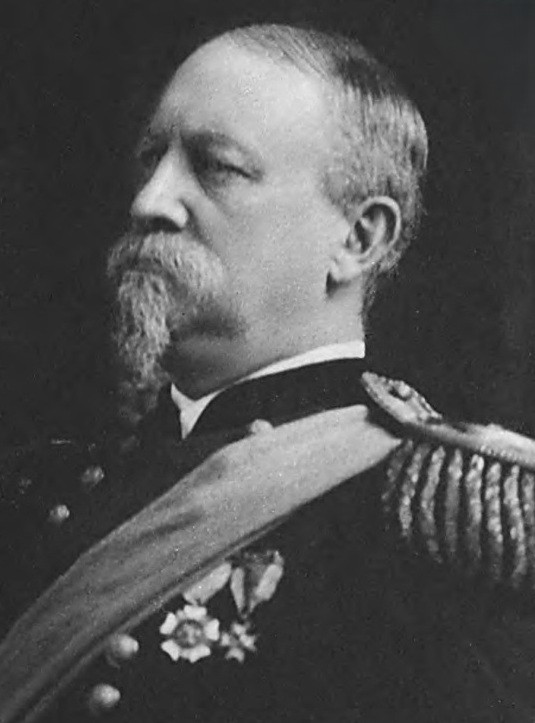
- From 1911's New York State Men
- Born: 21 January 1832; Elmira, New York, US
- Died: 6 April 1895 (aged 63); Washington, DC, US
- Burial place: Albany Rural Cemetery, Menands, New York, US
- Spouse: Sarah V. Gourlay (m. 1856–1895)
- Children: 2
- Military career
- Allegiance: Union (American Civil War); United States
- Service: Union Army (Civil War); New York National Guard (United States)
- Service years: 1861–1865 (Army); 1866–1871 (National Guard); 1883–1886 (National Guard); 1890 (National Guard)
- Rank: Captain (Army); Colonel (Brevet); Major General (National Guard)
- Unit: US Army Quartermaster Corps
- Commands: Wheeling, West Virginia Quartermaster Depot; Chief Quartermaster, Department of West Virginia; 10th Regiment, New York National Guard; Adjutant General of New York
- Wars: American Civil War
- Other work: Businessman

Signature
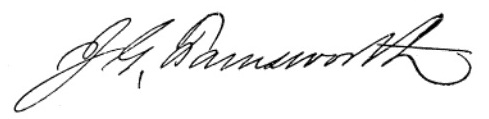

John G. Farnsworth (21 January 1832 – 6 April 1895) was an American businessman and National Guard officer from Albany, New York. A native of Elmira, New York and Union Army veteran of the American Civil War, Farnsworth attained the rank of major general as Adjutant General of New York. In his civilian career, Farnsworth was a partner in J. O. Towner & Co., an Albany lumber wholesaler.

== Early life ==
John Gosman Farnsworth was born in Elmira, New York on 21 January 1832, a son of Marshall L. Farnsworth and Joanna B. (Gosman) Farnsworth. He was educated at academies in Ithaca, New York, Albany, New York, and Pittsfield, Massachusetts, then began a business career with J. O. Towner & Co., an Albany lumber wholesaler; Farnsworth eventually became a partner in company.

A Democrat who supported the Union, at the start of the American Civil War, Farnsworth joined a militia company, the Albany Zouave Cadets, as a private. His company was mustered into federal service as Company B, 76th New York Infantry Regiment, and he served until leaving the regiment to accept an officer's commission.

== Start of career ==
In April 1862, Farnsworth joined the Union Army as a quartermaster with the rank of captain. He initially performed duty with the Army of the Potomac, and his success in this post led to his assignment in July 1862 as chief quartermaster of the IV Corps. From August 1863 to January 1864, he served on the staff of Montgomery C. Meigs, the army's quartermaster general. Farnsworth accompanied Meigs on an inspection tour of the army's western departments, and was with him during the Chattanooga campaign, including the Battle of Missionary Ridge and Battle of Lookout Mountain.

From February to November 1864, Farnsworth commanded the quartermaster depot in Wheeling, West Virginia. From November 1864 to September 1865, he was chief quartermaster of the Department of West Virginia with headquarters in Cumberland, Maryland. The war ended in April 1865 and Farnsworth resigned his commission in October 1865. At the end of his service, he received brevet promotions to major, lieutenant colonel and colonel of United States Volunteers.

== Later career ==
In October 1866, Farnsworth returned to military service as aide-de-camp to the commander of the New York Militia's 3rd Division. In September 1868, Farnsworth was appointed commander of the 10th Regiment with the rank of colonel, and he held this position until 1871. In 1878, he was appointed to Albany's Washington Park Commission, and he served for nine years. In January 1883, Governor Grover Cleveland appointed him to succeed Frederick Townsend as Adjutant General of New York. During his term, the National Guard improved in personnel strength, discipline and efficiency, and the Camp of Instruction in Peekskill established by his predecessor was made permanent. At Farnsworth's direction, a new service uniform was adopted, a uniform military code became law, and new regulations to standardize administration and training were implemented. In 1884, Farnsworth requested use of a federal fort so he could provide a National Guard regiment instruction and training in coast artillery. The project proved successful and was continued after Farnsworth left office in 1886. In 1885, he was one of several aides-de-camp appointed to assist Winfield Scott Hancock, commander of the Department of the East, during Hancock's planning and execution of the New York City funeral procession for Ulysses S. Grant, and was in charge of Albany's ceremonies for Grant. He was succeeded as adjutant general by Josiah Porter.

In the mid-1880s, Farnsworth was appointed receiver of the Bankers' and Merchants' Telegraph Company, which had originally been organized to compete with Western Union. Following its financial collapse, the company became embroiled in lawsuits against Western Union. At Farnsworth's direction, attorneys including Roscoe Conkling and Robert G. Ingersoll sued Western Union for damaging Bankers' and Merchants' business by taking possession of and cutting its lines. The suit was successful, and the plaintiffs obtained a $240,000 judgment (almost $9 million in 2026). Farnsworth was a member of the Military Order of the Loyal Legion of the United States, Grand Army of the Republic, Society of the Army of the Potomac, Fort Orange Club, and Freemasons.

In 1886, Farnsworth was placed in charge of New York's pursuit of wartime claims against the federal government. He was still serving in this position when he died, and the effort ultimately succeeded in recovering for the state about $3,000,000 (about $118 million in 2026). At the close of his term as adjutant general, Farnsworth was placed on the super-numerary list, subject to recall if required. He was called up briefly in 1890 and sent to Syracuse to take command of troops activated in response to a potential riot during a strike by area railroad workers.

== Personal ==
In 1856 Farnsworth married Sarah V. Gourlay of Albany. They were married until his death and were the parents of two children, son John and daughter Emma.

Farnsworth died on 6 April 1895 after a stroke while staying at the Arlington Hotel in Washington, D.C. He had become ill in early 1895 and traveled to Washington hoping a more mild climate would improve his health. He was buried at Albany Rural Cemetery.
