= Josiah Porter =

New York attorney and National Guard major general (1830–1894)

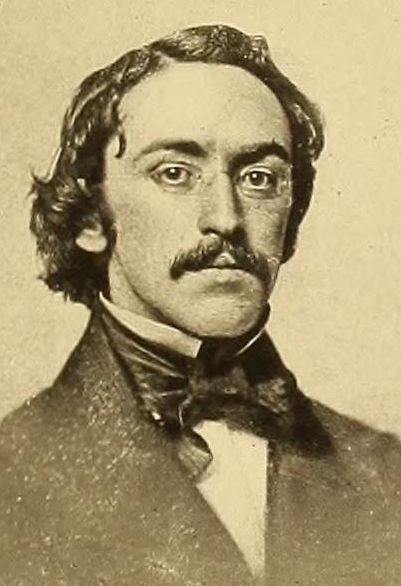
- From 1922's Annals of the Harvard Class of 1852
- Born: 28 June 1830; Boston, Massachusetts, US
- Died: 14 December 1894 (aged 64); Manhattan, New York, US
- Burial place: Mount Auburn Cemetery, Cambridge, Massachusetts, US
- Alma mater: Harvard College; Harvard Law School
- Spouse: Caroline Hamilton Rice (m. 1857–1894)
- Children: 4
- Military career
- Allegiance: Union (American Civil War); United States
- Service: Union Army; New York National Guard
- Service years: 1861–1862 (Army); 1865–1894 (National Guard)
- Rank: Major General
- Unit: US Army Field Artillery Branch
- Commands: 1st Massachusetts Battery; Company G, 22nd Regiment, New York National Guard; 22nd Regiment, New York National Guard; Adjutant General of New York
- Wars: American Civil War
- Other work: Attorney

Signature
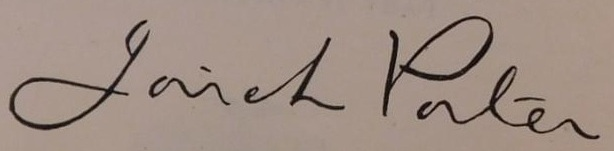

Josiah Porter (28 June 1830 – 14 December 1894) was an American attorney and National Guard officer from New York. A Union Army veteran of the American Civil War, he went on to practice law in New York City and serve in the state's National Guard. In 1886, he was appointed Adjutant General of New York with the rank of major general and he served until his death.

== Early life ==
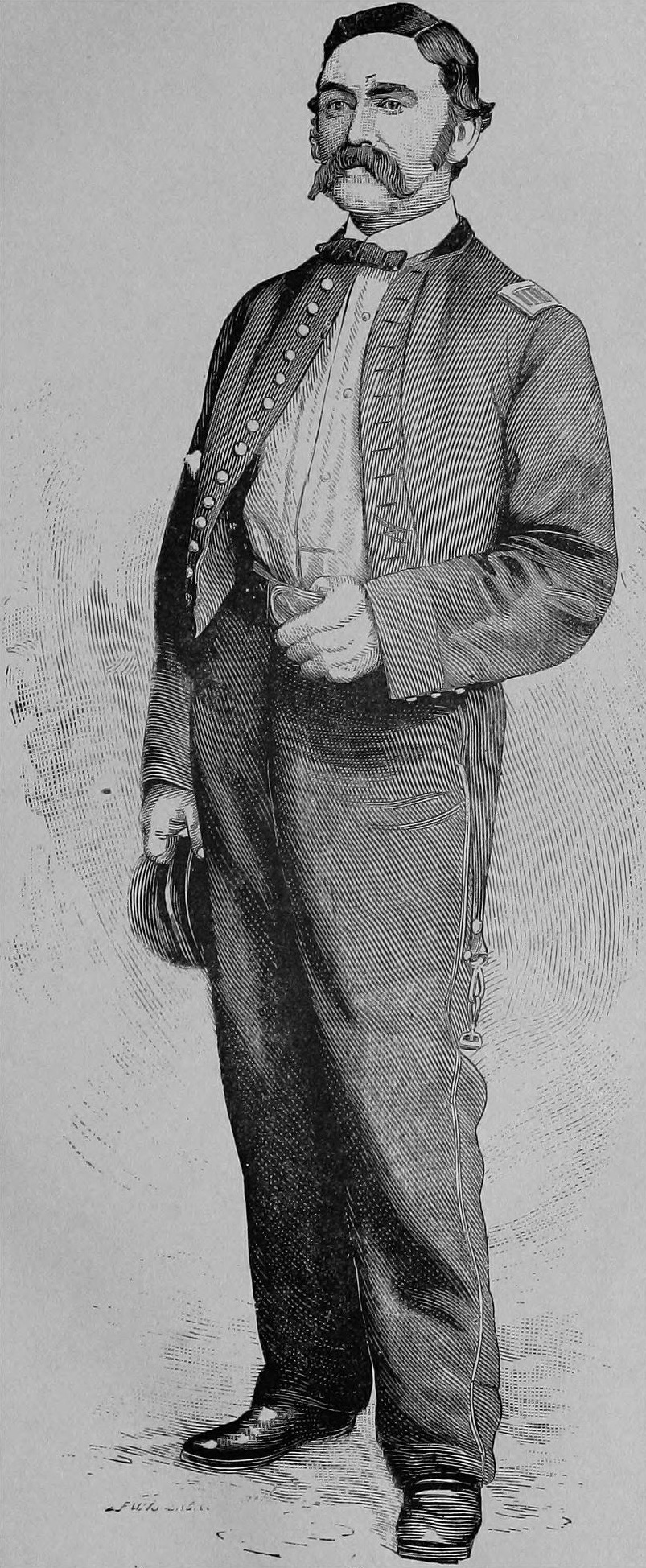
Porter as a captain during the Civil War

Josiah Porter was born in Boston on 28 June 1830, a son of hotelier Zachariah B. Porter and Mary (Kingsbury) Porter. (Note: Some sources give Porter's birthplace as Cambridge or North Cambridge, Massachusetts, but the Cambridge town records for 1830 indicate that Boston is correct.) He was raised in North Cambridge, Massachusetts and educated at Chauncy Hall School. He then attended Harvard College, from which he received his AB degree in 1852. Porter next enrolled at Harvard Law School, from which he received his LL.B. degree in 1854. Porter then practiced law in Boston, where he also served with a volunteer militia unit, the Boston Cadets. In addition, he served as adjutant of the Ancient and Honorable Artillery Company of Massachusetts. A Democrat in politics, in the late 1850s, Porter served on the Cambridge board of aldermen.

The American Civil War began in April 1861 and in May Porter joined the Union Army, receiving his commission as a first lieutenant in the 1st Massachusetts Battery, a light artillery unit organized to serve for three months. The battery took part in the Peninsula campaign in Virginia. The 1st Massachusetts Battery was mustered out in August, and Porter returned to Massachusetts to reorganize the unit, which he commanded as a captain. Porter's battery took part in the Maryland campaign of 1862; his illness and the death of his mother led him to resign his commission in 1862. Porter resumed the practice of law in Boston, where he remained until 1865, when he moved to Manhattan.

== Career ==
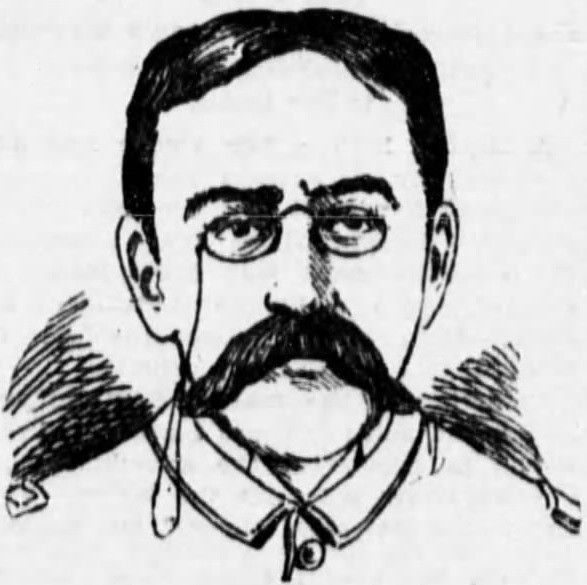
Newspaper illustration of Porter in 1894

After moving to New York, Porter practiced law and became a supporter of the Democratic Party organization run by Tammany Hall. In June 1865, he returned to military service as commander of the New York National Guard's Company G, 22nd Regiment. He was elected the regiment's major in May 1867. In 1868, he was elected to the New York State Assembly, and he served in the 92nd Legislature (1869). Beginning in 1869, he served for several years as judge of New York City's 9th District Civil Court.

In January 1869, he was elected the 22nd Regiment's second-in-command with the rank of lieutenant colonel. In October 1869, Porter was appointed commander and promoted to colonel. He continued in charge of the regiment until January 1886, when Governor David B. Hill appointed him to succeed John G. Farnsworth as Adjutant General of New York with the rank of major general. He continued in this position until January 1894, when he was succeeded by Thomas H. McGrath.

Porter's efforts to improve the National Guard included elimination of division headquarters and reorganization of units into separate brigades. He also continued improvements to the National Guard's training site at what is now Camp Smith in Peekskill, and typically spent extensive time there each summer as units rotated in and out during their annual encampments. When violence appeared imminent during the 1892 Buffalo switchmen's strike, Porter's efforts to enhance training and readiness enabled the National Guard to dispatch 8,000 troops within a few hours, and the strike soon ended.

== Personal ==
After retiring as adjutant general, Porter resumed practicing law in New York City. On 12 December 1894, he experienced a stroke shortly after attending a banquet organized by the National Guard's 7th Infantry Regiment. He did not recover, and died at his West 56th Street in Manhattan on 14 December 1894. He was buried at Mount Auburn Cemetery in Cambridge, Massachusetts.

A bronze statue of Porter created by William Clark Noble was commissioned by the National Guard Association of New York State. It was dedicated in 1902 and is displayed on the grounds of Van Cortlandt Park in the Bronx. The Porter statue is located behind the Van Cortlandt House at Broadway and 245th Street.

In 1857, Porter married Caroline Hamilton Rice of Southborough, Massachusetts. They were married until his death and were the parents of four children, two sons who died in 1863 at ages one and two, and two daughters who lived to adulthood.
