= Emery Hetrick =

American psychiatrist (1931–1987)

Emery S. Hetrick (September 27, 1931 – February 4, 1987) was an American psychiatrist and one of the founders of the Hetrick-Martin Institute (HMI), originally known as the Institute for the Protection of Lesbian and Gay Youth (IPLGY), which in turn founded the Harvey Milk High School in New York City.

== Biography ==
Emery Sylvester Hetrick as born on September 27, 1931, in Columbus, Ohio. He was born to parents Emery S. Hetrick Sr. and Alice F. Hetrick. He had an older sister, Virigina Hetrick.

His partner, both personally and at the HMI, was A. Damien Martin. In 2015, both were named Icons for LGBT History Month. As a couple, they'd been together since 1975 and lived together on the Upper East Side of Manhattan. They are buried together at Green-Wood Cemetery in Brooklyn, with the inscription "Death ends a life, not a relationship."

A 1953 graduate of Ohio State University, he went on to graduate in 1957 from the Cornell University Medical School.

Hetrick was an assistant professor of clinical psychiatry at New York University Medical Center. He was also a member of the State Task Force on Gay Lesbian Issues, as appointed by Gov. Mario M. Cuomo.

Hetrick had been an attending psychiatrist and supervisor at the Harlem Hospital Center and associate medical director of Pfizer's Roerig Division. He started working for them in 1979 and resigned in 1986 for health reasons.

At Harlem Hospital, Hetrick had been chief of their psychiatric crisis and emergency treatment unit (1976–1979) and at Gouverneur Diagnostic and Treatment Center, from 1974 until 1976, was Acting Chief of the Psychiatry Department.

He was the first psychiatrist hired by the Ackerman Institute for the Family.

Hetrick died in of AIDS related respiratory failure at the age of 56.

== Founding of Hetrick-Martin Institute ==
After hearing a story about a 15-year-old boy being beaten and forcibly removed from his emergency housing because he was identified as gay, Hetrick and his partner Damien Martin they established the Institute for the Protection of Lesbian and Gay Youth in 1979.

The Hetrick-Martin Institute is a service and advocacy institute for LGBTQ+ youth. They provide academic support, health screenings, job trainings, showers and meals.

The institute was renamed in 1987 after Hetrick's death in his honor.

== Publications ==
- Innovations in Psychotherapy with Homosexuals, co-editor. Monograph published by the American Psychiatric Press
