= New York State Agricultural Society =

Agricultural lobby

- Formation: 1832
- Founded at: Albany, New York, U.S.
- Type: NGO
- Website: nysagsociety.org

The New York State Agricultural Society was founded in 1832, with the goal of promoting agricultural improvement. One of its main activities is operating the annual New York State Fair.

== Activities ==
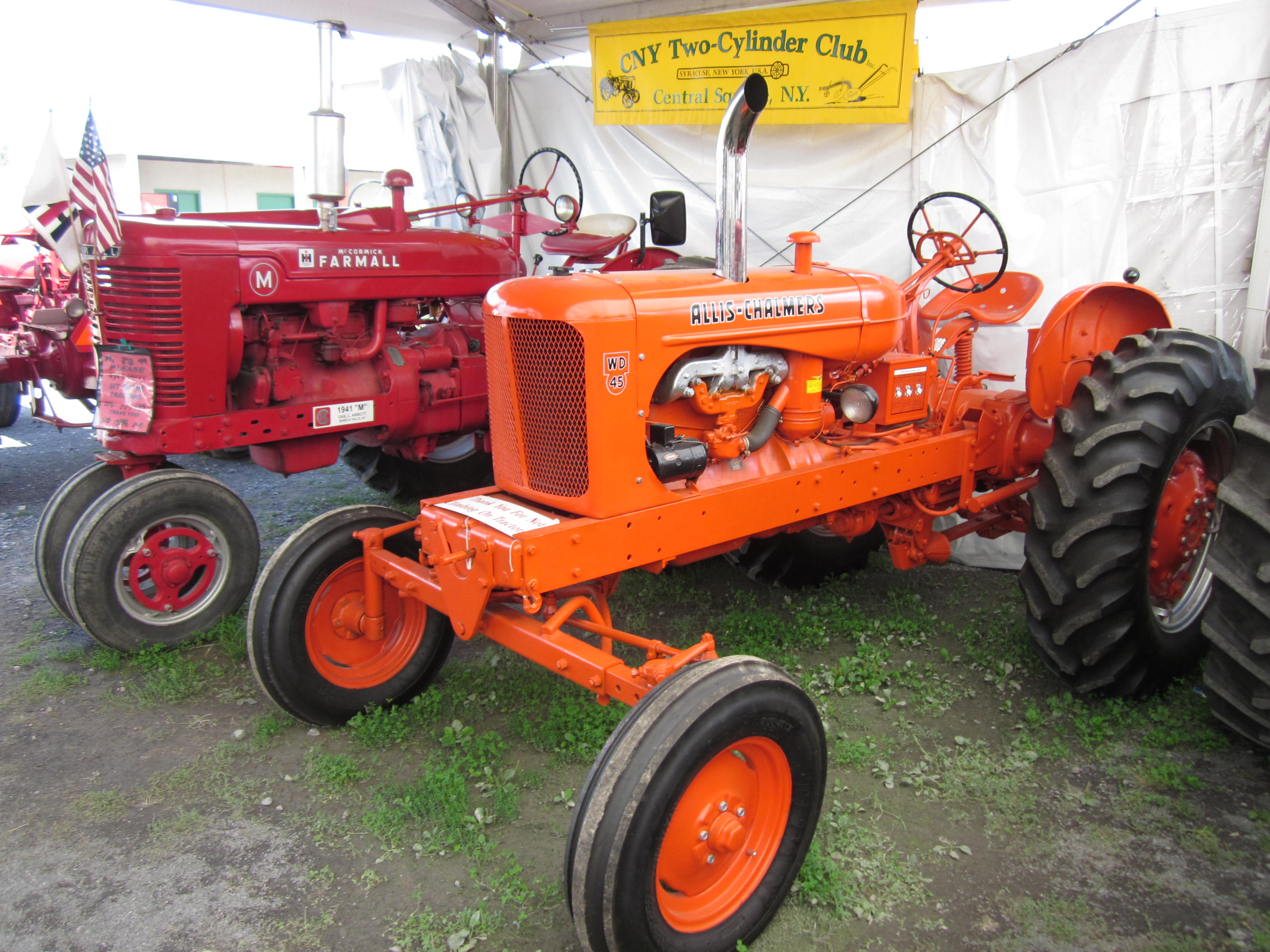
Tractors on display at the 2011 fair

A major activity of the society is running the annual New York State Fair. The first such fair was held in 1841, in Syracuse, and drew 10,000 attendees over two days. The second was held in Albany, with Auburn, Buffalo, Elmira, New York City, Poughkeepsie, Rochester, Saratoga Springs, Watertown and Utica all hosting fairs between 1842 and 1889. For the 1855 fair in Elmira, several railroads put on extra trains to bring fairgoers from neighboring villages. The fair moved permanently back to Syracuse in 1890.

The society publishes a newspaper titled The Cultivator. Originally a monthly publication, as of 2020 it is semi-annual. The society supports research into ways to make farms more productive, such as the best type of grass to grow for feeding dairy cows, and whether grass fields should grow naturally or be plowed and reseeded periodically. From 1842 to 1889 they published the Transactions of the New-York State Agricultural Society, which became the Annual report of the New York State Agricultural Society.

The society honors New York State agricultural businesses with a Business of the Year award. Every year since 1937, the society has also given the Century Farm Award in four out of 56 counties on a rotating basis. These awards were given to farms that had been owned and operated by one family for one hundred years, where the families were also "good farmers and active members of the community in which they live". The society's annual dinner is traditionally attended by the governor of New York State, hosting dignitaries such as US Department of Agriculture secretary Arthur Hyde, newspaper publisher Frank Gannett, and University of Maryland president Raymond Pearson. The society also runs the New York State Agricultural Society Foundation, which makes grants to young scholars to promote agricultural literacy, professional skills, and provide funding for students to attend the society's annual functions.

In 1876, the society had an income of $41,210 (equivalent to $1,220,000 in 2024). Of that, $15,086 ($445,000 in 2024) was from the state fair. In 1900, as a result of a change to a state law, the New York State Agricultural Society was mandated to receive $20,000 ($756,000 in 2024) in premiums "of all moneys appropriated for the promotion of agriculture in any one year".

== Notable past presidents ==
The following is a list of notable past society presidents.

- Jesse Buel (1834–1835)
- Archibald McIntyre (1836)
- John P. Beekman (1837–1838, 1844)
- James S. Wadsworth (1842–1843)
- Lewis F. Allen (1848)
- John A. King (1949)
- Lewis Morris (1853)
- William Kelly (1854)
- Alonzo S. Upham (1857)
- Abraham B. Conger (1859)
- Benjamin N. Huntington (1860)
- George Geddes (1861)
- Ezra Cornell (1862)
- Edward G. Faile (1863)
- John Stanton Gould (1866)
- Marsena R. Patrick (1867–1868)
- Benjamin F. Angel (1873–1874)
- John B. Dutcher (1893–1894)
- Benjamin F. Tracy (1897-1898)
- Rosswell P. Flower (1899)
- Timothy L. Woodruff (1900)
- Millard Davis (1937–1938)
- Leigh G. Kirkland (1941)

== Publications of the New York State Agricultural Society ==
- The Cultivator(1834-1864) (digitized from HathiTrust)
- The Journal of the New-York State Agricultural Society (1850-1873) (digitized from HathiTrust)
- Proceedings of the Annual Meeting (1841-1899) digitized from HathiTrust)
