= Courtenay Brandreth =

American naturalist

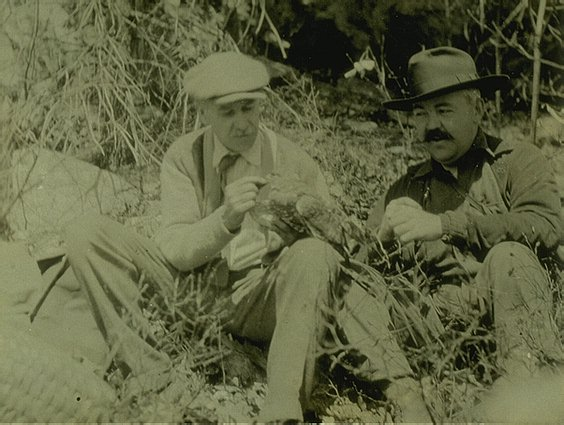
Fuertes and Brandreth, 1924

Courtenay Brandreth (5 February 1891 – 3 November 1947) was an American naturalist and wildlife artist who trained under Louis Agassiz Fuertes. He managed the factory established by his grandfather Benjamin Brandreth and produced paintings and illustrated numerous books.

== Biography ==
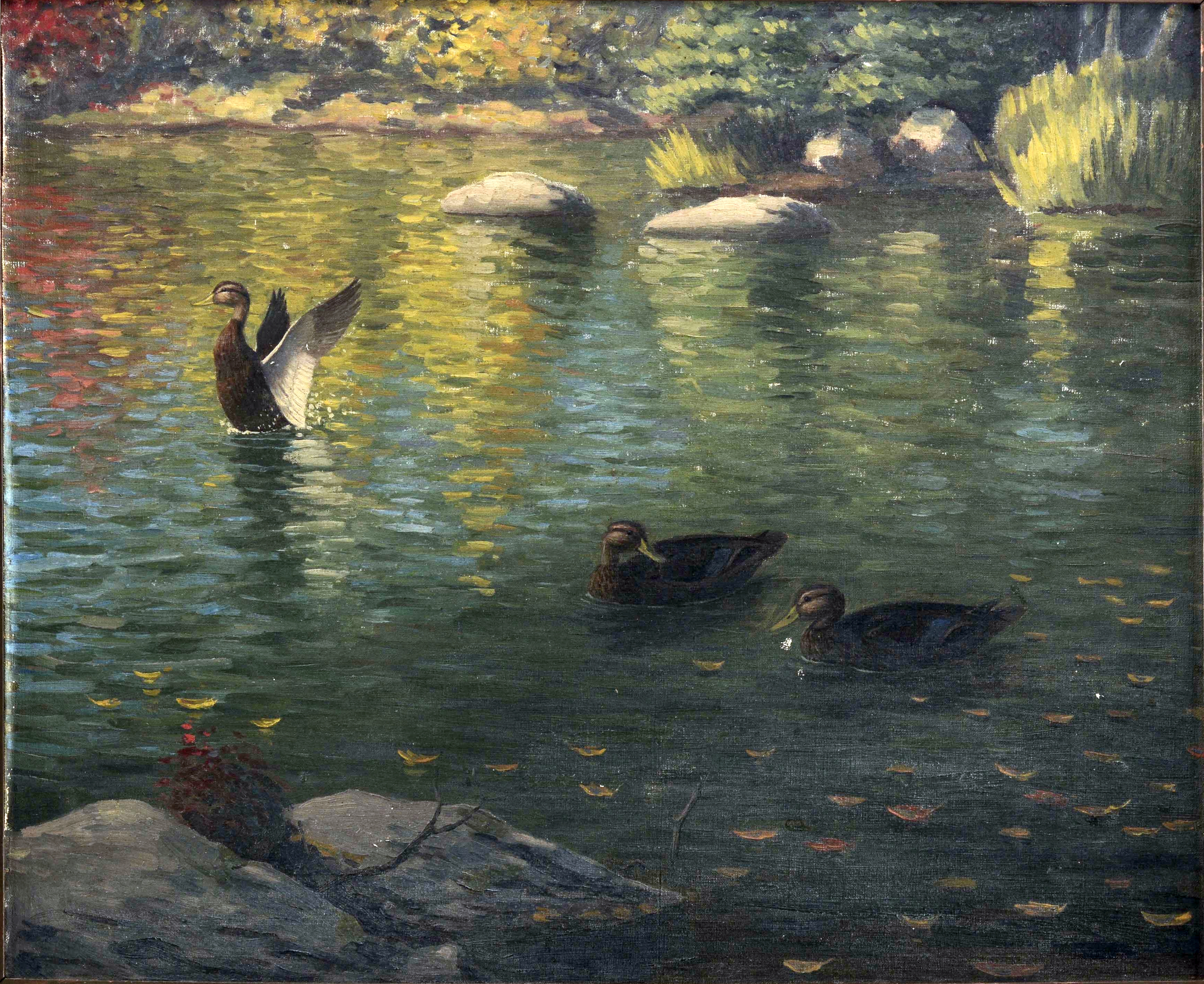
Black ducks on a pond, a painting by Brandreth

Brandreth was born in Ossining, New York, to Colonel Franklin and Pauline Burgess. He was a grandson of Benjamin Brandreth, a wealthy manufacturer of pills, who purchased a large estate in the Adirondacks surrounding a lake now known as Brandreth park. His father was a noted ornithological collector and summers were spent in the Adirondacks. He went to study at Cornell University where he trained in bird art under Louis Agassiz Fuertes. From 1928, he managed the family factory business (which produced humane animal traps among other items) while also producing paintings and illustrated several books.
