= Edwin A. McAlpin =

United States Army general

Edwin Augustus McAlpin
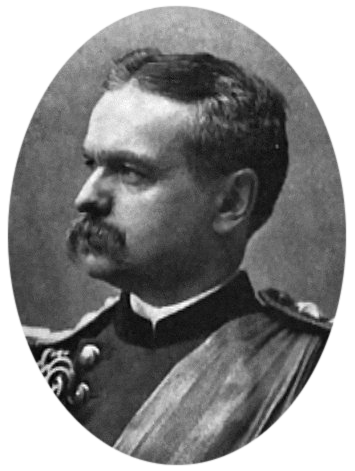
- General McAlpin, circa 1899
- Born: 9 June 1848; Ossining, New York, US
- Died: 12 April 1917 (aged 68); Ossining, New York
- Education: Phillips Academy
- Employer(s): D.H. McAlpin & Co
- Known for: Commander of the 71st Regiment of the New York Militia, (Later the New York Guard), Adjutant General of the State of New York, CEO of D.H. McAlpin & Co a large tobacco manufacturer in New York City, real estate owner in New York City. Mayor of Ossining, NY.
- Title: General
- Board member of: D.H. McAlpin & Co; Canal Street Building Corp; Great Eastern Casualty Co.; Hudson Trust Co.; John J. Cooke Co.
- Spouse: Anne Brandreth McAlpin
- Children: 5

General Edwin Augustus McAlpin (9 June 1848 – 12 April 1917) was an American businessperson, military officer, and politician. He was president of the D.H. McAlpin & Co., a tobacco manufacturer. He built the Hotel McAlpin in New York City, at the time the largest hotel in the world. He had an active military career in the New York National Guard and was appointed Adjutant General of New York by the Governor. He was president of the American Boy Scouts and the Mayor of Ossining, New York.

== Biography ==
=== Military career ===
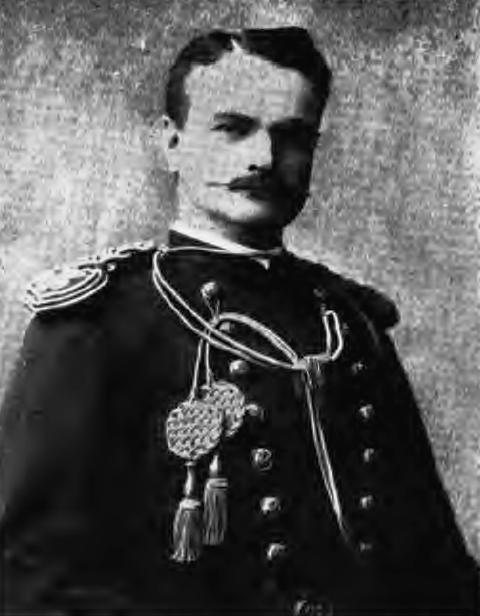
Colonel E.A. McAlpin, commander of the 71st Regiment, New York National Guard

General McAlpin was born 9 June 1848, the son of David Hunter McAlpin, a prominent tobacco manufacturer in New York City, and Adelaide Rose McAlpin, in Ossining, New York. McAlpin attended public school for a time, then graduated from Phillips Academy in Andover, Massachusetts, in 1861. Following his graduation, McAlpin joined his father’s company, D. H. McAlpin & Co. With the outbreak of hostilities, McAlpin enlisted in the Civil War as a drummer boy, but his father rescinded the action due to his youth at age 17. After the end of the war, he was old enough to enlist in his own right and in 1869 joined the 7th Regiment of the New York Militia, (later the New York Guard) with the rank of private.

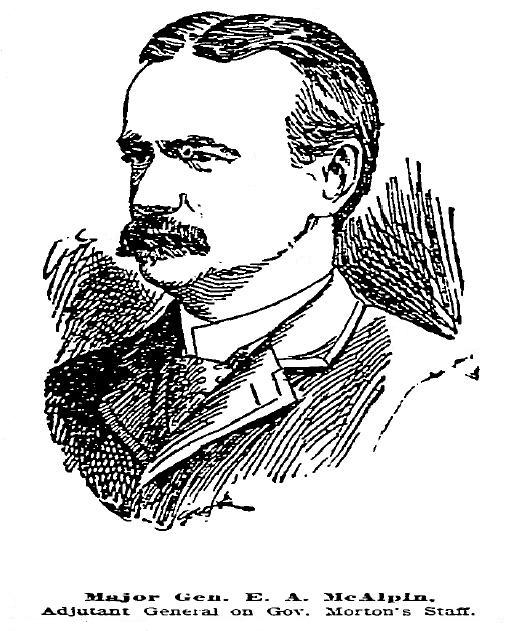
General McAlpin portrait circa 1895

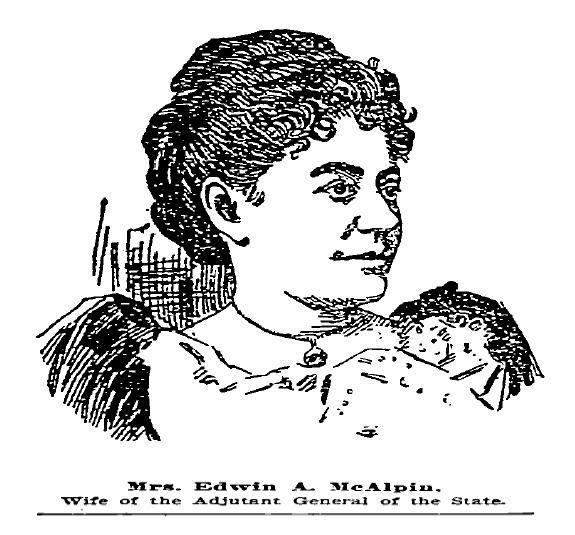
Anne Brandreth McAlpin, wife of General E.A. McAlpin

In 1874 McAlpin attained the rank of first lieutenant in the 71st Infantry Regiment (New York) where he was promoted in 1885 to colonel, a role he retained until his military retirement in 1887. McAlpin had inherited a disorganized and dispirited regiment which was in danger of being disbanded by the State of New York. He aggressively cut dead wood from the ranks and reorganized the officer ranks to the extent that the "Army and Navy Journal" called it on 18 July 1885 "virtually a new regiment, so much has its personnel changed during the past six months..." The Journal placed the credit squarely on McAlpin's shoulders writing, "Colonel Edwin A. McAlpin, the but recently elected commander, has certainly developed energy, pluck and good sense in the management of his organization, which has, in turn, been followed by most encouraging results..."

In 1895, he was appointed by Governor Levi P. Morton to succeed Thomas H. McGrath as Adjutant General of the State with the rank of Major General. In this role he deployed his units to suppress several disorders in the New York City vicinity, but saw no formal combat. In 1898, he was succeeded by C. Whitney Tillinghast 2nd.

=== Personal life ===
On 27 October 1870, he married Anne Brandreth, daughter of Benjamin Brandreth proprietor of the then-famous “Brandreth Vegetable Universal Pills” from which he had amassed a large fortune. The wedding took place at Trinity Episcopal Church in Ossining and was officiated by Rev. Clarence Buel. Also in that year he was admitted as a partner in his father's firm, the D.H. McAlpin & Co tobacco company.

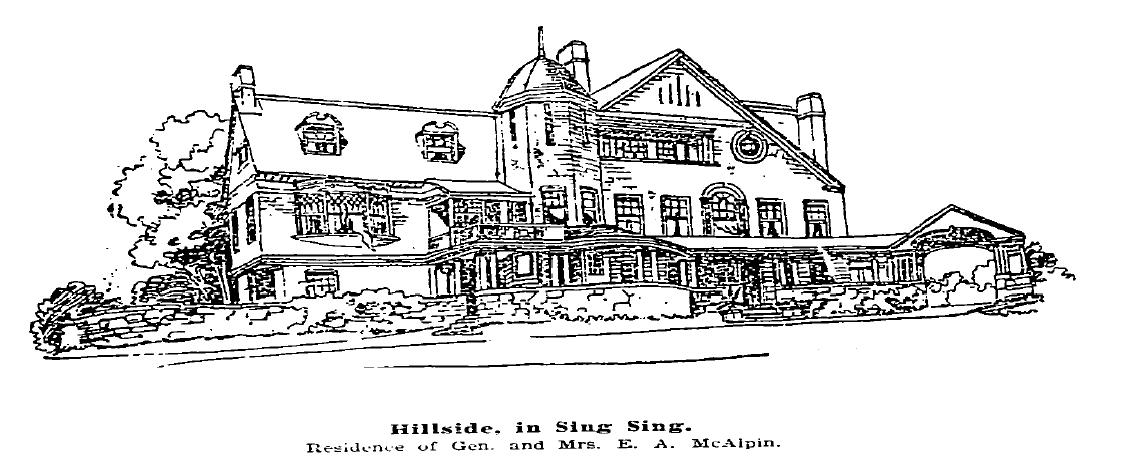
The McAlpin home in Ossining, NY

In 1895 the couple celebrated their silver wedding anniversary at their house in Ossining, NY, dubbed “Hillside House”. As befitted a prominent person at that time, the couple chartered a train to bring guests from New York City and return them at the end of the evening. "Hillside" was reported by The New York Times to be '...one of the show places of the Hudson River section'. Consisting of 27 rooms on a landscaped plot of 6 acres (24,000 m^{2}), the house had 10 baths, large stables, a garage, some greenhouses, and a commanding view of the Hudson River. McAlpin purchased the house in 1883 and his son, Colonel Benjamin Brandreth McAlpin sold it in February 1928 to the Imperial Order Daughters of the Empire who had plans to use the property as a retirement home for members of the British Empire in the area. Victoria Home, as the home was and is known, opened on 24 November 1928, with 22 residents. In January 1932 the Home completed a $92,000 expansion which provided room for a total of 41 residents.

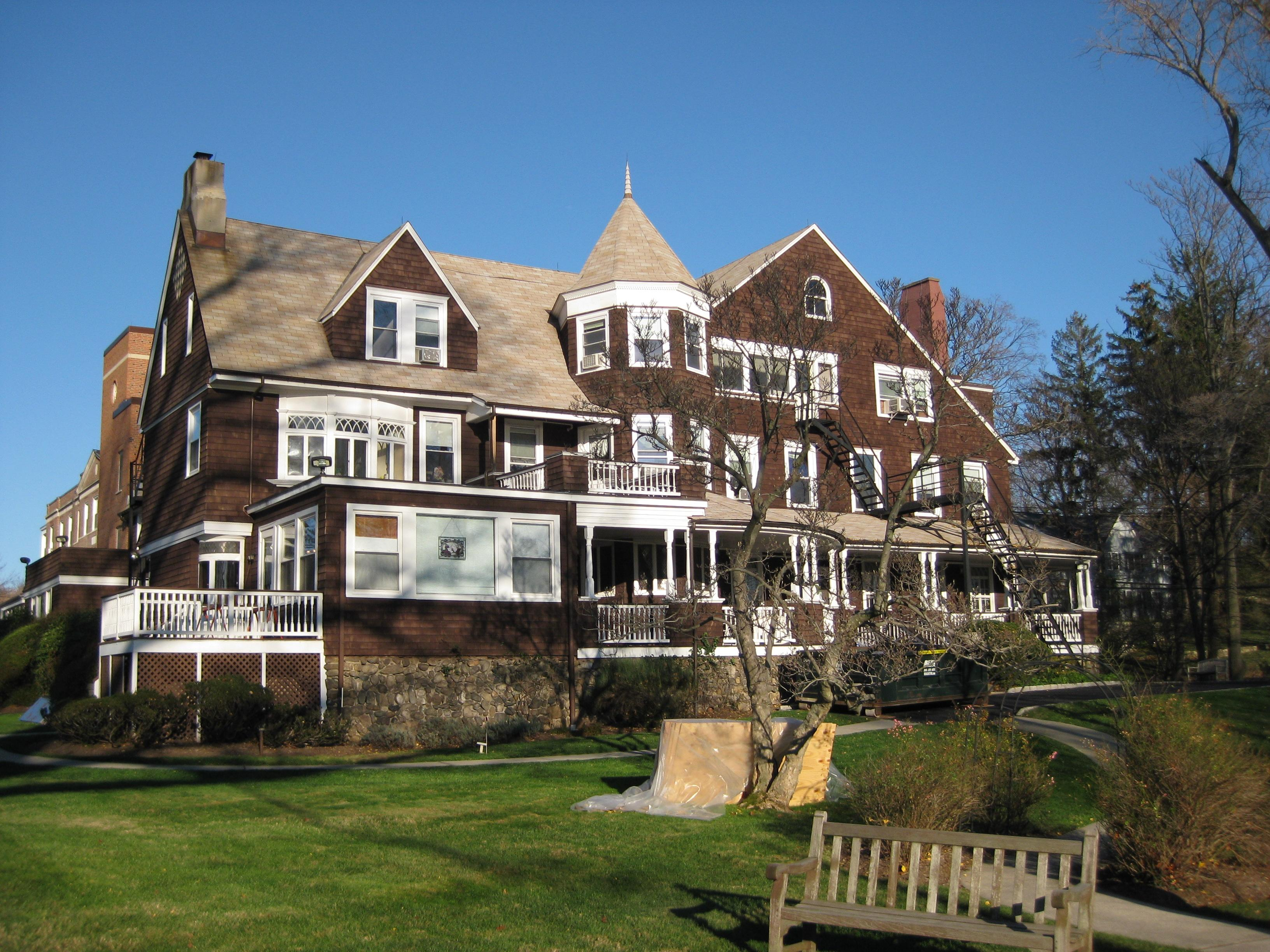
"Victoria Home", a nursing home, formerly General McAlpin's house "Hillside" as it appeared in November 2008

=== Political activities ===
He was an active worker in the Republican Party and ran an unsuccessful campaign for Congress in 1884. For many years he was treasurer of the Republican Campaign Committee. He was a potential vice presidential candidate alongside William McKinley in the 1896 election. From 1889-1892 he was President of the Republican League of New York. He held several local offices in his home at Ossining, including:

- Village trustee from 1886–98,
- Village President 1889
- Postmaster 1889-1893

=== Business life ===
General McAlpin owned several large tracts of real estate in Manhattan, inherited from his father. One tract on 34th Street and Broadway was developed into the Hotel McAlpin. In the lobby of the hotel stood a wooden Indian which once stood outside the family’s tobacco store on Catherine Street in Manhattan; the predecessor to the large tobacco concern which eventually became the D.H. McAlpin & Co. tobacco company.

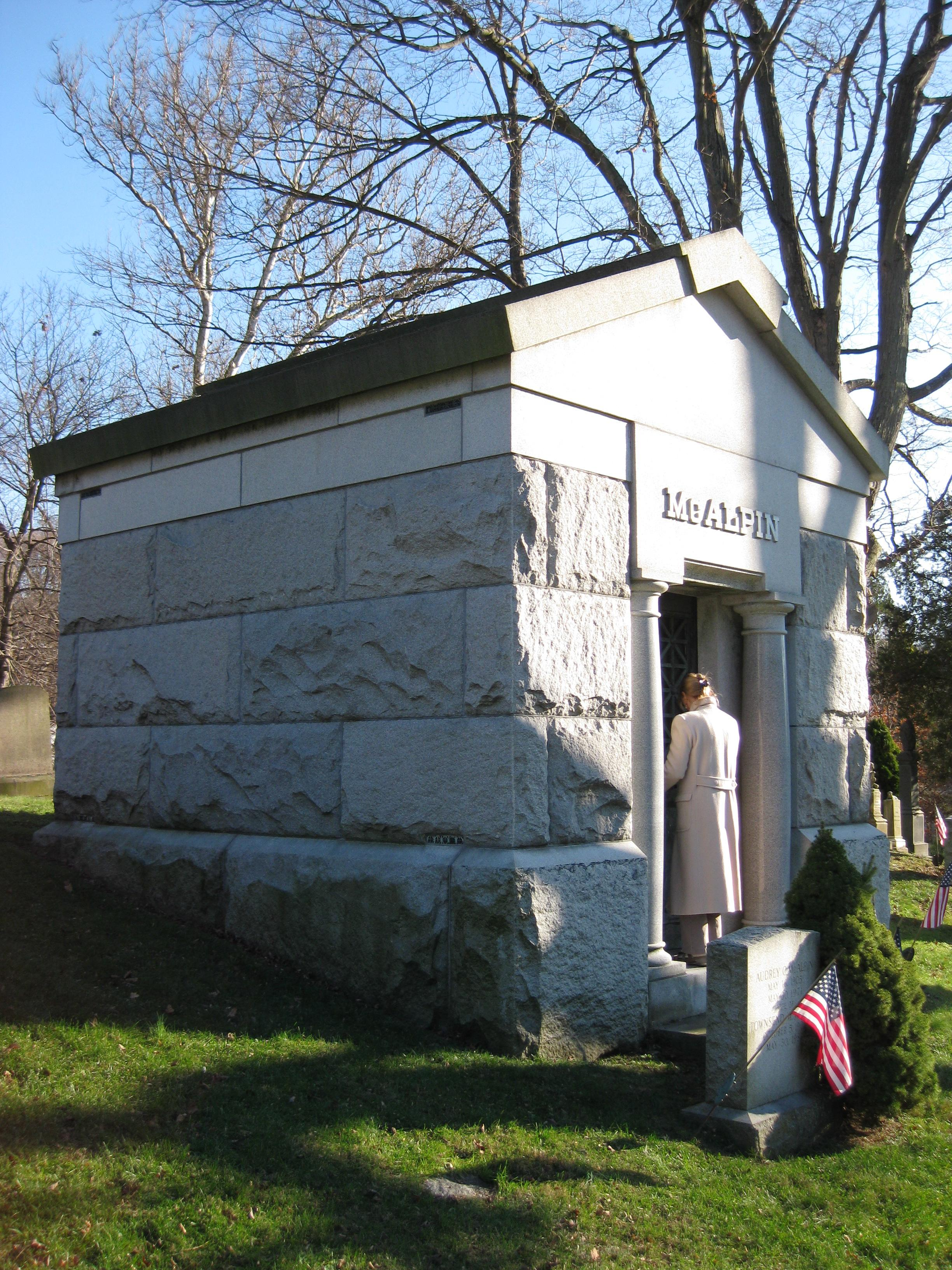
The McAlpin burial vault at Dale Cemetery, Ossining, NY, final resting place of General Mcalpin

McAlpin was active in several businesses during his life including:

- President D.H. McAlpin & Co (tobacco)
- President Manhattan Hotel Co
- Vice-President Eleventh Ward Bank
- Vice-president Standard Gaslight Co of New York
- Director, Mutual Bank
- Director Morton Trust Co.
- Trustee Board of Trade and Transportation
- Member Chamber of Commerce

=== Civic involvement ===
McAlpin was active in a number of civic organizations including:

- President, Ossining Hospital and Dispensary
- President, YMCA
- Trustee First Presbyterian Church in Ossining

On 12 August 1911, Gen. McAlpin was elected President and Chief Scout of the American Boy Scouts, an early Scouting organization.

=== Death and children ===
General McAlpin died at 2pm on 12 April 1917, at his home in Ossining of a cerebral hemorrhage. He is buried at the family vault at the Dale Cemetery in Ossining.

General McAlpin left five sons:

- Colonel Benjamin Brandreth McAlpin
- Reverend Edwin A. McAlpin
- J. Roderick McAlpin
- Kenneth R. McAlpin
- David Hunter McAlpin 2nd
