= Benjamin Brandreth =

British-American businessman and politician (1809–1880)

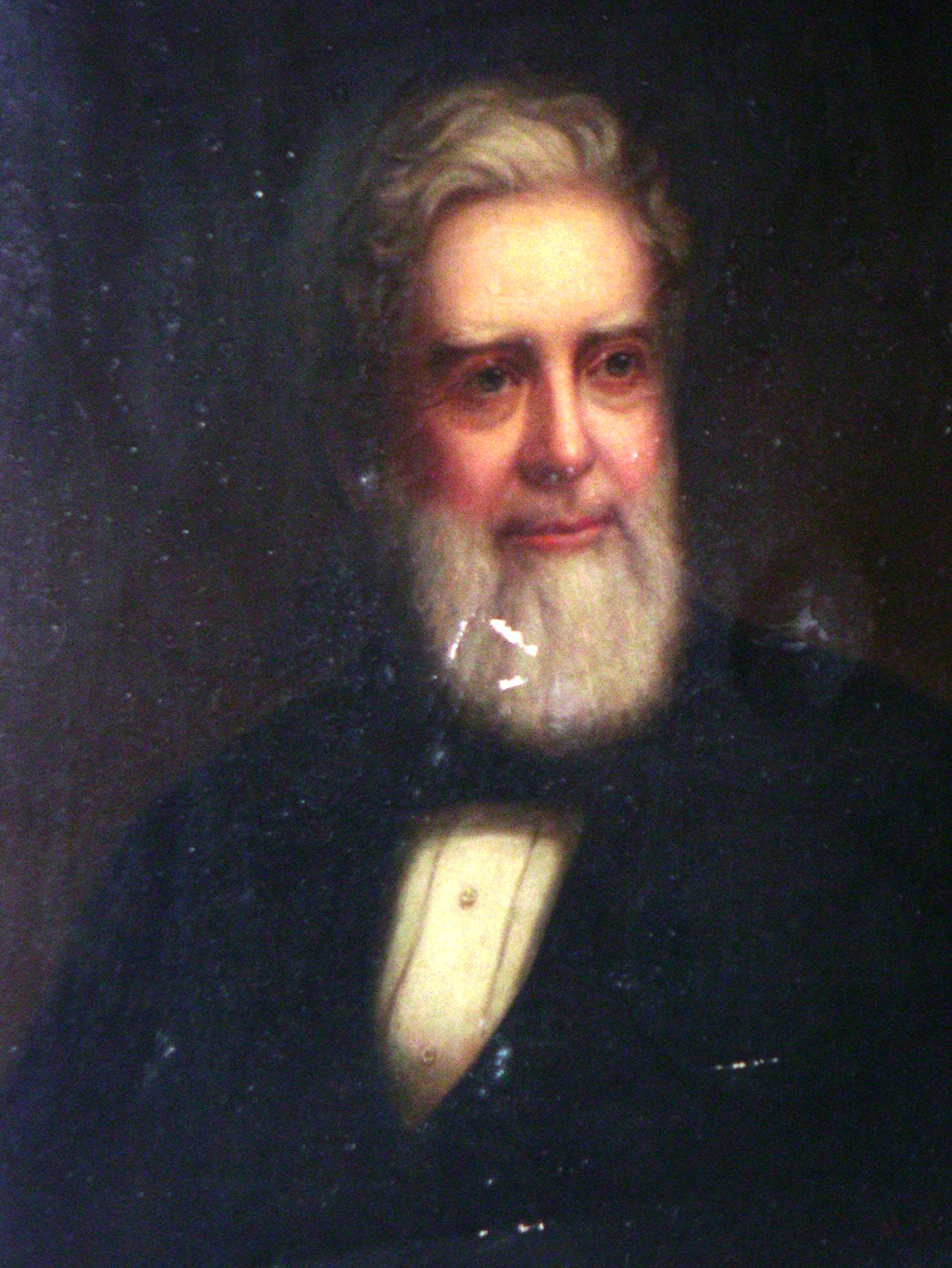
- Portrait of Brandreth, c. 1870

Member of the New York Senate from the 7th district
- In office 1850–1851
- Preceded by: Saxton Smith
- Succeeded by: Abraham Bogart Conger

Member of the New York Senate from the 8th district
- In office 1858–1859
- Preceded by: William Kelly
- Succeeded by: Hezekiah D. Robertson

Personal details
- Born: June 23, 1809 Newtown, Derbyshire, England
- Died: February 18, 1880 (aged 70) Ossining, New York, U.S.
- Resting place: Dale Cemetery, Ossining, New York
- Party: Democratic
- Spouses: Susan Leeds (divorced); Harriet Smallpage (died); Virginia Graham
- Children: 13, including George A. Brandreth
- Relatives: Courtenay Brandreth (grandson); Gyles Brandreth (great-great-great grandson)
- Occupation: Businessman, politician
- Known for: Pioneer of mass pharmaceutical marketing

Benjamin Brandreth (June 23, 1809 – February 18, 1880) was a British-American businessman and politician. He was a 19th-century pioneer in the early use of mass advertising to build consumer awareness of his product, a purgative that allegedly cured many ills by purging toxins out of the blood. He became a successful and wealthy businessman, bank president, and New York State Senator.

== Early life ==
Brandreth was born at Newtown, Derbyshire, on June 23, 1809, the son of William Holmes (1775–1809) and Ann née Brandreth (1785–1877). His father abandoned the family while Benjamin was young, so he was raised by his mother and maternal grandfather William Brandreth (1743–1828), whose surname he adopted.

His cousin was Joseph Brandreth (1748–1815), whose family remained at their ancestral seat in North West England, descending in the senior line via James Watson-Gandy-Brandreth (1908–2008), now being represented by his great-nephew Mark Watson-Gandy.

== Business career ==
=== Brandreth's Pills ===
Brandreth emigrated to the United States in 1835 with his three children shortly after the death of his second wife, Harriet Smallpage, hoping to find a bigger market than he had in England for his "Vegetable Universal Pill" invented by his grandfather, William Brandreth. The formula was a powerful cathartic and played off the popular notion that impurity of the blood was the source of many ills.

Establishing himself on Hudson Street in New York City, Brandreth eventually found success marketing his pills, prompting a move to a larger facility which he built at Sing Sing (later Ossining, New York) in 1836.

Brandreth was a pioneer in using the then-infant technique of mass advertising in building brand awareness to create a mass market for his product. He created and published a wide variety of advertising material for his pills, including a 224-page tome entitled The Doctrine of Purgation, Curiosities from Ancient and Modern Literature, from Hippocrates and Other Medical Writers. His advertising copy had a distinctly literary flavor which found favor with the public. Brandreth widely distributed his books and pamphlets throughout the country as well as taking copious advertising space in newspapers.

Eventually his pills became one of the best-selling patent medicines in the United States. A congressional committee in 1849 reported that Brandreth was the nation's largest proprietary advertiser. Between 1862 and 1863, Brandreth's average annual gross income surpassed $600,000.

For fifty years, Brandreth's name was a household word in the United States. Indeed, the Brandreth pills were so well known they received mention in Edgar Allan Poe's satirical story "Some Words with a Mummy," Herman Melville's classic Moby-Dick, and P. T. Barnum's book The Humbugs of the World.

The Brandreth Pill Factory complex was added to the National Register of Historic Places in 1980.

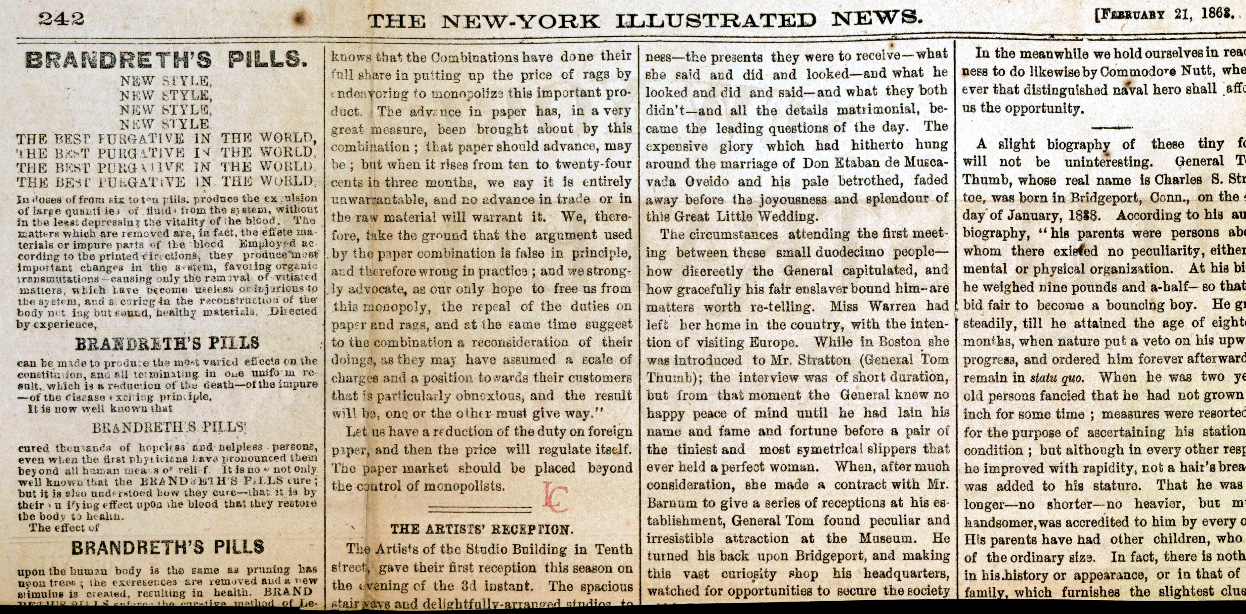
Brandreth Pill advertisement

Although his pills sold well to the public, they were described by medical experts and skeptics as an example of quackery. Brandreth and his pills are mentioned in Dan King's book Quackery Unmasked (1858). Historian James Harvey Young has noted that Brandreth convinced "his dupes to swallow his pills as fast and as rapidly as they would their dinner" and deluded them with "the merest twaddle of medical language that ever made the ignorant gape, or the educated cry 'bah!'"

=== Brandreth's Pill Works and Allcock Manufacturing Company ===
Brandreth's pill company was known as The Brandreth Pill Works, where he established operations at Ossining, New York. In 1848, he bought Allcock's Porous Plaster from founder Thomas Allcock, and the name of the firm eventually changed to Allcock Manufacturing.

After Brandreth's death, control of the firm eventually moved to his great-grandson, Fox Brandreth Conner, who began manufacturing animal traps along with pills and plasters. After a pause in production for World War II, production of the traps resumed and the Havahart brand became a registered trademark. Conner sold the pill and plaster business in the 1960s, thus ending Brandreth's medical legacy, but continued making the Havahart traps.

In 1979, the Havahart trap business was sold to the Woodstream Corporation of Lititz, Pennsylvania, and the remaining property in Ossining was sold to Filex Steel Products Company. The remaining 34 employees at Ossining were offered jobs in Pennsylvania with the new owner, but many retired, thus ending the 142-year legacy of Brandreth's enterprise.

=== Other business interests ===
A prominent businessman, Brandreth was among the original founders and was the first President of the Westchester County Savings Bank in Tarrytown, Westchester County, New York, in 1853.

In 1857, he built the Brandreth Hotel near Canal and Broadway in New York City.

=== Brandreth Park ===
In 1851, Brandreth bought 26,000 acres (110 km^{2}) in the Adirondacks of New York State for 15 cents an acre, establishing the first private preserve in the Adirondack Park becoming known as "Brandreth Park." The park remains in the family's possession today and incorporates a number of cabins and cottages in a preserved wilderness setting.

== Political career ==
Brandreth was a prominent Democrat in Westchester County, New York, representing the district in the New York State Senate in 1850, 1851, 1858, and 1859.

In 1856, he narrowly lost election to the United States Congress to John W. Ferdon. He was an active participant in a number of Democratic State Conventions.

== Civic service ==
Brandreth was active in civic development at Sing Sing (later Ossining, New York). A staunch Episcopalian, he was an early subscriber to the fundraising effort to build Trinity Episcopal Church in Downtown Ossining, later serving as a vestryman.

He was one of the founders of the New York Eclectic Medical College, which he supported financially throughout his life. In 1874, he presented the building used by the college to Dr. Robert S. Newton and his associates.

Brandreth was active in the Masons, who took charge of his funeral with full honors.

== Personal life ==
Brandreth was married three times: first to Susan Leeds, from whom he was divorced a few months after the marriage; second to Harriet Smallpage, to whom he was married seven years until her death; and third to Virginia Graham.

He had three children with his second wife, among them George A. Brandreth, and ten with his third. His children included Colonel Franklin Brandreth (1849–1928), who was the father of the artist Courtenay Brandreth. He was also the grandfather of Fox Conner's wife Virginia Brandreth, and the great-great-great-grandfather of Gyles Brandreth.

== Death ==
Brandreth died on February 18, 1880. That morning he had risen early, reaching the plant with his eldest son at six-thirty. He had worked an hour or so in the mixing room. Then came a stroke of apoplexy and death. Thus, at the end as at the launching of his venture in America, Brandreth was mixing the purgative in which he so fervently believed.

The impact Brandreth had on the local community of Sing Sing was noted by the account in The New York Times, which stated that at the time of his death:

...flags have been hung at half-mast there and on Saturday all the business places of the village, including the bank, Post Office, Soldiers' monument, and several hotels, together with innumerable private dwellings, were draped in mourning.

Brandreth's funeral was held at Trinity Church, which could hold only a fraction of the mourners in attendance. Others lined the streets to Dale Cemetery, where he was buried. His body was in a wrought metal and bronze casket hermetically sealed with a full-length plate glass top. The procession to the cemetery included carriages for the clergymen and pallbearers, the 16th Battalion brass band, the hearse with a bodyguard of eight Masonic knights, and carriages for 150 friends and family, stretching out over a mile in length, so that the first carriages were arriving at the cemetery at about the same time as the last were leaving the church.

New York State Senate
Preceded by Saxton Smith	New York State Senate; 7th District; 1850–1851	Succeeded by Abraham B. Conger
Preceded by William Kelly	New York State Senate; 8th District; 1858–1859	Succeeded by Hezekiah D. Robertson
