= Thomas Allcock =

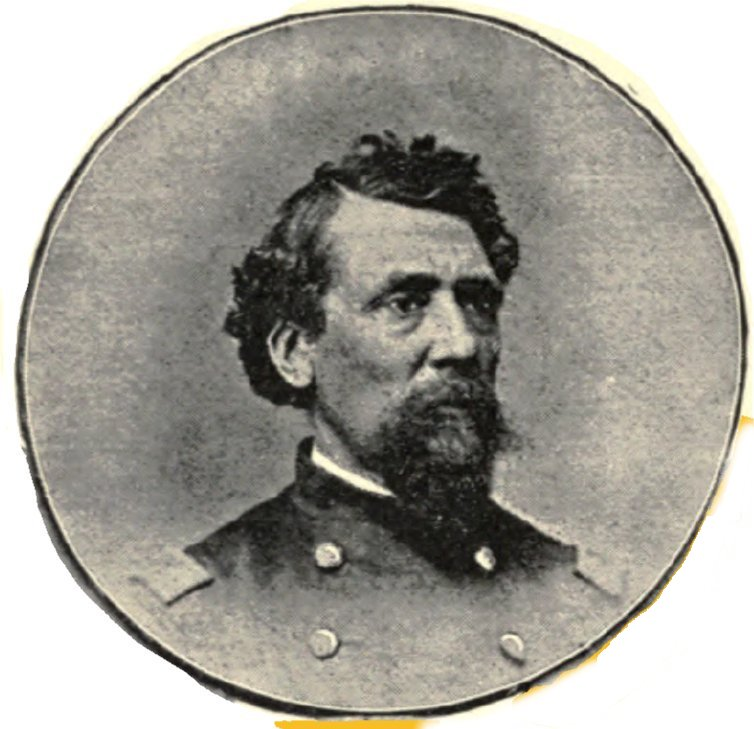
- Thomas Allcock with the 4th New York Heavy Artillery
- Born: 27 January 1815; Birmingham, England
- Died: 28 December 1891 (aged 76); New York City, U.S.
- Burial place: Dale Cemetery; Ossining, New York
- Military career
- Allegiance: United States; Union
- Branch: United States Army; Union Army
- Service years: 1861–1866
- Rank: Lieutenant Colonel; Bvt. Brigadier General
- Unit: 4th New York Heavy Artillery Regiment
- Conflicts: See list: American Civil War; Peninsula campaign; Battle of Hanover Court House; Overland Campaign; Battle of the Wilderness; Battle of Spotsylvania; Battle of North Anna; Battle of Totopotomoy Creek; Battle of Cold Harbor; Siege of Petersburg; First Battle of Deep Bottom; Second Battle of Deep Bottom; First Battle of Ream's Station (WIA)
- Other work: inventor, founder of the Allcock Manufacturing Company

Thomas Allcock (1815–1891) was the inventor of a plaster for pain relief, the founder of the Allcock Manufacturing Company and an artillery officer in the Union Army during the American Civil War. He was one of the military judges in the trial of Henry Wirz.

== Early life ==
Allcock was born and educated in Birmingham, England. At age 15, he studied and practiced chemistry. Allcock emigrated to the United States in 1845, settled in New York and opened a small drug store under the Astor House. In 1854, he invented a porous plaster for the relief of pain, the sale of which made an appreciable increase in his income. Subsequently formed Allcock Manufacturing.

== Military career ==
Allcock joined the New York State Militia, and was appointed Captain on 27 October 1856 with the Second Brigade, a post he held until the outbreak of the American Civil War. Allcock was made Assistant Adjutant General on 13 April 1861, headquartered in the New York Depot. On January 4, 1862, he mustered with the 4th New York Heavy Artillery as major.

Allcock was engaged in the battles of the Wilderness, Spotsylvania, North Anna, Totopotomoy, Hanover Court House, Cold Harbor, Petersburg, first and second Deep Bottom, Weldon Railroad, and Ream's Station. Allcock was wounded while in command of the Third Battalion at the First Battle of Ream's Station on 25 August 1864, for which he was appointed brevet colonel. Allcock was on detached duty as an invalid from September 1864 to December 2, 1865 when he was discharged due to the end of the war.

On February 21, 1866, President Andrew Johnson nominated Allcock to the grade of brevet brigadier general of volunteers, to rank from March 13, 1865, and the United States Senate confirmed the nomination on April 10, 1866. Allcock returned to New York after the war and joined up with Benjamin Brandreth in the manufacturing and sale of popular patent medicines.

== Death ==
Thomas Allcock died on 27 December 1891, in New York City, of a stroke. He was buried at Dale Cemetery in Ossining, New York. He was survived by two sons and two daughters.
