= Dan King (skeptic) =

American physician and skeptical writer (1791–1864)

- Born: 1791; Mansfield, Connecticut
- Died: 1864 (aged 72–73)
- Occupation: Medical doctor

Dan King (1791–1864) was an American medical doctor and early skeptical writer.

King was born in Mansfield, Connecticut. He practiced medicine in Rhode Island and Massachusetts until his retirement in 1859. King is most notable for his book Quackery Unmasked (1858) which heavily criticized homeopathy and other alternative medicine claims.

He was also critical of the use of tobacco and published a book on its negative health effects.

== Publications ==
- Spiritualism, an address to the Bristol County Medical Society (1857)
- Quackery Unmasked (1858)
- The life and times of Thomas Wilson Dorr, with outlines of the political history of Rhode Island (1859)
- Tobacco: What It Is, and What It Does (1861)
