= Laughton Osborn =

American poet and playwright

- Born: 1809 New York, New York U.S.
- Died: December 12 1878 (aged 69) New York, New York, U.S.
- Resting place: Green-Wood Cemetery, Brooklyn, New York, U.S.
- Education: Columbia College (1827)
- Occupations: Poet; playwright; novelist
- Writing career
- Pen name: Charles Erskine White, D.D.
- Years active: 1828–1873

Laughton Osborn (1809–December 12 1878) was an American poet, playwright, novelist, artist, and musician. He was born in New York City to parents, Samuel and Ann Osborn, and in 1827, graduated from Columbia College. He used the alias Charles Erskine White, D.D.

Most notable today as a fan and correspondent of Edgar Allan Poe, Osborn wrote to him about his loneliness and lack of sympathy from his mother. One day, upon reading an issue of Broadway Journal that he had retrieved from Poe's lodging, he found a negative review of his poem, The Vision of Rubeta. Having been published anonymously, Osborn was grieved with Poe for publishing, rather than writing it, since at the time, Poe was an editor, rather than owner, for the magazine. But Poe reconciled their relationship through a letter, saying the review had passed by him without him ever seeing or knowing of it.

In a letter dated August 15, 1845, Poe wrote to Osborn revealing he did not know Osborn's Confessions of a Poet had been written by him and not John Neal, as was popularly believed at the time. In Poe's The Literati of New York City, he publicly cleared the confusion writing, it "was in two volumes, of the ordinary novel form, but printed very openly. It made much noise in the literary world, and no little curiosity was excited in regard to its author, who was generally supposed to be John Neal." Poe's reasoning behind the confusion centers on it resembling the "boldness and vigour" of Neal's novels, Seventy-Six and Errata. But it may, in part, also have to do with Osborn never having published anything under his own name, as Poe states in The Literati of New York City: "I am not sure that he has published anything with his own name."

In the same article, Poe praised Confessions for being "original" and "artistic". He elevated it above the works of Neal, whose works, according to him, were dissatisfactory. However, when newspapers negatively reviewed it, Osborn retaliated with the publication of his satirical poem, The Visions of Rubeta. "[B]itter" and "personal", it leveled the views on Osborn as a writer, but still garnered its own critics. Overall, Poe favored him as a creative, claiming he had "succeeded" as a "poet, painter, and musician", but didn't fail to mention that he laughs "not so much at the objects of his satire", but at Osborn himself for "getting into so great a passion."

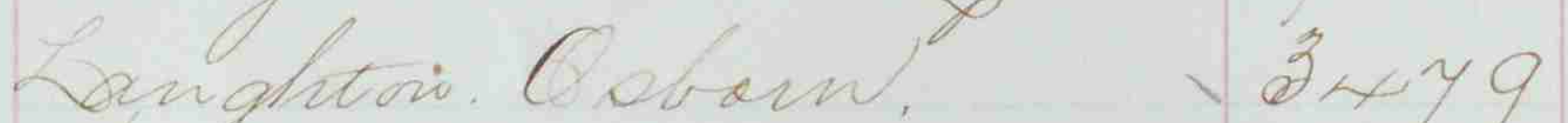
Osborn lot number, 3479 at Green-Wood Cemetery

After his death on December 12, 1878, Osborn was buried at Green-Wood Cemetery on the 14th. According to their registry, he was 69-years and two months old at the time of his death, and was undertaken by J V Cantrell. His last known residence was 8 East 15th St. New York.

== Life, family and education ==
Laughton Osborn was born in New York, New York in 1809. (Although James Grant Wilson in his book, Bryant, And His Friends: Some Reminisces of the Knickerbocker Writers cites 1808) The son of Ann and the, at the time, prominent physician, Samuel Osborn, he grew up in a wealthy household where he presumably learned Italian and French. He graduated from Columbia College in 1827, and around 1831, one of his sisters died, imbuing into him a "latent eccentricity." Attributed by Wilson, a classmate of his said he was "studious and popular," and impressed people with Sixty Years of the Life of Jeremy Levis.

In later life, he seemed to have avoided most people, being judged as a recluse. When returning to New York after a year traveling abroad, he lived "nearly half a century in retirement", focusing on his writings and feuds with publishers and critics. If it were not for his "madness," Wilson wrote he would have "excelled" many writers of his time.

He is undoubtedly one of "Nature's own noblemen," full of generosity, courage, honour — chivalrous in every respect, but, unhappily, carrying his ideas of chivalry, or rather of independence, to the point of Quixotism, if not of absolute insanity. He has no doubt been misapprehended, and therefore wronged by the world; but he should not fail to remember that the source of the wrong lay in his own idiosyncrasy — one altogether unintelligible and unappreciable by the mass of mankind.

— Edgar Allan Poe, The Literati of New York, No. II, May 1846

== Genres ==
Osborn wrote on a wide variety of subjects, such as art and painting, tragedies, satires, sea voyages, and what is known as science fiction today. His 1868 novel, Travels by Sea and Land of Alethitheras, delves into lost civilizations, races, and worlds.

His dramatic works often spotlight philosophical, moral, and existential themes, focusing on the psychology of characters. These, today, are most commonly, if only, bundled together in volumes instead of individual pieces.

His satirical side is most prominently seen in The Visions of Rebueta where he lampoons Colonel Stone and others after the negative reviews on Confessions.

== Bibliography ==
- The Adventures of Jeremy Levis, by Himself (1828)
- The Dream of Alla-Ad-Deen, from the romance of 'Anastasia', by Charles Erskine White, D.D. (18??)
- The Death of General Pike (18??)
- Sixty Years of the Life of Jeremy Levis (1831)
- The Confessions of a Poet, by Himself (1835)
- The Vision of Rubeta (1838)
- Five Points (1838)
- Arthur Carryl (1841)
- Handbook of Young Artists and Amateurs in Oil Painting (1845 or 1849)
- The Silver Head, the Double Deceit: Comedies (1867)
- Calvary—Virginia: Tragedies (1867)
- Alice, or the Painter's Story (1867)
- Bianca Capello: A Tragedy (1868)
- Travels by Sea and Land of Alethitheras (1868)
- The Montanini; The School for Critics (1868)
- Ugo Da Este—Uberto—The Cid of Seville: Tragedies (1869)
- The Magnetiser, the Prodigal: Comedies in Prose (1869)
- The Last Mandeville, The Heart's Sacrifice, The Monk, Matilda of Denmark (1870)
- Meleagros, the New Cavalry: Tragedies (1871)
- Mariamne: Being The Third Of The Tragedies Of Jewish And Biblical History (1873)
