= Abraham Bogart Conger =

American farmer, lawyer, and politician (1814–1887)

Abraham B. Conger

Member of the New York Senate from the 7th district
- In office 1852–1853
- Preceded by: Benjamin Brandreth
- Succeeded by: William H. Robertson

Personal details
- Born: July 5, 1814 New York City, New York, U.S.
- Died: May 24, 1887 (aged 72) New York City, New York, U.S.
- Resting place: Green-Wood Cemetery, Brooklyn
- Party: Democratic
- Spouse: Mary Rutgers McCrea Hedges (m. 1836; died 1884)
- Children: 13
- Education: Columbia University (B.A. 1831, M.A. 1834)
- Occupation: Farmer, lawyer, politician

Abraham Bogart Conger (July 5, 1814 – May 24, 1887) was an American farmer, lawyer, and politician from New York. He served in the New York State Senate from 1852 to 1853 and was a delegate to the 1864 Democratic National Convention and the 1867–1868 New York State Constitutional Convention.

== Early life and education ==
Conger was born on July 5, 1814, in New York City, New York, the son of John Smith Conger and Sarah Bogart.

In 1830, Conger was an assistant instructor in the Columbia Grammar School English and Mathematical Departments. In 1831, he was an instructor in the Classical Departments.

He graduated from Columbia University with a B.A. in 1831 and an M.A. in 1834.

== Career ==
Conger was a lawyer, but he preferred to farm and raise livestock. In 1840, he moved with his family to Rockland County. He named his residence Waldberg, which in time became the name of the surrounding area. He helped develop the area, donated land for the school and the West Shore Railroad station, and was involved in the church. Waldberg was later renamed Congers in his honor.

=== State Senate ===
In 1851, Conger was elected to the New York State Senate as a Democrat, representing the 7th District (Westchester County, Rockland County, and Putnam County). He served in the Senate in 1852 and 1853.

=== Later political activities ===
Conger was a delegate to the 1864 Democratic National Convention and the 1867–1868 New York State Constitutional Convention.

He was also president of the Rockland Female Institute board of trustees, the Rockland County Bible Institute, and the New York State Agricultural Society.

In 1867, he investigated rinderpest, which was devastating herds in New York at the time, and his report on it contributed to its eradication in the state.

== Personal life ==
In 1836, Conger married Mary Rutgers McCrea Hedges (1819–1884). Their children were:

- Katherine Rutgers (1837–infant) - Henry Rutgers (1842–1856) - Arthur Bogart (1843–1844) - Katherine Rutgers (1844–1926, wife of Alonzo Lane) - Theodore Hedges (1846–?, husband of Anna Lynch) - Wilhelmina Bogart (1848–?, wife of Samuel Blatchford) - Clarence Rapelje (1851–1911, husband of Margaret Lynch) - Mary McCrea (1853–1876, wife of Henry Smyth) - Arthur Bloomfield (1854–1920, husband of Mary Stockton) - Anna Hedges (1856–1857) - Herbert Trowbridge (1857–?, husband of Eliza Victoria) - Helen DePeyster (1859–?) - Laura Van Horn (1861–1861)

=== Financial troubles and divorce ===
In the Panic of 1873, Conger lost his fortune and was heavily in debt from cattle speculation. His sons attributed his financial misfortunes to a fall he suffered off a wagon. He still had access to his wife's inherited estate, but the family tried to secure it from him by having his wife divorce him in 1875–1877. They claimed he had an affair with Margaret Northrup, wife of Reverend George Egbert Northrup, the minister of the Waldberg Presbyterian Church. It was charged that the Reverend was fully aware of the affair, and the family had to leave the county due to public pressure, which might have led to the foreclosure on the church's mortgage in 1876.

Conger resided at Grassy Point at some point, and after the divorce he moved to New York City, where he spent the rest of his life.

== Death ==
Conger died at his home on May 24, 1887. His funeral was held at the Church of the Strangers. He was buried in the family vault in Green-Wood Cemetery in Brooklyn.

New York State Senate
Preceded by Benjamin Brandreth	New York State Senate; 7th District; 1852–1853	Succeeded by William H. Robertson
