= Harvey Milk High School =

Public school in New York City

Coordinates: 40.730056°N 73.992748°W

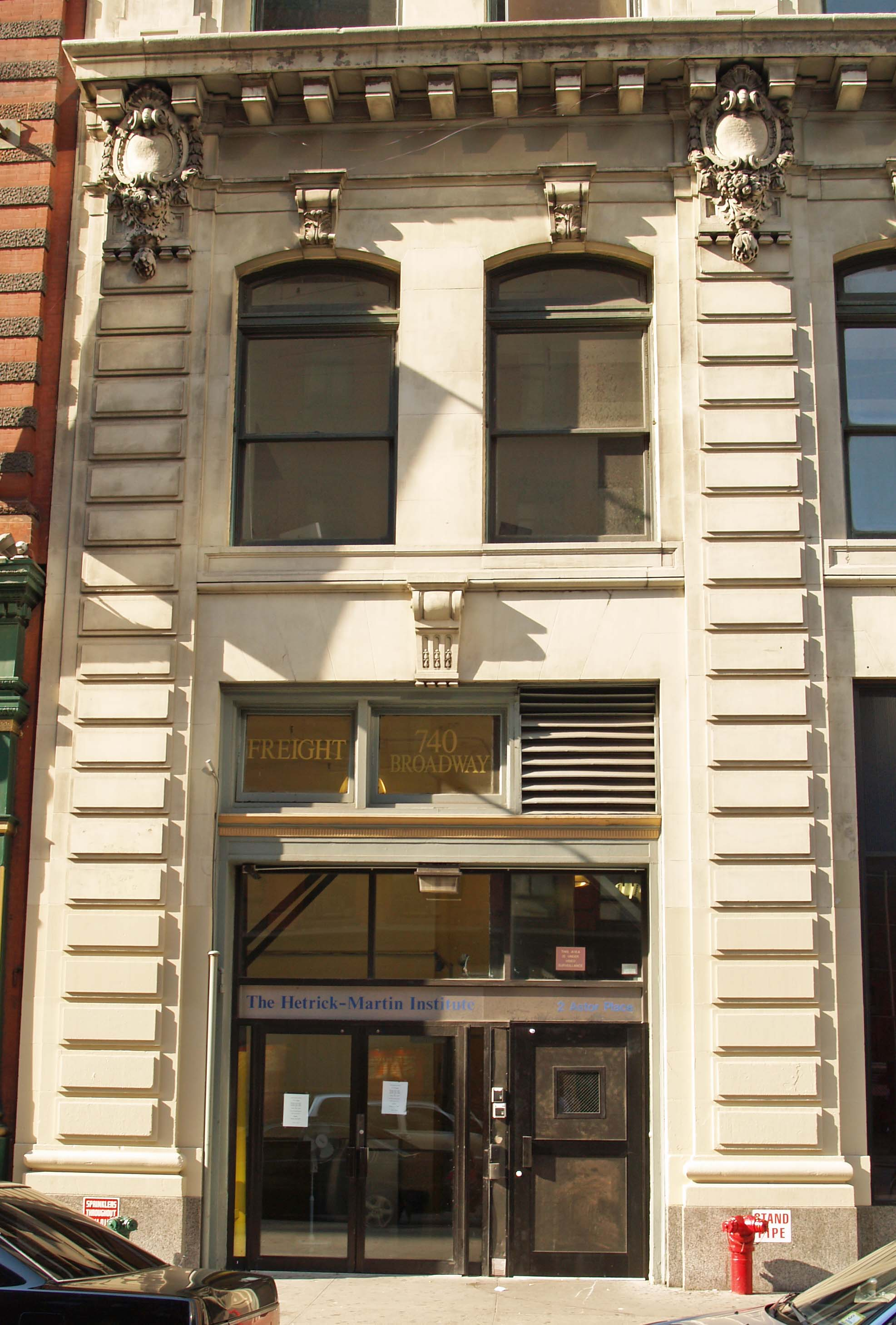

Location
- 2–10 Astor Place; New York, New York; United States

Information
- Type: Public high school
- Established: 1985
- Founder: Emery S. Hetrick and Damien Martin
- Principal: Mark Jabir
- Grades: 9-12
- Enrollment: 110 students
- Campus type: Urban
- Affiliations: New York City Department of Education and Hetrick-Martin Institute
- Website: https://www.hmhsnyc.org/

Harvey Milk High School (HMHS) is a public high school in the East Village of Lower Manhattan in New York City designed for, though not limited to, gay, lesbian, bisexual, and transgender young people, as well as those questioning their sexuality and gender identity. It is named after San Francisco, California, supervisor Harvey Milk, the first openly gay man to be elected to a public office in the United States.

== History ==
=== Founding ===
The school was founded in 1985 by the Hetrick-Martin Institute (HMI), which was then known as the Institute for the Protection of Lesbian and Gay Youth. The small program of a little over a dozen students was originally located in the Washington Square United Methodist Church and was run in collaboration with the New York City Board of Education. HMHS was created as an alternative education program for youth who find it difficult or impossible to attend their home schools due to threats, violence, or harassment.

In 2003, HMHS became a fully accredited public school administered by the New York City Department of Education, separate from HMI. The school and the non-profit still share space in the same building, with HMI providing a majority of the school's arts and culture programming.

=== Expansion and controversy ===
HMHS came to national attention in 2002, when the Board of Education authorized a $3.2 million capital expansion of the school as one of its last acts prior to becoming a mayoral agency.

The capital provided by the Board of Education allowed for the renovation of the school building. Enrollment jumped from 50 to 100 students. In 2003, William Salzman, the principal of the school, said it would be "academically challenging". Michael Long, chairman of the Conservative Party of New York State, was critical, and asked: "Is there a different way to teach homosexuals? Is there gay math? This is wrong...There's no reason these children should be treated separately."

Supporters contend that this school is a pragmatic solution, providing an alternative path to a diploma for students who are unable to succeed in a mainstream high school due to intolerance. Not all arguments against the school are divided along partisan lines. Independent mayor Michael Bloomberg supported the renovation of the school while Democratic N.Y. State Senator Rubén Díaz opposed it.

In 2004, the HMHS underwent a 17,000 square foot (1,600 m²) expansion and an increase to eight classrooms and 110 students.

== Support from Hedwig and the Angry Inch ==
In 2015, the producers of the Broadway musical Hedwig and the Angry Inch donated over $600,000 from ticket sales to HMI, making it its biggest donation from an organization. Prior to this the musical production has contributed portions of their CD sales of "Wig In A Box: Songs From and Inspired by Hedwig and The Angry Inch" starting in 2003, followed by their film entitled "Follow My Voice," a documentary of Harvey Milk High School and the making of the CD album in 2006.

== See also ==
- Education in New York City
- LGBTQ culture in New York City
- EAGLES Academy
- Walt Whitman Community School
- Harvey Milk Day
