= Standard Gas Light Company =

Defunct American public utility company

Standard Gas Light Company was a New York City public utility which had its primary office at 173 Broadway, in 1890. The business maintained two branch offices at the southeast corner of Lexington Avenue and 42nd Street and 19 and 21 West 125th Street. The branch offices served the Madison Square district and the Harlem district respectively.

== History of corporation; takeover by competitor ==
In December 1896 the firm reported that the annual aggregate loss of New York City gas companies due to bad debts amounted to $500,000. By the fall of 1898 the East River Gas Light Company began to encroach on the business of the Standard Gas Light Company in Harlem. Standard Gas Light Company attempted to sell gas for as little as .40 per thousand feet, but was unable to operate without a loss.

In 1900 the Consolidated Gas Company cut the price it sold gas to consumers to .65 per thousand feet. Its ability to maintain this rate while paying its operating expenses and keeping its equipment in prime efficiency, gave it an advantage over its competitors. During the first years of the 20th century it absorbed its rivals, including the Standard Gas Light Company.

In 1906 the Standard Gas Light Company filed a suit in the United States Circuit Court attempting to prevent state officers from enforcing the .80 gas law. The utility contended that if it were compelled to furnish gas to its customers at .80, it would realize a profit of only 14.5 cents per thousand feet.
