= William Kelly (New York state senator) =

American politician (1807–1872)

Member of the New York State Senate from the 8th district
- In office January 1, 1856 – December 31, 1857
- Preceded by: Robert A. Barnard
- Succeeded by: Benjamin Brandreth

President of the New York State Agricultural Society
- In office 1854

Personal details
- Born: February 4, 1807; New York City, U.S.
- Died: January 14, 1872 (aged 64); Torquay, Devon, England
- Political party: Democratic
- Spouse: Elizabeth Parr (m. 1843)
- Parent: Robert Kelly (father)
- Profession: Politician, merchant

William Kelly (February 4, 1807, in New York City – January 14, 1872, in Torquay, Devon, England) was an American merchant and politician from New York.

== Life ==
He was the son of Robert Kelly (died 1825) who came to New York City from Ireland in 1796, and became a prosperous merchant. William and his brothers John and Robert (1808–1856) also became merchants. John died in 1836, and the next year William and Robert retired with ample fortunes.

In April 1843, he married his step-sister Elizabeth Parr (Elizabeth's mother had been his father's second wife).

He was President of the New York State Agricultural Society in 1854, and a member of the New York State Senate (8th D.) in 1856 and 1857.

At the New York state election, 1860, he ran on the Douglas Democratic ticket for Governor of New York but was defeated by the Republican incumbent Edwin D. Morgan.

He was a trustee of Vassar College; and of the University of Rochester.

== Ellerslie ==
In 1750, the "Ellerslie," land in Rhinebeck, Dutchess County, New York, was the farm of Hendricus Heermance. His daughter, Clartjen, married Jacobus Kip. The farm passed to the Kips by inheritance, and was in 1814 sold to Maturin Livingston, son-in-law of Gov. Morgan Lewis. Livingston built a mansion on it, and in 1816 sold the property to James Thompson, who named the estate "Ellerslie." In 1841, it was sold to William Kelly, who increased the acreage to nearly eight hundred, and greatly beautified the estate. Kelly engaged in agricultural and philanthropic pursuits. The estate subsequently came into the possession of Gov. Levi P. Morton.

== Sources ==
- The New York Civil List compiled by Franklin Benjamin Hough (pages 137 and 142; Weed, Parsons and Co., 1858)
- Pen and Ink Portraits of the Senators, Assemblymen, and State Officers of New York by G. W. Bungay (1857; pg. 61)
- DIED; ...KELLY in NYT on April 25, 1872
- Rhinebeck's Historic Architecture by Nancy V. Kelly (pg. 74)
- The Baptist Encyclopedia by William Cathcart (Vol. 2; pg. 644)

Party political offices
Preceded by Amasa J. Parker	Democratic nominee for Governor of New York; 1860	Succeeded by Horatio Seymour
New York State Senate
Preceded by Robert A. Barnard	New York State Senate; 8th District; 1856–1857	Succeeded by Benjamin Brandreth
