= A. Damien Martin =

American psychiatrist (1933–1991)

A. Damien Martin (December 2, 1933 – August 15, 1991) was one of the founders of the Hetrick-Martin Institute (HMI), originally known as the Institute for the Protection of Lesbian and Gay Youth (IPLGY). The Hetrick-Martin Institute (HMI) founded the Harvey Milk High School in New York City. Martin was a psychiatrist and taught speech pathology at the NYU School of Education.

Martin was a member of the Governor's Task Force on Teenage Suicide, Child Welfare League of America, The New York City Task Force on AIDS, and the NYC Board of Education Multicultural Advisory Committee.

== Personal life ==
Martin was born in December, 1933, in Philadelphia. He and Emery Hetrick were partners at HMI as well as life partners. They were together since 1975, lived together in Manhattan's Upper East Side, and were buried next to each other in Brooklyn at the Green-Wood Cemetery.

Martin died on August 15, 1991, in his home in New York City of AIDS related complications at the age of 57. He was buried on August 19, 1991, in section 95 of the Green-Wood Cemetery.

== Honors and awards ==
Both Martin and Hetrick were named Icons for LGBT History Month.
