= Thomas H. McGrath =

Adjutant General of New York (1840–1922)

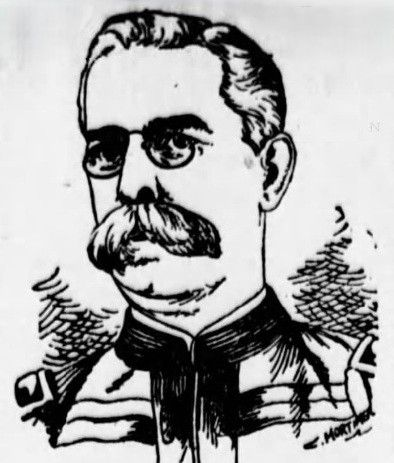
- The World (New York, New York), 20 December 1894
- Born: 25 November 1840; Manhattan, New York, US
- Died: 6 May 1922 (aged 81); Brooklyn, New York, US
- Burial place: Green-Wood Cemetery, Brooklyn, New York, US
- Spouse: Maria Adriana Bergen (m. 1868–1922)
- Children: 4
- Military career
- Allegiance: Union (American Civil War); United States (National Guard)
- Service: US Army Infantry Branch
- Service years: 1861–1895
- Rank: Major General
- Units: 13th Regiment, New York National Guard
- Commands: Company A, 13th Regiment, New York National Guard; Inspector General of the New York National Guard; Adjutant General of New York
- Wars: American Civil War
- Other work: Dry goods wholesaler Member, Consolidated Stock Exchange of New York

Thomas H. McGrath (25 November 1840 – 6 May 1922) was an American merchant and National Guard officer from Brooklyn who served as Adjutant General of New York from 1894 to 1895. (Note: McGrath's gravestone indicates his birthdate was 25 November 1840. The records of Manhattan's Seventh Presbyterian Church give the date of his birth as 25 October 1840.)

== Early life ==
Thomas Hunt McGrath was born in Manhattan on 25 November 1840, a son of Michael McGrath and Electa (Barker) McGrath. He was raised and educated in Manhattan and Brooklyn and followed his father into the wholesale dry goods business. A Democrat who supported the Union, in 1861, McGrath enlisted in the New York Militia for the American Civil War, joining Company E, 13th Regiment, which was commanded by John B. Woodward.

In 1862, the 13th Regiment performed garrison duties at Fort McHenry, Maryland and in Suffolk, Virginia. In 1863, the regiment was activated again in July 1863, and performed garrison duties in Harrisburg, Pennsylvania during the Battle of Gettysburg and responded to the New York City draft riots. McGrath enlisted as a private in November 1861, and was promoted to corporal in May 1862, sergeant in June 1863, and first sergeant in June 1864.

== Continued career ==
After the war, McGrath continued his military service and received his commission as a second lieutenant of the 13th Regiment in October 1865. He received promotion to first lieutenant in February 1868 and captain in September 1873. McGrath resigned his commission and command of the 13th Regiment's Company A and was discharged in February 1874. His absence from the military was brief; in June 1875, he was commissioned as a major and assigned to the inspector general's department at the militia's state headquarters. He was promoted to lieutenant colonel in June 1879 and resigned his commission in March 1880. McGrath also served in local office including member of Brooklyn's board of education.

McGrath returned to military service once again in 1883, again commissioned as a lieutenant colonel in the inspector general's department. In February 1884, he was promoted to colonel and assistant as the reorganized National Guard's assistant inspector general. In January 1892, he was promoted to brigadier general and assigned as inspector general. In December 1894, McGrath was appointed to succeed Josiah Porter as Adjutant General of New York. He was promoted to major general and served until January 1895, when he was succeeded by Edwin A. McAlpin.

== Later career ==
After leaving the adjutant general's post, McGrath's business activities included membership on the Consolidated Stock Exchange of New York, including terms as chairman. In addition, he served as president of the South Brooklyn and Flatbush Railroad, an elevated railway.

During World War I, McGrath volunteered for military service; since he was in his late 70s, he was not recalled. However he did serve voluntarily as reviewing officer for several New York City-area units when they assembled for promotion and award ceremonies, including the 13th Coast Defense Command. He died in Brooklyn on 6 May 1922. He was buried at Green-Wood Cemetery in Brooklyn.
