= Hetrick-Martin Institute =

US non-profit organization for LGBTQ youth

Coordinates: 40.730056°N 73.992748°W

The Hetrick-Martin Institute (HMI) is a US non-profit organization devoted to serving the needs of lesbian, gay, bisexual, transgender, or queer (LGBTQ) youth between the ages of 13 and 24, and their families.

== History ==
It was founded in 1979 by Emery Hetrick and A. Damien Martin as the Institute for the Protection of Lesbian and Gay Youth as a response to the needs of vulnerable and at risk LGBT youth in New York City. Following a private donation in 1983, matched by a grant from the New York State Division for Youth they were able to open an office, provide a drop-in centre and significantly expand their provision of LGBT youth counseling.

In 1985, with funding from the New York City Department of Education, HMI established the Harvey Milk High School, the first high school in the United States that specifically catered to LGBT students. HMI directly managed the school until 2002/3, when it became a fully accredited public school managed by the New York Department of Education. Both the institute and the school still operate out a joint location on Astor Place in Manhattan.

In December 1988, following the death of Emery Hetrick in 1987 from AIDS related complications, Damien Martin was interviewed by Eric Marcus, as part of what would become his book and subsequently a podcast Making Gay History, where he recounted his relationship and work founding what was, by then, renamed the Hetrick-Martin Institute in his and his deceased partners honour. Damien Martin died in 1991, also of AIDS related complications.

== Expansion ==
In 2011, the HMI expanded its services from Manhattan by launching HMI: Newark, a pilot program to serve LGBTQ youth in Newark, New Jersey. Following the success of the pilot programme in July 2014, Ashawnda Fleming was appointed executive director of HMI: Newark. The program has been subsequently expanded to include four counties in New Jersey and renamed HMI: New Jersey.
