= Peoples Westchester Savings Bank =

American bank

Peoples Westchester Savings Bank was a bank based in Hawthorne, New York. On December 30, 1993, First Fidelity Bancorp acquired Peoples Westchester. As of the date of acquisition, Peoples Westchester had 31 branches throughout Westchester County, New York.

== History ==
- July 21, 1853 - Chartered by New York State as Westchester County Savings Bank
- April 30, 1971 - Acquired the Bank For Savings of Westchester
- January 1, 1975 - Acquired Tuckahoe Savings and Loan Association
- August 1, 1977 - Acquired Peoples Savings Bank of New York and renamed to Peoples Westchester County Savings Bank
- March 1, 1978 - Renamed to Peoples Westchester Savings Bank
- September 1, 1979 - Acquired Westchester County Savings and Loan Association
- January 1, 1982 - Acquired Peekskill Savings Bank and Greenburgh Savings Bank
- December 30, 1993 - Acquired by Federal First Fidelity Bank, N.A., New York
