= Brandreth Park =

Forest preserve in the Adirondacks region of New York State, United States

Coordinates: 43.934262°N 74.711809°W

Brandreth Park is the oldest family-owned forest preserve in the state of New York.

== Description ==
In 1851 Dr. Benjamin Brandreth, having made a fortune with his "Brandreth's Universal Vegetable Pills", bought Township 39 in Hamilton County of upstate New York, consisting of 24,000 acres (97 km^{2}) in the Adirondacks of New York State; he paid 15 cents an acre. In this manner he established Brandreth Park, the first private preserve in the future Adirondack Park. Included on the property is 890-acre (3.6 km^{2}) Brandreth Lake. Hamilton County is one of the least densely populated counties in the eastern United States. The property is mountainous and heavily forested.

== History ==
Brandreth Park remains in the family today and incorporates a number of cabins and cottages in a preserved wilderness setting. According to Adirondack Life Magazine, Dr. Brandreth commissioned a certain Mr. Blanchard to find him a lake at the top of the watershed, because he didn't want any water flowing into his lake. Blanchard found Township 39 and today the lake is known as Brandreth Lake.

Dr. Brandreth lost the property in 1873 for failing to pay taxes, but his wife bought it at State auction for $5,091. Currently the property contains 12,500 acres (51 km^{2}) and is owned by 90 of Dr. Brandreth's descendants.

At one point the Adirondacks contained 45 such private estates, but as of 2000 only four remained, and Brandreth's is the oldest.

Upon Brandreth's death in 1880, the property was eligible to be inherited by six of his children. Two of his sons, Franklin and Ralph Brandreth, and his son-in-law, General Edwin A. McAlpin, purchased the interests of the other children and consolidated ownership in their hands, and those of their heirs.

== Management ==
Throughout its ownership by the Brandreth family, the property has been managed in a way to preserve as much as possible its native character. In order to preserve the property's primitive character, all development is limited to the north end of Brandreth Lake, and no motor boats are allowed on the lake. The family anticipated the concept of cluster development by concentrating all building on the north side of the lake, thereby ensuring pristine views toward the south. Property owners, all descendants of Dr. Brandreth, need to apply to the building committee of the Brandreth Park Association before building.

The property was not logged for many years, as the family desired to maintain it in a primitive condition. However, in 1911–1919, a softwood harvest was performed by the Mac-a-Mac Lumber Corporation, of which John N. McDonald and Benjamin Brandreth McAlpin, son of Gen. Edwin A. McAlpin, were principals. This first harvest was extensive, with between 30 and 35 railcars of spruce logs shipped daily to the St. Regis Paper Company's plant in Deferiet. Mac-a-Mac stored an additional 70 carloads of cut logs in ponds and lakes for later transport off the property. A second harvest took place in the mid-1920s. Since then the family has permitted occasional selective harvesting.

In the 1950s, the Brandreths sold 6,000 acres (24 km^{2}) and donated an additional 9,000 acres (36 km^{2}) to Syracuse University while retaining recreational usage rights in perpetuity. Around this time the family created the Brandreth Park Association to provide a vehicle for each family member to have a voice in the management of the property, and to help pay for taxes and other operating costs. In 1992, the Association enrolled the property under the New York State Forest Tax Law, which provides for an 80% exemption from property taxes in exchange for a commitment to sustainable timber production. In 2007, some members of the family established a nonprofit organization known as the Shingle Shanty Preserve and Research Station in order to preserve and protect the land adjacent to present-day Brandreth Park, on which the family still retains recreational rights. This tract was last owned by The Nature Conservancy. The Shingle Shanty Preserve and Research Station makes the Shingle Shanty property available to outside parties for research subject to permit.
