= Karl F. Hausauer =

Adjutant general of New York (1950–1957)

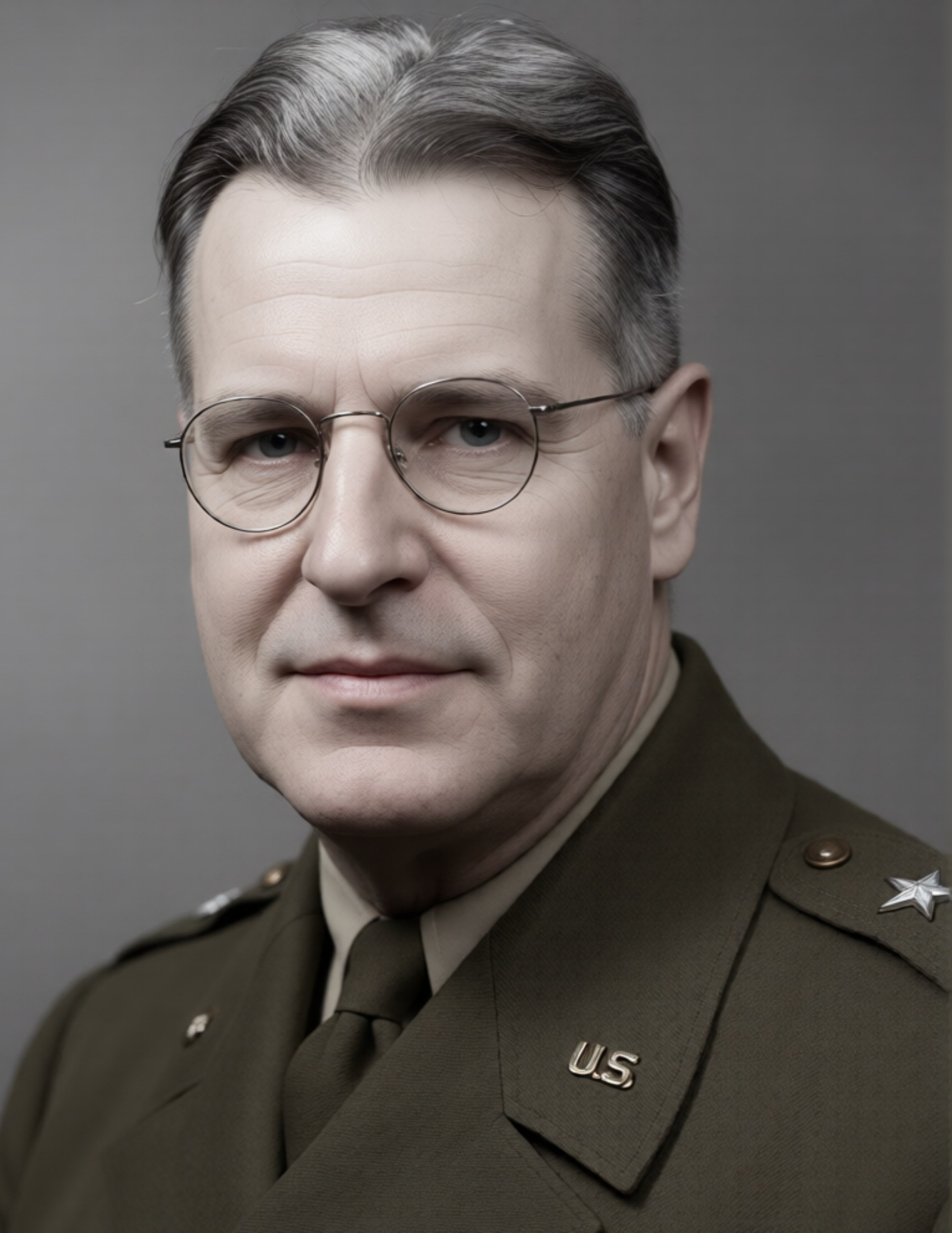
- Hausauer in 1953
- Born: 31 October 1896; Buffalo, New York, US
- Died: 5 December 1979 (aged 83); Houston, Texas, US
- Burial place: Crestlawn Cemetery, Vero Beach, Florida, US
- Alma mater: Carnegie Institute of Technology
- Spouse(s): Portia Lucille Bargar (m. 1925–1967) Phyllis Kirk Allen (m. 1970–1971)
- Children: 2
- Military career
- Service: United States Army; Organized Reserve Corps; New York Army National Guard
- Service years: 1918, 1941–1946 (Army); 1918–1921, 1946–1948 (Reserve); 1917–1918, 1921–1941, 1948–1957 (National Guard)
- Rank: Major General (National Guard); Lieutenant General (Retired list)
- Service number: O142022
- Units: US Army Field Artillery Branch; US Army Coast Artillery Corps
- Commands: Battery D, 106th Field Artillery Regiment; 1st Battalion, 106th Field Artillery Regiment; 1st Battalion, 209th Coast Artillery (Anti-Aircraft) Regiment; 209th Coast Artillery (Anti-Aircraft) Regiment; 102nd Coast Artillery Brigade (Anti-Aircraft); US Forces, Port of Belfast; 105th Antiaircraft Brigade; New York Guard; Adjutant General of New York
- Wars: World War I World War II
- Awards: Legion of Merit; Bronze Star Medal; Order of the British Empire; Croix de Guerre with palm (Belgium); Croix de Guerre with palm (France)
- Other work: President, Baker, Jones and Hausauer Printing

Karl F. Hausauer (31 October 1896 – 5 December 1979) was an American businessman and military officer from New York. In addition to a civilian career as an executive of a Buffalo, New York printing company, he served in the army from 1918 to 1957, including time with the Regular Army, Organized Reserve Corps, and National Guard. A veteran of World War I and World War II, from 1950 to 1957 Hausauer served as Adjutant General of New York.

A native of Buffalo, Hausauer graduated from the Carnegie Institute of Technology in 1917 and joined his family's printing business. In October 1917, he began his military career when he joined the New York National Guard's Company A, 74th Infantry Regiment as a private. He was activated for federal service during World War I and underwent officer training at Camp Zachary Taylor, Kentucky. He received his commission shortly after the end of the war; after his release from active duty he joined the Organized Reserve Corps.

Hausauer later transferred to the National Guard, and he advanced through staff and command assignments in the Field Artillery and Coast Artillery, including command of Battery D, 106th Field Artillery Regiment, and 1st Battalion, 106th Field Artillery Regiment. During World War II, he commanded 1st Battalion, 209th Coast Artillery (Anti-Aircraft) Regiment, and acted as commander of the regiment and its higher headquarters, the 102nd Coast Artillery Brigade (Anti-Aircraft). After arrival in Europe, he commanded US Forces, Port of Belfast and was one of the planners of the Operation Overlord invasion of France.

After the war, Hausauer advanced to the general officer ranks and commanded the 105th Antiaircraft Brigade and the New York Guard. In 1950 he was appointed the head of New York's National Guard; in most states this position is titled the adjutant general; legislation enacted at the time of Hausauer's appointment changed the title to chief of staff to the governor. Hausauer retired from the military in 1957. After retiring from a position with the state government in 1960, he resided in Vero Beach, Florida. Hausauer died in Houston, Texas on 5 December 1979 and was buried at Crestlawn Cemetery in Vero Beach.

== Early life ==
Karl Frederick Hausauer was born in Buffalo, New York on 31 October 1896, a son of George M. Hausauer and Isabella (Plogsted) Hausauer. He was educated in the public schools of Buffalo, and was a 1913 graduate of Lafayette High School. In 1917, he received a Bachelor of Arts degree from the Carnegie Institute of Technology. (Note: Sources include conflicting dates for Hausauer's high school and college graduations. The date for his graduation from high school is variously given as 1911 to 1915. His college graduation date is given as 1914 to 1917.) After college, he began work with his family's printing business, Baker, Jones and Hausauer; he eventually became president and chairman of the board, and he remained with the company until it was liquidated in 1963.

== Start of military career ==
In September 1917, Hausauer was chosen as second lieutenant of the Parkside Company of the First Home Defense Regiment, a home guard unit organized to protect strategic sites as the US prepared for entry into the First World War. In October 1917, Hausauer began his United States Army career when he joined the New York National Guard's Company A, 74th Infantry Regiment as a private. He was promoted to sergeant in January 1918. In August 1918, he entered the Regular Army for World War I. Selected for positions of more rank and responsibility, he was assigned to the Field Artillery Central Officers Training School at Camp Zachary Taylor, Kentucky. Hausauer continued his training after the Armistice of November 11, 1918 ended the war, and in December he received his commission as a second lieutenant of Field Artillery.

After receiving his commission, Hausauer was discharged from the Regular Army and transferred to the Organized Reserve Corps. In February 1921, he returned to the New York National Guard as a member of the 65th Field Artillery Regiment. He continued to serve with this organization when it was redesignated the 106th Field Artillery Regiment, and he was promoted to first lieutenant in August 1921 and captain in August 1922. He commanded Battery D from 1921 to 1923, then was assigned as the regimental plans, operations, and training officer (R-3). He was transferred to the staff of the regiment's 2nd Battalion in April 1928 and promoted to major in June 1928. In March 1929, he was transferred to command of 1st Battalion, 106th Field Artillery. Hausauer remained in this position until June 1940, when he was assigned as the regimental executive officer.

== Continued military career ==
In July 1940, Hausauer was assigned to assist in the formation of a new regiment, the 209th Coast Artillery (Anti-Aircraft) Regiment, and he was designated the commander of its 1st Battalion. He was promoted to lieutenant colonel in August, and led the recruiting, organization, and training of his battalion in Buffalo until February 1941, when the unit entered active duty for World War II and departed for additional training at Camp Stewart, Georgia. After reaching Georgia, Hausauer was assigned as the regimental executive officer and second-in-command. In the summer of 1941, Hausauer was among the 209th Regiment's officers selected for attendance at a 10 week antiaircraft artillery course which was held at Fort Monroe, Virginia. In June, he was appointed acting regimental commander. In December, most 209th soldiers were granted Christmas furloughs; Hausauer was appointed acting commander of the 209th's higher headquarters, the 102nd Coast Artillery Brigade (Anti-Aircraft).

In February 1942, Hausauer was among the senior officers of the 209th Coast Artillery who were selected for advanced tactical training at Fort Monroe. In late 1942, Hausauer left the 209th Coast Artillery for Belfast, Northern Ireland, where he was assigned to command US forces at the Port of Belfast, one of the main points of entry for US Army units arriving in the European theatre. In May 1943, Hausauer was promoted to colonel and he served as assistant chief of staff for logistics (G-4) on the staff of the European Theater of Operations, United States Army (ETOUSA) headquarters in England. In 1944 and 1945, Hausauer was a member of the Supreme Headquarters Allied Expeditionary Force's (SHAEF) Chief of Staff to the Supreme Allied Commander's (COSSAC) team that developed the plan for the Operation Overlord invasion of mainland Europe. In March 1945, Hausauer was dispatched from England to the United States on temporary duty to attend planning conferences and conduct liaison between SHAEF and the US Department of War. Hausauer was in England at the end of the war; returned to the United States in October 1945, and was released from active duty in March 1946.

== Later military career ==
From March 1946 to February 1948, Hausauer belonged to the Organized Reserve Corps; assigned to the New York National Guard's state headquarters, he took part in the Guard's post-war reorganization. In July 1947, he was assigned to command the National Guard's 105th Antiaircraft Artillery Brigade as a brigadier general. In September 1948, Hausauer was selected to command the New York Guard, succeeding Hugh A. Drum, who had held the position during the Second World War. In October, Hausauer received promotion to major general. In May 1949, Hausauer was appointed military chief of staff to the governor; the law creating this position made the state adjutant general's position, then held by Ames T. Brown, subordinate to the chief of staff. The New York Division of Military and Naval Affairs continued to use the chief of staff title for its head until 1988, when it was changed back to Adjutant General of New York. The legislation creating the chief of staff's position also directed the chief of staff to disband the New York Guard, presuming there was no need for it following World War II; the continued need for the organization during the Korean War soon became apparent, and the New York Guard's reconstitution and reorganization began in 1950.

Hausauer's term as head of New York's National Guard was marked by the organization and fielding of the New York Air National Guard, which had been created in 1947. He also oversaw the activation and training of New York units for federal service during the Korean War. In addition, he led the Guard's reorganization during the Cold War, including an emphasis on Armor units to defend West Germany in the event of an invasion from the Soviet Union. Hausauer retired from the military in January 1957 and was succeeded by Ronald C. Brock. In May 1957, he was appointed the state Division of Military and Naval Affairs liaison to the US Department of Defense, a position he received in order to allow him to qualify for a state pension. Hausauer retired in 1959 and moved to Vero Beach, Florida. In February 1960, he received promotion to lieutenant general on the state's retired list as a commendation of the outstanding service he rendered throughout his career. Hausauer's US awards and decorations included the Legion of Merit and Bronze Star Medal. His foreign decorations included the Order of the British Empire, Belgian Croix de Guerre with palm, and French Croix de Guerre with palm.

== Retirement and death ==
After moving to Florida, Hausauer took part in civic and charitable activities, including board of directors member and fundraising drives chairman for the Indian River County Library. He also became active in the Indian River chapter of the Military Order of the World Wars. In addition, he was a member of the American Legion and served as a member of the Vero Beach maritime commission that was created to regulate boats and yachts at the city's docks and marinas. Hausauer died in Houston, Texas on 5 December 1979. He was buried at Crestlawn Cemetery in Vero Beach.

== Dates of rank ==
Hausauer's dates of rank were:

- Private, 30 October 1917
- Sergeant, 21 January 1918
- Second Lieutenant, 21 December 1918
- First Lieutenant, 8 August 1921
- Captain, 21 August 1922
- Major, 20 June 1928
- Lieutenant Colonel, 4 August 1940
- Colonel, 26 May 1943
- Brigadier General, 8 July 1947
- Major General, 25 October 1948
- Lieutenant General (Retired List), 8 February 1960
