= Augusta-CSRA Vietnam War Veterans Memorial =

The Augusta-Central Savannah River Area (CSRA) Vietnam War Veterans Memorial is a granite and bronze monument placed in Augusta, Georgia, March 29, 2019, to honor the CSRA's 169 Vietnam War dead, three Ex-Prisoners of War (Vietnam), and one former Missing in Action (MIA) as well as the region's 15,000 surviving Vietnam War Veterans. The memorial is located in the "Olde Town" section of Augusta, Georgia, on the Broad Street median between Third and Fourth Streets. The monument was designed, purchased, and placed by the Augusta Chapter of the Military Order of the World Wars (MOWW) and the chapter's 17 community partners who made up the Augusta-CSRA Vietnam War Memorial Initiative (VWMI) Steering Committee.

== Objective ==
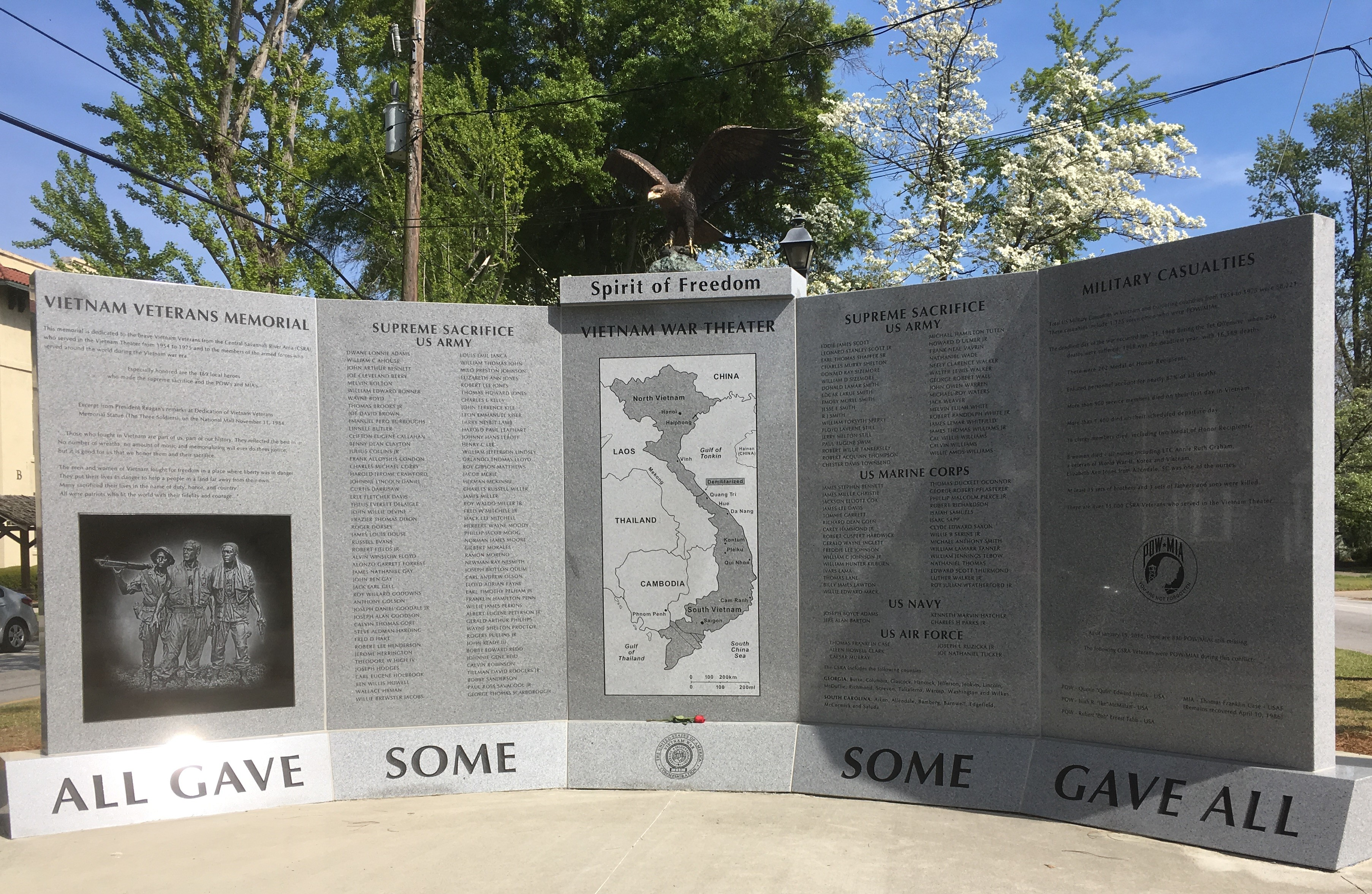
Augusta-CSRA Vietnam War Veterans Memorial. Front. March 29, 2019.

The memorial's objective is to honor the service and sacrifice of the Augusta and Central Savannah River Area's (CSRA) U.S. military service members who served in Vietnam. The memorial was placed in support of the 50th Anniversary of the Vietnam War (2012–2025), as declared by the U.S. Congress (Public Law 110–181, Section 598) and the Department of Defense's Vietnam War Commemoration program.

== Memorial structure and inscriptions ==
The memorial's front center-right and center-left panels identify each of the 169 service members from the Augusta and Central Savannah River Area (CSRA) who lost their lives in Vietnam. The mid-center panel portrays a map of the Vietnam theater of operations and the inscription "Spirit of Freedom". The far right and far left front panels depict the names of the region's three EX-POWs and one MIA, an engraving of the Three Soldiers statue in Washington, D.C., and a quote from former President Ronald Reagan's commemoration address, delivered on the National Mall, November 11, 1984:

Those who fought in Vietnam are part of us, part of our history. They reflected the best in us. No number of wreaths, no amount of music and memorializing will ever do them justice, but it is good for us that we honor them and their sacrifice ... The men and women of Vietnam fought for freedom in a place where liberty was in danger. They put their lives in danger to help a people in a land far away from their own. Many sacrificed their lives in the name of duty, honor, and country. All were patriots who lit the world with their fidelity and courage.

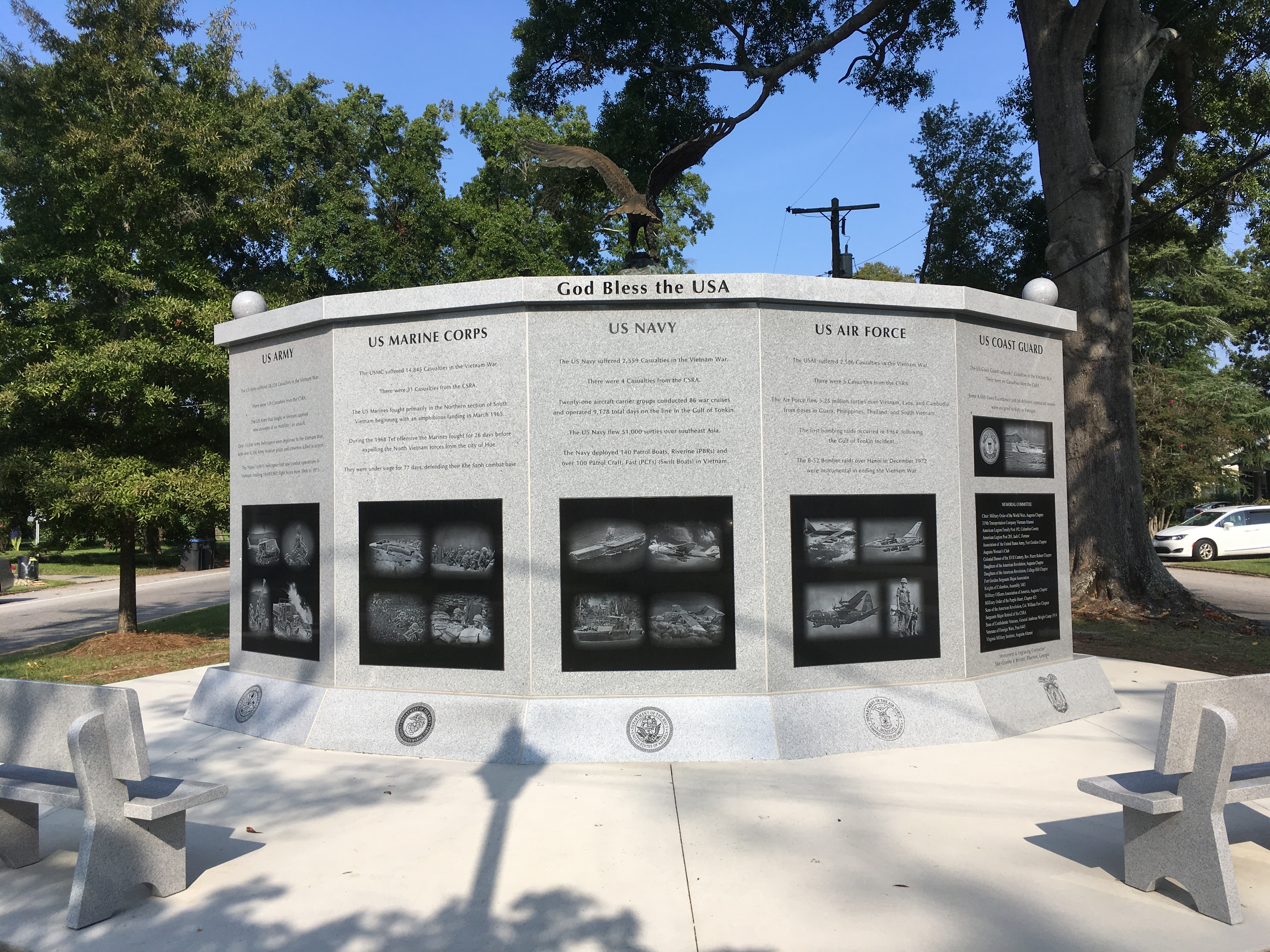
Augusta-CSRA Vietnam War Veterans Memorial. Reverse. August 12, 2019.

The reverse of the memorial recognizes each of the five branches of the Armed Services who fought in Vietnam, displays engraved period photographs from each service, and provides service statistics from each service branch. The reverse also displays the names of the 17 organizations who partnered with the Augusta Chapter of the MOWW for design, purchase, and placement of the monument.

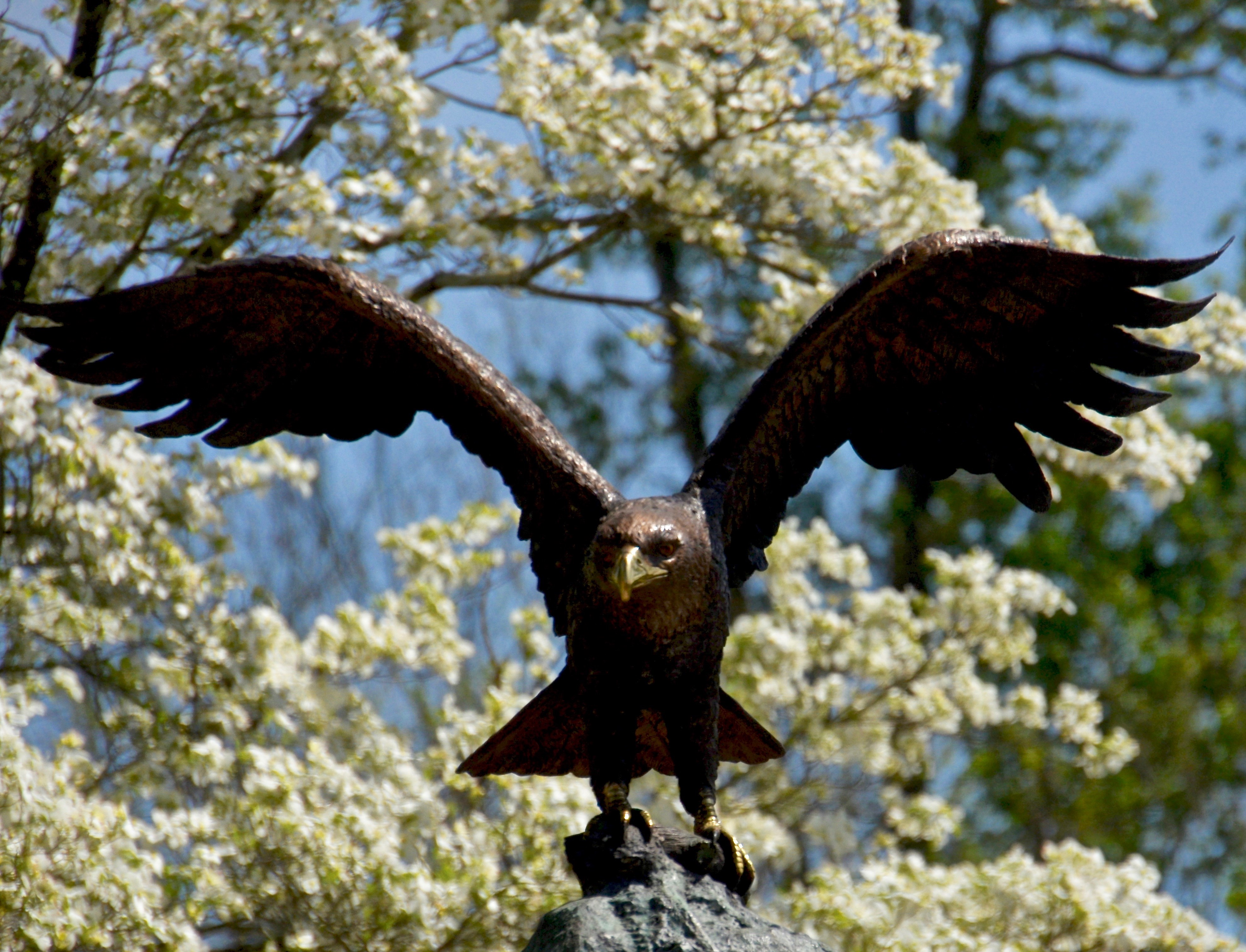
A bronze eagle sculpture titled Spirit of Freedom serves as the memorial's centerpiece.

The memorial's centerpiece is a 220-pound (100 kg) solid bronze eagle sculpture titled Spirit of Freedom, which stands 3.5 feet (1.1 m) high and has an expansive wingspan of 5 feet (1.5 m) in length. The sculpture was purchased by a single donor from a bronze sculpture and art company located in California. Inscriptions beneath the bronze eagle sculpture read "Spirit of Freedom" (front) and "God Bless the USA" (reverse).

The memorial was finalized in August 2019, with the placement of a Vietnam-era bronze Soldier's Cross, a granite pedestal, four engraved granite benches, four additional granite mantle pieces, and four bronze recognition plaques.

== Location selection ==
The memorial's location was selected due to the site's close proximity to Augusta's All Wars Monument, Korean War Monument and Purple Heart Monument, and due to the historical significance of the "Olde Town" Augusta region.

== Cost and production ==
The memorial's cost of production was just over $100,000 which was raised entirely through donations and private contributions. The memorial was constructed by Star Granite and Bronze Company of Elberton, Georgia, a Matthews International Corporation subsidiary.

== Dedication ceremony ==
March 29, 2019 – National Vietnam War Veterans Day – was chosen for the memorial's unveiling and dedication ceremony due to the significance of the date to Vietnam War veterans and their families. The ceremony's keynote speaker was Major General James E. Livingston, U.S. Marine Corps (Ret), Medal of Honor Recipient (1970) for actions above and beyond the call of duty in the Republic of South Vietnam, May 1968. General Livingston was born and raised in Telfair County, Georgia and now resides in Charleston, South Carolina. The ceremony also included remarks from Augusta's Mayor Hardie Davis, Jr., Congressman Rick Allen of Georgia's 12th District, Commissioner Michael Roby of the Georgia Department of Veterans Service, and Brigadier General Christopher L. Eubank, Chief of U.S. Army Signal and the Signal School Commandant.

Ceremony highlights included a static display of numerous vintage military vehicles, courtesy of Augusta's former Mayor, the Honorable Robert Wood Young and Team Rubicon, musical performances of "Some Gave All" and "God Bless the USA" by the Fort Gordon Joint Service Choir, special bagpipe selections played by local musician Gary Hassan, poetry written in honor of Vietnam service members who were killed in action by SGM Douglas P. Hastings, U.S. Army (retired), and a three-volley salute and the playing of Taps conducted by the Fort Gordon Installation Support Detachment. Officiating clergy was Reverend Robert D. Fain, Church of the Good Shepherd, Augusta, Georgia.

== Military Order of the World Wars ==
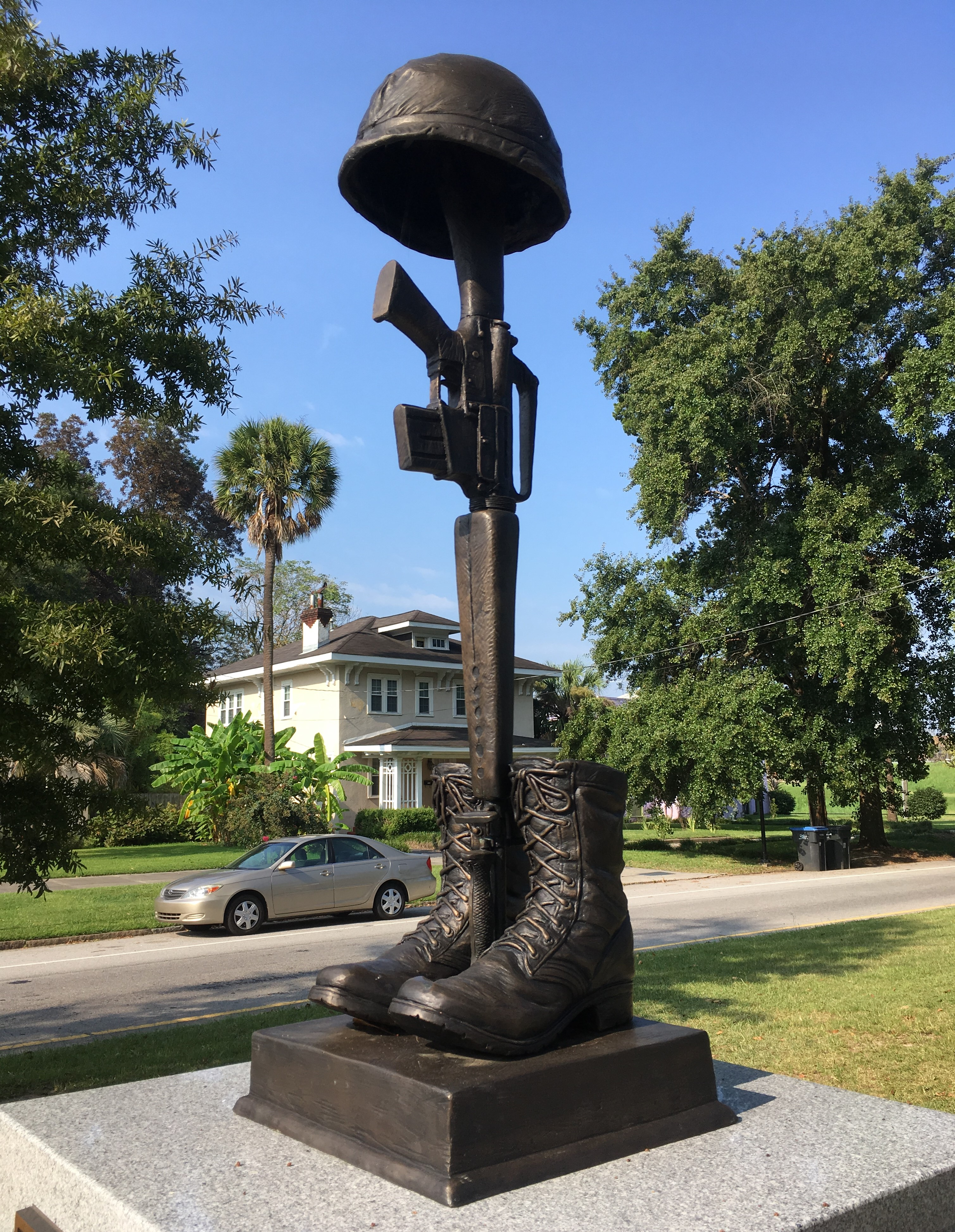
A bronze Vietnam-era Soldier's Cross commemorates all Vietnam veterans who lost their lives in Vietnam.

The memorial's proponent organization was the Military Order of the World Wars (MOWW) Augusta Chapter. MOWW is a patriotic Veterans Service Organization whose motto is "It is nobler to serve than to be served." MOWW was founded at the suggestion of General of the Armies John J. Pershing in 1919 to promote good citizenship, patriotic education, and military and public service. MOWW chapters provide opportunities to support patriotic education, ROTC and JROTC, scouting, monuments and memorials, law and order, and national and homeland security programs. The memorial project was completed in accordance with the Order's "Preamble" as noted on the organization's official website.

== Works cited and additional reading ==
- Dawson, Drew (March 29, 2019). "Vietnam war memorial unveiled in Augusta'". WGPB Georgia Public Radio.
- LeBlanc, Sarah (March 29, 2018). "Mayor honors Vietnam war veterans". The Augusta Chronicle. Augusta, Georgia.
- LeBlanc, Sarah (November 5, 2018). "Augusta planning commission supportive of Vietnam Memorial". The Augusta Chronicle. Augusta, Georgia.
- Osborne, Ashley (March 29, 2019). "Vietnam war veterans memorial unveiled". WJBF. ABC News Channel 6.
- Military Order of the World Wars (2019). "About MOWW".
- Papp, Jozsef (March 28, 2019). "Augusta Vietnam veterans to be honored with monument Friday". The Augusta Chronicle. Augusta, Georgia.
- Papp, Jozsef (March 29, 2019). Vietnam war veterans memorial to be unveiled today. The Augusta Chronicle, Augusta, Georgia. Retrieved from https://www.augustachronicle.com/news/20190329/augusta-area-vietnam-vets-honored-as-downtown-memorial-unveiled
- Papp, Jozef (March 30, 2019). Vietnam veterans memorial unveiled. The Augusta Chronicle, Augusta, Georgia.
- Rodes, Don (October 28, 2018). Augusta's Vietnam memorial on target for March unveiling. The Augusta Chronicle, Augusta, Georgia. Retrieved from https://www.augustachronicle.com/news/20181028/augustas-vietnam-memorial-on-target-for-march-unveiling
- Ronald Reagan Presidential Library and Museum (2019). Speeches. Remarks at Dedication Ceremonies for the Vietnam Veterans Memorial Statue." Retrieved from https://www.reaganlibrary.gov/research/speeches/111184a
- Strickland, Harley (September 27, 2019). Augusta-CSRA Vietnam war veterans memorial unveiled. East Georgia State College. Retrieved from http://www.ega.edu/articles/detail/augusta-csra-vietnam-war-veterans-memorial-unveiled
- The United States of America Vietnam War Commemoration. (2019). Retrieved from https://www.vietnamwar50th.com
- Vietnam War Memorial Initiative. (2019). About. Retrieved from https://vwmi-augusta.org
