= Valley of the Tomb =

Site of Napoleon's initial tomb

Coordinates: 15°57′33.18″S 5°41′53.54″W

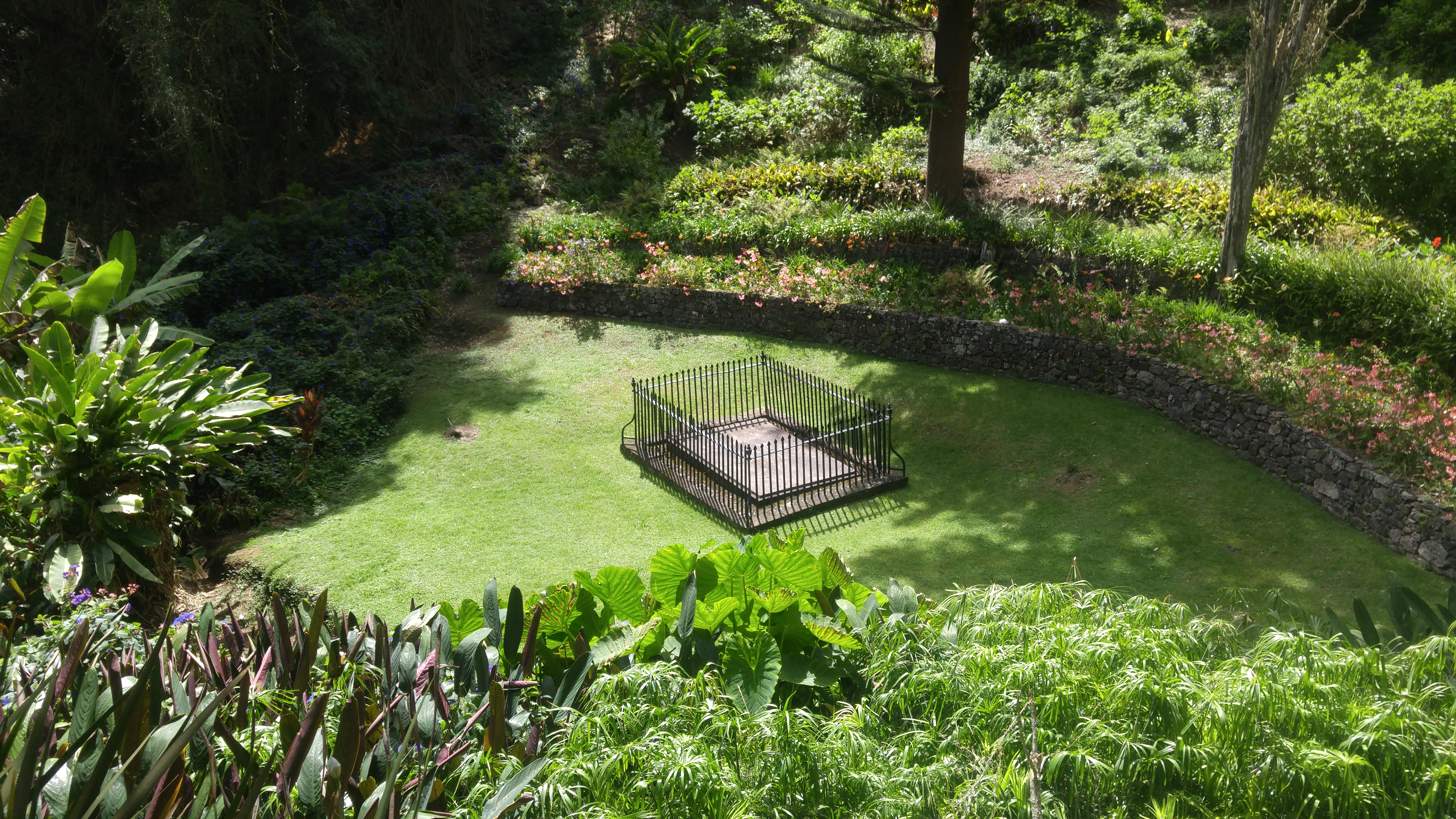
Napoleon's Tomb on Saint Helena

The Valley of the Tomb (French: Vallée du Tombeau) is the site of Napoleon's original tomb, on the British Overseas Territory of Saint Helena in the south Atlantic Ocean, where he was buried following his death in exile on 5 May 1821. The valley had been called the Sane Valley, but Napoleon had taken walks there and referred to it as the Valley of the Geraniums.

Napoleon did not expect to be buried on Saint Helena, but in case that he was, his request was to "have me buried in the shade of the willows where I used to rest on the way to see you at Hutt’s Gate, near the fountain where they go to fetch my water every day". He was buried with full military honours as a general. The full British garrison of 3,000 men lined the route of the cortège, with arms reversed. French general Tristan de Montholon requested that the tomb be engraved simply with "NAPOLEON" and his dates of birth and death, but the governor, Sir Hudson Lowe, refused and insisted that "Bonaparte" be added. As a result of the impasse, the tomb slab was left blank.

The French government of Louis Philippe I requested that Napoleon's remains be repatriated to France and, on 15 October 1840, his body was exhumed and later reburied at the Invalides in Paris, in an event known as the Retour des cendres. In 1854, the French government under Napoleon III negotiated to purchase the Valley of the Tomb and Longwood House. It was bought in 1858, and is still French property, administered by a French representative and under the authority of the French Ministry of Foreign Affairs.

== Gallery ==
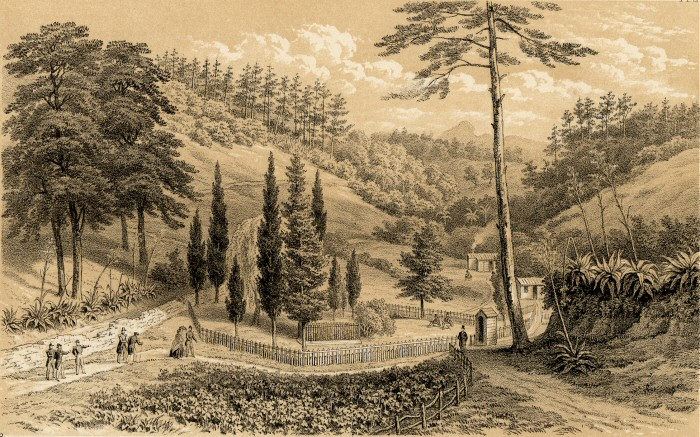

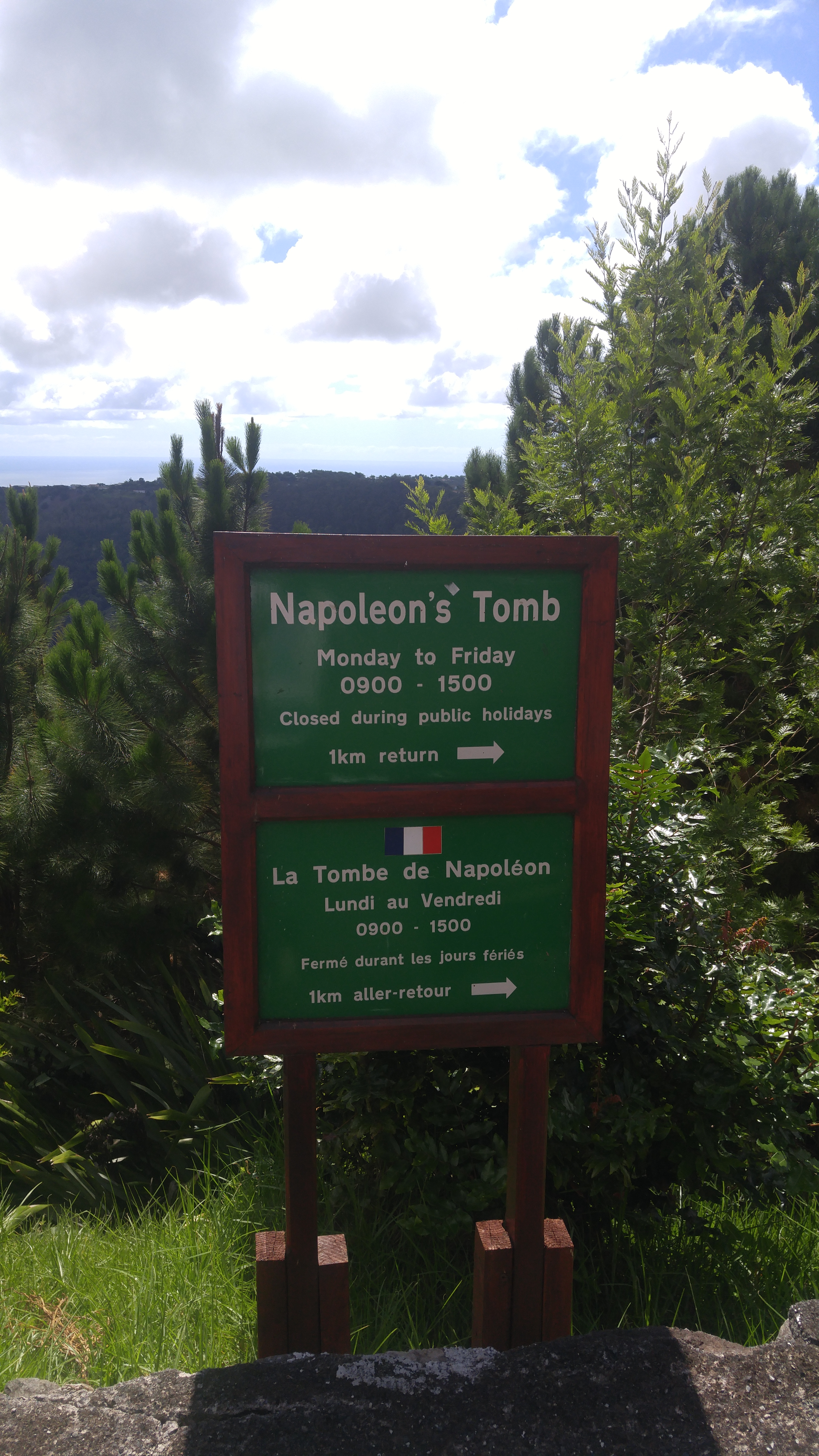

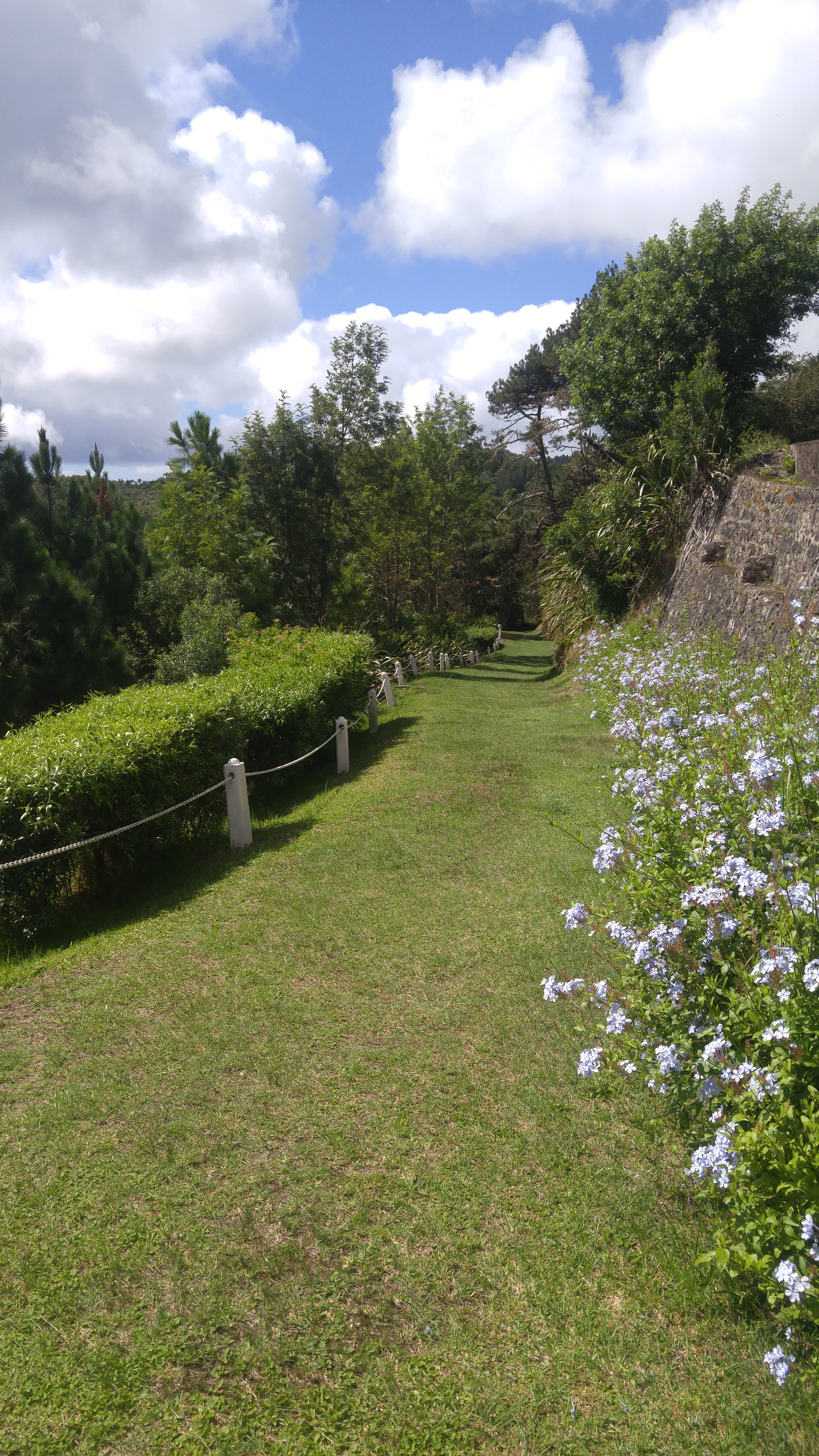

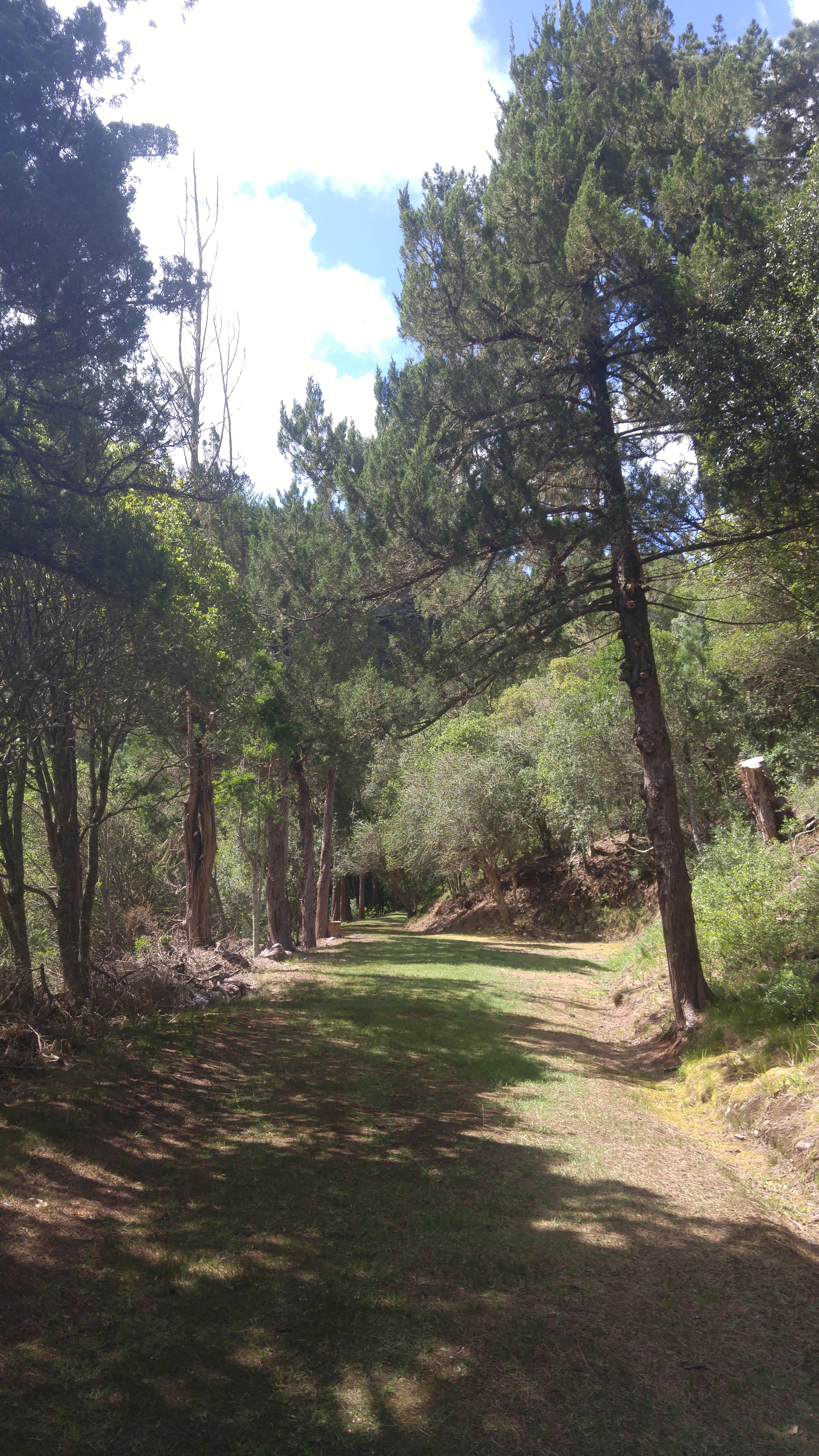

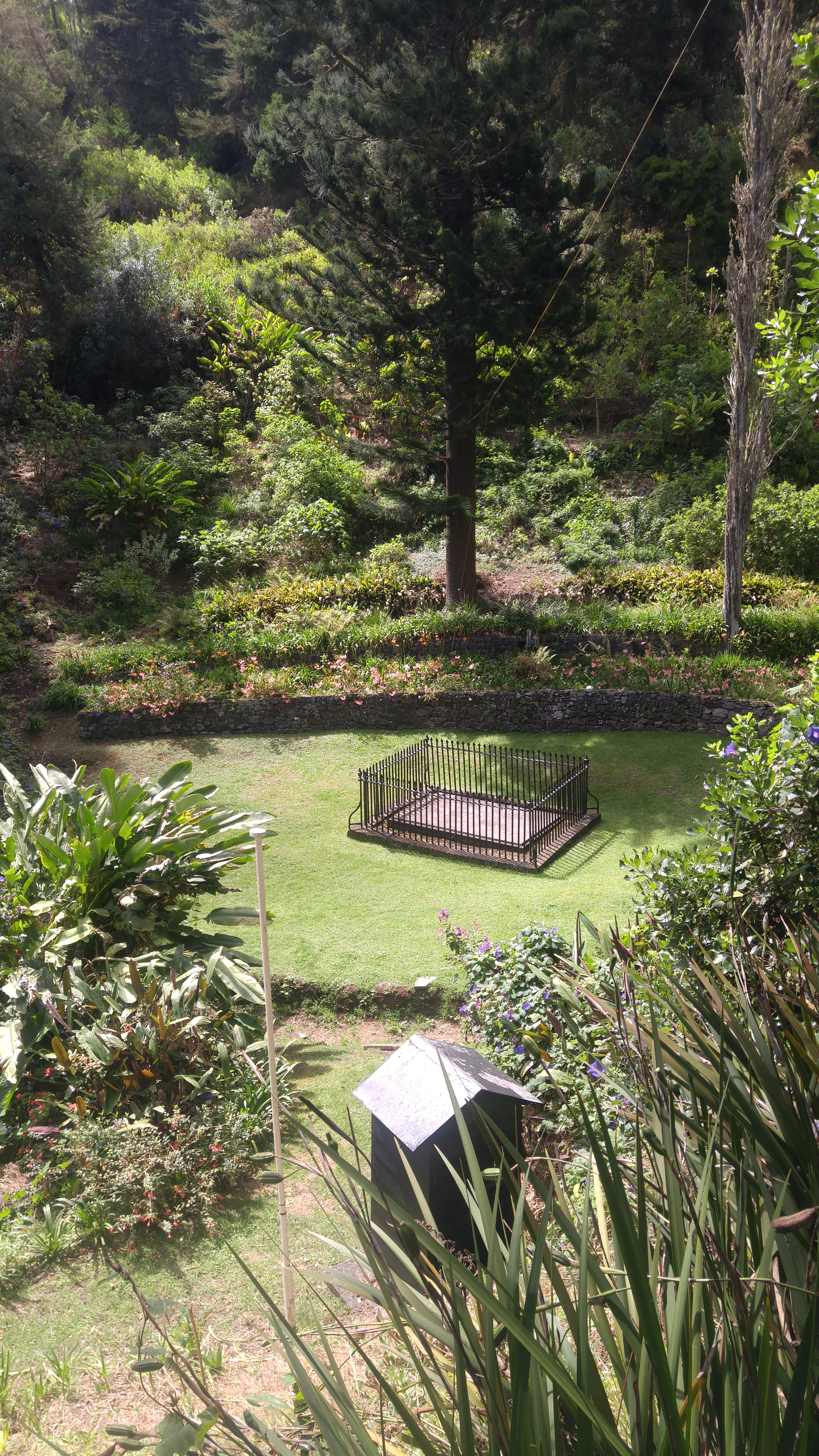

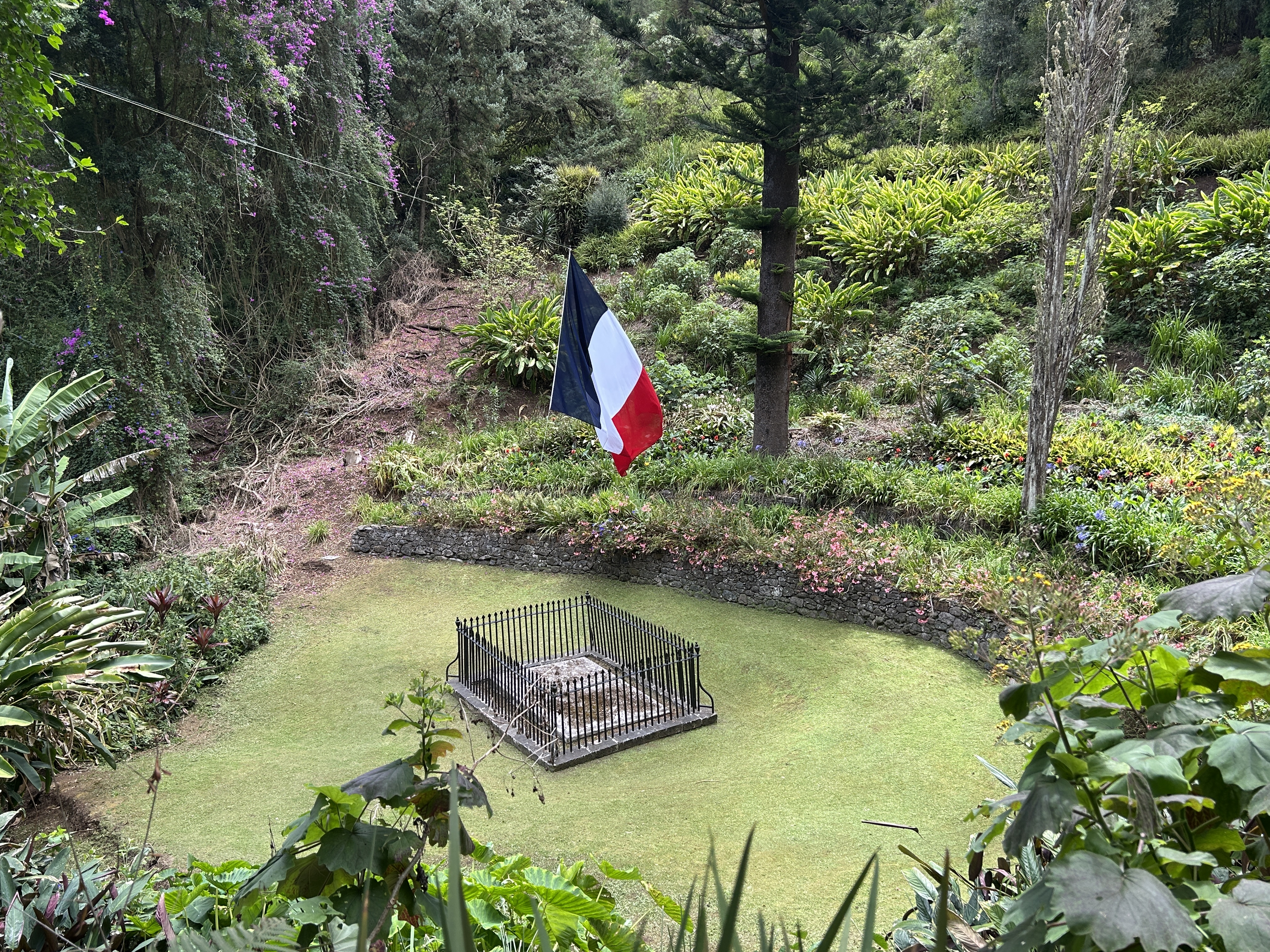

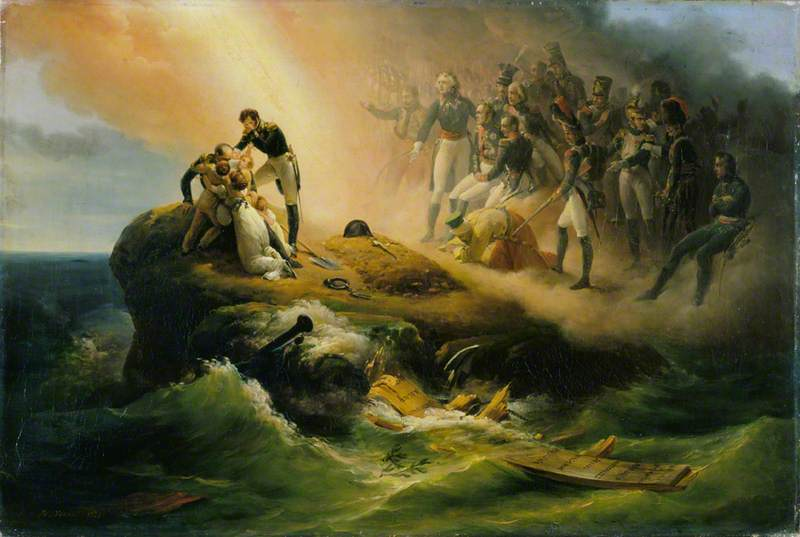
Napoleon's Tomb by Horace Vernet, 1821. Vernet's fictionalised and romantic depiction of Napoleon's burial on Saint Helena
