= Ames T. Brown =

Adjutant General of New York (1940–1949)

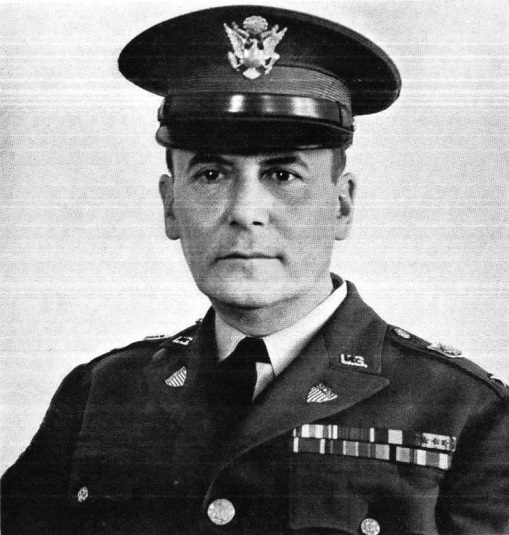
- Brown in 1940
- Born: 3 November 1890; Boston, Massachusetts, US
- Died: 19 May 1961 (aged 70); Manhattan, New York, US
- Burial place: Arlington National Cemetery
- Spouse: Catherine Webber (m. 1930–1961)
- Children: 2
- Military career
- Service: United States Army; New York National Guard; Organized Reserve Corps
- Service years: 1915–1916, 1925–1940, 1945–1950 (National Guard); 1916, 1917–1919, 1940–1945 (Army); 1921–1925 (Reserve)
- Rank: Major General
- Service number: 0158593
- Unit: US Army Infantry Branch
- Commands: Company C, 106th Infantry Regiment; 1st Battalion, 106th Infantry Regiment; 3rd Battalion, 71st Infantry Regiment; Adjutant General of New York
- Conflicts: Mexican Border War; World War I Occupation of the Rhineland; World War II
- Awards: Army Distinguished Service Medal; Silver Star; Purple Heart; New York Conspicuous Service Cross
- Other work: Clerk, Fruit Dispatch Company

Ames T. Brown (3 November 1890 – 19 May 1961) was a career officer in the United States Army. A veteran of Mexican Border War, World War I, and World War II, he attained the rank of brigadier general while serving as Adjutant General of New York from 1940 to 1950. He was promoted to major general when he left the military upon reaching the mandatory retirement age of 60.

A native of Boston, Brown moved to Manhattan after high school and worked for the Fruit Dispatch Company. He joined the New York National Guard in 1915, and served with his regiment in Texas during the Mexican Border War. During World War I, he served in combat in France and received the Silver Star, Purple Heart, and New York Conspicuous Service Cross. After service in the Organized Reserve Corps, he returned to the National Guard in the mid-1920s and commanded a battalion of the 71st Infantry Regiment and served as the regiment's plans, operations, and training officer (S-3).

In 1934, Brown became the New York National Guard's assistant adjutant general and executive assistant to the adjutant general. In 1940, the adjutant general died, and Brown was appointed to succeed him. Brown led the organization during World War II and was also New York's federal Selective Service director. He retired from the military in 1950 and from his Selective Service post in 1953. Brown was a recipient of the Army Distinguished Service Medal for his Second World War service.

== Early life and start of career ==
Ames Thorndike Brown was born in Boston on 3 November 1890, a son of Herbert Alvah Brown and Mary Emma (Ames) Brown. He was educated in Boston, and completed the elementary grades at the Prince School in 1904. He went on to study at Boston's Mechanic Arts High School; after graduation he moved to New York City, where he became a clerk with the Fruit Dispatch Company.

Brown began his military career when he joined the New York National Guard. Commissioned as a second lieutenant of Infantry, he was assigned to Company M, 71st Infantry Regiment on February 19, 1915. In June 1916, he was activated for federal service when his regiment was dispatched to Texas during the Mexican Border War, and he remained in Texas until the end of his tour in October 1916. The 71st Infantry was activated for World War I in March 1917, and he was promoted to first lieutenant. The regiment performed guard and patrol duties at public utilities and other strategic sites in Orange County, New York. During this duty, Brown was assigned as the acting regimental adjutant; when the 71st Infantry moved to Camp Wadsworth, South Carolina to complete training in preparation for combat in France, Brown was assigned as 1st Battalion's adjutant.

== Continued career ==
When the 27th Division was organized at Camp Wadsworth in October 1917, Brown was assigned to the new 106th Infantry Regiment and appointed as adjutant of the 1st Battalion. After training, the division departed for France and Brown took part in combat in Belgium, Northern France and the breaking of the Hindenburg Line. On October 18, 1918, when the British Fourth Army, including the attached 27th Division, attacked on the line of the La Selle River, Brown was in command of 1st Battalion, 106th Infantry. On the following day, he was struck in the face by shrapnel, but refused evacuation and remained with the battalion until it was relieved during the night of 20–21 October. His heroism was recognized with the Citation Star; when the Silver Star award was created in 1932, Brown's decoration was upgraded to the new award. The Purple Heart was also introduced in 1932, and Brown received it in recognition of his wartime wound. He was promoted to captain in November 1918, shortly after the Armistice that ended the war.

Brown spent time in the hospital convalescing during the post-war Occupation of the Rhineland. He was promoted to major in February 1919 and commanded the 106th Infantry's Company C during the regiment's return to the United States and demobilization. He was discharged from active duty in April. In 1921, Brown's wartime heroism was recognized with award of the New York Conspicuous Service Cross. From June 1921 to February 1925, Brown was a major in the Organized Reserve Corps. Brown began serving with the 71st Infantry again in October 1924, and was assigned as the regimental machine gun officer. He subsequently commanded the 71st Infantry's 3rd Battalion, then was assigned as the regiment's plans, operations, and training officer (S-3). He was promoted to lieutenant colonel in June 1929. In April 1935, Brown was promoted to colonel and assigned as assistant adjutant general of the New York National Guard and executive officer for the Adjutant General of New York, Walter G. Robinson.

== Later career ==
Robinson died in 1940, and Brown was appointed to succeed him. Brown's tenure spanned World War II, and during the war he was responsible for overseeing the in state service of the National Guard, as well as the volunteer New York Guard. He was also appointed as the federal director of Selective Service for New York, and he continued in both these roles throughout the war. In 1946, Brown's wartime service was recognized with award of the Army Distinguished Service Medal. He was reappointed as Selective Service director in 1948, and continued in that role and in the adjutant general's post until reaching the mandatory retirement age of 60 in November 1950. At his military retirement, he was succeeded as head of the National Guard by Karl F. Hausauer in the new position of military chief of staff to the governor. At his military retirement, Brown was promoted to major general to recognize his many years of superior service. Brown was also chairman of the state's Commission on Veterans' Affairs. In addition, he served as president of the 27th Division Association.

After retiring as adjutant general, Brown continued to serve as the US Selective Service director for New York, and remained in this post through the Korean War; he retired in 1953. Brown belonged to the Shriners, and was a member of the New York Athletic Club, Old Guard of the City of New York, and Veteran Corps of Artillery. In addition, he belonged to the American Legion, New York Society of Military and Naval Officers of the World Wars, and Military Order of the World Wars. In retirement, he was a resident of Campbell Hall, New York. Brown died at the Veterans Affairs hospital in Manhattan on 19 May 1961. He was buried at Arlington National Cemetery. In 1930, Brown married Catherine Webber. They were married until his death and were the parents of two sons.

== Silver Star commendation ==
The commendation for Brown's Citation Star, which was later converted to the Silver Star, read:

Maj. Ames T. Brown, 106th Inf., Lexington, Mass. – For gallantry, determination, and qualities of leadership in the Battle of the La Selle River, October 17, 1918. After being painfully wounded in the face by a shell fragment, this officer continued in action, and later being gassed, he refused to be evacuated, remaining with his battalion until his regiment was withdrawn from the line on October 20, 1918.

Service: United States Army Rank: Captain Division: 27th Division, American Expeditionary Forces Action Date: October 17, 1918 Orders: 27th Division Special Order 31, January 31, 1919

== Dates of rank ==
Brown's dates of rank were:

- Second Lieutenant, 19 February 1915
- First Lieutenant, 31 March 1917
- Captain, 19 November 1918
- Major, 19 February 1919
- Lieutenant Colonel, 14 June 1929
- Colonel, 6 April 1935
- Brigadier General, 9 February 1940
- Major General, 3 November 1950
