= Harry Goldstein =

Member Florida House of Representatives

Member of the Florida House of Representatives
- In office 1911–1915
- Preceded by: James E. Calkins
- Succeeded by: D. T. Haddock, Jr

Personal details
- Born: August 7, 1878 Antopol, Russia
- Died: November 4, 1944 Miami, Florida, U.S.
- Resting place: Woodlawn Park North, Miami, Florida
- Party: Democratic

Military service
- Allegiance: United States
- Rank: Lieutenant
- Unit: 357th QM Bn
- Battles/wars: WWI

Harry Goldstein was born in Antopol, Russia and served in the Florida House of Representatives for Fernandina Beach, Florida.

He joined the United States Army as a Quartermaster officer in 1918. After WWI he was a banker and deputy Collector for the IRS.

He moved to Miami in 1921.

Goldstein became Tax Collector for the City of Miami in 1936.

He died on November 4, 1944, and is buried in Miami.

== Civic activities ==
Goldstein was Commander of the Harvey W Seeds American Legion Post #29 in Miami. He was active in the Elks Club, Military Order of the World Wars and Mahi Temple Shrine. As a Legion member, he was in charge of Boy Scout activities.
