= Winfield Scott Edgerly =

United States Army general

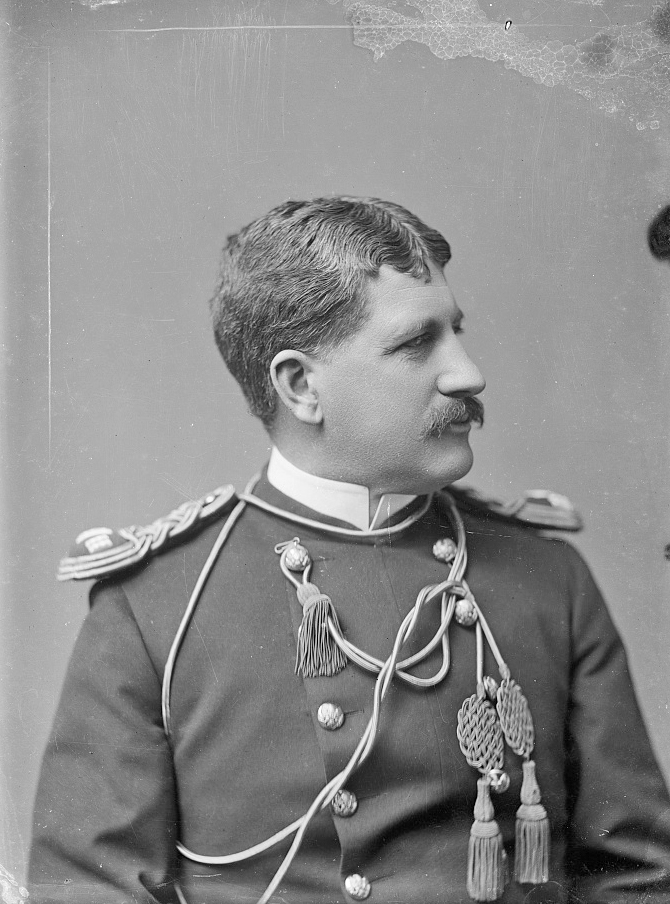
- Born: May 29, 1846; Farmington, New Hampshire, US
- Died: September 10, 1927 (aged 81); Farmington, New Hampshire, US
- Burial place: Arlington National Cemetery
- Spouse: Grace C. Blume (m. 1875)
- Military career
- Allegiance: United States
- Branch: United States Army
- Service years: 1870–1909; 1917
- Rank: Brigadier General
- Unit: 7th Cavalry Regiment
- Commands: 2nd Cavalry Regiment; Fort Myer; Department of the Gulf; Department of Dakota; United States Army Cavalry and Artillery School
- Conflicts: Indian Wars; Battle of Little Big Horn; Wounded Knee Massacre; Spanish–American War; World War I

Winfield Scott Edgerly (May 29, 1846 – September 10, 1927) was an officer in the United States Army in the nineteenth and twentieth centuries. Born in New Hampshire in 1846, he attended the United States Military Academy, graduating in 1870. He served on the frontier through the Indian Wars, including the Battle of the Little Big Horn and the Wounded Knee Massacre; in the Spanish–American War; in the Philippine Insurrection; and (briefly) in World War I. He served in several command positions. He was an observer of the Kaiser Maneuvers in Germany in 1907. He was retired as a brigadier general for disability in 1909, was recalled briefly in 1917 and died in 1927. Edgerly is buried at Arlington National Cemetery.

== Early life and education ==
Edgerly was born on May 29, 1846, in Farmington, New Hampshire. He was the son of Josiah Bartlett and Cordelia (Waldron) Edgerly and great-grandson of Colonel Thomas Tash of the New Hampshire Revolutionary militia. He was educated in public schools in Farmington, at Effingham Institute, and at Phillips Exeter Academy. On July 1, 1866, he began his studies at the United States Military Academy at West Point, New York. He graduated on June 15, 1870; his rank in his class is 50 of 58 and his Cullum number is 2361.

== Career ==
=== Second lieutenant ===
Edgerly was commissioned as a second lieutenant in the 7th Cavalry Regiment on June 15, 1870. He was assigned on the frontier; posts included Fort Leavenworth, Kansas; Fort Riley, Kansas; Fort Snelling, Minnesota; Fort Totten, Dakota Territory; and Fort Abraham Lincoln, Dakota Territory. He was assigned to several cities in the American South, including Mount Vernon, Kentucky; Meridian, Mississippi; Chester, South Carolina; Opelika, Alabama; and Memphis, Tennessee. He was assigned to escort the Northern Boundary Survey on two occasions.

He married Grace Cory Blume on October 27, 1875.

=== Sioux Expedition ===
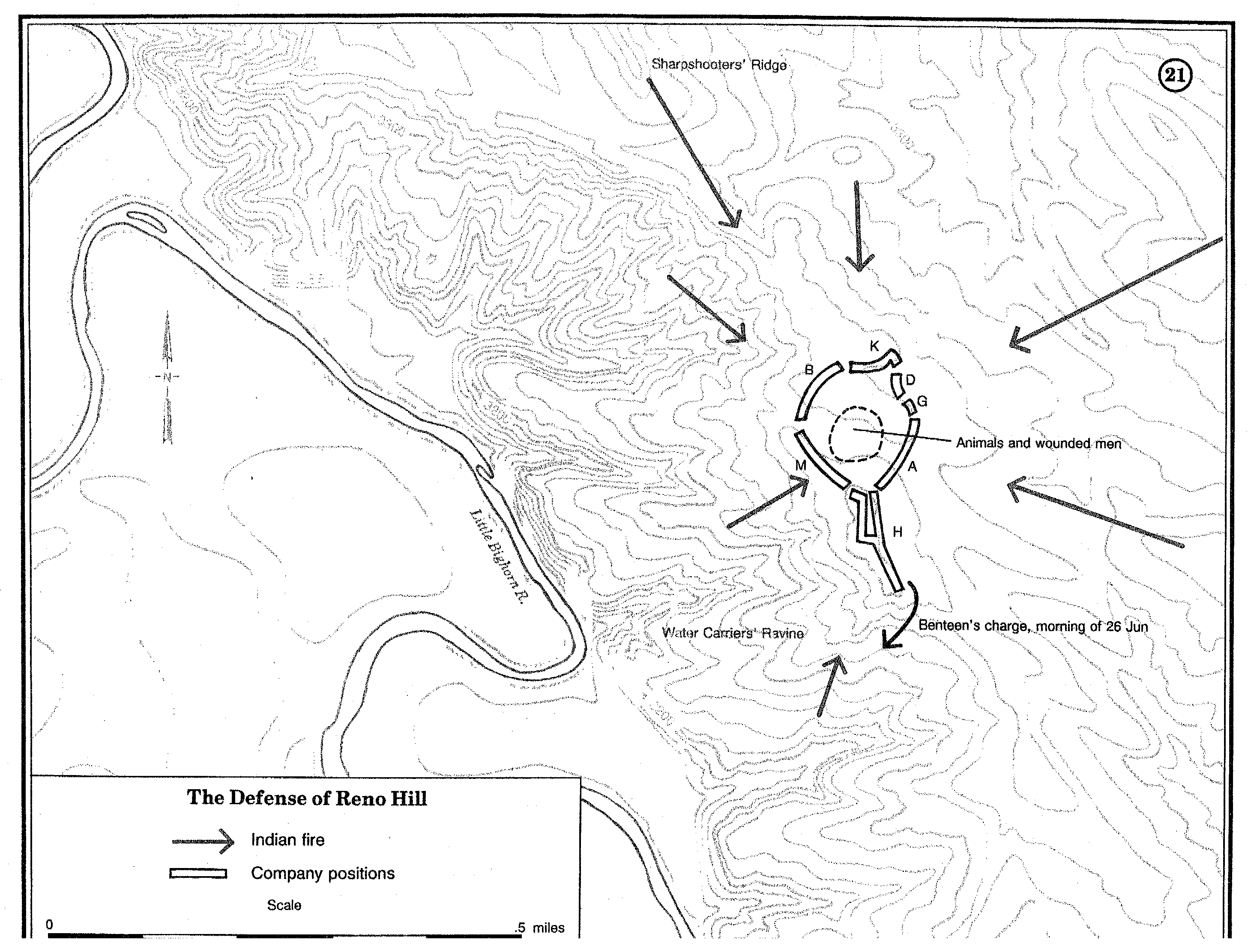
The Defense of Reno Hill

From May to September 1876, the 7th Cavalry, including Edgerly, participated in the Sioux Expedition. Edgerly was promoted to first lieutenant in the 7th Cavalry effective June 25, 1876. The regiment was engaged in the Battle of the Little Bighorn on June 26–27, 1876. Edgerly was the second in command of Company D, serving under Captain Thomas Weir; Company D was assigned to Captain Frederick Benteen's Battalion. Prior to the battle, Lieutenant Colonel George Armstrong Custer was discussing upcoming events with his junior officers; Edgerly expressed enthusiasm about the possibility of success; Custer replied that success depended on the "young officers." Edgerly later expressed a concern that he would not arrive at the front before the fighting had ended. At about 12:15 p.m. on June 25, Benteen's battalion separated as ordered from the remainder of the regiment and proceeded at an angle of approximately 45 degrees from the regiment's route of march; Benteen's mission was to intercept any Sans Arc warriors who attempted to escape from their village. The battalion passed through hilly terrain, and Benteen deployed scouts to look for native warriors. Sometime after 4:00 p.m., Benteen and his battalion encountered Major Marcus Reno and his battalion on a bluff now known as Reno Hill. Reno assumed command of the entire force and established a defensive position; at this time neither Reno nor Benteen was aware of Custer's status or location. A short time later, Weir realized that a large cloud of dust represented Custer's battle and asked Edgerly if he thought Company D should proceed toward Custer; Edgerly responded that it should. Reno ordered Weir to remain; Weir and Company D did make a short reconnaissance along a ridge to a promontory later called Weir Peak. As the company was falling back to the enclave, the company farrier was shot out of his saddle; Edgerly refused to rescue him but promised to return later; he never did. The troopers in the defensive enclave took fire from Native American warriors until late in the evening. With little sleep, the battalion had fought three separate engagements in six hours. That night, Edgerly managed to get some sleep, which surprised Reno. On June 26, Benteen's battalion continued to defend against attacks and parties of volunteers went down to the river for water; the idea of sending a message to ask for help was posed but proved unnecessary when the Sioux and Cheyenne broke camp and left. The battalion remained in or near its position for an additional night and learned on the morning of June 27 that Custer and the men fighting with him had all been killed. Edgerly also served as the regimental quartermaster from June 25 to November 14, 1876.

=== Frontier and Wounded Knee Massacre ===
After the Sioux Expedition, Edgerly continued his service on the frontier; postings included Fort Abraham Lincoln (twice) and Fort Totten in addition to protecting the stagecoach road between Fort Abraham Lincoln and Deadwood, Dakota Territory and general scouting duties. From November 1878 to April 1879, Edgerly served as a witness at the court of inquiry at Chicago, Illinois, into Reno's actions at Little Big Horn; Edgerly was recalled twice during the proceedings. After the inquiry, Edgerly returned to frontier duty, including supervising the ordnance depot and Fort Abraham Lincoln, service at Fort Yates, Dakota Territory and a period inspecting cavalry horses. He served as a recruiting officer from January 1883 to October 1884. He was promoted to captain in the 7th Cavalry on September 22, 1883.

In 1881, Edgerly and his wife had their only child, Winifred, who died at age three and one-half during 1885.

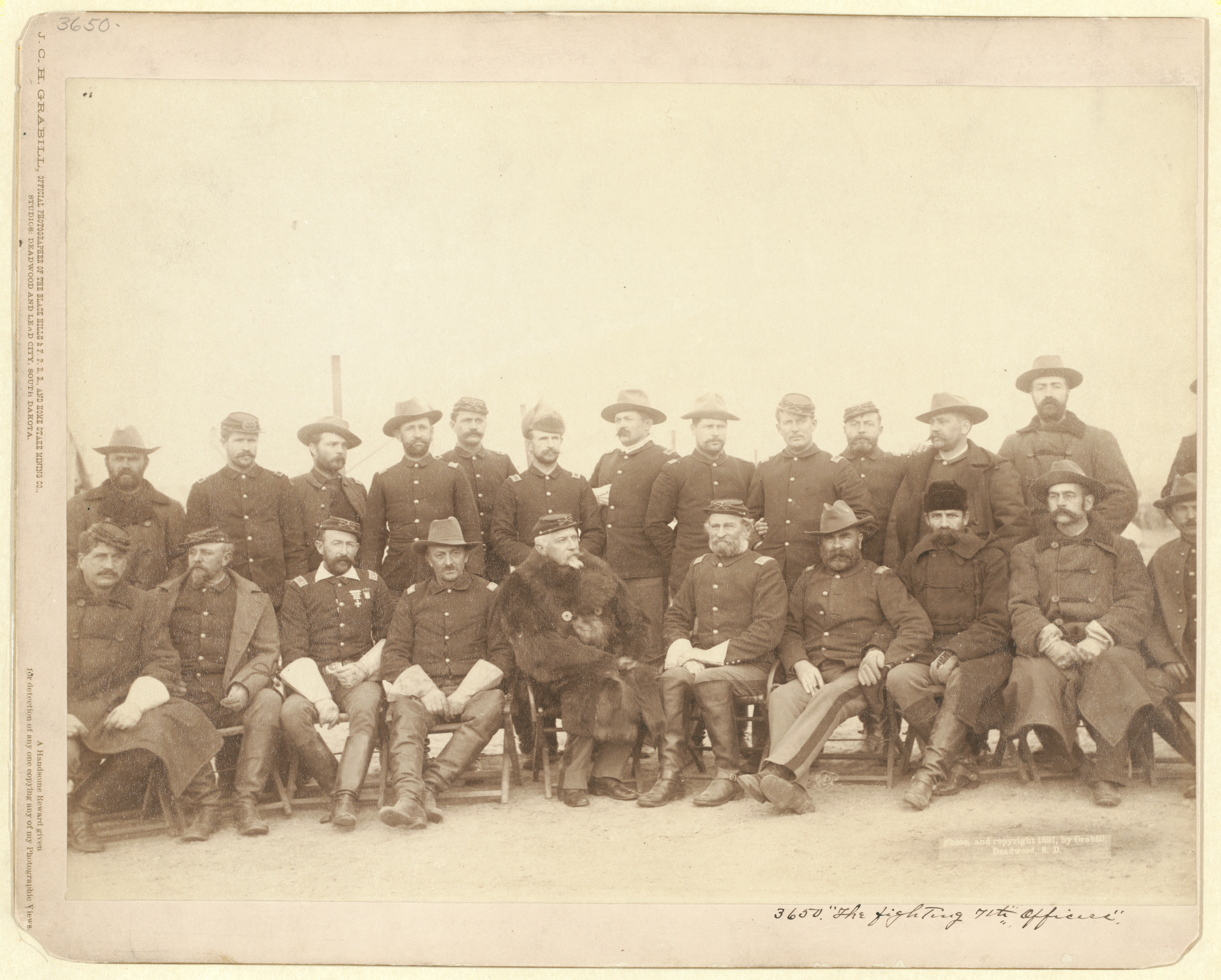
Edgerly (front row left) with the officers of the Fighting 7th (January 1891)

Edgerly commanded Company G, 7th Cavalry during the Wounded Knee Massacre on December 28, 1890. One of his non-commissioned officers was Sergeant Frederick E. Toy, whom Edgerly recommended be awarded the Medal of Honor "for bravery displayed while shooting hostile Indians." The wording was changed on the final citation of Toy's award.

After Wounded Knee, Edgerly was assigned to other posts in the west. He was assigned professor of military science at Maine State College during the 1895–1896 school year. His next assignment was duty with the National Guard of New Hampshire and as the U.S. mustering officer for New Hampshire from approximately Summer 1896 until June 1898.

=== Spanish–American War ===
Edgerly was promoted to lieutenant colonel, U.S. Volunteers on June 8, 1898, and concurrently appointed as inspector general. Edgerly was assigned to the 2d Army Corps from June 25, 1898, until its disbandment; during that period he served as inspector general and acting inspector general (in that order) and for several months as commissary of musters. While serving as a lieutenant colonel with the U.S. Volunteers, Edgerly was promoted to major of cavalry, 6th Cavalry Regiment, July 9, 1898, and was transferred to the 7th Cavalry Regiment on January 5, 1899. He was honorably discharged from the Volunteers on April 12, 1899.

Edgerly was assigned to Cuba in November 1899. In January 1900, he was serving as a major with the 7th Cavalry Regiment at Columbia Barracks in Quemados, Cuba. He was promoted to lieutenant colonel in the 10th Cavalry Regiment on February 19, 1901, but served as a squadron commander of the 7th Cavalry until May 1902. He performed inspector general duties and investigated Spanish war claims. He returned to the U.S. for duty with the 7th Cavalry from July 1902 to February 1903. He was promoted to colonel in the 2nd Cavalry Regiment in April 1903. He commanded Fort Myer, Virginia until December 1903, leaving that post for duty in the Philippines.

=== Philippine Islands ===
Edgerly served in the Philippines from February 1904 until January 1907. During this period, he commanded Camp Wallace de Union, Camp Stotsenburg and Camp McKinley. He was promoted to brigadier general on June 23, 1905.

=== Final years ===
After he returned to the U.S., Edgerly commanded the Department of the Gulf from March to July 1907 after which he was detailed to observe the Kaiser Maneuvers in Germany. He was assigned to various boards in Washington, D.C., after returning from Germany. He then commanded the Department of Dakota and the Cavalry and Artillery School. Edgerly began a leave of absence on September 29, 1909; the leave ended with his retirement for disability in the line of duty on December 29, 1909.

== Memberships ==
- The New Hampshire Society of the Sons of the American Revolution.
- The Army and Navy Club in Washington, D.C.

== Later life and death ==
When he retired from the Army, Edgerly returned to New Hampshire. After the U.S. entry into World War I, he served as a member of a military emergency board in New Hampshire and commanded a mobilization camp in Concord, New Hampshire from July through September 1917, his last active service. He died on September 10, 1927, and is buried in Arlington National Cemetery, Arlington, Virginia; he was survived by his wife who resided in Washington, D.C.

== Awards ==
| Indian Campaign Medal |
| Spanish War Service Medal |
| Army of Cuban Occupation Medal |
| Philippine Campaign Medal |
| World War I Victory Medal |
