= Frederick E. Toy =

American soldier (1866–1933)

- Born: 1866; Buffalo, New York, U.S.
- Died: August 5, 1933 (aged 66–67); Lewiston, New York, U.S.
- Burial place: Riverdale Cemetery
- Spouses: Alice Morrow (m. 1893; died 1927) Margaret Hood Crawford (m. 1928)
- Military career
- Allegiance: United States
- Branch: United States Army
- Service years: 1883–1910; 1917–1919
- Rank: Captain
- Units: 7th Cavalry Regiment; 303d Stevedore Regiment
- Conflicts: Sioux Wars: Wounded Knee Massacre; Spanish–American War; World War I
- Awards: Medal of Honor
- Other work: employment manager; railroad police

Frederick Ernest Toy (1860s – August 5, 1933) was a soldier in the U.S. Army during the Indian and Spanish–American Wars; During his enlisted service, he was assigned to the 7th Cavalry Regiment until promoted to ordnance sergeant and served at a variety of posts. He received the Medal of Honor for bravery at the Battle of Wounded Knee, but now called the Wounded Knee Massacre, against the Dakota Indians on December 29, 1890. Toy retired from the Army in 1910. He was recalled and commissioned as a captain during World War I. He worked as an employment manager and as a railroad police officer.

== Early life ==
Toy was born in Buffalo, New York in the early– to mid–1860s to Ernst and Catherine Toy. The 1870 U.S. Census shows his given name as Fred and his estimated birth year as 1864–1865. He was educated in the Buffalo public schools. The 1880 U.S. Census shows his given name as Friedrich and his estimated birth year as 1865. The record of his first enlistment shows his estimated year of birth as 1862. The Hall of Valor shows his birth year as 1866.

== Enlisted Army career ==
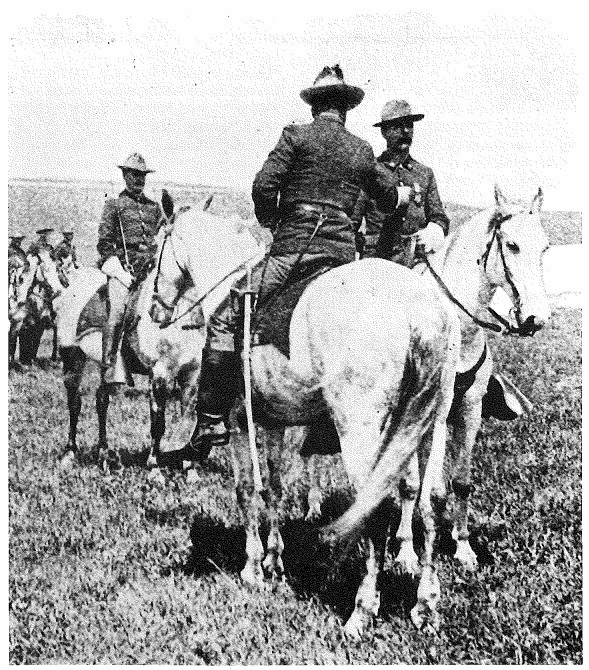
Sergeant Toy (on the right) receiving the Medal of Honor at Fort Riley, Kansas, 1891.

Frederick Toy was a career enlisted soldier, serving from 1883 to 1910. All of his enlisted terms of service ended with the expiration of his term of service and with character evaluations of "excellent." All of Toy's service was with Troop G, 7th Cavalry Regiment until he was promoted to ordnance sergeant.

Toy first enlisted on October 16, 1883 at Chicago, Illinois; his enlistment record reflects the given name of Frederick and his age as 21 (birth year 1861 or 1862). In April 1888, Toy was promoted from corporal to sergeant while assigned to Fort Leavenworth, Kansas. On September 15, 1888, Toy was discharged as a sergeant at Fort Leavenworth, Kansas.

Toy reenlisted on October 16, 1888 at Fort Riley, Kansas. He was among the cavalrymen ordered to capture Chief Big Foot. On December 29, 1890, troopers surrounded the Sioux camp on Wounded Knee Creek with the intention of arresting the Sioux chieftain and disarming his followers. Toy, a sergeant on the day of the battle, was commanded by Captain Winfield Scott Edgerly. Toy was one of nineteen men awarded the Medal of Honor for their actions that day. Toy was cited for "bravery displayed while shooting hostile Indians;" It was changed on the final citation after being returned by the War Department. Captain Edgerly said Sergeant Toy did "deliberately aim at and hit two Indians who had run into the ravine." Toy was presented the medal in a public ceremony, which was featured in Harper's Weekly. He also attained the rank of first sergeant by the time his Medal of Honor was awarded on May 26, 1891. The appropriateness of the award of the Medal of Honor to Toy, as well as to the others awarded for Wounded Knee, was challenged more than 100 years later. Toy was discharged at Fort Clark, Texas.

In early November 1893, Toy and Alice Marrow (sic) were married in Junction City, Kansas; the Toys expected to proceed to Fort Clark, Texas. First Sergeant Toy reenlisted on November 15, 1893 at Fort Riley. First Sergeant Toy was discharged at Camp Forse, Alabama. On November 15, 1898, Toy reenlisted at Huntsville, Alabama. He was discharged at Columbia Barracks, Cuba.

Toy reenlisted on November 15, 1901 at Columbia Barracks. On June 4, 1903, Toy, who had been promoted from first sergeant to ordnance sergeant on June 2, 1903, was ordered to proceed from Camp George H. Thomas, Georgia to Fort Sheridan, Illinois. He was discharged as an ordnance sergeant while assigned to Fort Sheridan. Toy immediately reenlisted at Fort Sheridan on November 15, 1904. He was discharged, again as an ordnance sergeant, at Madison Barracks, New York. Toy reenlisted on November 15, 1907 as an ordnance sergeant at Madison Barracks. On October 13, 1908, the War Department ordered Toy, then at Madison Barracks, to report to Fort Niagara, New York for duty. In the 1910 U.S. Census, Toy is shown to be living at Fort Niagara while serving as an "O.S." in the U.S. Army. He retired from the Army on October 15, 1910 as an ordnance sergeant by authority of War Department Special Orders 239 dated October 12, 1910.

During his career, Toy served as an orderly to President Theodore Roosevelt.

== Commissioned Army career ==
During World War I, Toy was among retired Regular Army personnel who were recalled to serve as trainers; he was commissioned as a captain in the Quartermaster Corps and assigned to the 303d Stevedore Regiment; he returned to his Niagara Falls, New York home on July 18, 1919 and anticipated mustering out of the U.S. Army during August 1919. He served as a transportation quartermaster in Brest, France. He reverted to the rank of master sergeant after the war; a special act of Congress restored him to the rank of captain without increasing his retired pay. In the 1920 U.S. Census, his occupation is reflected as "Captain, U.S. Army." Toy, identified as a major, commanded the Special Troops, 98th Infantry Division (part of the Organized Reserve of New York State) from March 26, 1922 to November 10, 1924. Toy, again identified as a major, was ordered to attend training camp from July 15 through August 2, 1922.

== Later life and death ==
After his military service, Toy was employed as the employment manager of the Aluminum Company of America and later as a lieutenant for the New York Central Railroad Company police. In December 1921, Toy was a candidate for chief of police of Niagara Falls. Toy was a member of Camp number 7 of the United Spanish War Veterans He also joined the Niagara Frontier Chapter of the Military Order of the World War. He died on August 5, 1933, and is buried at Riverdale Cemetery in Lewiston, New York. Toy's grave marker identifies him as a captain.

== Awards ==
Medal of Honor
Indian Campaign Medal
Spanish War Service Medal
Army of Cuban Occupation Medal
World War I Victory Medal

== Medal of Honor citation ==
Rank and organization: First Sergeant, Troop G, 7th U.S. Cavalry. Place and date: At Wounded Knee Creek, S. Dak., 29 December 1890. Entered service at:--. Birth: Buffalo, N.Y. Date of issue: 26 May 1891.

Citation

The President of the United States of America, in the name of Congress, takes pleasure in presenting the Medal of Honor to First Sergeant Frederick Ernest Toy, United States Army, for bravery on 29 December 1890, while serving with Company G, 7th U.S. Cavalry, in action at Wounded Knee Creek, South Dakota.

=== Controversy ===
Mass Grave for the Dead Lakota After the Engagement at Wounded Knee

There have been several attempts by various parties to rescind the Medals of Honor awarded in connection with the Wounded Knee Massacre. Proponents claim that the engagement was in-fact a massacre and not a battle, due to the high number of killed and wounded Lakota women and children and the very one-sided casualty counts. Estimates of the Lakota losses indicate 150–300 killed, of which up to 200 were women and children. Additionally, as many as 51 were wounded. In contrast, the 7th Cavalry suffered 25 killed and 39 wounded, many being the result of friendly fire.

Calvin Spotted Elk, direct descendant of Chief Spotted Elk killed at Wounded Knee, launched a petition to rescind medals from the soldiers who participated in the battle.

The Army has also been criticized more generally for the seemingly disproportionate number of Medals of Honor awarded in connection with the battle. For comparison, 19 Medals were awarded at Wounded Knee, 21 at the Battle of Cedar Creek, and 20 at the Battle of Antietam. Respectively, Cedar Creek and Antietam involved 52,712 and 113,000 troops, suffering 8,674 and 22,717 casualties. Wounded Knee, however, involved 610 combatants and resulted in as many as 705 casualties (including non-combatants).

== Honors ==
Frederick Toy's name is memorialized on side C of the Medal of Honor monument in Niagara Falls State Park.

== See also ==
- List of Medal of Honor recipients for the Indian Wars
