= Military Order of the World Wars =

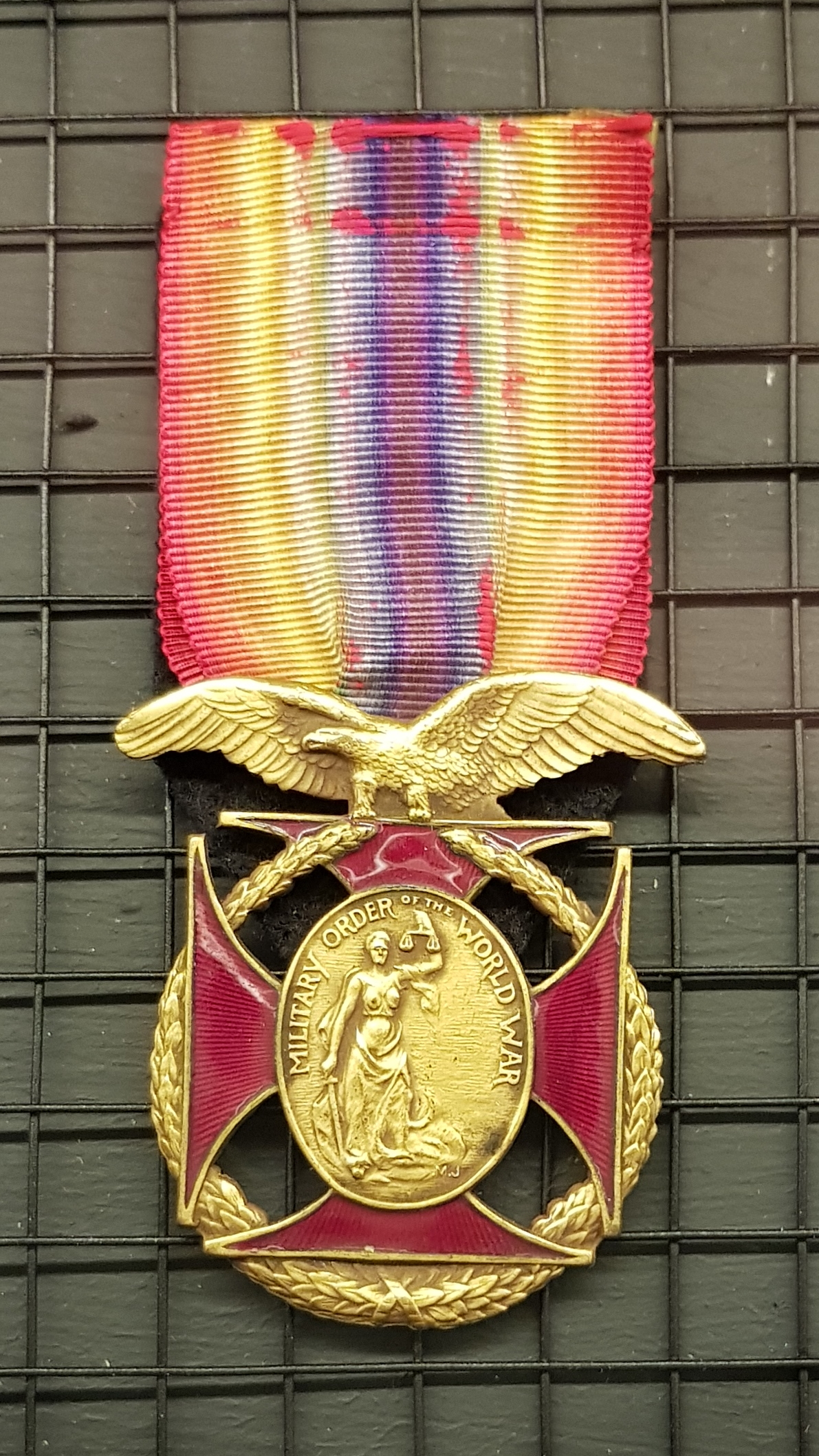
Insignia of the order awarded to Polish Gen. Józef Haller.

The Military Order of the World Wars (MOWW) is an American social organization of military officers of the United States and their descendants. It was created in 1919 as the Military Order of the World War at the suggestion of General of the Armies John J. Pershing as a fraternity for American military officers coming out of World War I. Two decades later, when the United States became involved in World War II, the conflict reference was pluralized to its current title of Military Order of the World Wars. Though the society's title has not been changed since 1945, it accepts additional members from other conflicts and non-conflict service, including those in current military service, retired military service, and former military service. It also accepts members who are lineal descendants from a qualifying officer and family members within two degrees of consanguinity as hereditary members.

== Overview and history ==
The MOWW is a 501(c)19 non-profit organization with a congressional charter.

At its founding, the MOWW chose Major General George Herbert Harries as commander, and he served through 1925. Membership in the MOWW is open to active duty, retired and honorably discharged veterans of the uniformed services of the United States. This includes the US Army (USA), US Navy (USN), US Marine Corps (USMC), US Air Force (USAF), US Coast Guard (USCG), US Space Force (USSF), US National Guard, US Military Reserves, United States Public Health Service (USPHS), and the National Oceanographic and Atmospheric Administration (NOAA). Additionally, any direct lineal descendant and family members within two degrees of consanguinity (i.e., spouse, son/step-son, daughter/step-daughter, grandson/granddaughter) from a qualifying officer may also join the order as a hereditary member; and thus the order also serves as a genealogical society.

== Centennial anniversary and projects in 2019 ==
In 2019 the Order celebrated its 100th birthday at its annual convention held in Simi Valley, California. Recent projects in 2019 included the design, purchase, and placement of a $100k Augusta-CSRA Vietnam War Veterans Memorial, in Augusta, Georgia, by the Augusta Chapter of Region V, MOWW, earning Chapter leaders a Gold Patrick Henry Award and National Citation.

== Awards and insignia ==
- Gold Patrick Henry Award – awarded by the national chapter annually to nine companions of the Order for exceptional achievement.
- Silver Patrick Henry Award – awarded by local chapters to companions for superior service, lifesaving, and more. Can also be awarded to non-companions for service to the Order.
- Bronze Patrick Henry Award – awarded by local chapters to exceptional youth for patriotic achievement.
- Outstanding Service Medal – awarded by local chapters for holding a key leadership role in the Order for at least three years.
- Outreach Service Medal – awarded by local chapters for exceptional participation in the various MOWW outreach programs (e.g. Eagle Scout recognition, Gold Award recognition, ROTC/JROTC recognition, law enforcement recognition, et cetera).
- Youth Merit Medal – awarded by local chapters and individual companions to youth for achievement.
- Membership Medal – worn by companions as the badge of the Order, which consists of the emblem suspended from a mini rainbow ribbon of reversed colors from the WWI Victory Medal.

Multiple awards of the decorations are denoted by mini-medal sized bronze oak leaf clusters. On the membership medal, perpetual (life) membership is denoted by a silver service star.

== Awards presented to people in other organizations ==
Awards presented by the MOWW include:

- JROTC Award of Merit – presented to the best first year, second year, and third year cadet in a JROTC battalion each class year. Multiple awards denoted by silver service stars.
- ROTC Award of Merit – presented to the best first year (bronze), second year (silver), and third year (gold) cadet in a ROTC battalion each class year. As there is a different ribbon for each ROTC program year, multiple awards to the same cadet are not possible (though a single exceptional cadet could earn the different awards).
- Eagle Scout Certificate – presented to members of the Boy Scouts of America who have earned the Eagle Scout rank.
- Summit Certificate – presented to members of the Boy Scouts of America who have earned the Venturing Summit rank.
- Quartermaster Certificate – presented to members of the Boy Scouts of America who have earned the Sea Scout Quartermaster rank.
- Gold Award Certificate – presented to members of the Girl Scouts of the USA who have earned the Gold Award.

== Notable members ==
- Frederick M. Alger Jr., politician and diplomat
- Reginald R. Belknap, military officer
- Joseph Bondy, politician
- Charles W. Berry, public official
- John Jewsbury Bradley, military officer
- Ames T. Brown, adjutant general of New York
- William Bryden, military officer
- William Banks Caperton, military officer
- Fred Henry Davis, politician and lawyer
- Louis Joseph Fortier, military officer
- William R. Furlong, military officer
- Harry Goldstein, politician
- Carter Harrison IV, politician and newspaper publisher
- George Herbert Harries, politician and newspaper publisher
- Mark L. Hersey, military officer
- Harold J. Lavell, military officer
- Ernest Lester Jones, engineer
- Jack P. Juhan military officer
- Frank C. Lang, military officer
- Robert McC. Marsh, judge and politician
- Perry L. Miles, military officer
- John J. Pershing, military officer
- Simon Pierre Robineau, politician
- Patrick J. Ryan, military officer and Catholic priest
- William F. Tompkins, military officer
- Frederick E. Toy, soldier
- Franklin W. Ward, military officer
- Phyllis J. Wilson, military officer

== Related organizations ==
- Society of the Cincinnati, for officers of the War of the Revolution and or one male descendant representing each such officer (est. 1783)
- Aztec Club of 1847, for officers of the Mexican–American War and their male descendants (invitation-only, est. 1847)
- Military Order of the Loyal Legion of the United States, for Union officers of the Civil War and their male descendants based on male descent (est. 1865)
- Military Order of the Stars and Bars, for Confederate officers of the Civil War and their male descendants (est. 1936)
- Military Order of Foreign Wars, for officers of any foreign war and their descendants (excluding those who are only officers of the Civil War or Indian Wars, est. 1894)
- Order of the Indian Wars of the United States, for officers of the Indian Wars and their male descendants (invitation-only, est. 1896)

The six organizations listed above, like the MOWW, include male direct lineal descendants of qualifying officers of their respective war(s), although two of them accept members by invitation only. At least one (the Society of the Cincinnati) limits its membership to one person representing each qualifying officer. Only the MOWW does not require the officer to have been a veteran during a combat conflict. Among these, only the MOWW and Military Order of Foreign Wars accept women as members.

Former related organizations with veteran-only membership include:

- Grand Army of the Republic, for Union officers of the Civil War, dissolved in 1956
- United Confederate Veterans, for Confederate officers of the Civil War, dissolved in 1951
