= Battlefield cross =

Temporary memorial of a military person's hat, rifle, and boots

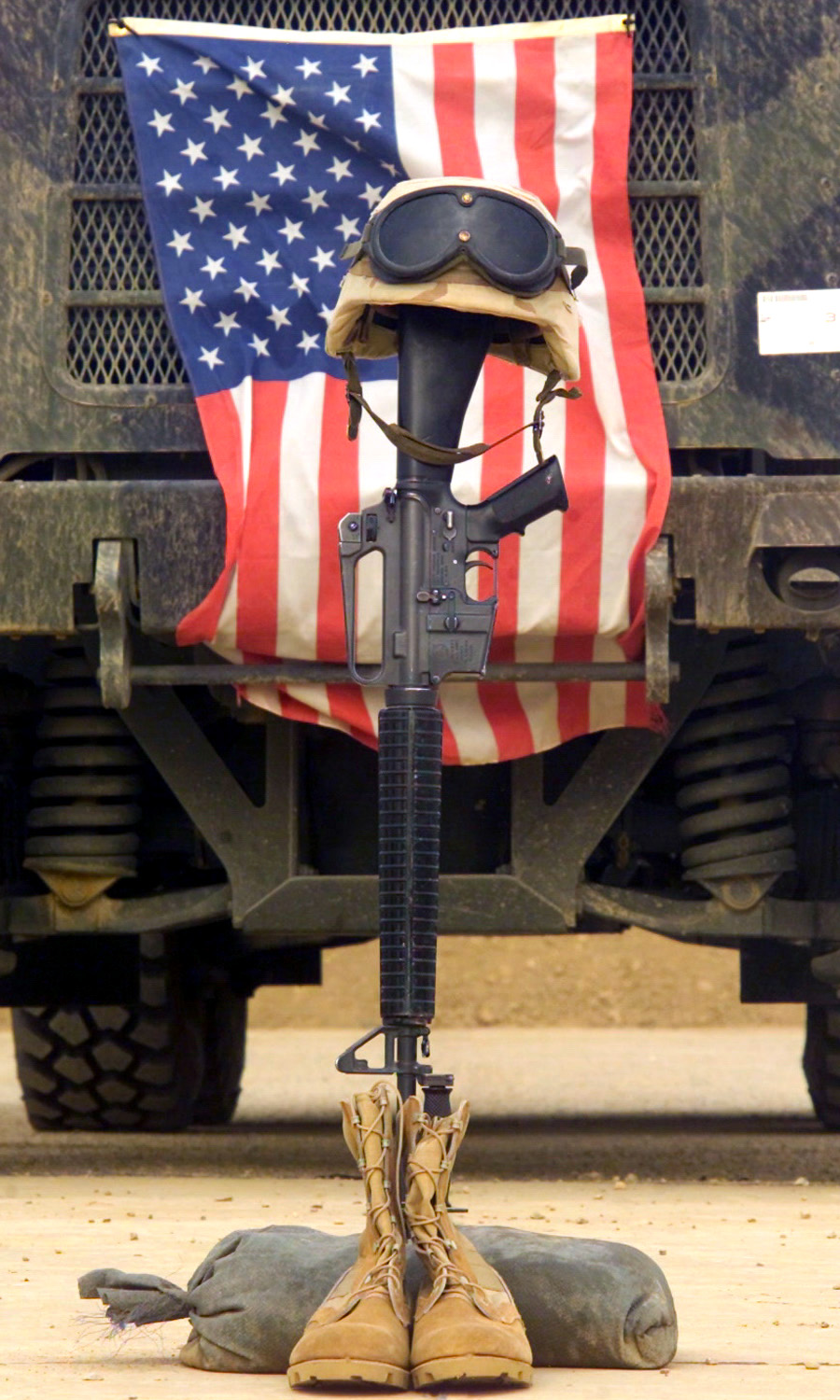
Helmet, rifle and boots forming a battle cross for a fallen Marine.

The Battlefield Cross, alternatively referred to as the Fallen Soldier Battlefield Cross, Soldier's Cross, or just Battle Cross, is a symbolic replacement of a cross, or memorial marker appropriate to an individual service-member's religion, on the battlefield or at the base camp for a soldier who has been killed. It is made up of the soldier's rifle stuck into the ground or the soldier's boots, with a helmet on top. Dog tags are sometimes placed on the rifle, and the boots of the dead soldier can be placed next to the rifle. The purpose is to show honor and respect for the dead at the battle site. The practice started during World War I, as a sign of respect for those that gave their lives in combat during wartime. Today, it is a means of showing respect for the dead amongst the still-living troop members. It is commonly seen in the field or base camp after a battle, especially among American troops in Afghanistan or Iraq. While it is used less today as a means of identification, it still serves as a method of mourning among the living, as attending the funeral is not always possible for soldiers still in combat.

== United States Army ==
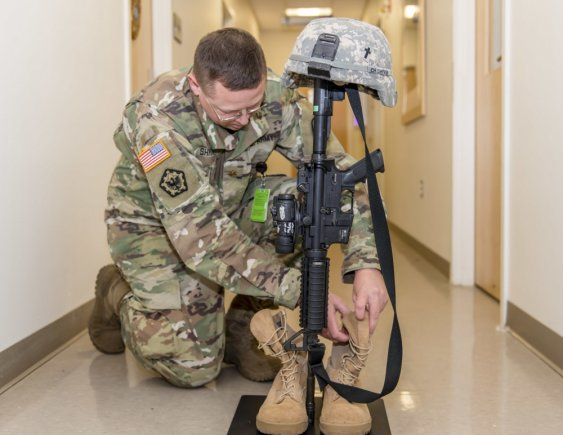
Demonstration of Individual Soldier Memorial for use by the Soldier's unit, meant to facilitate the healing process. Demonstration includes helmet, boots, rifle, and dog tags mounted on a memorial stand.

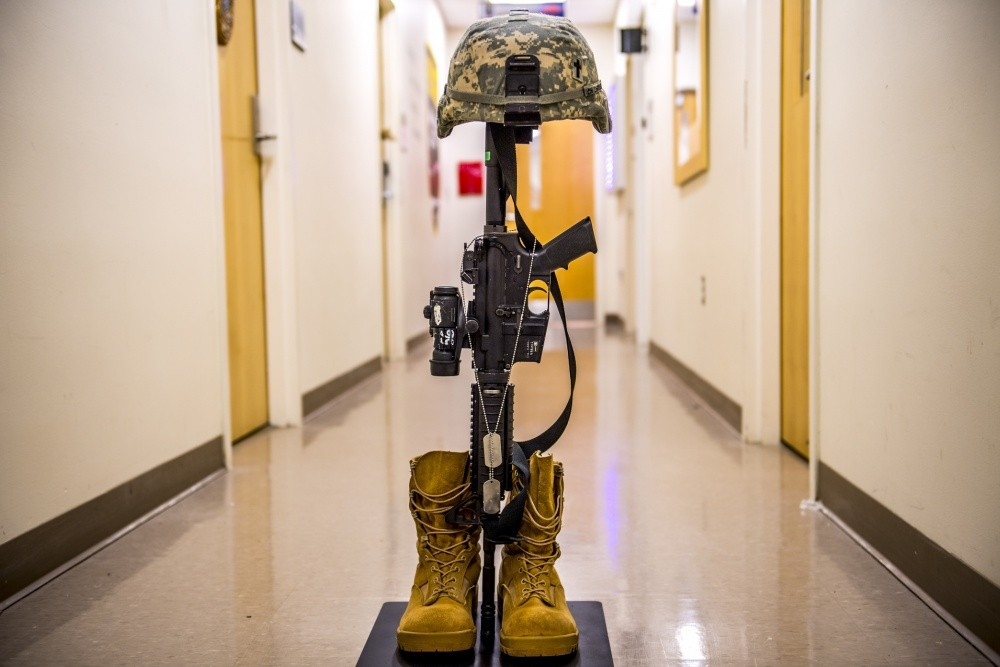
Expeditionary Memorial Rifle Stand. Does not include the helmet, boots, rifle, or dog tags that are to be mounted on the memorial stand during the ceremony. See III, C-6 (left)

This ceremony is described in US Army Field Manual (FM) No. 7-21.13, entitled "The Soldiers Guide", Appendix C "Ceremonies", Section III "Memorial Ceremony", excerpted as follows:

SECTION III – MEMORIAL CEREMONY

C-4. Memorial ceremonies are patriotic tributes to deceased soldiers. These ceremonies are command-oriented so attendance is often mandatory. The ceremony is a military function that is not normally conducted in a chapel. The content of the ceremony may vary depending on the desires of the commander.

C-5. In most cases, the unit prepares a program that may include a biographical summary of the deceased soldier with mention of awards and decorations. The following elements are commonly part of a memorial ceremony:

- Prelude (often suitable music).
- Posting of the Colors.
- National Anthem.
- Invocation.
- Memorial Tribute (e.g., remarks by unit commander or a friend of the deceased).
- Scripture Reading.
- Hymn or other special music.
- Meditation (quiet moment for attendees to reflect).
- Benediction.
- Last Roll Call. This is a final tribute paid by soldiers to their dead comrade. It has its origin in the accountability roll call conducted by the unit First Sergeant following combat. Although sometimes painful to listen through, the Last Roll is called with the conviction held by soldiers that all unit members will be accounted for, and none will ever be forgotten.
- Firing of rifle volleys.
- Taps.

C-6. Most units prepare a visible reminder of the deceased soldier similar to that depicted in Figure C-1. The helmet and identification tags signify the dead soldier. The inverted rifle with bayonet signals a time for prayer, a break in the action to pay tribute to our comrade. The combat boots represent the final march of the last battle. The beret (in the case of soldiers from airborne units) reminds us that the soldier has taken part in his final jump.

== In sculpture ==
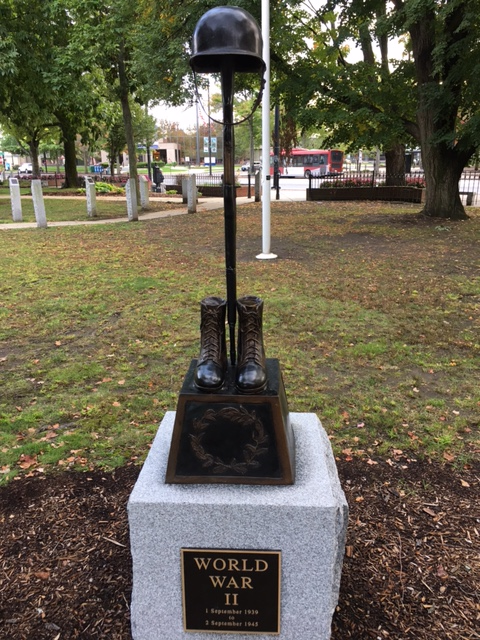
Bronze sculpture of a Battlefield Cross in Manchester, New Hampshire, representing a fallen American soldier of World War II

=== Del City, Oklahoma ===
At Patriot Park, there is what is described as a "Soldier's Cross" cast in bronze. Beside the bronze Battlefield Cross there are two steel silhouettes of soldiers kneeling and paying their respects to the Battlefield Cross sculpture and the fallen soldier that it represents. This sculpture was installed on November 11, 2008.

=== Fresno, California ===
There is a bronze sculpture of the Battlefield Cross at the Veterans of Foreign Wars (VFW) Post 8900. The artist who created it is also a veteran. The plaque at the base reads: "The Fallen Veteran Memorial." There is also a Battlefield Cross Memorial at La Sierra Military Academy.

=== Manchester, New Hampshire ===
Three separate Battlefield Crosses are on public display permanently located at Veteran's Park on Elm Street in Manchester, New Hampshire. One for World War II, one for the Vietnam War, and one for what is described on the placard as "current conflicts", which is dated from September 11, 2001 – Present. Another display sign describes the meaning of the three Battlefield Crosses and the Battlefield Cross in particular as, "The Battlefield Cross is a symbolic representation of a cross for a soldier who has been killed in battle. This tradition originated during World War I and has continued in every conflict since. The crosses are erected by comrades in arms to show honor and respect for the brave souls who gave their lives in service to their country." This text is followed on the main display sign by four bullet points outlining, "The Meaning Behind A Battlefield Cross": "1. The rifle with fixed bayonet pointing into the ground symbolizes a fallen soldier in battle, 2. The boots represent the final march of the last battle, 3. The helmet and dog tags are items the soldier has no further need for, and lastly, 4. The price of freedom is visible here."

There are plans to eventually build out Battlefield Crosses in Manchester's Veteran's Park for both World War I as well as the Korean War, but more money still needs to be raised. So far around $12,000 was raised towards the sculpting and installation of the existing Battlefield Cross sculptures.

== See also ==
- Reverse arms
