= 209th Field Artillery Brigade =

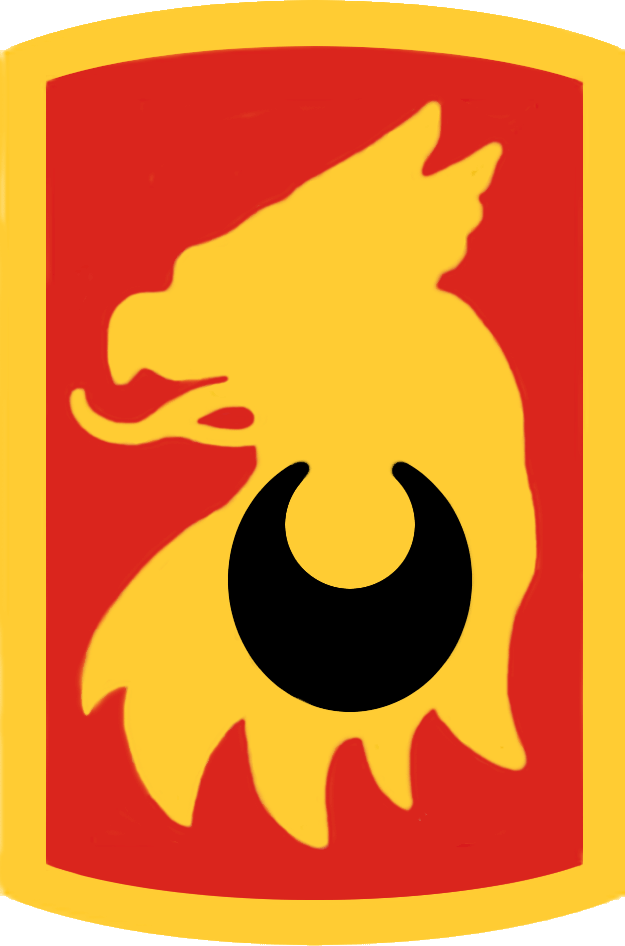
- Active: unknown
- Country: United States
- Allegiance: New York
- Branch: Army National Guard
- Role: Field Artillery
- Size: Brigade
- Garrison/HQ: Rochester, New York
- Motto: Hoofbeats To Howitzers

Insignia
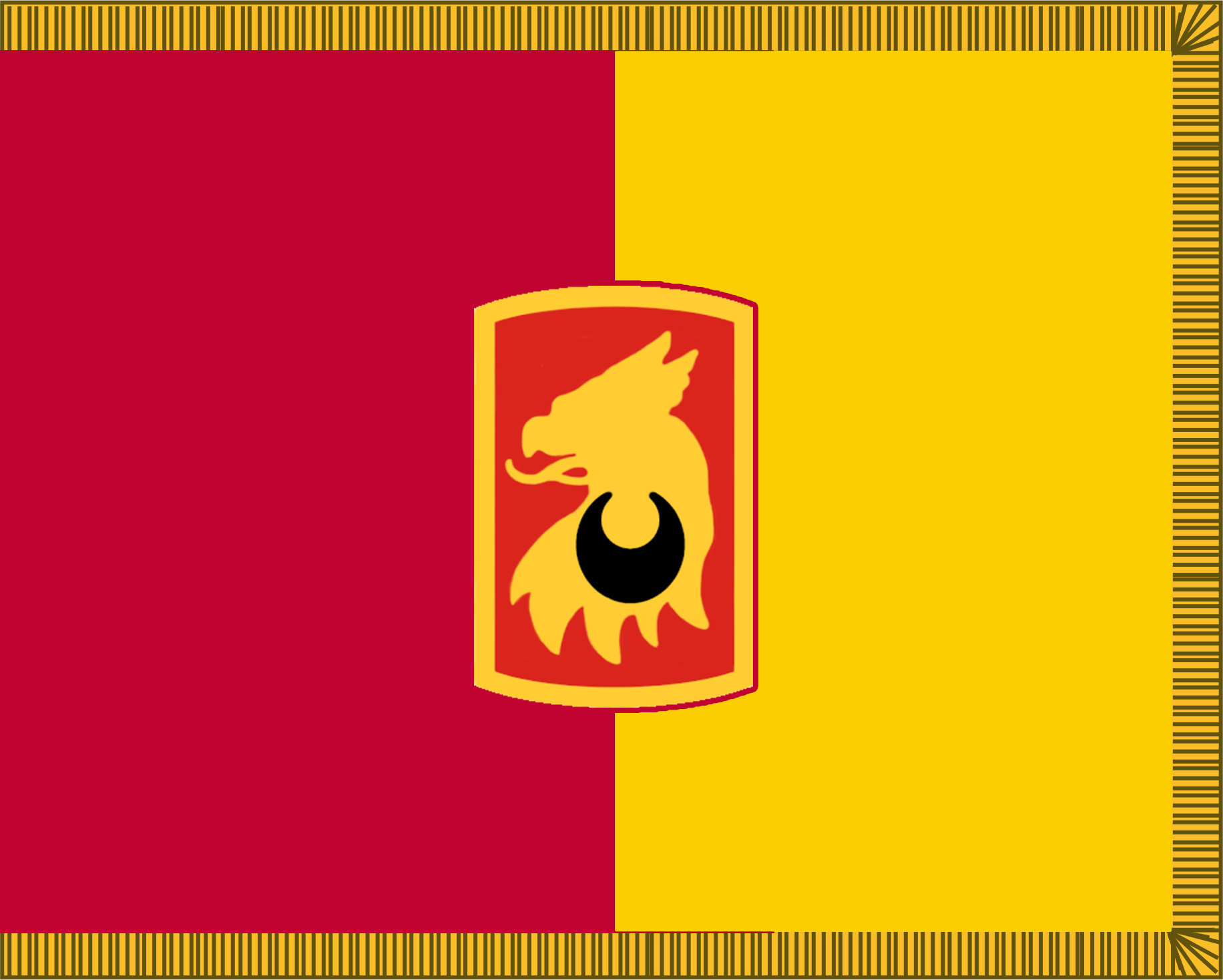
- 209th Field Artillery Brigade Flag

The 209th Field Artillery Brigade "Rochester Redlegs" was a unit of the New York National Guard from World War II until at least the late 1970s. The unit has been deactivated, but there are no records that show when that happened. The unit's lineage runs through the 121st Cavalry Regiment which merged briefly in 1929 with the 101st Cavalry Regiment. In 1940 part of the unit was redesignated and merged with the 209th Coast Artillery Regiment (Antiaircraft), this is the likely beginning of the Brigade's motto "Hoofbeats to Howitzers" as the cavalry regiment became an artillery unit. The Brigade earned battle streamers in World War II in Tunisia, Naples-Foggia, Rome-Arno, North Apennines, and the Po Valley. The Brigade's DUI was approved in 1970 and its SSI in 1978 by the Institute of heraldry, but there are no records of when the unit ceased to exist.
