= Reverse arms =

Military drill command

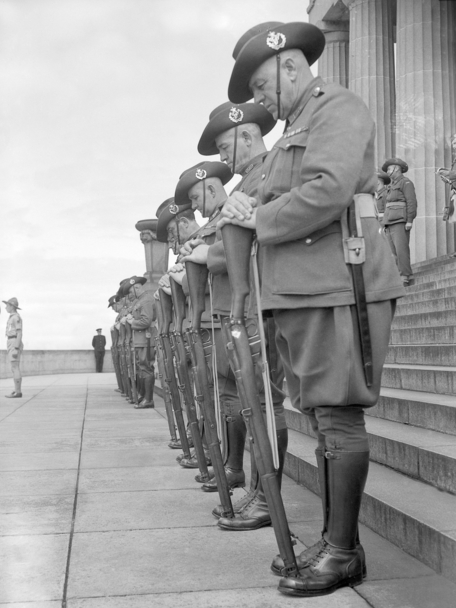
Australian guard of honour on Remembrance Day 1943, resting on arms reversed

Reverse arms and the related rest on arms reversed are military drill commands used as a mark of respect at funerals and on occasions of mourning, especially in the armed forces of Commonwealth nations. When marching in reverse arms the soldier's weapon is held pointing behind them and grasped behind their back. When resting on reversed arms the weapon points towards the ground and the eyes are lowered.

== History ==
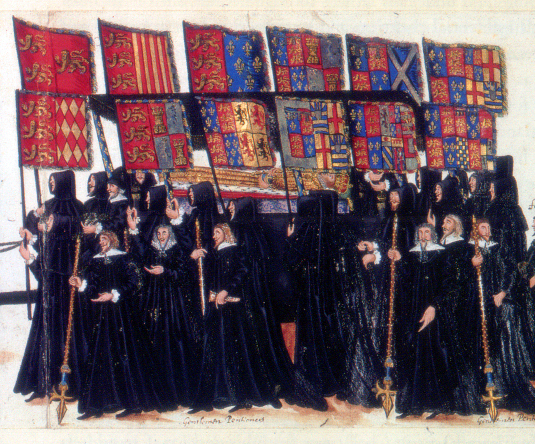
Gentlemen Pensioners pictured with their axes reversed, walking alongside the coffin at the State Funeral of Elizabeth I, 1603.

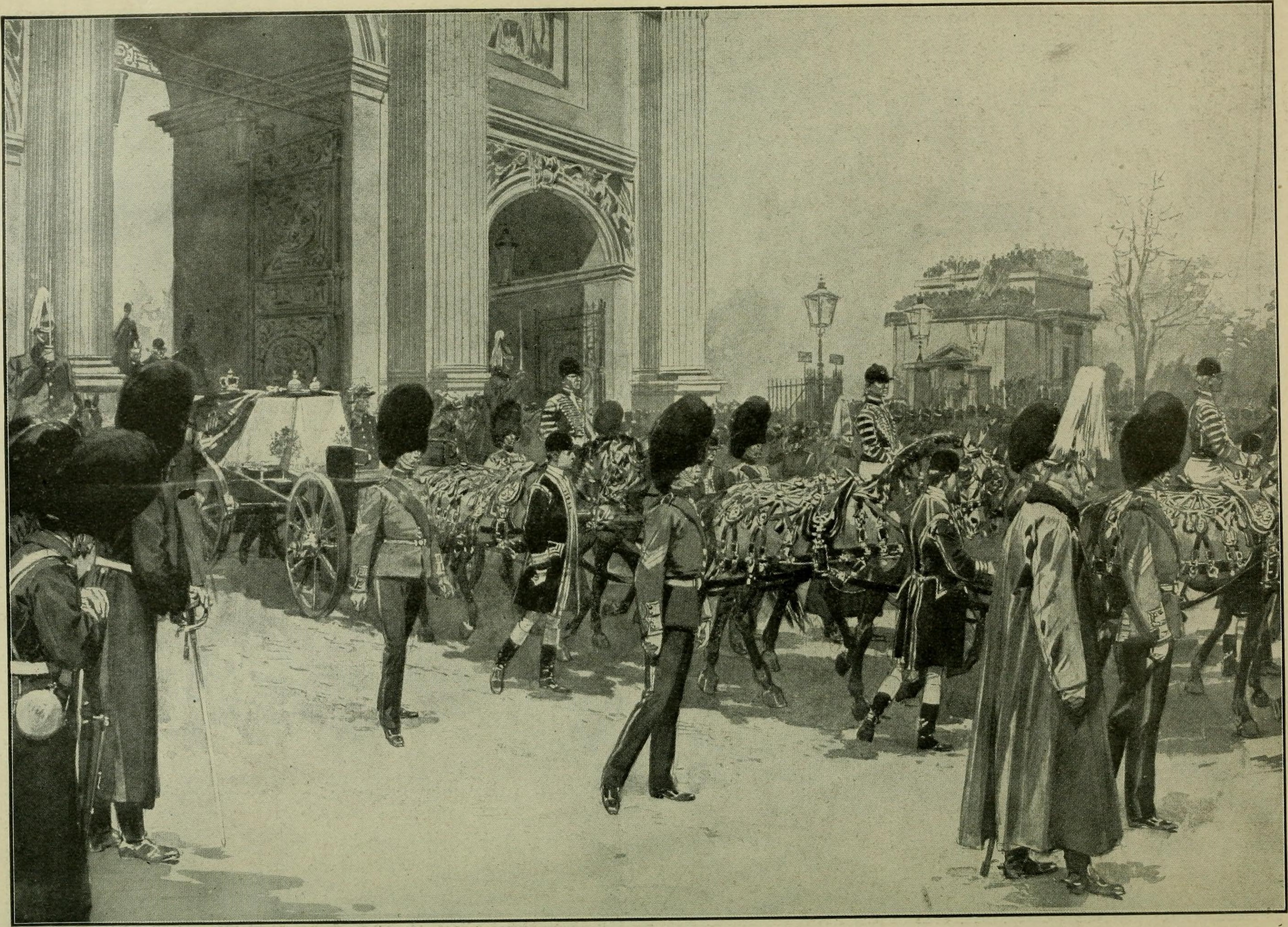
The funeral of Queen Victoria. At left, guardsmen (including an officer with sword) rest on arms reversed

Reverse arms is a marching movement in which the weapon is held reversed (pointing backwards) as a mark of respect or mourning. Rest on arms is a similar position for use when halted in which the weapon is rested pointed to the ground (as opposed to upwards as when stood at attention for example). The practice is said to have originated in Ancient Greece, though the earliest documented cases are from descriptions of 16th-century military funerals. It is known that a New Model Army soldier carried out the movement at the execution of Charles I and was later punished for rendering such an honour to the king. A unique reverse arms drill was devised as a special sign of respect for the 1722 funeral of John Churchill, 1st Duke of Marlborough at Westminster Abbey. This drill became the basis for the modern-day movements. The drill was known in former times as "club arms" (for reverse arms) and "mourn arms" (for rest on arms reversed).

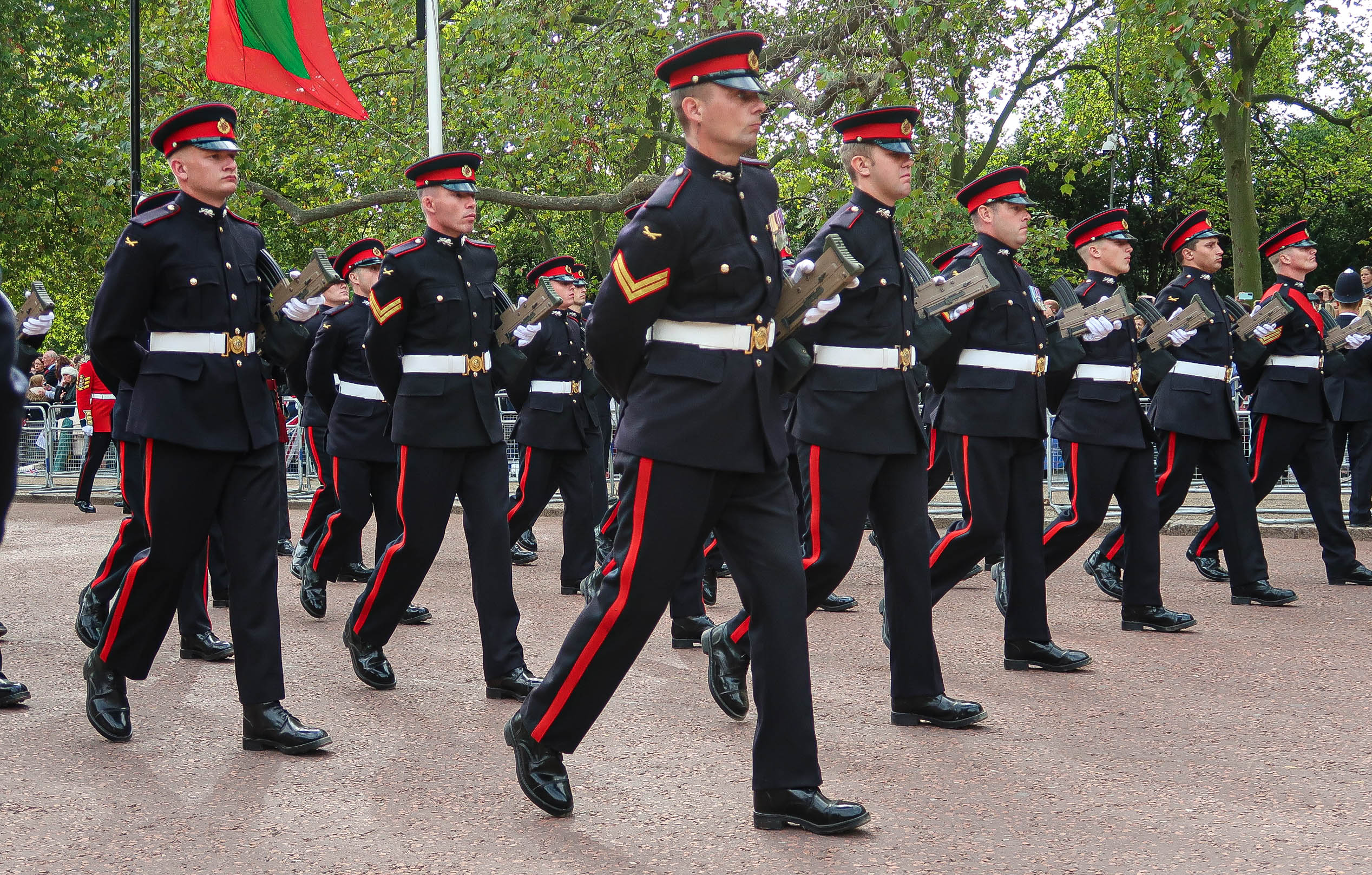
Royal Engineers march with arms reversed at the funeral of Elizabeth II

The movement was used in the US Army by the time of the American Civil War and one veteran of the time noted that the movement was tiring to perform. An 1889 article in the Journal of the United States Cavalry Association opined that "reverse arms and rest on arms are bits of fancy drill that never were of any use, and should have been eliminated from the tactics long ago". The article also stated that the movement was not used in the German military, which marched in the conventional manner at the funeral of Emperor Frederick III. The movement was dropped from US Army practice some time before the First World War. A 1886 article in the Journal of the Royal United Service Institution suggested that the movements could be dropped from British practice without affecting the solemnity of funerals. The movements do not seem to have been commonly practiced and there was some confusion at the 1901 funeral of Queen Victoria among soldiers who had not been taught the drill.

== Movements ==
=== Canada ===
Reverse arms

In the Canadian Armed Forces drill manual the movement for reverse arms is carried out before stepping off. The same movement is used for rifles, carbines and swords. The soldier is ordered to shoulder arms, the butt of the rifle is brought upwards, the muzzle is turned underneath the right arm and grasped with the left hand from behind the back. There is also a movement prescribed to switch the rifle from the right arm to the left. If parades are halted for a long period the drill manual specifies that soldiers should be ordered to return to the shoulder arms position. Arms are then to be reversed again before stepping off once more.

Rest on your arms reverse

The movement to rest on arms is carried out from the present arms position. The rifle is swung downwards so that the muzzle rests on the soldier's left foot, the right hand is placed flat on the butt of the rifle and the left hand on top of this. The soldier's head is then lowered to rest on the chin. The whole movement should take ten seconds.

=== United Kingdom ===
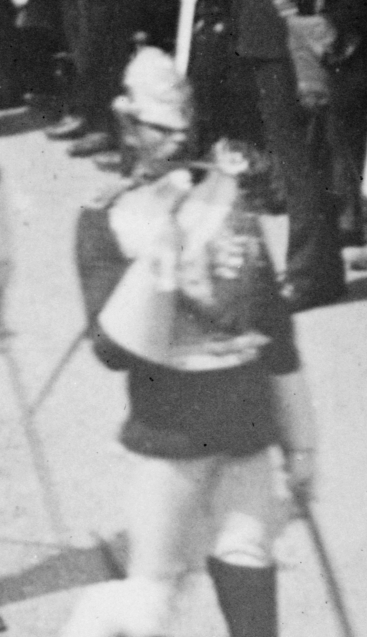
Household cavalryman marching with sword reversed at the funeral of Edward VII in 1910. Note in this instance the left hand holds the scabbard.

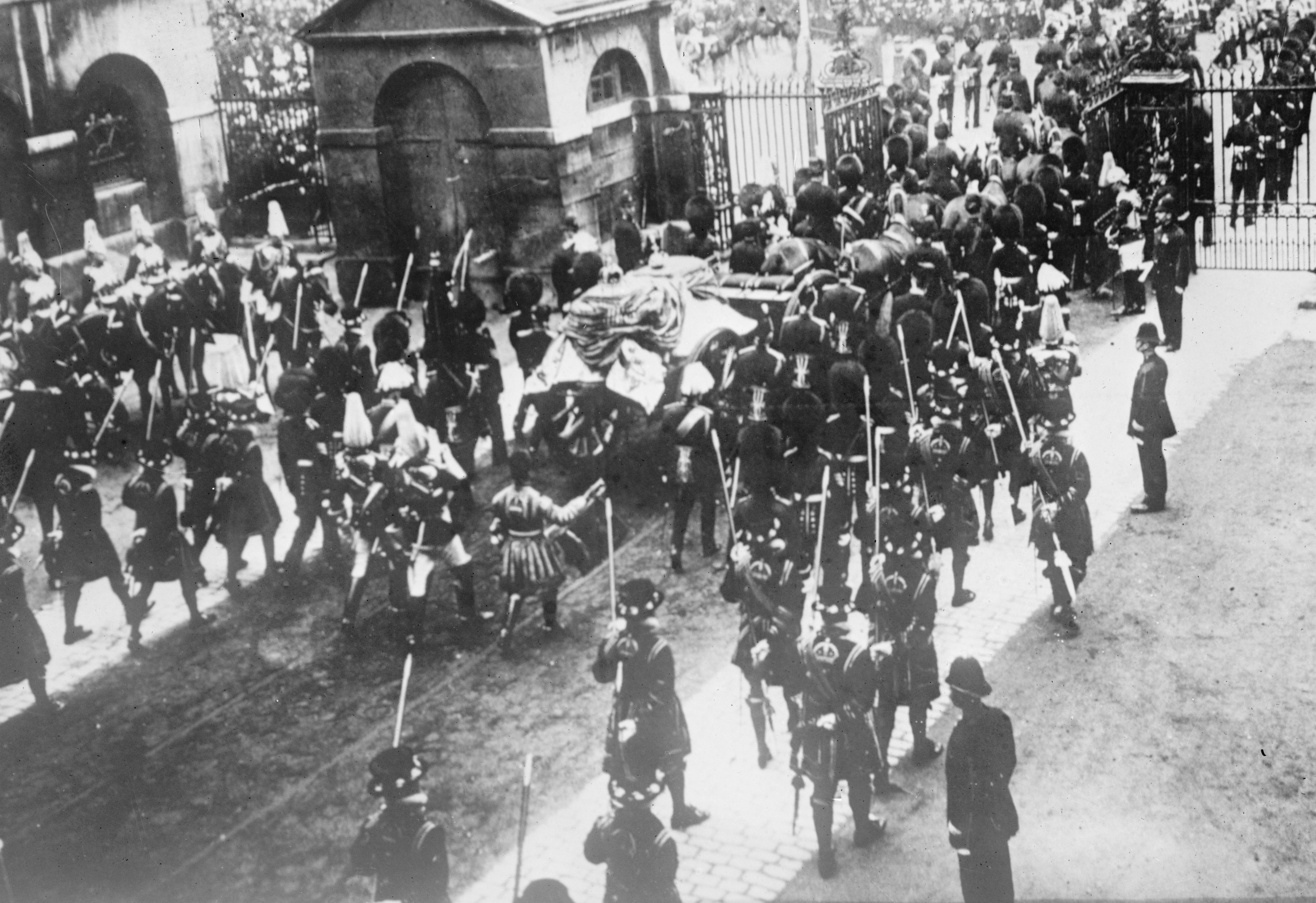
Yeomen of the Guard marching with halberds reversed at the funeral of Edward VII

Video footage of the funeral of Edward VII, showing (from approx 0:30) guardsmen marching with arms reversed.

Reverse arms

In the British Army drill manual, reverse arms is ordered from the shoulder arms position and is carried out before stepping off. The soldier's right hand reaches across to take hold of the butt of the rifle. The rifle is switched to the right side and the left hand grabs the rifle stock. The rifle is then swung downwards and turned under the right armpit to a 45-degree angle to the ground whilst the left arm reaches behind the back to grasp the barrel.

Reversed arms is always carried out at slow march initially but may transition into quick march if there is a significant distance to be covered. In quick march the left hand releases the rifle which is gripped solely by the right hand, forearm and elbow. The left arm is held as far to the rear as possible. Arms can also be changed in the reverse arms position, to provide rest to the soldier or as a spectacle for onlookers.

With swords the transition to reverse arms is made from the carry position. The sword is placed under the right armpit, with hilt and blade uppermost, and the left hand passes behind the back to grasp the blade. With swords the order is only two movements long (when compared with four movements for the rifleman) so is carried out simultaneously only with the last two movements of the rifleman's command. The sword is switched to the opposite side if change arms is ordered.

Lower on your arms reversed

In the British Army drill manual rest on arms reversed is known as "lower on your arms reversed". The rifle is brought upwards, with the left hand on the stock and the right hand taking hold of the pistol grip. The rifle is then rotated downwards to point down the right side of the body while the left hand moves from the stock to the butt. The head is then lowered to look at the ground in a movement lasting four seconds; the entire command takes ten seconds. In this position the rifle, being shorter than that used historically and being held by the pistol grip and not the butt, does not touch the ground.

The order for swords is carried out from the present arm position. The sword is brought to the recover position from which the point is swung downwards, with the edge pointing to the soldier's right. The tip is placed on the ground between the soldier's feet while the right hand rests on top of the sword pommel with the left placed over it. This takes six seconds. As with the rifle command the final four seconds are for the soldier to lower his eyes.

=== Other countries ===
The command is also used in the Irish Defence Forces, Indian Army and Nigeria Police Force. In the Australian Army, the rest on arms order reversed is still used, but the short Steyr rifle makes the reverse arms at march difficult.

== See also ==
- Battlefield cross
- Riderless horse
