= Martin H. Foery =

United States Army general

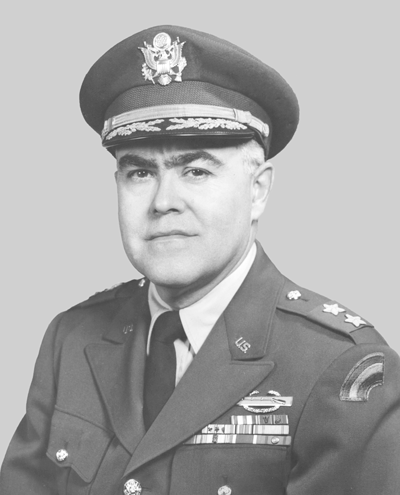
- Martin H. Foery
- Born: May 17, 1913; Brooklyn, New York, U.S.
- Died: June 4, 1994 (aged 81); Rockville Centre, New York, U.S.
- Military career
- Allegiance: United States
- Branch: United States Army
- Service years: 1931–1973
- Rank: Major General
- Commands: 42nd Infantry Division; 27th Infantry Division; 165th Infantry Regiment
- Conflicts: World War II; Battle of Makin; Battle of Saipan
- Awards: Silver Star; Legion of Merit; Bronze Star Medal

Martin H. Foery (May 17, 1913 – June 4, 1994), was a United States Army major general born in Brooklyn, New York. He was the commanding general of 42nd Infantry Division "Rainbow Division" from 1963 to 1973.

== Early years ==
Foery was born in Brooklyn, New York, in 1913. He attended St. Johns Prep School (class of 1932) where he was class president and participated in dramatics and track. He then attended St. Johns University (class of 1936) and graduated with a bachelor of science degree. While at university, he was a member of the track team and class treasurer and class president. He was also a member of the Omega Gamma Delta fraternity, Alpha Zeta chapter, as well as the Skull and Circle Honor Society of St. John's University (New York). He was married to the late Kathryn E. Foery (née Shea) and they had four children.

== Military career and background ==
Foery enlisted in the 165th Infantry (69th Infantry) Army National Guard in 1931. His first assignment was as a private with Company "A", 1st Battalion, 165th Infantry Regiment. He was promoted to corporal in 1933 and sergeant in 1934. He remained with Co. "A" until he was commissioned as a second lieutenant in 1938, when he was assigned to Company "D", 1st Battalion. In 1940, he was promoted to first lieutenant.

== World War II ==
In 1941, the 165th was inducted into federal service and was assigned to the U.S. Army 27th Infantry Division. At that time he was the executive officer of Company "D", 1st Btn.

During World War II, he served in the Pacific Theater as company commander during the Marianas Campaign. In 1942, he was promoted to captain. He was the executive officer and subsequently the commanding officer of the 165th Inf., 3rd Battalion. He was promoted to major in 1943. He was cited for gallantry during the invasions of Makin in 1943 and the Saipan in 1944. In July 1944, he was awarded the Silver Star, the United States' third highest military decoration for valor, during the Battle of Saipan (27th Infantry Div, GO 47 / 1944).

In addition, he was also awarded the Bronze Star with Oak Leaf Cluster and "V" Device.

In 1945, he was promoted to lieutenant colonel. Due to a family medical hardship he was transferred to the US and subsequently assigned to a training regiment at the Army Ground Forces Replacement Depot at Fort George Meade, Maryland.

== Post World War II ==
At the conclusion of World War II, he left federal service with the rank of lieutenant colonel. In 1947, he was assigned as the executive officer of the 165th Infantry Regiment. In 1949, he was promoted to colonel and was made the commanding officer of the regiment. With his promotion to commanding officer, he completed the military cycle from private to commander of the regiment he had joined 18 years earlier. He was also a 1952 graduate of the United States Army Command and General Staff College.

In 1957, he was promoted to a federally recognized brigadier general. He was assistant division commander of the 42nd Infantry Division from 1957 until 1963. In 1963, he was promoted to a federally recognized major general and was subsequently named commanding general by then New York State governor, Nelson A. Rockefeller. He served on the DOD Reserve Forces Policy Board from 1968 to 1971.

In March 1970, he mobilized the 42nd Infantry as part of Operation Graphic Hand to deliver U.S. Mail during the postal strike in New York.

In September 1973, he was awarded the Legion of Merit.

In July 1973, he was awarded the New York State Conspicuous Service Medal, the second highest military decoration of the New York State National Guard.

He retired from service in 1973.

== Military published history and other information ==
Foery is noted in several published military works, including 27th Infantry Division in World War II by Captain Edmund G. Love, D-Day in the Pacific: The Battle of Saipan by Harold J. Goldberg, "Battling for Saipan" by Francis A. O'Brien, The War in the Pacific: Campaign in the Marianas by Philip A. Crowl and Not a Gentleman's War: An Inside View of Junior Officers in the Vietnam War by John R. Milam. He is also mentioned in The National Guard in War: An Historical Analysis of the 27th Infantry Division (New York National Guard) in World War II by Charles S. Kaune, MAJ, USA, and Saipan: The Beginning of the End by Major Carl W. Hoffman, USMC.

He is also listed under the Honorary Colonels of the (69th) Regiment.

== Promotions ==
| Private | Corporal | Sergeant |
| E-1 | E-4 | E-5 |
| 21 Dec 1931 | 5 May 1933 | 3 July 1934 |

| Second lieutenant | First lieutenant | Captain | Major |
| O-1 | O-2 | O-3 | O-4 |
| 22 June 1938 | 29 July 1940 | 12 Feb 1942 | 15 April 1943 |

| Lieutenant colonel | Colonel | Brigadier general | Major general |
| O-5 | O-6 | O-7 | O-8 |
| 11 Jan 1945 | 21 June 1949 | 19 Nov 1957 | 1 Nov 1963 |

== Awards and decorations ==
Foery's awards and decorations include the Silver Star, Legion of Merit, Bronze Star Medal with Oak Leaf Cluster and "V" Device, American Defense, American Campaign, Asiatic Pacific Campaign (with two battle stars and Arrowhead device), World War II Victory, Combat Infantry Badge, Armed Forces Reserve (with Gold Hourglass device), New York State Conspicuous Service Medal, New York State Military Commendation, New York State Long and Faithful Service, New York State Conspicuous Service Cross, New York State Aid to Civil Authority Medal, Marksmanship Badge(W/ Rifle Bar) and Honorable Service Button.

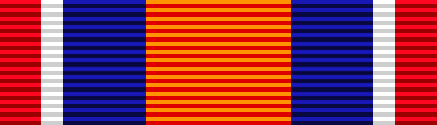

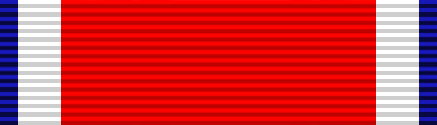

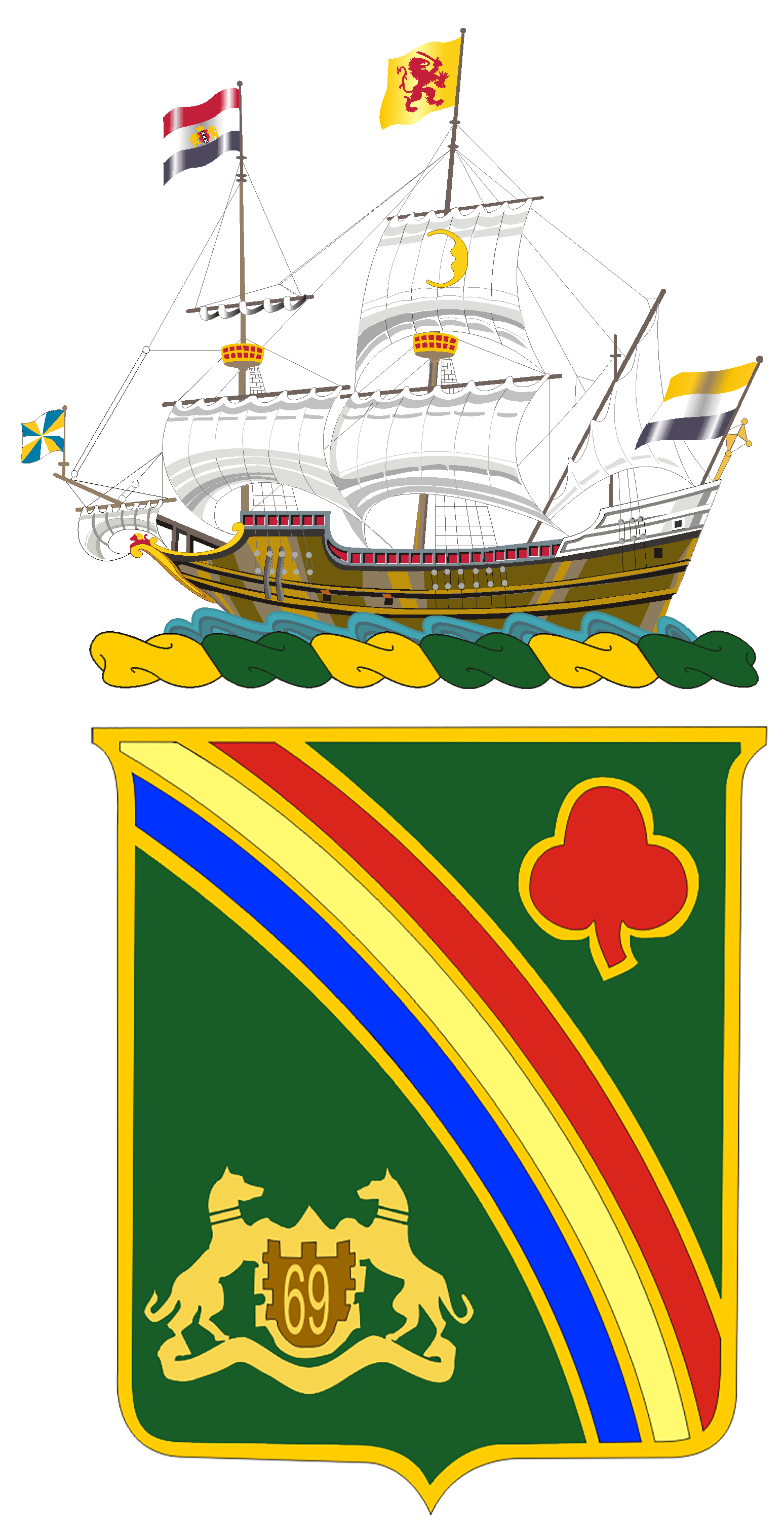

== Civilian career ==
In his civilian employment, Foery worked as a representative for Prudential Life Insurance Company. He died in June 1994.

Military offices
| Preceded by Major General Charles Coudert Nast | Commanding General - 42nd Infantry Division; 1963 – 1973 | Succeeded by Major General John C. Baker |
| Preceded by Colonel Martin H Meaney | Commanding Officer - 165th Infantry Regiment; 1949 – 1957 | Succeeded by Colonel William Lynch |
