= Brendan A. Burns =

U.S. Army major general (1895–1989)

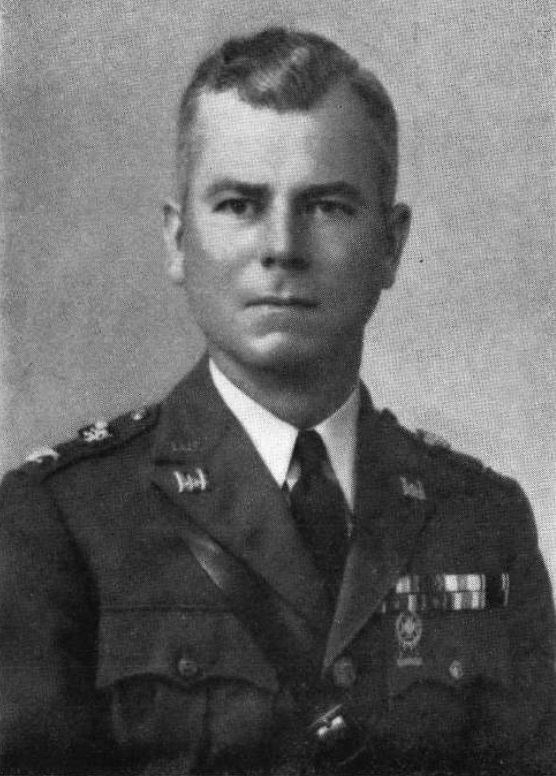
- Burns as a colonel in 1940. From the July 1940 issue of the New York National Guardsman.
- Born: February 15, 1895; Fort Lee, New Jersey, U.S.
- Died: August 27, 1989 (aged 94); Savannah, Georgia, U.S.
- Burial place: Catholic Cemetery, Savannah, Georgia, U.S.
- Spouse: Elizabeth R. Hallahan (m. 1917–1988)
- Children: 1
- Military career
- Service: United States Army
- Service years: 1917–1957
- Rank: Major General
- Service number: O188865
- Unit: New York National Guard
- Commands: Company C, 102nd Engineer Regiment; 2nd Battalion, 102nd Engineer Regiment; 102nd Engineer Regiment; 42nd Infantry Division
- Wars: World War I World War II
- Awards: Army Distinguished Service Medal; Silver Star; Legion of Merit; Bronze Star Medal; Military Cross (United Kingdom); Order of St. Stanislaus (Third Class) with Swords (Russian Republic); New York State Conspicuous Service Cross
- Other work: Homebuilder; Construction project superintendent

Brendan A. Burns (February 15, 1895 – August 27, 1989) was a career officer in the United States Army. A member of the New York National Guard, he served from 1917 to 1957 and was a veteran of World War I and World War II. He attained the rank of major general as commander of the 42nd Infantry Division, and his awards included the Army Distinguished Service Medal, Silver Star, Legion of Merit, Bronze Star Medal, Military Cross (United Kingdom), and Order of St. Stanislaus (Third Class) with Swords (Russian Republic).

A native of Fort Lee, New Jersey, Burns was raised and educated in northern New Jersey. He then began a career in the construction field and became a homebuilder and project superintendent. In 1917 he enlisted for World War I as a private in the New York National Guard's 102nd Engineer Regiment. He completed officer candidate school in 1918, and received his commission in the Engineer branch. Burns was assigned to the 310th Combat Engineer Regiment and served in Siberia with American Expeditionary Force, North Russia, part of the Allied intervention in the Russian Civil War.

After the First World War, Burns returned to the 102nd Engineers, where he advanced through the ranks and received promotion to colonel and command of the regiment in 1940. During World War II, he commanded the 102nd Engineers in the Pacific Theater as part of the 27th Infantry Division. After the war, Burns was promoted to brigadier general and served as deputy commander of the 42nd Infantry Division. He was promoted to major general in 1948 as commander of the division, and he commanded until retiring in 1957.

In retirement, Burns was a resident of Savannah, Georgia. He died in Savannah on August 27, 1989. Burns was buried at Catholic Cemetery in Savannah.

== Early life ==
Brendan Austin Burns (Note: Burns's first name appears in various sources as Brendan, Brendon, Brandon, etc. His last name appears variously as Burns, Byrne, Byrnes, etc.) was born in Fort Lee, New Jersey on February 15, 1895, a son of carpenter Thomas F. Burns and Nellie M. (Leary) Burns. He was raised and educated in several northern New Jersey towns, including Ridgefield and Edgewater, and his father served on Edgewater's town council. After graduating from Hackensack High School, Burns followed his father into the construction field and worked as a project superintendent for a New York City building and engineering company. On July 9, 1917, he married Elizabeth R. Hallahan. They were the parents of a son, Brendan A. Burns Jr.

Burns began his military career in July 1917, when he enlisted for World War I as a private in Company B, 102nd Engineer Regiment. He served with his regiment in New York, then during its wartime training at Camp Wadsworth near Spartanburg, South Carolina. In January 1918, Burns was selected to attend the officers' training camp for Engineers at Camp Lee, Virginia. He graduated in March 1918 and received his commission as a second lieutenant.

== Early career ==
After receiving his commission, Burns was assigned to the 310th Combat Engineer Regiment, which soon sailed for Arkhangelsk, Russia as part of American Expeditionary Force, North Russia, the U.S. force that took part in the Allied intervention in the Russian Civil War. Burns's regiment served with a Canadian unit that was part of the British force commanded by Edmund Ironside, 1st Baron Ironside, which served in Siberia. With rivers the main mode of transportation in northeastern Russia, detachments of the Ironside Expedition were sent to the country's interior to maintain navigation on waterways that flowed into the Arctic Ocean near Arkhangelsk. Burns distinguished himself in combat at the January 1919 Battle of Shenkursk, during which temperatures reached 50 to 70 degrees below zero Fahrenheit. His heroism in taking charge of an Infantry platoon and combining it with Engineers from his own company to fight a rearguard action resulted in award of the British Military Cross and a commendation for bravery signed by Ironside. He was also a recipient of the Silver Star and the Russian Republic's Order of St. Stanislaus (Third Class) with Swords. In addition, Burns was awarded the New York State Conspicuous Service Cross.

After the war, the Burns returned to the 102nd Engineers as a first lieutenant. He continued to work in the construction field, including homebuilding and project superintendent positions in Hamburg, New York and the Bronx before settling in Leonia, New Jersey. In June 1922, he was promoted to captain as commander of the 102nd Engineer Regiment's Company C. In 1926, he was promoted to major and assigned to command 2nd Battalion, 102nd Engineers. In 1933, he graduated from the United States Army Command and General Staff College.

== Later career ==
In August 1939, Burns was promoted to lieutenant colonel as the 102nd Engineer Regiment's executive officer. As the army expanded for World War II, in May 1940, he was promoted to colonel as commander of the regiment. In addition to serving as regimental commander, Burns also performed concurrent duty as Engineer officer on the staff of the 27th Infantry Division. During the war, Burns served in the Pacific Theater and was commended for the late 1944 development of airfields on Saipan, which enabled the United States Army Air Forces to begin bombing Tokyo and other Japanese cities. These attacks were credited helping cause the Japanese to surrender in mid-1945. For his Second World War service, Burns received the Army Distinguished Service Medal, Legion of Merit, and two awards of the Bronze Star Medal.

Following his World War II service, Burns continued his National Guard service. In June 1947, he was promoted to brigadier general and assigned as assistant division commander of the 42nd Infantry Division. In September 1948, Burns was assigned as division commander following the retirement of Cornelius W. Wickersham, and he was promoted to major general in October. Burns continued as division commander until retiring in February 1957. He was succeeded by Charles Coudert Nast.

In retirement, Burns resided in Savannah, Georgia. He died in Savannah on August 27, 1989. Burns was buried at Catholic Cemetery in Savannah.
