= Louis Jordan (American football) =

American football player (1890–1918)

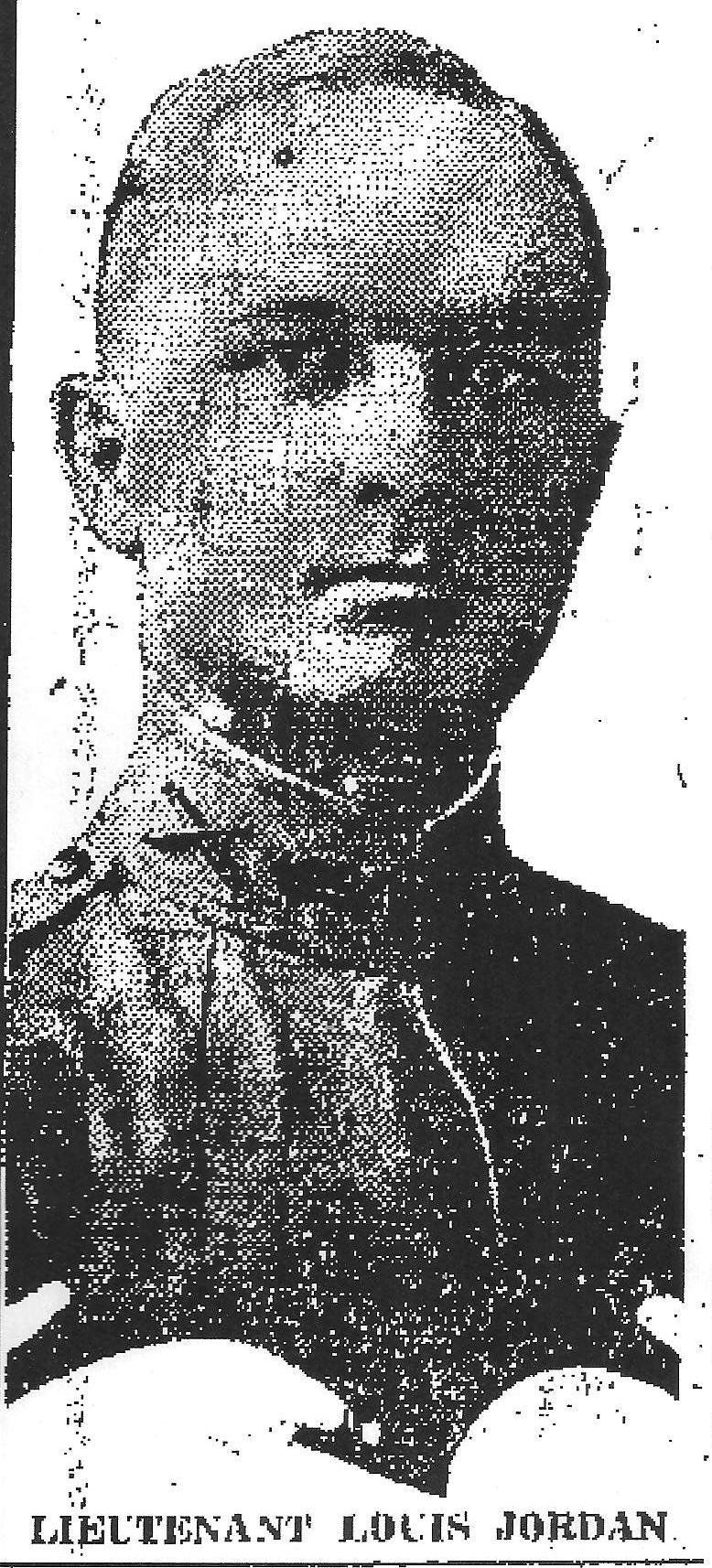

Profile
- Position: Guard

Personal information
- Born: January 30, 1890; Fredericksburg, Texas, U.S.
- Died: March 5, 1918 (aged 28); Lunéville, France

Career information
- College: Texas

Awards and highlights
- Second-team All-American (1914)

Louis John Jordan (January 30, 1890 – March 5, 1918) was an American college football player. He played for the University of Texas from 1911 to 1914 and was the first Texas Longhorns player to be selected as an All-American. Jordan was killed by a German artillery barrage while serving in France during World War I. He was among the first four individuals, and the first athlete, inducted into the Longhorn Hall of Honor. He was also selected as the honorary captain for the all-time University of Texas football team in 2009.

== Biography ==
=== Early life ===
Jordan was born and raised in Gillespie County, near Fredericksburg, Texas. He was the son of William J. Jordan and Auguste (Keller) Jordan. He received his early education in the local public schools, and worked on the family's ranch in Live Oak, Texas. He received his state teaching certificate at age 16 and taught at the Honey Creek school. After teaching school for two sessions, Jordan enrolled at the San Antonio Academy, also known as the West Texas Military Academy, in 1910. He graduated from the San Antonio Academy in 1911 and won the scholarship medal and a scholarship to the University of Texas.

=== University of Texas ===
Jordan enrolled at the University of Texas in the fall of 1911 as an engineering student. While he was a student at Texas, Jordan was a star athlete in both football and track and field. As a member of the track and field team, Jordan broke the state record for the hammer throw. However, he won his greatest acclaim as a football player. When Jordan enrolled at the University of Texas in 1911, he reportedly had to be coaxed and dragged into playing football. He "learned the rudiments of the game" while playing for Texas and played for the Texas Longhorns football team from 1911–1914. He became known as "the greatest Longhorn player of the early era of Texas football."

As a junior in 1913, Jordan led the Longhorns to a one-loss season, with the only loss coming to a Notre Dame Fighting Irish team featuring College Football Hall of Famers Knute Rockne, Gus Dorais and Ray Eichenlaub. His performance in the loss to Notre Dame became a Texas legend. According to a Texas newspaper account, Notre Dame sought to drive Jordan from the field by using four guards against him and subjecting him to the pounding of fullback Ray Eichenlaub. Prior to the Notre Dame game, Jordan had played every minute of every game on offense and defense, and he did not want to quit against Notre Dame. However, Texas coach Dave Allerdice "would not let the big fellow take any more punishment" and finally pulled him from the game.

After the 1913 season, Jordan was voted by his teammates to serve as the captain of the 1914 Texas Longhorns football team. As a senior and team captain in 1914, Jordan led the Longhorns to an undefeated and untied season with a record of 8–0. The 1914 team outscored its opponents 358–21, held opponents scoreless in five games, and allowed only a single touchdown in its three other games. After defeating a strong Haskell Indian team, 23–7, Hakell's manager praised the work of the Texas line, and the Galveston Daily News reported: "Louis Jordan proved his right to the claim that he is one of the best guards Texas has ever produced, the big blond captain of the orange fighting throughout the game like a demon."

During the 1914 Texas–Oklahoma game, Oklahoma's Hap Johnson ran the opening kickoff back 85 yards for a touchdown, but Jordan gathered his teammates around him. Teammate Clyde Littlefield later recalled that Jordan "told us in no mincing words, with a few cuss words in German and some in English, 'nobody leaves this field until we beat the hell out of them.'" Texas scored 32 unanswered points and won the game, 32–7. In Jordan's four seasons as a player for the Texas football team, the Longhorns had a record of 27–4 and outscored their opponents 875–158.

Jordan was the first University of Texas football player to be named as an All-American. He was selected as a second-team All-American by Walter Camp at the conclusion of the 1914 season. Camp was notorious for overlooking football players who did not play for the Ivy League schools of the East, and Jordan's selection, even to Camp's second team, was seen as a major concession to Jordan's talent. Damon Runyon, the New York sports writer, saw Jordan play and said, "Were that man in the East playing with Harvard or Yale he would be heralded from coast to coast as one of the greatest guards of all time."

University of Texas football historian and media relations director Bill Little later wrote of Jordan's contributions in the early years of Longhorns football:

"One of the most popular students at The University of Texas from 1911 through 1915 was a young man of German heritage from Fredericksburg, Texas, named L.J. 'Louis' Jordan. Jordan was like everybody's big brother. He was a round-faced blond who stood over 6 feet tall and weighed 205 pounds -- that was big for the time ... Jordan, in fact, was so gentle by nature he had to be coaxed to play football. But when he did, he became the greatest lineman, both offensively and defensively, of his era."

Jordan also won praise for his abilities as a student. Professor T.U. Taylor, head of the engineering department, said of Jordan, "He was one of the most brilliant men who ever graduated from this department."

Jordan was the only athlete included in the initial group of four individuals inducted into the Longhorn Hall of Honor in 1957. In September 2009, Jordan was selected as the honorary captain of the all-time University of Texas football team as chosen by the Austin American-Statesman.

=== Electrical engineer ===
Jordan graduated with honors in electrical engineering in 1915. Upon his graduation, Jordan returned to the San Antonio Academy where he taught mathematics and science. After one year in teaching, Jordan was hired as the chief engineer for the San Antonio Public Service Company, referred to in some sources as the San Antonio Traction Company.

=== Service and death in World War I ===
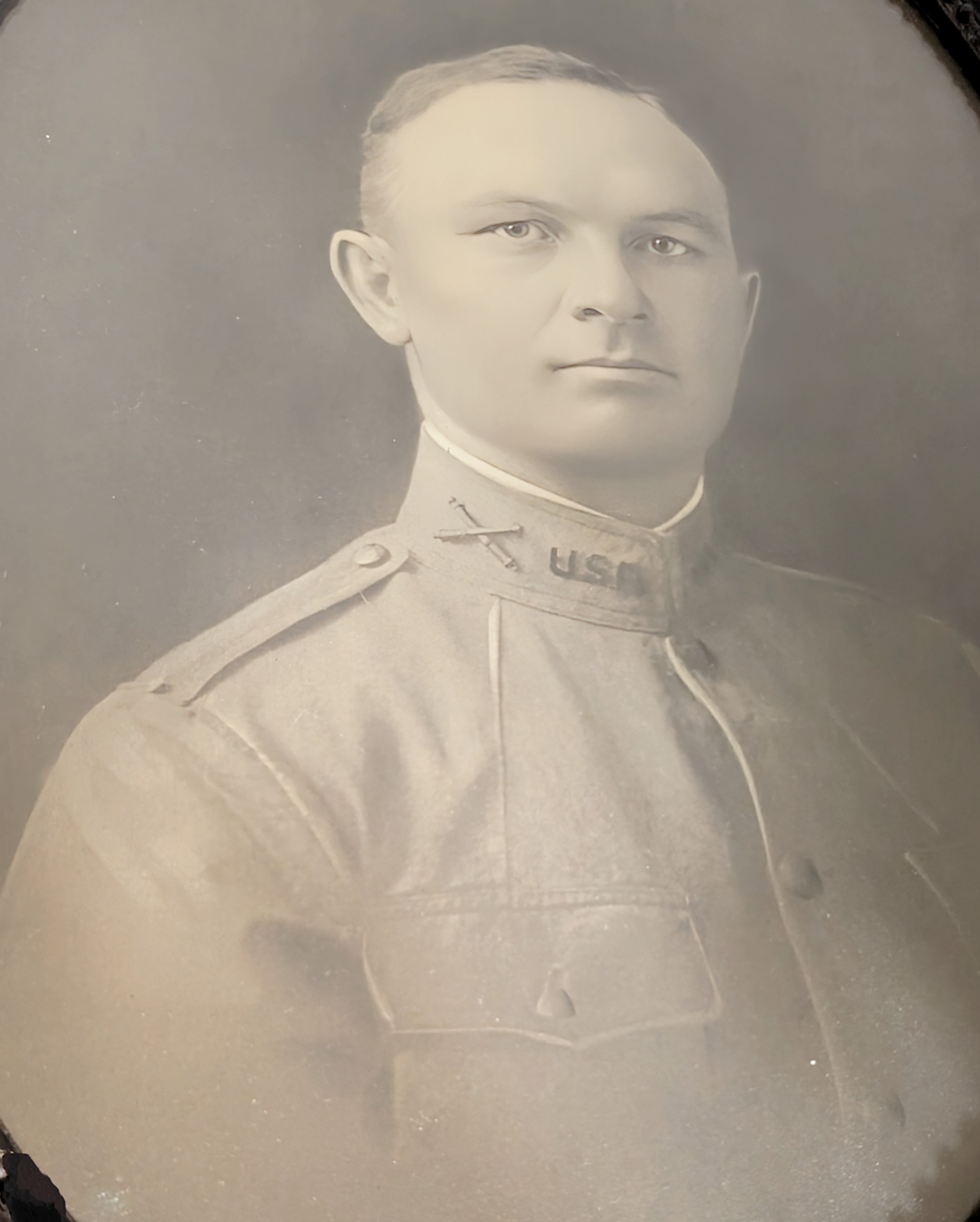
Louis Jordan army portrait

Shortly after the United States entered World War I in the Spring of 1917, Jordan left his job with the Public Service Company and enlisted in the U.S. Army. He entered the First Camp for Reserve Officers at Leon Springs, Texas, and received his officer's commission as a first lieutenant in August 1917. Jordan was selected as "one of the first quota of officers to go to France." He arrived in France in October 1917 and was assigned the 42nd Infantry Division in January 1918. Under the command of Douglas MacArthur, the 42nd Division entered the line in the Lunéville sector on the Western Front in February 1918.

Jordan kept a diary during his service in France. On March 1, 1918, five days before he was killed, Jordan wrote in his diary: "I do not want you to think for a moment that I am taking this thing entirely light-mindedly. No, not at all, but my attitude is this: Do the best you can and know how and then keep on smiling." On March 2, 1918, he made his last entry: "This fighting we are doing now is the real thing. A man gets to be quite a fatalist in this game. If somehow or other they get me -— all well and good. If not —- still better. But somehow I feel safe."

On the afternoon of March 5, 1918, Jordan was in front of a gun position when the German forces started an artillery barrage. Jordan ordered everyone into a dugout, and a German artillery shell landed at the opening of his dugout. The force of the explosion killed Jordan instantly. He was the first Texas officer and only the third United States officer to be killed in action during World War I.

Jordan's death was reported in Texas newspapers as a major story. The Galveston Daily News opened its account of the event as follows:

"Lieutenant Louis Jordan of Fredericksburg, whose death occurred in action on the American fighting line in France, March 5, was one of the most famous athletes ever produced at the University of Texas. He was the first Texas officer to give his life in the struggle to make the world safe for democracy. Louie, as he was known to his friends,

was a giant both mentally and physically. He measured six feet four inches in height and weighed 225

pounds just before his last football game ... He counted his friends by the hundreds and his admirers were all who met him.

Jordan was posthumously awarded the Croix de Guerre, and resolutions in his honor were passed by the Texas legislature.

=== Funeral ===
Jordan was initially buried at a military cemetery in Bénaménil, France, but his body was returned to Texas in 1921 for burial in Der Stadt Friedhof at his hometown of Fredericksburg. Before the reburial, Jordan's remains lay in state at the county courthouse, "the coffin draped with an American flag and under a profusion of flowers." Hundreds of Texans filed past the casket "paying silent respects" to Jordan. As his flag-draped casket was taken to the cemetery, a uniformed honor guard accompanied the casket, as an "immense concourse of citizens followed." Professor T. U. Taylor of the University of Texas spoke at the funeral, and the services were closed with the firing of guns over the grave and the playing of taps by a bugler from Camp Travis.

=== The Louis Jordan Flagpole ===
In 1919, the American Legion post in Fredericksburg was renamed the Louis Jordan Post in his honor. In 1924, the residents of Fredericksburg raised a fund to erect a monument to Jordan in the new Texas Memorial Stadium. The monument consisted of a 100-foot high flagpole with a bronze tablet inscribed, "In memory of First Lieut. Louis J. Jordan, University of Texas, 1911–15, who died in the service of his country in the great World war, 1914–1918. Erected by the citizens of Fredericksburg. Dedicated November 27, 1924, A.D." The Jordan memorial was unveiled on Thanksgiving Day 1924 before the Texas-Texas A&M game and was the first monument to be placed in Memorial Stadium.

The flagpole remained in place at the south end of the stadium until it was removed in 1972 for the installation of a new scoreboard. In November 2000, at a dedication ceremony before the Texas-Texas A&M football game, a replica of the flagpole memorial was installed in the southeast corner of the stadium. At the dedication, the honor guard wore World War I uniforms and a lone trumpeter from the marching band played taps in memory of Jordan's service. The memorial continues to be known as the Louis Jordan Flagpole. An exhibit featuring Jordan's 1914 letter sweater, part of his World War I uniform and his shrapnel-pierced diary is on display in a hall beneath the stadium's grandstand.
