= Wedtech scandal =

1980s American political scandal

The Wedtech scandal was an American political scandal involving the award of government contracts. It was first brought to light in 1986.

== History ==
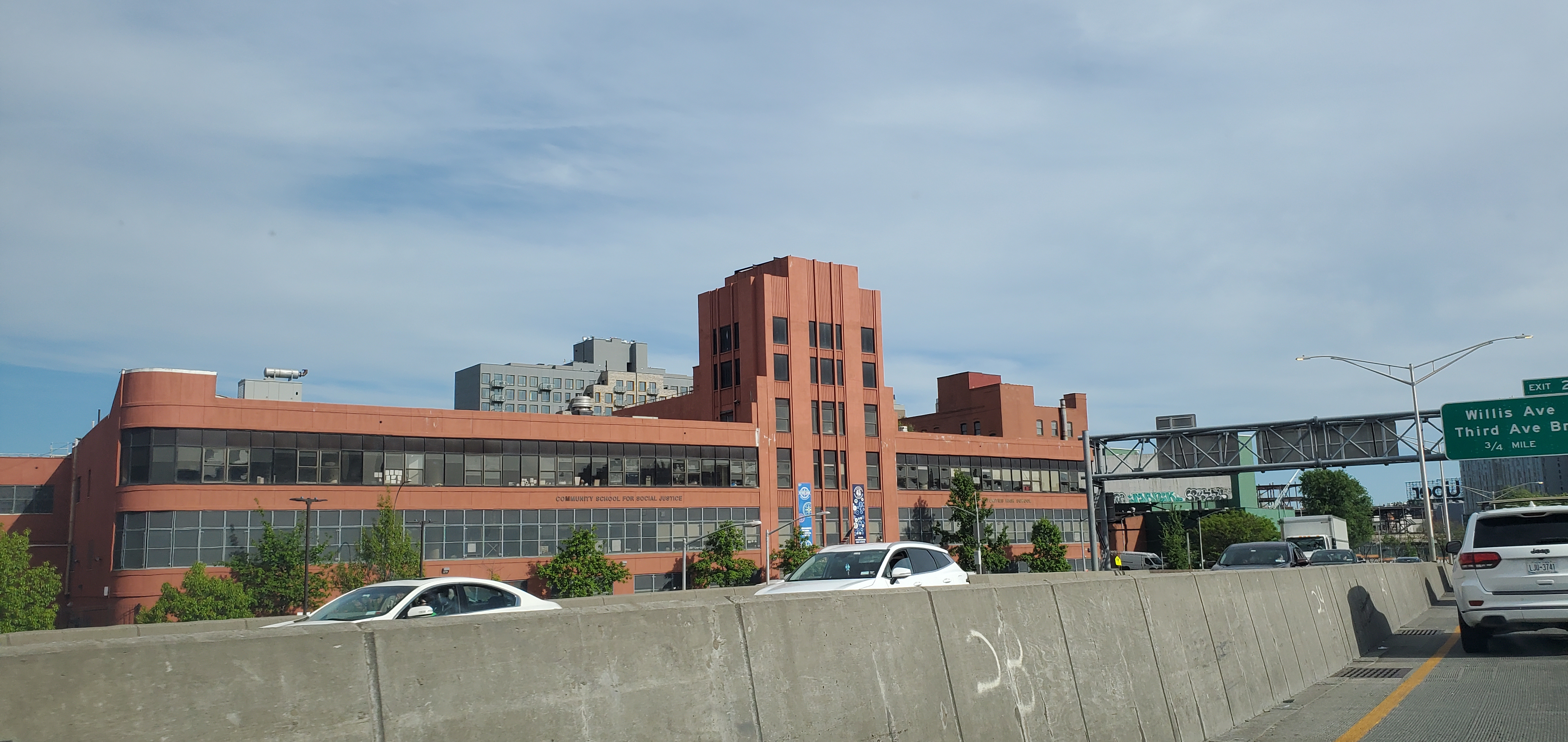
The former Wedtech facility in Mott Haven, Bronx, is now used by public high schools.

The Wedtech Corporation was founded in the Bronx, New York by John Mariotta, who had owned and operated the Welbilt Electronic Die Corporation, which manufactured parts for baby carriages. After reorganizing the company as Wedtech in 1980, Mariotta brought in a partner, Fred Neuberger, and began focusing on winning small business set-aside contracts from the Department of Defense.

As a major employer in a depressed part of New York City, Wedtech enjoyed a strong local reputation and was even praised by then U.S. President Ronald Reagan for the jobs it provided for those who might otherwise be forced onto welfare rolls. Mariotta was praised as the Small Business Owner of the Year by the U.S. Small Business Administration.

Wedtech had won many of its defense contracts without competitive bidding under a Small Business Administration program that gave preference to minority-owned businesses, despite the fact that Fred Neuberger, not a member of any government recognized minority, owned a majority of the company's stock, thus disqualifying Wedtech as a minority-owned business. To keep Neuberger's controlling ownership secret, the company committed fraud, forging papers that claimed Mariotta was still the primary owner of the company.

When Wedtech went public, it gave shares of stock to law firms (as payment for legal services), including Squadron, Ellenoff, Plesent & Sheinfeld. Some of the law firms employed members or relatives of members of the U.S. House of Representatives, including Bronx Congressmen Mario Biaggi and Robert Garcia. Both would later resign their seats due to their roles in the scandal and were subsequently jailed, as were State Senators Clarence Mitchell III and Michael Bowen Mitchell of Maryland. With undisclosed holdings in Wedtech, they used their positions to help Wedtech win federal work.

Another key figure in the scandal was Paul Castellano's first cousin, Maj. General Vito J. Castellano who occupied key capitol positions in Albany, such as the former commander of the New York National Guard during Governor Mario Cuomo's administration.

Vito Castellano pled guilty to state charges of tax evasion in connection with payments from the Wedtech Corporation. Indicted on charges of bribing Mr. Castellano was Bernard G. Ehrlich, whom Castellano had promoted to commanding officer of the 42nd Infantry Division of the National Guard.

Wedtech then began extending its reach to the White House, utilizing President Reagan's press secretary, Lyn Nofziger, to contact public liaison officer (and future Senator) Elizabeth Dole. Through Dole, Wedtech won a $32 million contract to produce small engines for the United States Army. This was only the first of many no-bid deals that eventually totaled $250 million.

In 1985, Edwin Meese invested in stock with a Wedtech consultant.

In 1987, a Manhattan Court issued indictments for Mario Biaggi, Stanley Simon, and Peter P. Neglia.

By the final years of Reagan's second term, Wedtech's crimes had become too numerous to hide. An independent counsel was appointed by Congress, which later charged Attorney General Edwin Meese with complicity in the scandal (his close friend had worked as a lobbyist for the company and sought help from Meese on Wedtech contract matters). While Meese was never convicted of any wrongdoing, he resigned in 1988 when the independent counsel delivered the report on Wedtech.

Independent counsel James McKay never prosecuted or sought indictment of Meese, but in his official report, which is still confidential, he was highly critical of Meese's ethics and urged further investigation of Meese's role in that scandal and others (such as Meese's efforts to help Bechtel Corporation build an oil pipeline for Saddam Hussein's Iraq).

In all, more than 20 state, local, and federal government officials were convicted of crimes in connection to the scandal. Some of these convictions, however, were reversed on appeal in 1991 when it was found that Anthony Guariglia, former Wedtech president and a star government witness, had committed perjury, and that the prosecutors had reason to know he was committing perjury. Guariglia had been convicted of lying about stopping his compulsive gambling, and an appeals court found that the jury would have likely discredited his testimony if it had known about the perjury.

== Notes ==
- Haslip-Viera, Gabriel; Felix V. Matos Rodriguez; Angelo Falcon (2005). Boricuas in Gotham: Puerto Ricans in the Making of New York City. Markus Wiener. ISBN 1-55876-356-2.
- Roth, Mitchel P. (2001). Historical Dictionary of Law Enforcement. Greenwood Press. ISBN 0-313-30560-9.
