= John C. Baker =

US Army major general

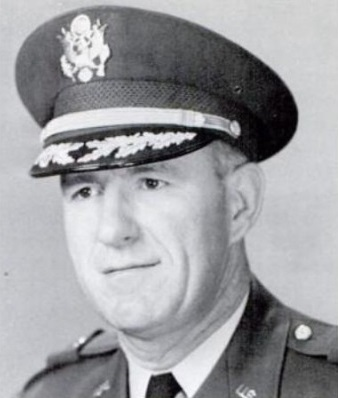
- Baker as a brigadier general in 1966
- Born: April 15, 1919; Troy, New York, US
- Died: January 20, 1996 (aged 76); Clifton Park, New York, US
- Burial place: Oakwood Cemetery, Troy, New York, US
- Education: Rensselaer Polytechnic Institute (attended); United States Army Command and General Staff College
- Spouse: Marjorie Sarah Allison (m. 1941–1996)
- Children: 5
- Military career
- Service: Army National Guard (1935–1940, 1947–1975); United States Army (1940–1946); United States Army Reserve (1946–1947)
- Service years: 1935–1975
- Rank: Major General
- Service number: 0368365
- Unit: New York Army National Guard
- Commands: Headquarters and Headquarters Company, 105th Infantry Regiment; 1st Battalion, 105th Infantry Regiment; 105th Infantry Regiment; Combat Command A, 27th Armored Division; 27th Armored Division Artillery; Emergency Operations Headquarters, New York National Guard; 42nd Infantry Division; New York National Guard
- Wars: World War II
- Awards: Army Distinguished Service Medal; Silver Star; Bronze Star Medal; Combat Infantryman Badge
- Other work: Deputy Director, Rennselaer County Office of Disaster Preparedness

John C. Baker (April 15, 1919 – January 20, 1996) was a career officer in the United States Army. A veteran of World War II and a longtime member of the New York Army National Guard, he advanced from private to major general. Baker served as commander of the 42nd Infantry Division and Adjutant General of New York. His awards included the Silver Star, two awards of the Purple Heart, and the Combat Infantryman Badge.

A native of Troy, New York, Baker was raised and educated in Troy, the state of Georgia, and the state of Florida, and was a graduate of Troy's Lansingburgh High School. He joined the National Guard in 1935, when he was 15, and he received his commission as a second lieutenant in 1938. He was mobilized for federal service for World War II, and served in the Pacific theater with the 105th Infantry Regiment. Baker also pursued a civilian career with the federal government, and was a longtime district director for the General Services Administration.

After his wartime service, Baker rejoined the National Guard, and he advanced through command and staff positions, including command of: 105th Infantry Regiment; Combat Command A, 27th Armored Division; 27th Armored Division Artillery; and the New York National Guard's Emergency Operations Headquarters. In 1971, he was appointed Adjutant General of New York, and in 1973 he was assigned to command the 42nd Infantry Division. He served in both these roles until retiring from the military in 1975.

After retiring from the National Guard, Baker worked as deputy director of the Rennselaer County Office of Disaster Preparedness. In retirement, he resided in Clifton Park, New York. He died in Clifton Park on January 20, 1996. Baker was buried at Oakwood Cemetery in Troy.

== Early life ==
John Caswell Baker was born in Troy, New York on April 15, 1919. (Note: Baker was born John Caswell Landers. His birth record names his parents as Helen Caswell and Matthew B. Landers, who married in 1916. By the time of the 1930 Census, Helen Caswell was married to Frank G. Baker.) His father was Frank G. Baker and his mother was Helen (Caswell) Baker. (Note: Several editions of the Official U.S. Army Register give Baker's birth year as 1916, but most other sources including the 1930 U.S. Census indicate that 1919 is correct. Baker may have provided an incorrect birthdate so he would appear old enough to enlist in the National Guard when he joined in March 1935. At the time of his enlistment, the minimum age was 18, so his actual age of 15 would have made him too young.) He was raised and educated in Troy, as well as southern locales including Augusta, Georgia and Florida, and was a graduate of Lansingburgh High School. After high school, Baker studied industrial engineering at Rensselaer Polytechnic Institute.

Baker began his military career in March 1935, when he enlisted as a private in the New York National Guard's Headquarters Company, 105th Infantry Regiment. He advanced to corporal, and received his commission as a second lieutenant in March 1938.

== Start of career ==
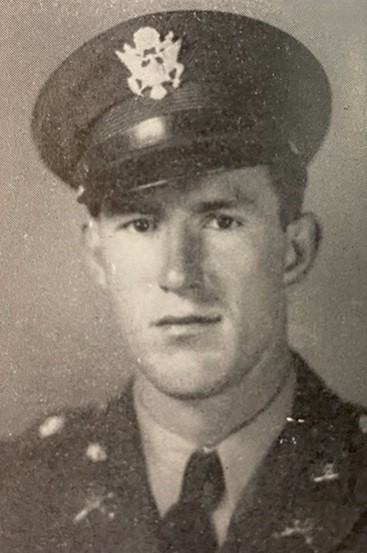
Baker as a first lieutenant in 1941

In September 1940, Baker entered federal service for World War II, accepting reduction in rank to staff sergeant. In October, Baker was recommissioned as a second lieutenant. While his unit underwent reorganization and training, he completed the Infantry Officer Communications Course and the Chemical Warfare Course. The 105th Infantry Regiment served in the Pacific as part of the 27th Infantry Division, and Baker was assigned to command the regimental Headquarters Company. He took part in numerous battles, and was wounded twice, for which he received the Purple Heart with oak leaf cluster. He received the Silver Star for heroism during the Battle of Saipan, during which he organized rear echelon personnel into a fighting force which he led in a successful counterattack that prevented attacking Japanese from overrunning his position.

After the war, Baker served briefly in the United States Army Reserve before transferring his military membership back to the New York National Guard. He also pursued a civilian career, which included positions as a foreman with the Tek-Hughes division of the Autograf Brush Company in Watervliet and Albany district director for the federal General Services Administration.

== Continued career ==
After returning to the National Guard in March 1947, Baker was assigned to command 1st Battalion, 105th Infantry Regiment. In 1951, he completed the Infantry Officer Advanced Course and the Air-Ground Operations Course. In 1953, he graduated from the Infantry Field Grade Officer Refresher Course and was appointed to command the 105th Infantry. In 1954, Baker graduated from the Armor Field Grade Officer Refresher Course and the associate course at the United States Army Command and General Staff College. In 1955 he was assigned to command Combat Command A, 27th Armored Division and graduated from the Special Weapons Course at the Artillery and Guided Missile School. He graduated from the Armor Officer Advanced Course in 1957, and the Army National Guard Division Staff Officer Course in 1958. In 1958, Baker also graduated from the Senior Officer Preventive Maintenance Course and the Senior Officer Nuclear Weapons Employment Course.

In 1959, Baker graduated from the Tactical Use of Nuclear Weapons Course and the Field Artillery Field Grade Officers Refresher Course. In October 1959, he was promoted to brigadier general and assigned as the New York Army National Guard's chief of staff. In July 1960, he was assigned to command the 27th Armored Division Artillery. Also in 1960, Baker completed the Senior Artillery Officer Surface to Air Missile Course and the Senior Field Artillery Officers Course. In 1961, he graduated from the Reserve course at the Command and General Staff College and completed the Logistical Command Course. In 1961 and 1962, Baker completed the refresher course for Division Artillery staff officers. In 1962, he graduated from the Reserve Component General Officer Orientation Course. In 1962 and 1963, he attended the Combat Division Officers Course. In 1963, he completed the Senior Air Defense Artillery Officers Course. He graduated from the Army Management Orientation Course in 1964.

== Later career ==
In 1961, Baker was assigned as assistant division commander of the 27th Armored Division. In February 1963, he was assistant adjutant general of the New York National Guard and deputy commander of the New York Army National Guard. In July 1968, he was appointed commander of the New York National Guard's Emergency Operations Headquarters and promoted to major general.

In January 1971, Baker was appointed Adjutant General of New York, succeeding Almerin C. O'Hara. (Note: At the time, the title was chief of staff to the governor.) In 1973, he assumed command of the 42nd Infantry Division, an assignment he carried out while continuing to serve as adjutant general. Baker retired from the military in December 1975 and was succeeded by Vito J. Castellano.

== Retirement and death ==
After retiring from the military, Baker was employed as deputy director of the Rennselaer County Office of Disaster Preparedness. Baker's civic and professional memberships included the American Legion and Society of American Military Engineers. In addition, he was a trustee of Hudson Valley Community College.

Baker later resided in Clifton Park, New York. In his final years, he was a resident at a Clifton Park nursing home. He died in Clifton Park on January 20, 1996. Baker was buried at Oakwood Cemetery in Troy.

== Awards ==
At his retirement, Baker received the Army Distinguished Service Medal. In addition to the Silver Star and two Purple Hearts, his additional federal awards included:

- Bronze Star Medal
- American Defense Service Medal
- American Campaign Medal
- Asiatic–Pacific Campaign Medal with arrowhead
- Combat Infantryman Badge

Baker's state awards included:

- New York Conspicuous Service Cross (five awards)
- New York Long and faithful Service Medal (30 years)

=== Silver Star citation ===
"During the 1944 Battle of Saipan, in the face of enemy fire, he organized the clerks, communications men and other specialists of the regimental Headquarters Company into a fighting force and personally led a counterattack that halted the desperate charge of the Japanese."

Organization: Headquarters, 27th Infantry Division Orders: General Orders No. 60 (1944)

== Effective dates of promotion ==
- Private to Staff Sergeant, March 21, 1935 to June 1, 1938
- Second Lieutenant (National Guard), June 2, 1938
- Staff Sergeant (Army), September 26, 1940
- Second Lieutenant (Army), October 14, 1940
- First Lieutenant (Army), May 21, 1941
- Captain (Army), April 30, 1943
- Captain (Reserve), September 9, 1945
- Major (Reserve), March 15, 1947
- Lieutenant Colonel (National Guard), May 3, 1948
- Colonel (National Guard), February 9, 1953
- Brigadier General (Adjutant General's Corps) (National Guard), November 10, 1959
- Brigadier General (Line) (National Guard), November 16, 1960
- Major General (Line) (National Guard), July 5, 1968
- Major General (Retired), December 24, 1975
