= 42nd Infantry Division (United States) =

US Army National Guard formation

- 42d ID Shoulder Sleeve Insignia
- Active: 14 August 1917–9 May 1919; 5 February 1943–29 June 1946; 31 March 1947–present
- Country: United States
- Branch: United States Army
- Type: Infantry
- Size: Division
- Part of: United States Army National Guard
- Garrison/HQ: Glenmore Road Armory, Troy, NY
- Nickname: "Rainbow" (special designation)
- Motto: Never Forget!
- Engagements: World War I; Champagne-Marne; Aisne-Marne; St. Mihiel; Meuse-Argonne; Champagne 1918; Lorraine 1918; World War II; Rhineland; Ardennes-Alsace; Central Europe; War on terror; Afghanistan; Iraq; Operation Enduring Freedom; 2026 Iran war

Commanders
- Current commander: MG Jack James
- Notable commanders: Major General W. A. Mann; Major General Charles T. Menoher; Major General Charles D. Rhodes; Brigadier General Douglas MacArthur; Major General C. A. F. Flagler; Major General George W. Read; Major General Harry J. Collins; Major General Martin H. Foery; Major General Joseph J. Taluto

Insignia
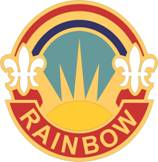
- Distinctive unit insignia

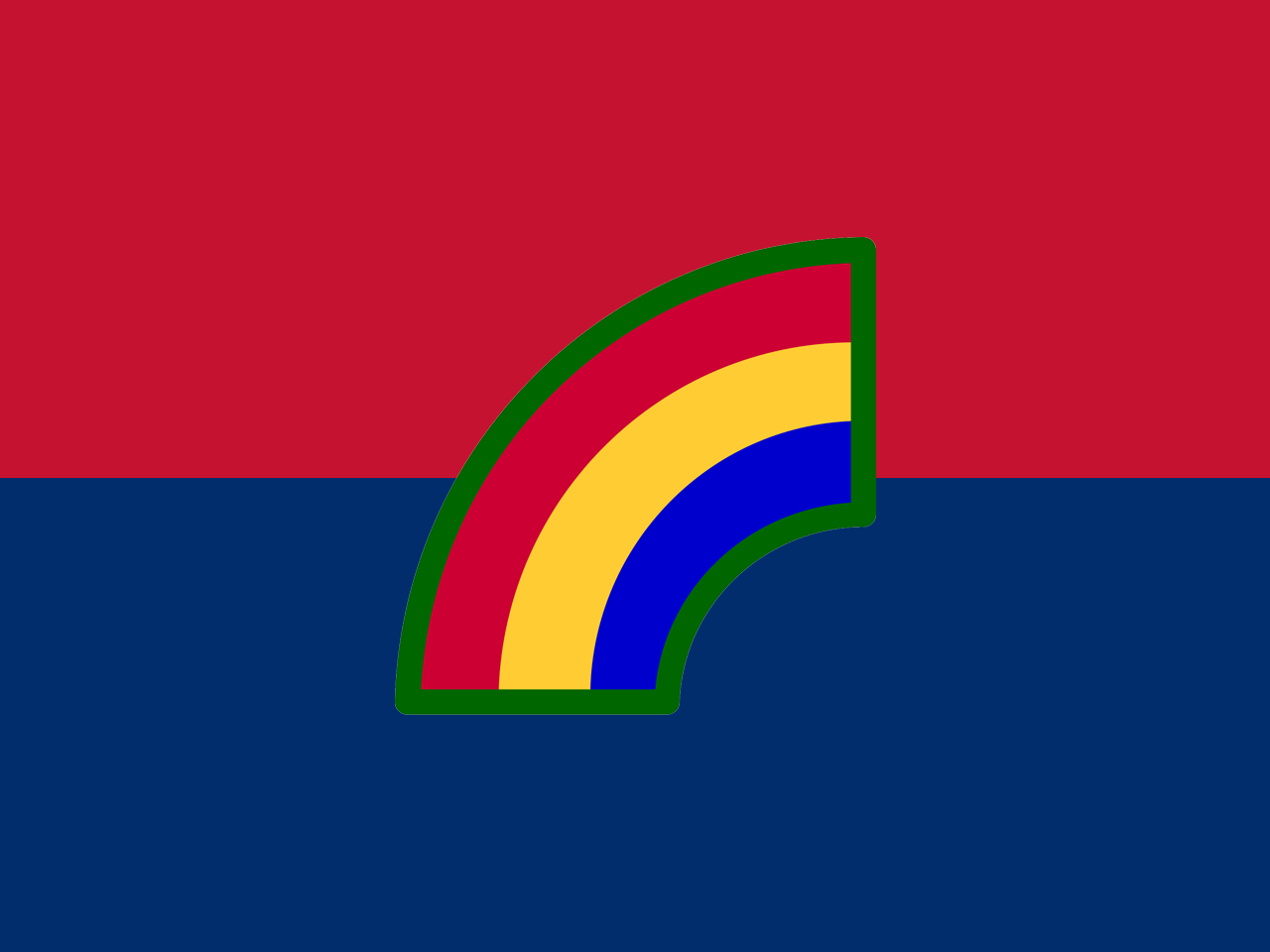
- Flag of the United States Army 42nd Infantry Division

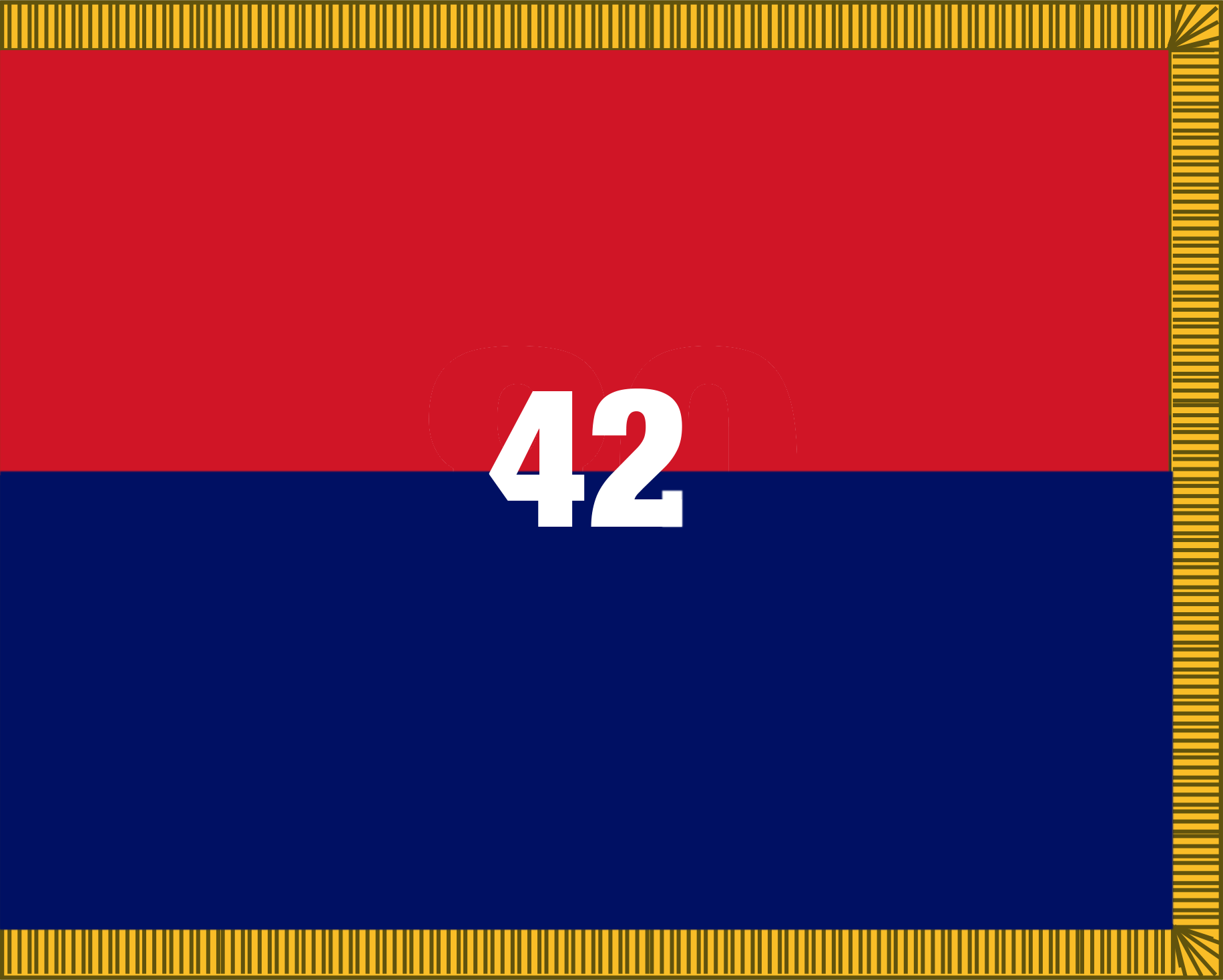
- 42nd Infantry Division WWII flag

The 42nd Infantry Division (42ID) ("Rainbow") is a division of the United States Army National Guard. It was nicknamed the Rainbow Division because, during rapid mobilization for service the First World War, it was formed from 27 National Guard units from across the US. The division was engaged in four major operations between July 1918 and the armistice in November 1918, and demobilized in 1919. The division then served during World War II in Europe. After the September 11 terrorist attacks of 2001, it carried out multiple homeland security activities; deployments to the War in Afghanistan (2001-2021); as well as to the Iraq War (U.S. phase, 2003-2010).

The division is currently headquartered at the Glenmore Road Armory in Troy, New York. The division headquarters is a unit of the New York Army National Guard. The division currently includes Army National Guard units from fourteen different states, including Connecticut, Maine, Maryland, Massachusetts, Michigan, New Hampshire, New Jersey, New York, Rhode Island, and Vermont. As of 2007, 67 percent of 42ID soldiers are located in New York and New Jersey.

== History ==
=== World War I ===
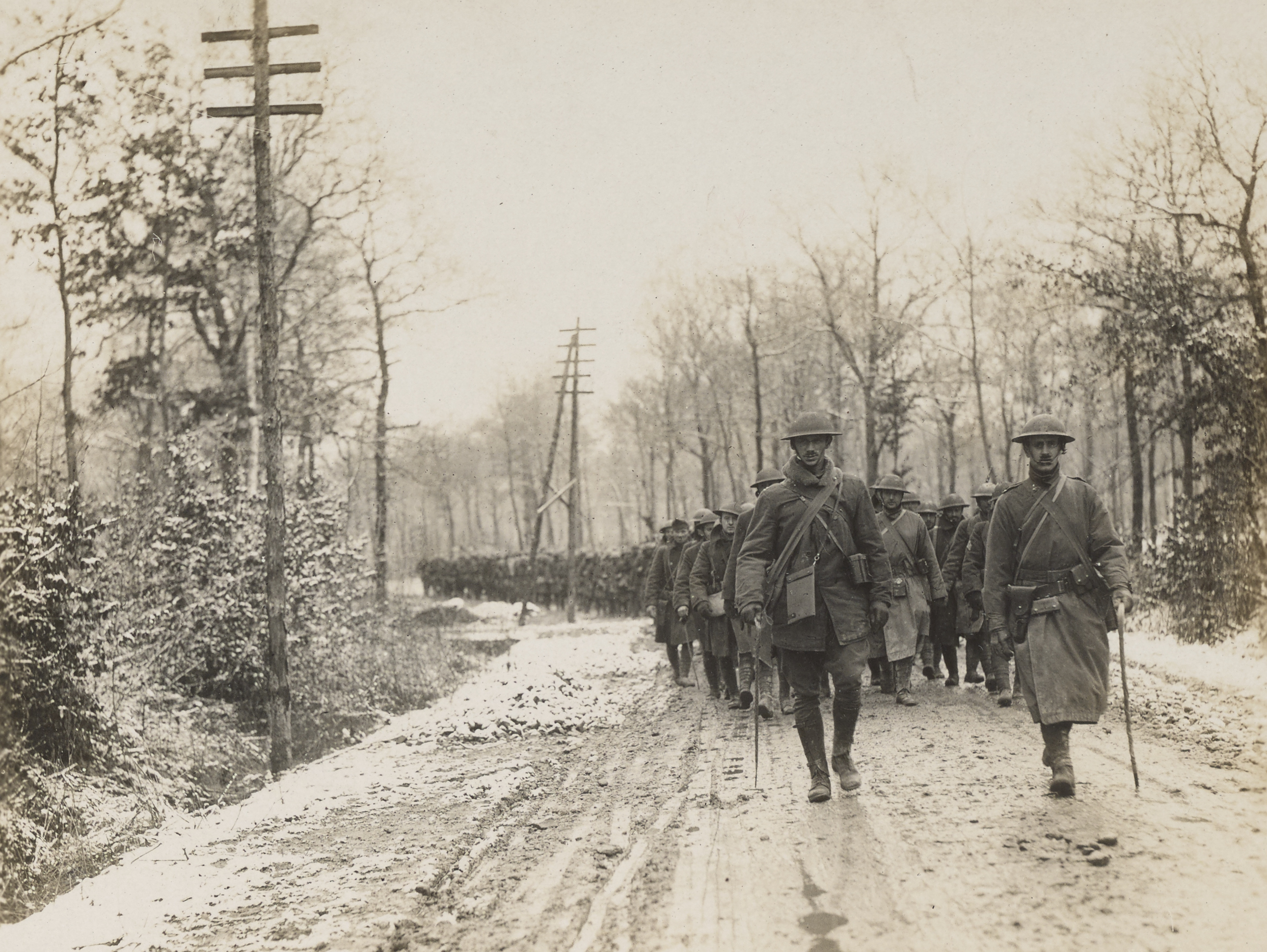
Men of Company D, 165th Infantry Regiment, 42nd Division, on hike from Bénaménil, France, to a rest camp at Chenevières, March 1, 1918.

==== Rainbow Division ====
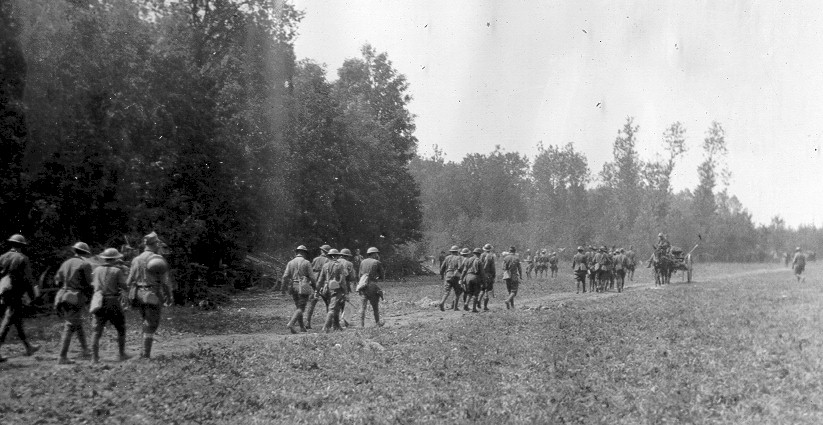
A burial party of the 42nd Division, these parties were kept busy for days digging graves for the dead that littered the fields and woods after the advance beyond Chateau-Thierry. Beuvardes, France, July 30, 1918.

When the United States entered World War I by declaring war on Germany in April 1917, it federalized the National Guard and organized many of its units into divisions to quickly build up the Army. Douglas MacArthur, then a major, suggested to Major General William Abram Mann, the head of the Militia Bureau, that he form a division from the units of several states that had not been assigned to divisions. Secretary of War Newton D. Baker approved the proposal, and recalled MacArthur saying that such an organization would "stretch over the whole country like a rainbow."

On 1 August 1917, the War Department directed the formation of a composite National Guard division, comprising units from 26 states and the District of Columbia. As a result, the 42nd Division came to be known as the "Rainbow Division". The name stuck, and MacArthur was promoted to colonel and became the division's chief of staff, with Mann as its commander.

The 42nd Division was assembled in August 1917 at Camp Mills, New York, four months after the American entry into World War I. The 42nd arrived at the Western Front of Belgium and France in November 1917, one of the first divisions of the American Expeditionary Forces (AEF) to do so, under the command of Mann, although he was soon to be replaced by Major General Charles T. Menoher, who remained in this position for the rest of the war. Colonel Douglas MacArthur was the division's chief of staff until assigned command of its 84th Brigade.

After initially landing at St. Nazaire, France, the 42nd was temporarily located at Vaucouleurs, Lorraine, from 7 November – 7 December 1917, to preliminarily train before transferring to another training area between Lafauche and Rimaucourt. The day after Christmas, the 42nd, along with other divisions it had now linked up with, departed for another training area near Rolampont, Langres. French officers had been attached to the 42nd at Lafauche, Rimaucourt, and Rolampont as instructors in trench warfare who "...seemed, from Menoher and MacArthur's view, to think more highly of the Rainbow's performance than did AEF commander General John Pershing and his Chaumont staff".

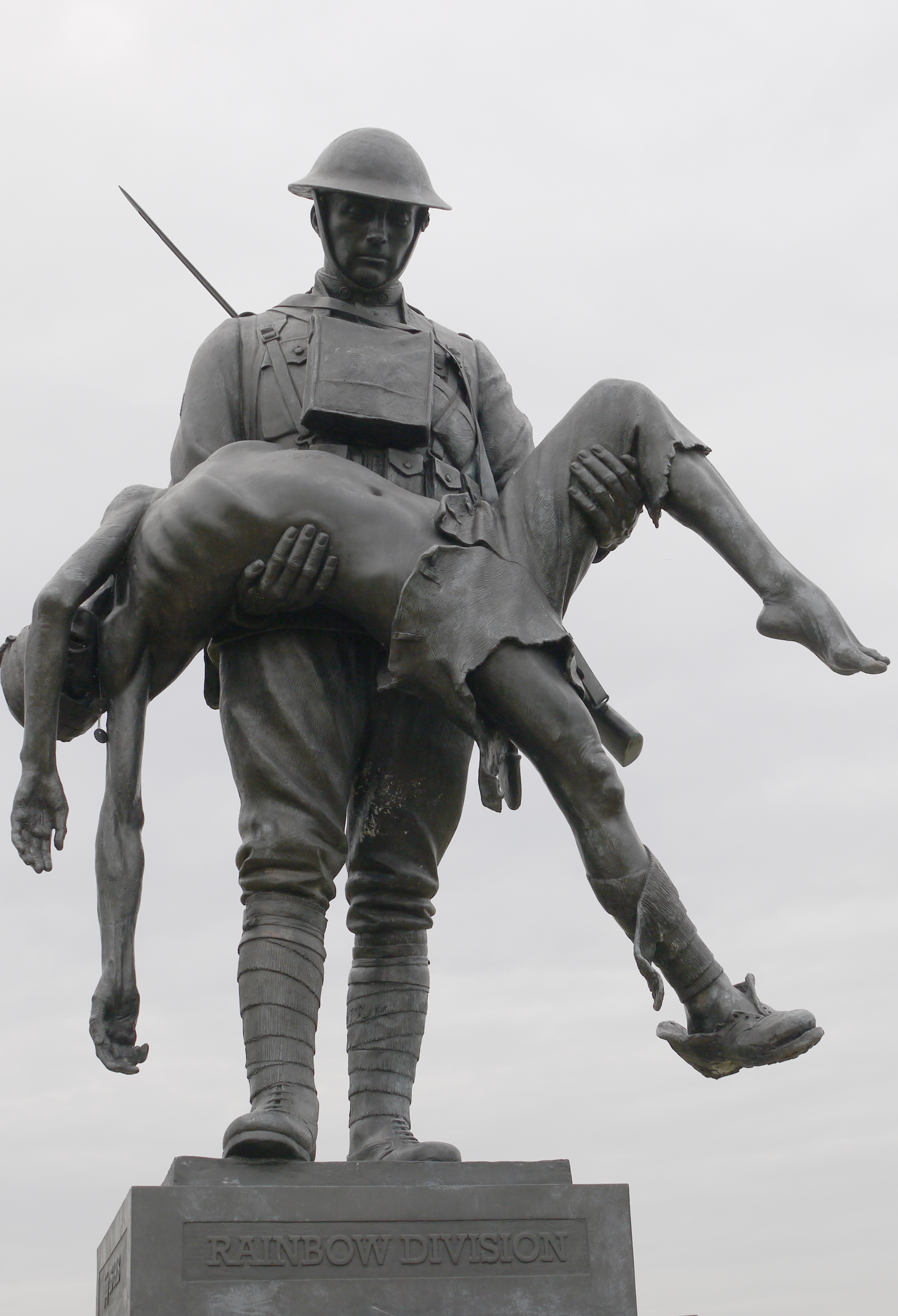
Memorial in Fère-en-Tardenois (France).

"On February 13, 1918, the day that the [3-day] inspection [by General Pershing's headquarter's staff] from Chaumont was completed, Pershing ordered the 42nd division to move to the Lunéville sector of southern Lorraine for a month's training at the front with the French VII Corps". "Rainbow division entrained for the Lunéville sector on February 16, 1918, and it was joined by the 67th Field Artillery Brigade shortly thereafter. Rainbow's soldiers were distributed over the entire sixteen-mile front of the sector, from Lunéville past St. Clément to Baccarat. As far as administration, supply, and discipline were concerned, the division was part of Major general Hunter Liggett's I Corps, A.E.F., but for combat and training purposes it was under Major General Georges de Bazelaire, of the French 7th Army Corps, with each of the 42nd's regiments assigned to one of the French Divisions holding the sector. Each American battalion served one week at a time on the front line, then spent the next week on the second line of defense, and the third week in reserve Acute shortages of some types of equipment still existed, as evidenced, for example, by Menoher's order that troops of a battalion leaving the front line were to yield their pistols to the men of the relieving battalion".

On 16 June 1918, General Pershing ordered the 42nd to entrain to "the Champagne region east of Rheims (a sector comparatively more active than Baccarat) to be assigned to General Henri Gouraud's Fourth Army"; relinquishing the current Baccarat sector "to the relieving American 77th and French 61st divisions".

During 1918, Rainbow division, specifically with the 67th Field Artillery's "1650 projectiles" in the Bois des Chiens, engaged German forces with and experienced bombardment by German forces with deadly, poison-gas bombardments, specifically with German 75-mm. and 105-mm. shells filled with palite and yperite (also known as Mustard gas). The 42nd took part in four major operations during the last four months of World War I: the Champagne-Marne, the Aisne-Marne, the Battle of Saint-Mihiel, and the Meuse-Argonne Offensive. In total, it saw 164 days of combat, third behind only the 1st Infantry Division (220 days) and 26th Infantry Division (193 days).

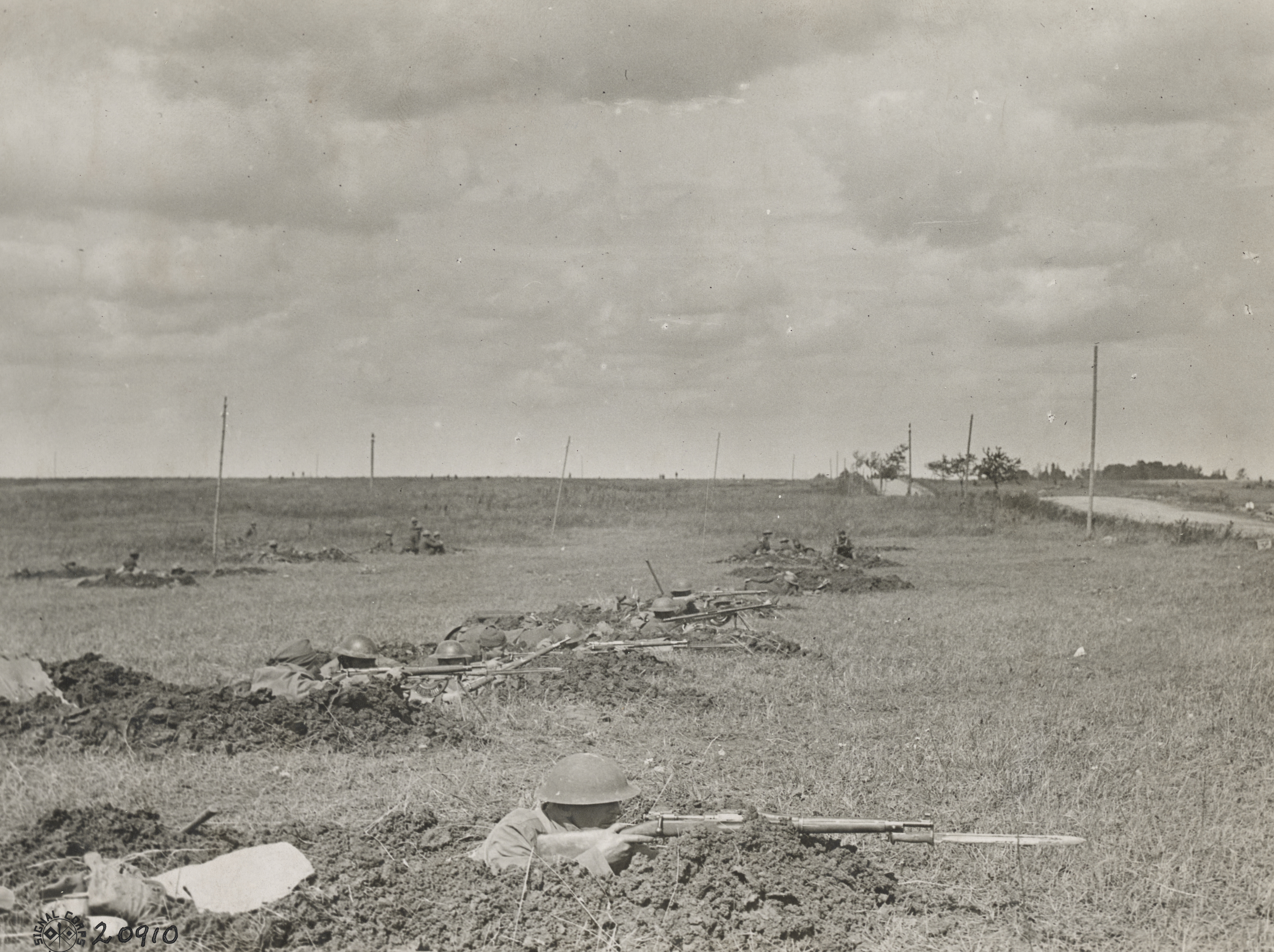
Soldiers of the 167th Infantry Regiment man positions near St. Benoit, on the Meuse River, during the St. Mihiel offensive, September 1918.

- Casualties: total 14,683 (KIA/DOW – 2,810; WIA – 11,873).
- Commanders: Maj. Gen. W. A. Mann (5 September 1917), Maj. Gen. Charles T. Menoher (19 December 1917), Maj. Gen. Charles D. Rhodes, (7 November 1918), Brig. Gen. Douglas MacArthur (10 November 1918), Maj. Gen. C. A. F. Flagler (22 November 1918), Brig. Gen. George G. Gatley (28 March 1919), Maj. Gen. George Windle Read (10 April 1919 to Division's deactivation on 9 May 1919).

The 42nd Division was demobilized in May 1919 at Camp Upton, New York, Camp Grant, Illinois, Camp Dix, New Jersey, and Camp Dodge, Iowa.

==== Rainbow division unit insignia ====
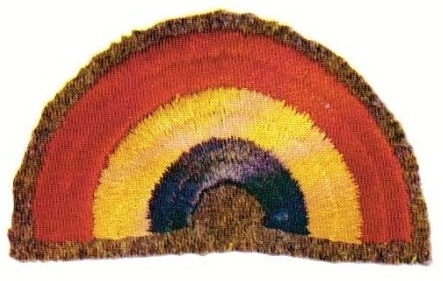
Original design of 42nd Infantry Division "Rainbow" patch, showing half arc. The patch was later modified to a quarter arc.

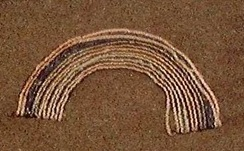
Another version of the original design of 42nd Infantry Division "Rainbow" patch, showing half arc.

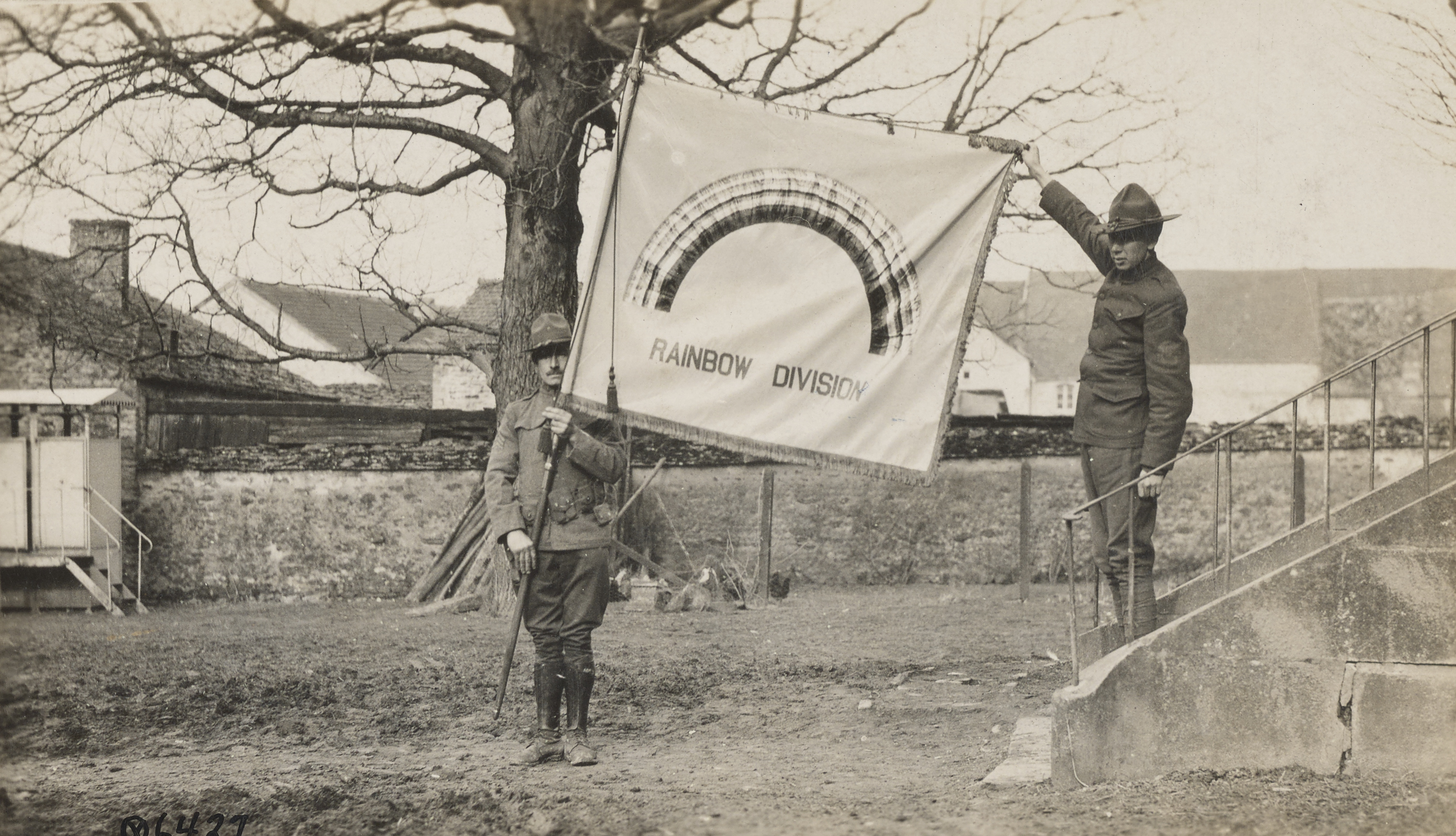
WW I colors unfurled for first time in France. Note half arc rainbow in design.

The 42nd Division adopted a shoulder patch and distinctive unit insignia acknowledging the nickname. Division lore includes the story that division commander Charles T. Menoher approved the patch after observing a rainbow shortly before a battle, deciding this was a favorable omen. The original version of the patch symbolized a half arc rainbow and contained thin bands in multiple colors. During the latter part of World War I and post war occupation duty in Germany, the patch was changed to a quarter arc. According to the division's official history, Colonel William N. Hughes Jr., who had succeeded MacArthur as chief of staff, was credited with modifying the design to a quarter arc in an attempt to standardize it. According to World War I veterans of the 42nd Division, soldiers removed half the original symbol to memorialize the half of the division's soldiers who had been killed or wounded during the war. They also reduced the number of colors to just red, gold and blue bordered in green, to standardize the design and make the patch easier to reproduce.

Description: The 4th quadrant of a rainbow with three bands of color: red, gold and blue, each 3/8-inch (.95 cm) in width, outer radius 2 inches (5.08 cm); all within a 1/8-inch (.32 cm) Army green border.

Background: The shoulder sleeve insignia was originally authorized by telegram on 29 October 1918. It was officially authorized for wear on 27 May 1922. It was reauthorized for wear when the division was reactivated for World War II. On 8 September 1947, it was authorized for the post-World War II 42nd Infantry Division when it was reactivated as a National Guard unit.

==== Order of battle ====
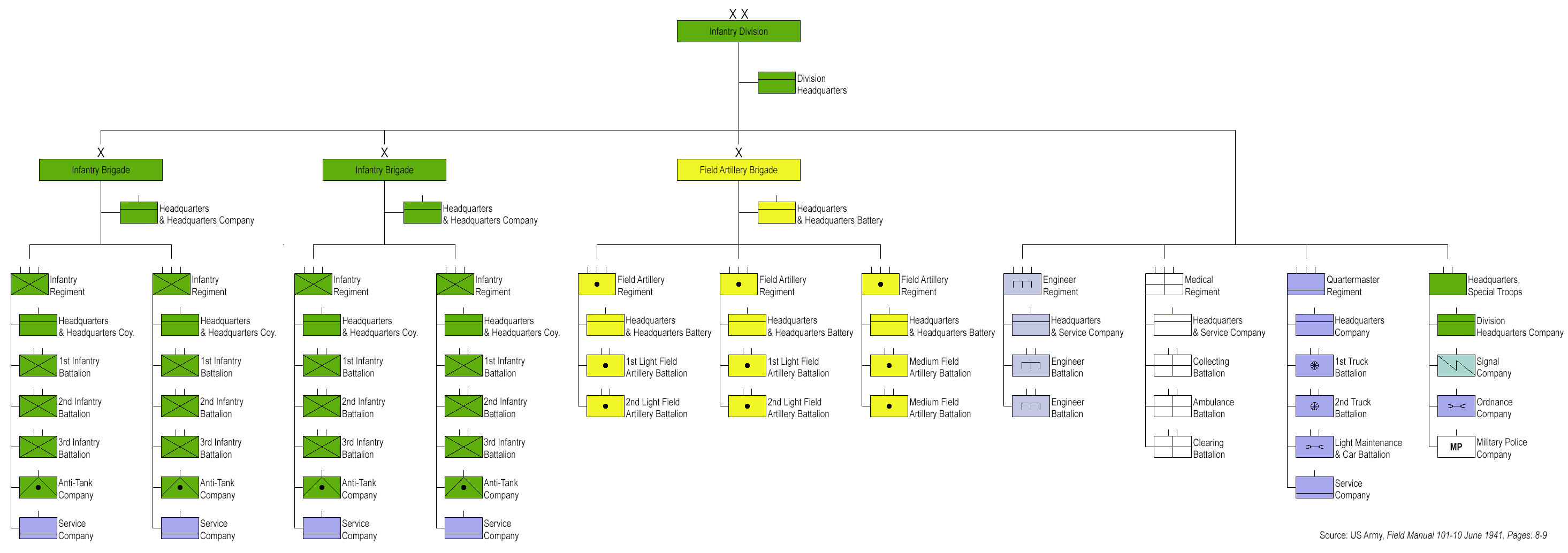
Square Division example: 1940 US Infantry Division. On the far left can be seen two Brigades of two Regiments each

- Headquarters, 42nd Division (future General of the Army, then Colonel Douglas MacArthur, served as the chief of staff of the 42nd Division)
- 83rd Infantry Brigade
  - 165th Infantry Regiment (formerly 69th Infantry, New York National Guard)
    - Notable members: Major William "Wild Bill" Donovan, Chaplain Francis P. Duffy, Sergeant Joyce Kilmer
    - Significant events: Rouge Bouquet
  - 166th Infantry Regiment (formerly 4th Infantry, Ohio National Guard)
  - 150th Machine Gun Battalion (formerly Companies E, F, and G, 2nd Infantry, Wisconsin National Guard)
- 84th Infantry Brigade (this was the brigade that Brigadier General Douglas MacArthur commanded from July 1918 to November 1918)
  - 167th Infantry Regiment (formerly 4th Infantry, Alabama National Guard)
  - 168th Infantry Regiment (formerly 3rd Infantry, Iowa National Guard)
  - 151st Machine Gun Battalion (formerly Companies B, C, and F, 2nd Infantry, Georgia National Guard)
- 67th Field Artillery Brigade
  - 149th Field Artillery Regiment (75 mm) (formerly 1st Field Artillery, Illinois National Guard)
  - 150th Field Artillery Regiment (155 mm) (formerly 1st Field Artillery, Indiana National Guard)
  - 151st Field Artillery Regiment (75 mm) (formerly 1st Field Artillery, Minnesota National Guard)
  - 117th Trench Mortar Battery (formerly 3rd and 4th Companies, Coast Artillery, Maryland National Guard)
- 149th Machine Gun Battalion (formerly 3rd Battalion, 4th Infantry, Pennsylvania National Guard)
- 117th Engineer Regiment (formerly Separate Battalions, Engineers, California and South Carolina National Guards)
- 117th Field Signal Battalion (formerly 1st Battalion, Signal Corps, Missouri National Guard)
- Headquarters Troop, 42nd Division (formerly 1st Separate Troop, Cavalry, Louisiana National Guard)
- 117th Train Headquarters and Military Police (formerly 1st and 2nd Companies, Coast Artillery, Virginia National Guard)
  - 117th Ammunition Train (formerly 1st Ammunition Train, Kansas National Guard)
  - 117th Supply Train (formerly Supply Train, Texas National Guard)
  - 117th Engineer Train (formerly Engineer Train, North Carolina National Guard)
  - 117th Sanitary Train (165th–168th Ambulance Companies and Field Hospitals)
    - 165th Ambulance Company (formerly 1st Ambulance Company, Michigan National Guard)
    - 165th Field Hospital (formerly 1st Field Hospital, Washington, D.C. National Guard)
    - 166th Ambulance Company (formerly 1st Ambulance Company, New Jersey National Guard)
    - 166th Field Hospital (formerly 1st Field Hospital, Nebraska National Guard)
    - 167th Ambulance Company (formerly 1st Ambulance Company, Tennessee National Guard)
    - 167th Field Hospital (formerly 1st Field Hospital, Oregon National Guard)
    - 168th Ambulance Company (formerly 1st Ambulance Company, Oklahoma National Guard)
    - 168th Field Hospital (formerly 1st Field Hospital, Colorado National Guard

=== Interwar period ===
As the 42nd was a composite division, it was not contemplated for reorganization after World War I, and all of its former elements were assigned to other National Guard divisions or remained demobilized.

=== World War II ===
- Activated: 14 July 1943
- Overseas: November 1944.
- Campaigns: Ardennes-Alsace, Rhineland, Central Europe.
- Days of combat: 106.
- Prisoners of war taken: 59,128.
- Presidential Unit Citation: 2.
- Awards: MH-1; DSC-14 (1 cluster); DSM-1; SS-622; LM-9; SM-32; BSM-5,325; AM-104.
- Commanders: Maj. Gen. Harry J. Collins commanded the 42ID during its entire period of federal service in World War II.
- Deactivated: 29 June 1946 in Europe.

==== Division organization ====
The 42nd Infantry Division consisted of the following units.

42nd Infantry Division organization (click to enlarge)

- 42nd Infantry Division
  - 42nd Infantry Division Headquarters
  - 42nd Cavalry Reconnaissance Troop (Mechanized) (M3 scout cars and then M8 Greyhound armored cars)
  - 222nd Infantry Regiment
    - Headquarters and Headquarters Company
    - 3× Infantry battalions
      - each battalion consists of: 1× Headquarters and Headquarters Company, 3× Rifle companies, 1× Heavy Weapons Company
    - Cannon Company (T12 Gun Motor Carriages and T19 Howitzer Motor Carriages, later replaced by either M3 105mm towed howitzers or M7 Priest self propelled howitzers)
    - Anti-Tank Company (M3 37mm anti-tank guns, which were replaced by 1944 with M1 57mm anti-tank guns)
    - Service Company
  - 232nd Infantry Regiment
    - same organization as 222nd Infantry Regiment
  - 242nd Infantry Regiment
    - same organization as 222nd Infantry Regiment
  - 42nd Infantry Division Artillery
    - Headquarters and Headquarters Battery
    - 232nd Field Artillery Battalion
      - Headquarters and Headquarters Battery
      - 3× Batteries (M2 105mm towed howitzers)
      - Service Battery
    - 392nd Field Artillery Battalion
      - same organization as 232nd Field Artillery Battalion
    - 402nd Field Artillery Battalion
      - same organization as 232nd Field Artillery Battalion
    - 542nd Field Artillery Battalion
      - Headquarters and Headquarters Battery
      - 3× Batteries (M1 155mm towed howitzers)
      - Service Battery
  - Headquarters Special Troops
    - Headquarters Company, 42nd Infantry Division
    - 132nd Signal Company
    - 42nd Quartermaster Company
    - 742nd Ordnance Light Maintenance Company
    - Military Police Platoon
    - 42nd Infantry Division Band (attached)
  - 142nd Engineer Combat Battalion
    - Headquarters and Headquarters and Service Company
    - 3× Engineer combat companies
  - 122nd Medical Battalion
    - Headquarters and Headquarters Detachment
    - 3× Collecting companies
    - Clearing Company

==== Training ====
When reconstituted in the Army of the United States on 5 February 1943, the 42nd Infantry Division was a unique unit, as it continued the lineage of the Rainbow Division from World War I. The division was officially activated on 14 July 1943 at Camp Gruber, Oklahoma. The officer and enlisted cadre came from the 102nd Infantry Division and from personnel stationed at bases in Hawaii and Newfoundland, while the enlisted fillers came from every state; from the division's activation until it stood down in Austria, the division displayed not only the national and divisional colors, but all 48 state colors (state flags) at every formal assembly. To emphasize the 42ID's continued lineage from the 42ID of World War I, division commander Major General Harry J. Collins issued the orders that activated the unit on 14 July, the eve of the twenty-fifth anniversary of the Champagne-Marne campaign in France.

From January to September 1944, the 42nd Infantry Division suffered personnel turnover amounting to 15,000 men as a result of successive War Department policies stating that stateside units could be used to supplement the capacity of replacement training centers and that no men who were nineteen or younger or who had children conceived prior to the Japanese attack on Pearl Harbor with less than six months of training should be sent overseas as individual replacements unless men could be found from other sources. During the first four months of 1944, chiefly in February, the division's three infantry regiments lost 5,600 men. From April ("when the initial age rules began to have a substantial effect") until large-scale withdrawals ceased in mid-July, a further 3,936 infantrymen, 840 field artillerymen, and 45 cavalrymen were withdrawn. The division was then ordered to start an abbreviated training program from the ground up. In mid-October 1944, 25% of the men in the division's regiments had been members since January 1944 or before, 20% had joined from replacement training centers during the past thirty days, 20% were former Army Specialized Training Program students or aviation cadets with approximately five months of training in the division, and 35% were men from other arms, principally antiaircraft, with approximately four months of training in the division.

On 14 October 1944, the three infantry regiments were alerted for imminent overseas movement, and the entire division was restricted to Camp Gruber. The disruption caused by the withdrawal of personnel and advancement of readiness dates meant that the division did not get the chance to participate in major division-versus-division maneuvers.

==== Combat chronicle ====
The three infantry regiments (222nd, 232nd, & 242nd) and a detachment of the 42ID Headquarters arrived in France at Marseille on 8 to 9 December 1944, and were formed into Task Force (TF) Linden, under Henning Linden, the Assistant Division Commander (ADC). As part of the Seventh Army's VI Corps, TF Linden entered combat in the vicinity of Strasbourg, relieving elements of the 36ID on 24 December 1944.

While defending on a 31-mile sector along the Rhine north and south of Strasbourg in January 1945, TF Linden repulsed a number of enemy counterattacks at Hatten and other locations during the German "Operation Northwind" offensive. At the headquarters of 1st Battalion, 242nd Infantry, Private First Class Vito R. Bertoldo waged a 48-hour defense of the battalion command post, for which he received the Medal of Honor. When the command post was attacked by a German tank with its 88-mm. gun and machine gun fire, Bertoldo remained at his post, and with his own machine gun killed the occupants of the tank when they tried to remove mines which were blocking their advance. On 24 and 25 January 1945, in the Bois D'Ohlungen, and the vicinity of Schweighouse-sur-Moder and Neubourg, the 222nd Infantry Regiment held a position covering a front of 7,500 yards, three times the normal frontage for a regiment in defense. After a two-hour artillery bombardment, the 222nd Infantry Regiment was repeatedly attacked by elements of the German 7th Parachute, 47th Volks Grenadier Division, and the 25th Panzer Grenadier Division. During the ensuing struggle, one company of the 222nd Infantry was surrounded, but withdrew from their position and infiltrated back through the Germans to the regimental lines after exhausting all but 35 rounds of ammunition. For 24 hours, the battle raged, but the Germans were never able to break through the 222nd lines. For this action the 222nd Infantry Regiment was awarded the Presidential Unit Citation (2001). After these enemy attacks, TF Linden returned to reserve of the 7th Army and trained with the remainder of the 42ID which had arrived in the meantime.

On 14 February 1945, the 42ID as a whole entered combat. Initially occupying defensive positions near Haguenau, after a month of patrolling in the Hardt Forest, the division went on the offensive. During the night of 27 February, elements of the German 6th Mountain Division were withdrawn under cover of heavy artillery and mortar fire and replaced by the 221st Volksgrenadier Regiment. In the brief period this unit had been in the line, German soldiers had come to fear the 42nd Division's patrols and raids. "Is your Division a part of Roosevelt's SS?" asked one German when captured. The remark circulated and men kidded each other about being in the Rainbow SS. The 42ID attacked through the Hardt Forest during 15 to 21 March, broke through the Siegfried Line, and cleared Dahn and Busenberg, while Third Army created and expanded bridgeheads across the Rhine. Moving across the Rhine on 31 March, the division captured Wertheim am Main on 1 April and Würzburg on 6 April, following a fierce battle from 2 to 6 April. Schweinfurt fell next after hand-to-hand engagements during the period of 9 to 12 April. Fürth, near Nuremberg, put up fanatical resistance on 18 and 19 April but was taken by the 42ID.

On 25 April, the 42ID captured Donauwörth on the Danube. On 29 April, units of the 42nd Division liberated some 30,000 inmates at Dachau concentration camp. In mid-May, 42nd Division patrols arrested German war criminal Arthur Greiser and Waffen-SS officer Heinz Reinefarth.

==== Casualties ====
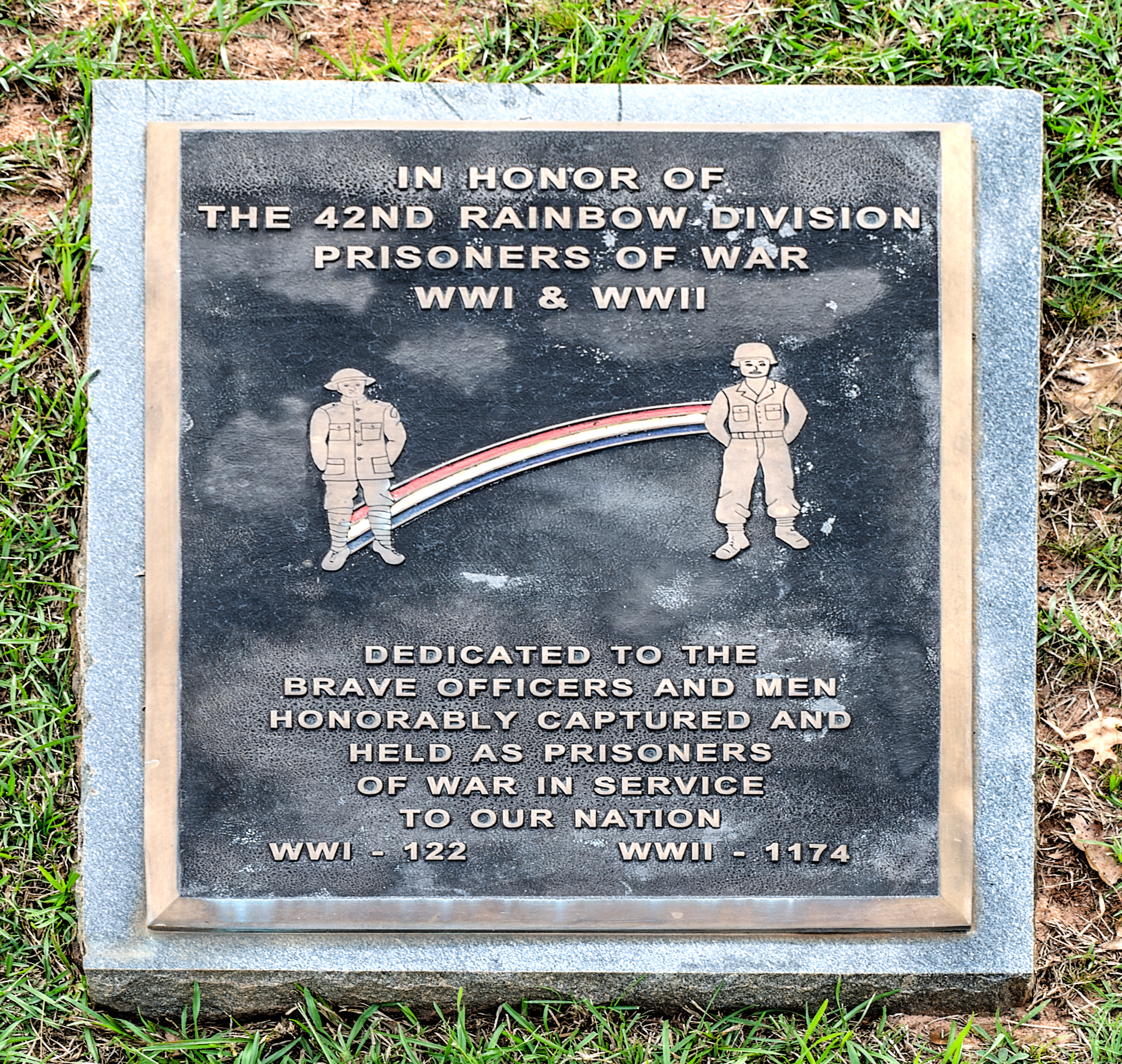
Memorial at Andersonville National Historic Site

- Total battle casualties: 3,971
- Killed in action: 553
- Wounded in action: 2,212
- Missing in action: 31
- Prisoner of war: 1,175

==== Assignments in Europe ====
- 10 December 1944: Seventh Army, 6th Army Group
- 15 December 1944: Third Army, 12th Army Group
- 24 December 1944: VI Corps, Seventh Army, 6th Army Group
- 25 March 1945: XXI Corps, Seventh Army, 6th Army Group
- 19 April 1945: XV Corps, Seventh Army, 6th Army Group

The 42nd Division ended World War II on occupation duty in Austria and was inactivated by the end of January 1947.

=== Cold War ===
On 13 October 1945, the War Department published a postwar policy statement for the entire Army. After the policy statement was published, the Army Staff prepared a postwar National Guard troop basis, which included twenty-four divisions, including the 42nd Infantry Division. Most soldiers considered the 42nd, initially organized with state troops in 1917, as a Guard formation. During the process, New York successfully petitioned the War Department for all units of the 42nd Infantry Division. After the state governors formally notified the National Guard Bureau that they accepted the new troop allotments, the bureau authorized reorganization of the units with 100 percent of their officers and 80 percent of their enlisted personnel. By September 1947, the 42nd Division headquarters, along with all the other new Guard divisional headquarters, had received federal recognition.

In April 1963, the 42nd Division was reorganized under the Reorganization Objective Army Division structure. From 1967 to 1969, the division was briefly part of the Selected Reserve Force, designed to reinforce the active army in Vietnam. In a 1968 reorganization, the division was split between the New York Army National Guard and the Pennsylvania Army National Guard. In 1973–74, the division was converted back into an all-New York organization.

In the 1970s, the division headquarters was located at the armory at 125 West 14th Street in Manhattan. It was relocated in December 1989 to the Glenmore Armory in Troy, New York and remains there to this day.

In post-Cold War restructuring of the early 1990s, the 42nd Infantry Division absorbed the units of the 26th Infantry Division and the 50th Armored Division of the Massachusetts and New Jersey Army National Guard, respectively, All three divisions were severely understrength, so the assets of the three were combined into one. The 50th Brigade, created from the assets of the disbanding 50th Armored Division, was then assigned to the 42nd Infantry Division as an armored brigade.

== Twenty-first century ==
The 50th Brigade was reorganized as an infantry brigade combat team (BCT) in the very first years of the 21st century as part of Army modularity.

The day of the September 11 terrorist attacks, the division's 1st Squadron, 101st Cavalry, led the New York Army National Guard's efforts and provided security at Ground Zero during the rescue and then recovery efforts there. 42ID units from the New Jersey Army National Guard provided security at all the major river crossings into New York City and Newark International Airport in the months following 11 September 2001.

=== Guantanamo base guard tour ===
The first major overseas effort of the division was the deployment of elements of the 50th Brigade Combat Team to Guantanamo Bay Naval Base, Cuba. The 2–102nd Armor Battalion deployed as ILO MP's and served with the Joint Detention Operation Group in the detention facility. The 2nd Battalion, 113th Infantry deployed to Guantanamo Bay as well and provided security for the Joint Task Force at Camp Delta. While there elements of the 2nd Battalion, 102nd Armor supported the first military tribunals held at the Guantanamo Bay Detention Facility. Elements have also deployed to the Horn of Africa and Djibouti.

=== Iraq ===
New Jersey's 3/112th Field Artillery and 5/117th Cavalry deployed as an ILO Military Police Company with 89th MP Brigade/759th Military Police Battalion; served in Sadr City, and worked alongside the 1st Cavalry Division. Stationed out of Camp Cuervo (Al Rustimayah) in Baghdad, platoons also worked with U.S. Marines in Fallujah. On 4 June 2004, SSG Carvill and SGT Duffy were killed and the following day the unit lost SPC Doltz and SSG Timoteo.

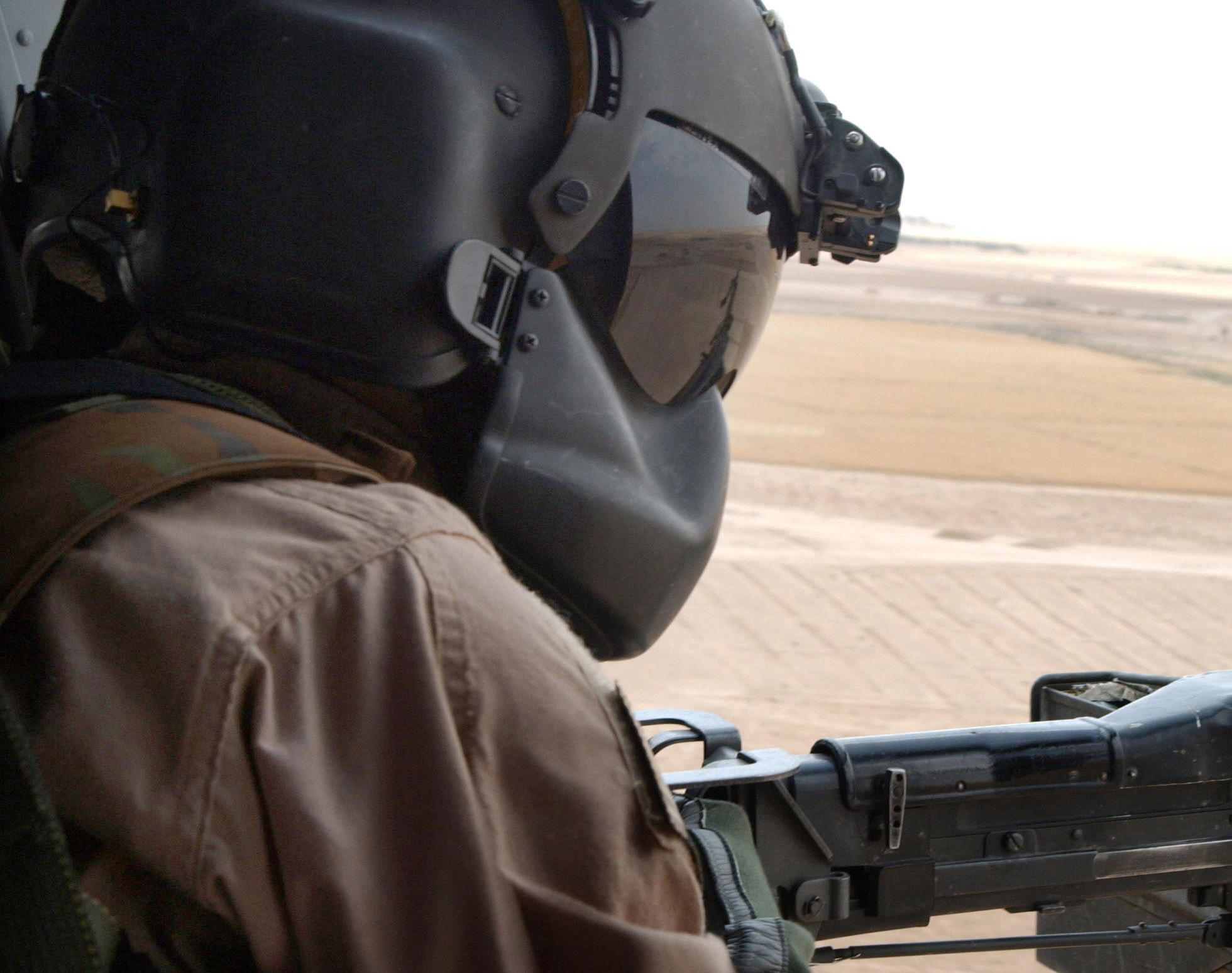
Sgt. Rikki Sanchez, from the 150th General Support Aviation Battalion, 42nd Infantry Division, mans an M60D machine gun during a UH-60 Blackhawk mission in northern Iraq.

The 2/108th Infantry deployed to Iraq in 2004. In 2004–05, the 1/69 Infantry served in Iraq, eventually providing security on the Baghdad International Airport (BIAP) Road. The 42nd Combat Aviation Brigade also deployed to Iraq during this period.

In 2004, the division headquarters and division troops of the 42nd Infantry Division deployed as part of Operation Iraqi Freedom (OIF) III, relieving the 1st Infantry Division (1ID). The division controlled the north-central Iraq area of operations. Entitled Task Force Liberty for the deployment, the division headquarters took over responsibility for the area known as Multi-National Division North Central (MND-NC) including the provinces of Saladin, Diyala, At Ta'amim (Kirkuk) and As Sulymaniah from the 1st Infantry Division on 14 February 2005. The 42ID directed the operations of: 1st Brigade Combat Team, 3rd Infantry Division; 3rd BCT, 3rd Infantry Division; the 278th Armored Cavalry Regiment; 3rd Battalion, 313th Field Artillery, 56th BCT (Texas Army National Guard); and the 116th Cavalry Brigade Combat Team (Idaho, Oregon, and Montana Army National Guard). Soldiers conducted combat actions and raids, seized weapons caches, destroyed improvised explosive devices (IEDs), trained Iraqi Army forces, and worked on reconstruction to ensure free elections. The division's 1st Battalion, 69th Infantry (1-69 INF) manned the checkpoint where Italian SISMI officer Nicola Calipari was shot and killed.

Maj. Gen. Joseph J. Taluto, commanding general of the division during its deployment, commended the many contributions of the 42ID-led Task Force Liberty. Vice Chief of Staff of the Army, General Richard Cody, saluted members of the division at the unit's homecoming ceremony. The division's Headquarters and Headquarters Company was awarded the Army Meritorious Unit Commendation for its service in Iraq.

In 2008, 26 company-sized elements of the 50th Infantry Brigade Combat Team (IBCT), headquartered at Fort Dix, New Jersey, deployed to Iraq bringing the total number of NJ National Guard soldiers sent to Iraq and Afghanistan to over 3,200. These elements of the 50th IBCT were mobilized for one year, including stateside training and "boots on the ground" in theater. Premobilization training began in 2007 and took place in New Jersey, with further OIF specific preparation conducted at other Army installations out-of-state. Originally slated to deploy to Iraq in 2010, these elements deployed earlier as a result of changes needed to comply with new Department of Defense (DoD) policies. Earlier, in 2007, the DoD had reduced the amount of time units spend overseas in a combat theater, which in turn shifted mobilization schedules and required earlier deployments than anticipated. Elements of the 50th IBCT had deployed in support of Operation Iraqi Freedom (OIF) previously in 2004.

=== Deaths of Esposito and Allen ===
Captain Phillip Esposito and First Lieutenant Louis Allen were killed on 7 June 2005, at Forward Operating Base Danger in Tikrit, Iraq by a M18A1 Claymore mine placed in the window of Esposito's office. Esposito was the commander of the Headquarters and Headquarters Company, 42ID, while Allen had recently arrived in Iraq to serve as Esposito's executive officer, or second in command.

Military investigators determined that the mine was deliberately placed and detonated with the intention of killing Esposito and Allen. Staff Sergeant Alberto B. Martinez, from the officers' unit, was charged in the killing but was acquitted in a court-martial trial at Fort Bragg, North Carolina, on 4 December 2008. The case was one of only two publicly announced alleged fragging incidents among U.S. forces during the Iraq War.

Subsequently, Siobhan Esposito and Barbara Allen, the widows of the officers, continued to pursue justice for their husbands' deaths, pushing for the Army to strictly enforce regulations that prohibit threats against superiors and require soldiers to report violations of "good order and discipline."

=== Afghanistan ===
In 2008, the 27th Infantry Brigade Combat Team (IBCT), headquartered in Syracuse, New York, was mobilized and deployed to Afghanistan to train Afghan National Army and police forces. Initial personnel from the 27th IBCT deployed in late 2007, with the majority of the approximately 1,700 service members deployed by mid-2008.

In conjunction around February 2008, soldiers of the 86th Infantry Brigade Combat Team were beginning to receive notification of their upcoming deployment. The Brigade Commander at the time was Colonel William F. Roy. In 2009, the brigade did a rotation at JRTC in Fort Polk, LA. In December 2009, the brigade was officially mobilized and to report to Camp Atterbury, IN. While in Indiana, the brigade trained and prepped for their future deployment to Afghanistan. After receiving numerous replacements and volunteer soldiers, the brigade was sent back to JRTC for one more rotation before they left the country.

The majority of the brigade landed in Afghanistan in early March. The brigade headquarters was on Bagram Airfield in Regional Command East. The brigade was tasked with numerous missions across eastern Afghanistan. The missions included partnering with the Afghan Armed Forces, Afghan Police, and other security forces, assisting in the Government of the Islamic Republic of Afghanistan, and securing over 30,000 soldiers on Bagram Airfield while ensuring the base was continuing its daily operations. The brigade left Afghanistan in early December returning to Camp Atterbury, IN. The brigade was released from federal service and returned to the northeast to continue their respective state missions. Several component units of the brigade were awarded the Meritorious Unit Commendation for their service from 8 March 2010 – 4 December 2010 while deployed in support of Operation Enduring Freedom.

=== Task Force Spartan ===
In the 2020 and again in 2025, elements of the 42ID were deployed to Kuwait as part of Task Force Spartan.

== Homeland security ==
During the Cold War and through the present, the 42ID and its soldiers have been regularly called upon for homeland security missions including disaster relief (such as Hurricane Katrina, Hurricane Floyd), emergency preparedness (such as Y2K missions), airport security, critical infrastructure protection, border security, bridge and tunnel security, as well as rail/train station security.

Several first responders to the 11 September 2001 attacks were members of the 42ID, and led much of the military support to the relief and recovery efforts. The 42ID was part of the relief team for the duration of the effort at Ground Zero in New York City. The 42ID has also been actively engaged in missions supporting Operation Noble Eagle.

In October 2005, elements of the 50th Armored Brigade/42 ID were activated for Operation Hurricane Katrina relief in the city of New Orleans. The 2–102nd Armor and the 1–114th Infantry were called to active duty and the combined unit was dispatched to Louisiana to provide security for FEMA. The 50th Brigade arrived at Belle Chase Naval Air Station and from there went to the New Orleans Convention Center. From there, the elements of the 42nd ID sent teams to various parts of the city on various missions of security ranging from roving patrol to security escort for the New Orleans Fire Department and other relief agencies

== Division organization in 2026 ==
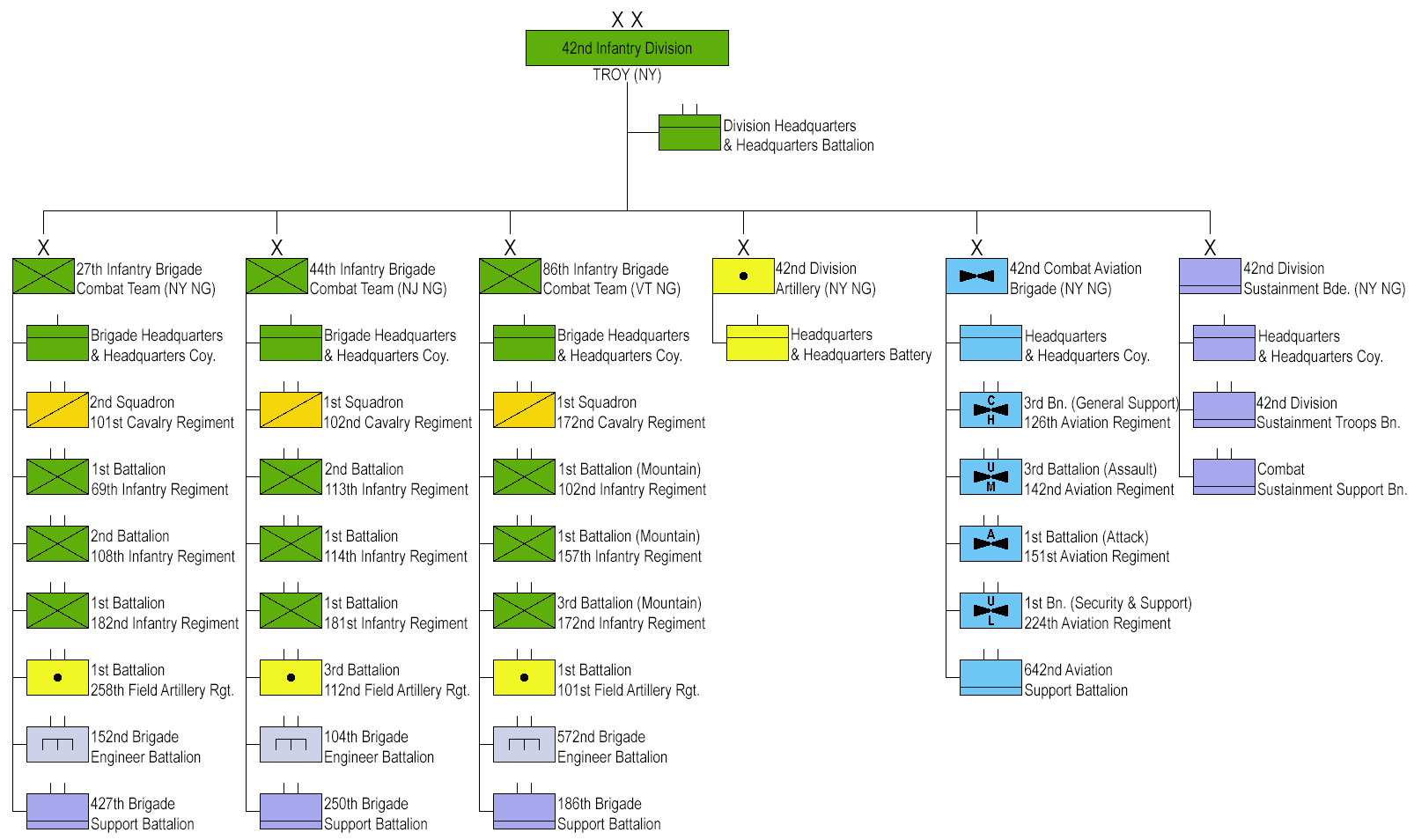
42nd Infantry Division organization February 2026 (click to enlarge)

The 42nd Infantry Division exercises training and readiness oversight of the following units:

- 42nd Infantry Division (NY NG)
  - Headquarters and Headquarters Battalion
  - 27th Infantry Brigade Combat Team (NY NG)
    - Headquarters and Headquarters Company
    - 2nd Squadron, 101st Cavalry Regiment
    - 1st Battalion, 69th Infantry Regiment
    - 2nd Battalion, 108th Infantry Regiment
    - 1st Battalion, 182nd Infantry Regiment (MA NG)
    - 1st Battalion, 258th Field Artillery Regiment
    - 152nd Brigade Engineer Battalion
    - 427th Brigade Support Battalion
  - 44th Infantry Brigade Combat Team (NJ NG)
    - Headquarters and Headquarters Company
    - 1st Squadron, 102nd Cavalry Regiment (RSTA)
    - 2nd Battalion, 113th Infantry Regiment
    - 1st Battalion, 114th Infantry Regiment
    - 1st Battalion, 181st Infantry Regiment (MA NG)
    - 3rd Battalion, 112th Field Artillery Regiment
    - 104th Brigade Engineer Battalion
    - 250th Brigade Support Battalion
  - 86th Infantry Brigade Combat Team (Mountain) (VT NG)
    - Headquarters and Headquarters Company
    - 1st Squadron, 172nd Cavalry Regiment (RSTA)
    - 1st Battalion, 102nd Infantry Regiment (Mountain) (CT NG)
    - 1st Battalion, 157th Infantry Regiment (Mountain) (CO NG)
    - 3rd Battalion, 172nd Infantry Regiment (Mountain) (VT NG, NH NG, ME NG)
    - 1st Battalion, 101st Field Artillery Regiment (MA NG)
    - 572nd Brigade Engineer Battalion
    - 186th Brigade Support Battalion
  - 42nd Division Artillery (NY NG)
    - Headquarters and Headquarters Battery
  - 42nd Combat Aviation Brigade (NY NG)
    - Headquarters and Headquarters Company
    - 3rd Battalion (General Support), 126th Aviation Regiment (MA NG, VT NG, MD NG)
    - 3rd Battalion (Assault), 142nd Aviation Regiment
    - 1st Battalion (Attack/Recon), 151st Aviation Regiment (SC NG)
    - 1st Battalion (Security and Support), 224th Aviation Regiment (MD NG)
    - 642nd Aviation Support Battalion
  - 42nd Infantry Division Sustainment Brigade (NY NG)
    - Headquarters and Headquarters Company
    - 42nd Special Troops Battalion
    - Division Sustainment Support Battalion

=== Attached units ===
- 26th Maneuver Enhancement Brigade (MA NG)
  - Headquarters and Headquarters Company
  - 211th Military Police Battalion
  - 26th Network Signal Company
- 197th Field Artillery Brigade (NH NG)
  - Headquarters and Headquarters Battery
  - 1st Battalion, 103rd Field Artillery Regiment (M777A2, RI NG)
  - 1st Battalion, 109th Field Artillery Regiment (M109A6 Paladin, PA NG)
  - 1st Battalion, 119th Field Artillery Regiment (M777A2, MI NG)
  - 1st Battalion, 182nd Field Artillery Regiment (M142 HIMARS, MI NG)
  - 3rd Battalion, 197th Field Artillery Regiment (M142 HIMARS, NH NG)
  - 1st Battalion, 201st Field Artillery Regiment (M109A6 Paladin, WV NG)
  - 3643rd Brigade Support Battalion (NH NG)
  - Battery E, 197th Field Artillery Regiment (NH NG)
  - 372nd Signal Company (NH NG)

== Commanders of the 42nd Infantry Division ==
- BG Richard P. Cipro 2026–present
- MG Jack A. James Jr., 2024–2026
- MG Joseph L. Biehler, 2024
- MG Thomas F. Spencer, 2021–2024
- MG Steven Ferrari, 2017–2021
- MG Harry E. Miller Jr., 2013–2017
- MG Steven N. Wickstrom, 2009–2013
- BG Paul C. Genereux, 2006–2009
- MG Joseph J. Taluto, 2002–2006
- MG George T. Garrett, 1999–2002
- MG Thomas D. Kinley, 1996–1999
- MG Robert J. Byrne 1993–1996
- MG John W. Cudmore, 1991–1993
- MG Martin E. Lind, 1989–1991
- BG Richard Evans, 1987–1989
- BG Martin E. Lind, 1986–1987
- MG Bernard G. Ehrlich, 1985–1986
- MG Vincent W. Lanna, 1983–1985
- MG Joseph A. Healey, 1978–1983
- MG Howard G. Garrison, 1977–1978
- MG Harold R. Story 1975–1977
- MG John C. Baker, 1973–1975
- MG Martin H. Foery, 1963–1973
- MG Charles Coudert Nast, 1957–1963
- MG Brendan A. Burns, 1948–1957
- MG Cornelius Wendell Wickersham, 1946–1948

=== World War II ===
- MG Harry J. Collins, 1943–1946

=== World War I ===
- MG George Windle Read, 1919
- BG George G. Gatley, 1919
- MG Clement Flagler, 1918–1919
- BG Douglas MacArthur, 1918
- MG Charles Dudley Rhodes, 1918
- MG Charles T. Menoher, 1917–1918
- MG William Abram Mann, 1917

== Notable former members ==
- Vito Bertoldo, World War II, Medal of Honor
- Boris Bittker, World War II, law professor
- George Emerson Brewer, World War I, surgeon
- Joseph W. Brooks, World War I, college football coach
- Wilber M. Brucker, World War I, United States Secretary of the Army
- Robert Burns, World War II, member of the Iowa Senate
- Frank Merrill Caldwell, World War I, 83rd Infantry Brigade commander
- Kenneth John Conant, World War I, architectural historian
- Hamilton Corbett, World War I, college football player and businessman
- Scott Corbett, World War II, journalist and author
- W. Arthur Cunningham, World War I, New York City Comptroller
- Roger W. Cutler Jr., World War II, athlete, attorney and banker
- Reginald B. DeLacour, World War I, adjutant general of Connecticut
- John L. DeWitt, World War I, U.S. Army four-star general
- Michael A. Donaldson, World War I, Medal of Honor
- William J. Donovan, World War I, Medal of Honor
- Francis P. Duffy, World War I, Catholic priest and army chaplain
- Francis J. Evon Jr., Operation Enduring Freedom, Connecticut Adjutant General
- Samuel Warren Hamilton, World War I, psychiatrist
- Thomas S. Hammond, World War I, business executive
- Thomas T. Handy, World War I, U.S. Army four-star general
- Thomas Francis Hickey, World War II, U.S. Army lieutenant general
- Lisa J. Hou, Operation Iraqi Freedom, Adjutant general of the New Jersey National Guard
- Benson W. Hough, World War I, judge of the United States District Court for the Southern District of Ohio
- Kevin Interdonato, Operation Iraqi Freedom, actor
- Olin D. Johnston, World War I, U.S. senator
- Louis Jordan, World War I, college football player
- Joyce Kilmer, World War I, journalist and poet
- Rory Lancman, Cold War, member of the New York State Assembly and New York City Council
- Bruce M. Lawlor, Global war on terrorism, U.S. Army major general
- George E. Leach, World War I, mayor of Minneapolis
- Michael Joseph Lenihan, World War I, 83rd Brigade commander
- Ralph Linton, World War I, anthropologist
- Charles MacArthur, World War I, author
- Sidney E. Manning, World War I, Medal of Honor
- Jeff W. Mathis III, Cold War, U.S. Army major general
- Moose McCormick, World War I, professional baseball player, director of the United States Army Air Forces during World War II
- Thomas C. Neibaur, World War I, Medal of Honor
- Donald A. Quarles, World War I, United States Deputy Secretary of Defense
- Richard W. O'Neill, World War I, Medal of Honor
- Todd Pillion, Operation Iraqi Freedom, member of the Virginia Senate
- B. Carroll Reece, World War I, U.S. congressman
- Henry J. Reilly, World War I, author and journalist
- Louis W. Ross, World War I, architect
- Richard J. Tallman, World War II, U.S. Army brigadier general
- John C. F. Tillson, World War II, U.S. Army major general
- Robert Tyndall, World War I, mayor of Indianapolis
- James Ronald Warren, World War II, Historian
- Emmett Watson, World War I, illustrator
- Arthur Whittemore, World War I, associate justice of the Massachusetts Supreme Judicial Court

== In popular culture ==
The soldiers who provide security around the ghost-contaminated apartment building in the 1984 film Ghostbusters wear the uniform of the 42nd Infantry Division. The 42nd Infantry Division was featured in the 2008 monster film Cloverfield.

== See also ==
- Army National Guard
- Battle of the Bulge
- Rainbow Division Monument
- United States National Guard

== Sources ==
- Daly, Hugh C. (1946). "42nd "Rainbow" Infantry Division: A Combat History of World War II". World War Regimental Histories. Baton Rouge, LA: Army and Navy Publishing Company.
- The Army Almanac: A Book of Facts Concerning the Army of the United States U.S. Government Printing Office, 1950 reproduced at the United States Army Center of Military History.
- James J. Cooke, The Rainbow Division in the Great War, 1917–1919, Greenwood Publishing Group, Incorporated 1994 ISBN 0-275-94768-8
