= Vito J. Castellano =

Adjutant General of New York (1975–1986)

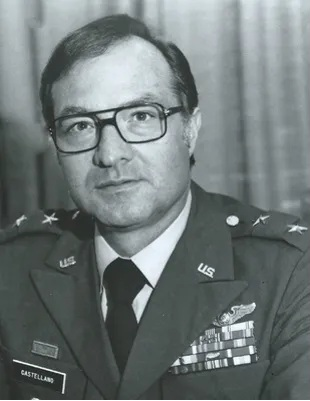
- Castellano c. 1980
- Born: 21 May 1925; Brooklyn, New York, US
- Died: 29 August 2019 (aged 94); Rockaway, Queens, New York, US
- Burial place: Holy Cross Cemetery, Brooklyn, New York
- Education: Air Command and Staff College; Air War College
- Spouse(s): Dorothy Williams (1948–1979), (1981–1987); Linda Castellano (1979–1981), (1982–c. 1988); Mary McGough (1993–2019)
- Children: 3
- Military career
- Service: United States Army Air Forces; New York Air National Guard; New York Army National Guard
- Service years: 1942–1947 (Army Air Forces); 1947–1965 (Air National Guard); 1975–1986 (Army National Guard)
- Rank: Major General
- Service number: AO–866387
- Unit: New York National Guard
- Commands: Adjutant General of New York
- Conflicts: World War II; Allied-occupied Austria
- Awards: Croix de Guerre with palm (France); Order of the Bath (Companion) (Great Britain); New York State Conspicuous Service Cross
- Other work: Corporate executive

Vito J. Castellano (21 May 1925 – 29 August 2019) was a career officer in the United States military. A veteran of World War II, he attained the rank of major general while serving as Adjutant General of New York from 1975 to 1986. During the Second World War, he served with the United States Army Air Forces. Following his wartime service, Castellano was a member of the New York Air National Guard. In 1975, he was appointed Adjutant General of New York and commander of the New York Army National Guard. He served until 1986, when he retired during the investigation of his role in the Wedtech scandal.

== Early life and start of career ==
Vito Joseph Castellano was born in Brooklyn, New York on 21 May 1925, a son of Gaetano "Tom" Castellano and Anna (Lococo) Castellano. (Note: Castellano's obituary and some other sources give his birth year as 1925. Some sources give it as 1924. According to the June 1925 New York State Census, Castellano was 21 days old, meaning the 1925 date is correct. Castellano gave his birth year as 1924 to make himself appear 18 in November 1942, the month and year he joined the military for World War II.) He attended the public schools of Brooklyn and graduated from Brooklyn Technical High School, then joined the military for World War II. Castellano joined the United States Army Air Forces and capitalized on his background as a ham radio operator to receive training in radio engineering.

In 1943, Castellano was selected for attendance at Officer Candidate School. He graduated in September, and received his commission as a second lieutenant. Assigned to communications officer duties with the Zone of the Interior, he was promoted to first lieutenant in July 1944. Later in 1944, Castellano was assigned to duty in the European theater, and he served in Italy until the end of the war. After V-E Day, Castellano remained on duty in Allied-occupied Austria, and he was promoted to captain in December 1945. He returned to the United States in April 1946 and performed communications officer duties with Headquarters, First Air Force at Fort Slocum, New York until receiving his discharge in April 1947.

=== Military education ===
Castellano completed the Army Air Forces Radio Operators and Mechanics School in 1943. Later that year, he completed the Radio Engineers Course. In 1953, Castellano graduated from the United States Air Force's Air–Ground Operations Specialist Course. He completed the Air Force's Civilian Personnel Administration Course in 1958. In 1958 and 1960, he completed iterations of the Air Force's Air War Systems Orientation Course. In 1960, he graduated from the Air Force's Space Systems Course. Castellano also attended the Air Command and Staff College and Air War College.

== Continued career ==
Upon leaving active duty, Castellano joined the newly organized New York Air National Guard and was assigned to the National Guard's full-time workforce as communications officer of the 52nd Fighter Wing. In December 1947, he was promoted to major and assigned as the wing's adjutant. In December 1950, he was promoted to lieutenant colonel and assigned as Air National Guard personnel officer at the New York National Guard's state headquarters. Castellano received promotion to colonel in December 1953. In November 1955, he was assigned as New York's assistant adjutant general for air. He received promotion to brigadier general in February 1960 and continued to serve as assistant adjutant general for air.

In June 1965, Castellano left the National Guard's full-time workforce and retired from the military so he could become executive vice president and a director of Hamilton Life Insurance Company. In November 1968, he was appointed as a consultant for an advisory committee created by the US Assistant Secretary of Defense for Manpower and Reserve Affairs. Also in November 1968, he was appointed to the state's Business Advisory Committee On Management Improvement. Additional businesses in which Castellano was interested included Jeta Power, Inc., of which he became a director in October 1969. In March 1974, Castellano was appointed first deputy commissioner of the New York State Department of Commerce. In 1975, he served as the department's acting commissioner.

== Later career ==
In December 1975, Castellano returned to military service when he was appointed to succeed John C. Baker as Adjutant General of New York and commander of the New York Army National Guard. (Note: New York's National Guard head was titled chief of staff to the governor from 1949 until 1988, when it was changed back to adjutant general.) Appointment of an Air National Guard officer required the individual to be on flight status; as a result, Castellano was commissioned in the Army National Guard when he assumed the adjutant general's post. He served as adjutant general until January 1986, when he was succeeded by Lawrence P. Flynn. Castellano's term was highlighted by the National Guard's response to a February 1977 blizzard and a 1979 strike by corrections officers at the state's prisons. He retired following negative publicity about legislation that would have raised his pension from $12,000 a year to $54,000; Castellano had been locked into an old pension system because of his prior military service, and the bill that passed the state legislature would have placed him on par with officers who had served more recently, but it was vetoed by Governor Mario Cuomo. At the time of Cuomo's veto, Castellano and the New York National Guard were being investigated for payroll padding and other mismanagement, which factored into Cuomo's decision.

Following his departure from the National Guard, Castellano was investigated as part of the Wedtech scandal, which involved bribery to obtain defense contracts; the scheme included Biaggi & Ehrlich, the law firm of Castellano's military colleague, Major General Bernard G. Ehrlich, and Congressman Mario Biaggi. Castellano accepted Wedtech cash, and in 1987 he pleaded guilty to state tax evasion charges. The investigation and subsequent trials also revealed that Castellano had committed bigamy by being married to his first and second wives at the same time. Castellano additionally admitted accepting a car and cash from Penthouse magazine publisher Bob Guccione in exchange for efforts to obtain the magazine a loan from a Buffalo bank and to maintain sales of Penthouse at military installations. Castellano testified against Ehrlich and others; Ehrlich was acquitted, largely because jurors believed Castellano's lies made him an unreliable witness. In 1988, Castellano was sentenced to one to three years in prison.

After leaving the military for the second time, Castellano worked in the Washington, DC office of the Beech Aircraft Corporation. In 1993, he married Mary McGough, who survived him. With his first wife, he was the father of three children. In retirement, Castellano lived in Rockaway, Queens, New York, where he died on 29 August 2019. He was buried at Holy Cross Cemetery in Brooklyn.

== Awards ==
Castellano's awards and decorations included:

- Army Commendation Ribbon
- American Campaign Medal
- European–African–Middle Eastern Campaign Medal with four bronze service stars
- Army of Occupation of Germany Medal
- World War II Victory Medal
- Armed Forces Reserve Medal
- Air Force Longevity Service Award
- New York State Conspicuous Service Cross
- New York State Long and Faithful Service Medal
- Presidential Unit Citation
- Croix de Guerre with palm (France)
- Order of the Bath (Companion) (Great Britain)
