= Michael Bowen Mitchell =

American lawyer and politician (born 1945)

Michael Bowen Mitchell Sr. (November 7, 1945-?) is a disbarred lawyer, former city councilor, and former state senator in Maryland. He is from a prominent family.

He studied at Baltimore City College, Lincoln University (B.A. 1967), and University of Maryland School of Law (J.D. 1970).

He served on Baltimore's city council from 1975 to 1987. He was a member of the Maryland Senate during 1987-1988. He was a member of the NAACP.

His son Michael Mitchell Jr. also became a lawyer. Both father and son were disbarred and Michael Mitchell Sr. and Clarence B. Mitchell III were convicted in relation to the Wedtech scandal.

He discussed on video the desegregation of Gwynn Oak Park.
