= Charles Coudert Nast =

American lawyer and army officer (1903 - 1981)

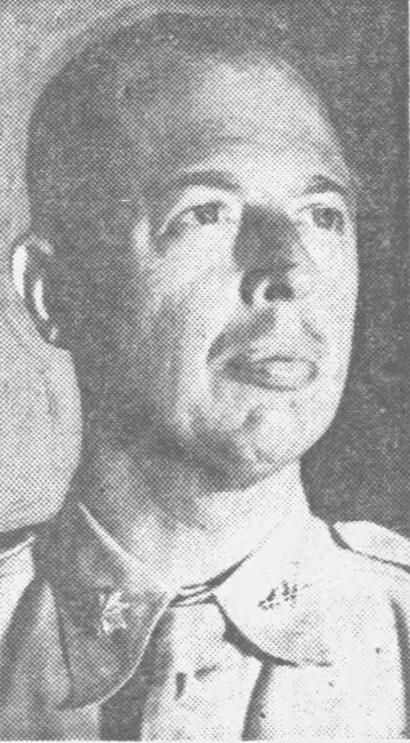
- The Honolulu Advertiser, September 30, 1945
- Born: July 23, 1903; Tuxedo Park, New York, U.S.
- Died: January 9, 1981 (aged 77); Manhattan, New York, U.S.
- Burial place: Arlington National Cemetery
- Education: Harvard College; Columbia Law School
- Spouse(s): Charlotte Babcock Brown (m. 1928–1933) Juliet Louise Houser (m. 1937–1981)
- Children: 1
- Relatives: Condé Nast (father)
- Military career
- Service: United States Army; Organized Reserve Corps; Massachusetts Army National Guard; New York Army National Guard
- Service years: 1923–1963
- Rank: Major General
- Service number: O298840
- Units: U.S. Army Coast Artillery Corps; U.S. Army Field Artillery Branch; U.S. Army Infantry Branch; U.S. Army Judge Advocate General's Corps
- Commands: 42nd Infantry Division
- Wars: World War II; Occupation of Japan
- Awards: Bronze Star Medal (2); New York Conspicuous Service Cross
- Other work: Attorney

Charles Coudert Nast (July 23, 1903 – January 9, 1981) was an American attorney and military officer from New York. A longtime member of the New York Army National Guard, He was a veteran of World War II and the Occupation of Japan, and was a recipient of the Bronze Star Medal with oak leaf cluster and the New York Conspicuous Service Cross.

A native of Tuxedo Park, New York and the son of Condé Nast, Charles C. Nast graduated from the Middlesex School, and received a Bachelor of Arts degree from Harvard College in 1925 and an LL.B. from Columbia Law School in 1927. After serving in the office of the Attorney General of New York, Nast practiced corporate law as a partner with the firm of DeWitt, Nast, Diskin & Martini, in addition to serving as general counsel of Condé Nast publications.

In 1925, Nast enlisted in the Massachusetts Army National Guard, and he later transferred his military membership to New York. He received his officer's commission in 1932, and was a captain at the start of World War II. Nast served in the Pacific theater with the 27th Infantry Division. Nast took part in the post-war Occupation of Japan, the rejoined the New York Army National Guard. In December 1950, he was promoted to brigadier general and assigned as assistant division commander of the 42nd Infantry Division. He was assigned as the division commander in 1957 and promoted to major general in 1959. He remained in command until ending his active military service in 1963, and he retired in 1967.

Nast died in Manhattan on January 9, 1981. He was buried at Arlington National Cemetery.

== Early life and civilian career ==
Charles Coudert Nast (Note: Nast usually used his middle name, and it appears in records as Charles Coudert Nast, Coudert Nast, C. Coudert Nast, Charles C. Nast, and C. C. Nast.) was born in Tuxedo Park, New York, on July 23, 1903, the son of Condé Nast and Jeanne Clarisse (Coudert) Nast. Frederic René Coudert Sr. was his mother's uncle, and several Coudert family members were involved with the prominent Coudert Brothers law firm. He graduated from the Middlesex School, then attended Harvard College, from which he received his Bachelor of Arts degree in 1925. While in college, Nast was active on the staff of The Harvard Crimson and the Harvard Graduates' Magazine. He was also a member of the Hasty Pudding Club, the college's Republican Club, and its Middlesex Club.

After college, Nast attended Columbia Law School, from which he received his LL.B. degree in 1927. He was admitted to the bar in January 1928 and accepted a position as a deputy in the office of the Attorney General of New York.

Nast practiced corporate law with the firm of DeWitt, Nast, Diskin & Martini. In addition, he was general counsel for Condé Nast publications. Nast retired in 1977.

== Military career ==
=== Start of career ===
In October 1923, Nast joined a Coast Artillery unit of the Massachusetts National Guard as a private. He served until September 1925, when he became an inactive National Guard member, and he was discharged in November. In December 1927, he joined Company K, 107th Infantry Regiment, a unit of the New York National Guard. He served until November 1928, when he was again discharged.

Nast returned to service with Company K in April 1929. He was promoted to corporal in May 1930, and was discharged in June 1931. He rejoined Company K a month later, and was promoted to sergeant in December. In May 1932, he received his commission as a second lieutenant and was assigned to the regimental headquarters of the 107th Infantry. He was promoted to captain in May 1936, but accepted reduction to first lieutenant in April 1937, when he became an inactive National Guard member. Nast was discharged in April 1939.

=== World War II ===
In September 1940, Nast returned to military duty as a private, and was assigned to the headquarters of 2nd Battalion, 105th Field Artillery, a unit of the 27th Infantry Division. He was commissioned as a captain in October, and the division entered active duty for training in anticipation of U.S. entry into World War II. He served with the 105th Field Artillery in the Pacific theater, and received promotion to major in June 1942 and lieutenant colonel in April 1943. During his time with the 27th Division, Nast participated in the Battle of Saipan and Battle of Okinawa.

Following the Surrender of Japan in August 1945, the U.S. military began the post-war Occupation of Japan. Nast, by now serving as Judge Advocate General on the 27th Division's staff, was assigned to lead the division's advance party, which arrived in Japan ahead of the division's main body to make arrangements including travel, food, and lodging. Nast transferred to the Organized Reserve Corps in January 1946, and was promoted to colonel in August.

=== Later career ===
In April 1947, Nast returned to the National Guard and joined the 42nd Infantry Division as the organization's Judge Advocate General with the rank of lieutenant colonel. In October 1949, he was again promoted to colonel. In December 1950, he was promoted to brigadier general and assigned as the 42nd Division's assistant division commander. In 1952, Nast graduated from the Infantry Officer Advanced Course.

In March 1957, Nast was assigned as commander of the 42nd Infantry Division, and he was promoted to major general in June 1959. He remained in command until October 1963, when he ended his active military service. Also in 1959, Nast graduated from the Special Associate Course (Advanced) of the United States Army Command and General Staff College. He remained on New York's inactive National Guard list until July 1967, when he retired. Nast's awards included the Bronze Star Medal with oak leaf cluster and the New York Conspicuous Service Cross.

Nast died in Manhattan on January 9, 1981. He was buried at Arlington National Cemetery.
