= Conspicuous Service Medal (New York) =

New York State Conspicuous Service Medal
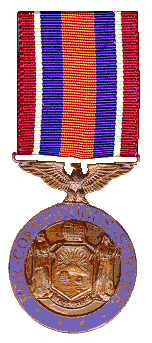
- Type: Medal
- Country: United States of America
- Presented by: (New York (state)) New York National Guard
- Status: Currently awarded
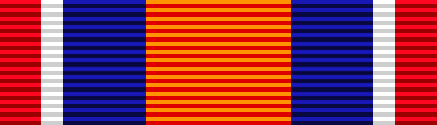
- New York Conspicuous Service Medal

Precedence
- Next (higher): New York Medal for Valor Medal
- Next (lower): New York Medal for Meritorious Service

The New York Conspicuous Service Medal is an award of the State of New York given to the New York State Organized Militia. The New York Conspicuous Service Medal is the 2nd highest New York State National Guard military award, after the Medal of Valor. It is awarded to any individual who shall have distinguished themselves by exceptionally meritorious service in a capacity of great responsibility.

For each successive award, a silver medal device (shield) will be attached to the suspension ribbon and the service ribbon.

== See also ==
- Conspicuous Service Cross (New York)
