= Bénaménil =

- Commune
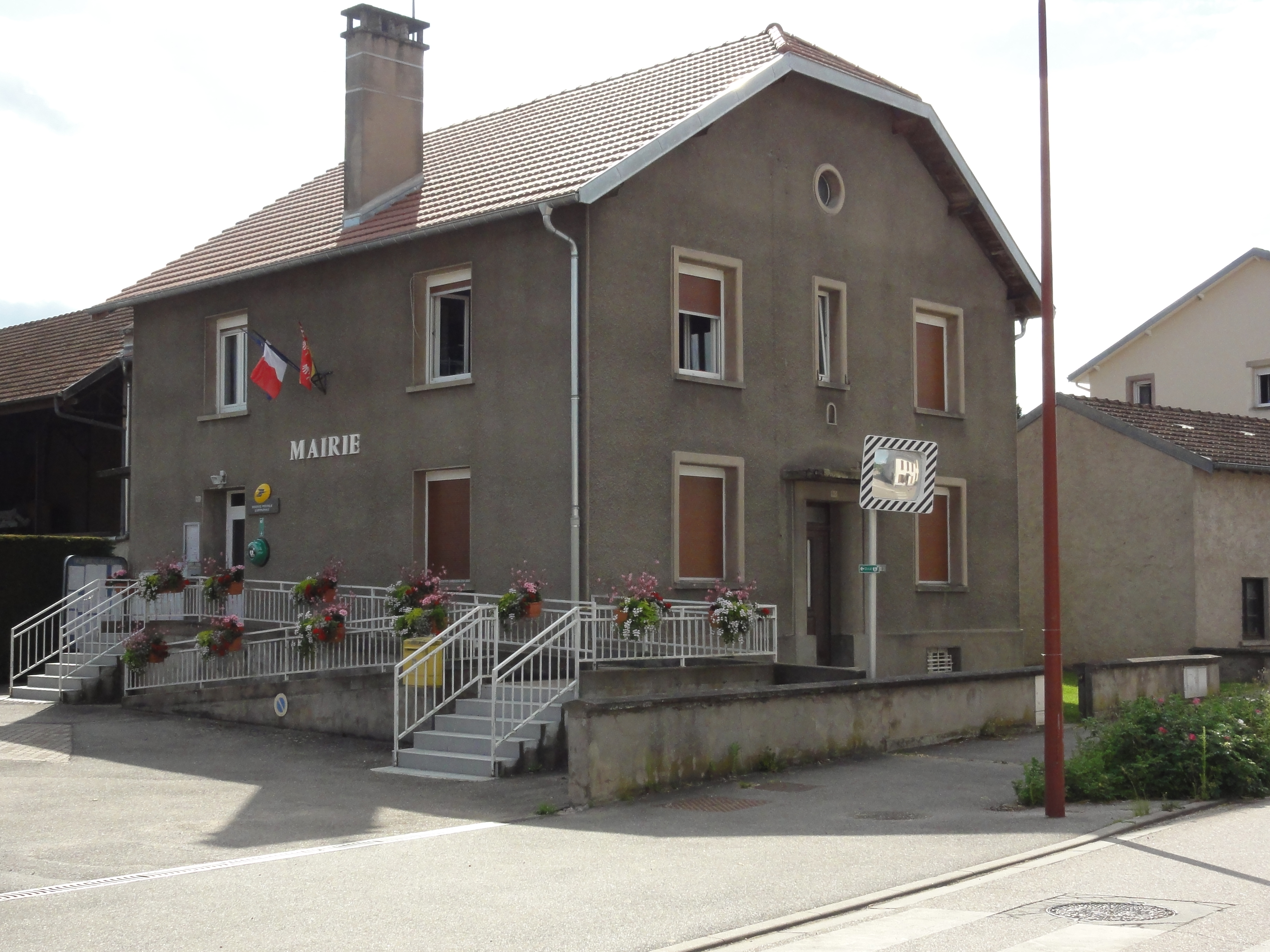
- The town hall in Bénaménil

- Coat of arms
- Location of Bénaménil
- Location within France Location within Grand Est
- Coordinates: 48°34′15″N 6°40′27″E
- Country: France
- Region: Grand Est
- Department: Meurthe-et-Moselle
- Arrondissement: Lunéville
- Canton: Baccarat
- Intercommunality: Territoire de Lunéville à Baccarat

Government
  - Mayor (2020–2026): Bruno Minutiello
- Area^{1}: 9.38 km^{2} (3.62 sq mi)
- Elevation: 234 m (768 ft)
- Highest elevation: 313 m (1,027 ft)
- Lowest elevation: 232 m (761 ft)
- Population (2023): 592
  - Density: 63.1/km^{2} (163/sq mi)
- Time zone: UTC+01:00 (CET)
  - Summer (DST): UTC+02:00 (CEST)
- INSEE/Postal code: 54061 /54450
- ^{1} French Land Register data, which excludes lakes, ponds, glaciers > 1 km^{2} (0.386 sq mi or 247 acres) and river estuaries.

Bénaménil (French pronunciation: [benamenil]) is a commune in the Meurthe-et-Moselle department in northeastern France.

== Population ==
Historical population
Year	Pop.	±% p.a.
1968	382	—
1975	397	+0.55%
1982	438	+1.41%
1990	527	+2.34%
1999	498	−0.63%
2007	533	+0.85%
2012	558	+0.92%
2017	583	+0.88%
2023	592	+0.26%
Source: INSEE

== See also ==
- Communes of the Meurthe-et-Moselle department
