= Conspicuous Service Cross (New York) =

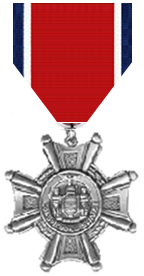
- Country: United States of America
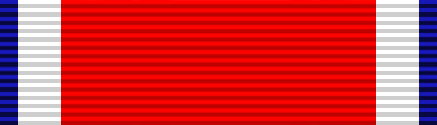
- Service ribbon

Precedence
- Next (higher): Defense of Liberty Medal
- Next (lower): New York Medal for Merit

The Conspicuous Service Cross is a decoration for military service awarded by the State of New York.

== Eligibility ==
The general criteria for the New York State Conspicuous Service Cross require an individual to meet all four conditions:

  - A current New York State citizen OR
  - A New York State citizen while serving on federal active duty
1. A current or former full-time military person serving in the Armed Forces of the United States for purposes other than training since 1917; Active Guard/Reserve AGR excepted
  - Currently serving under honorable conditions OR
  - Honorably discharged from active duty
2. A recipient of at least one of the following decorations:
  - Medal of Honor
  - Distinguished Service Cross
  - Navy Cross
  - Air Force Cross
  - Defense Distinguished Service Medal
  - Distinguished Service Medal (U.S. Army)
  - Distinguished Service Medal (Navy-Marine Corps)
  - Distinguished Service Medal (Air Force)
  - Distinguished Service Medal (Coast Guard)
  - Silver Star
  - Defense Superior Service Medal
  - Legion of Merit
  - Distinguished Flying Cross
  - Soldier's Medal
  - Navy and Marine Corps Medal
  - Airman's Medal
  - Coast Guard Medal
  - Bronze Star Medal
  - Purple Heart
  - Defense Meritorious Service Medal
  - Meritorious Service Medal
  - Air Medal

The Conspicuous Service Cross is also awarded to those members of the New York Organised Militia who were prisoners of war, served at Pearl Harbor on December 7, 1941, directly participated in the Invasion of Normandy on June 6, 1944, or have been declared by the Department of Defense as killed or missing in action. It may also be awarded for conspicuous service to the State of New York.

== See also ==
- Conspicuous Service Medal (New York)
