= 108th Infantry Regiment (United States) =

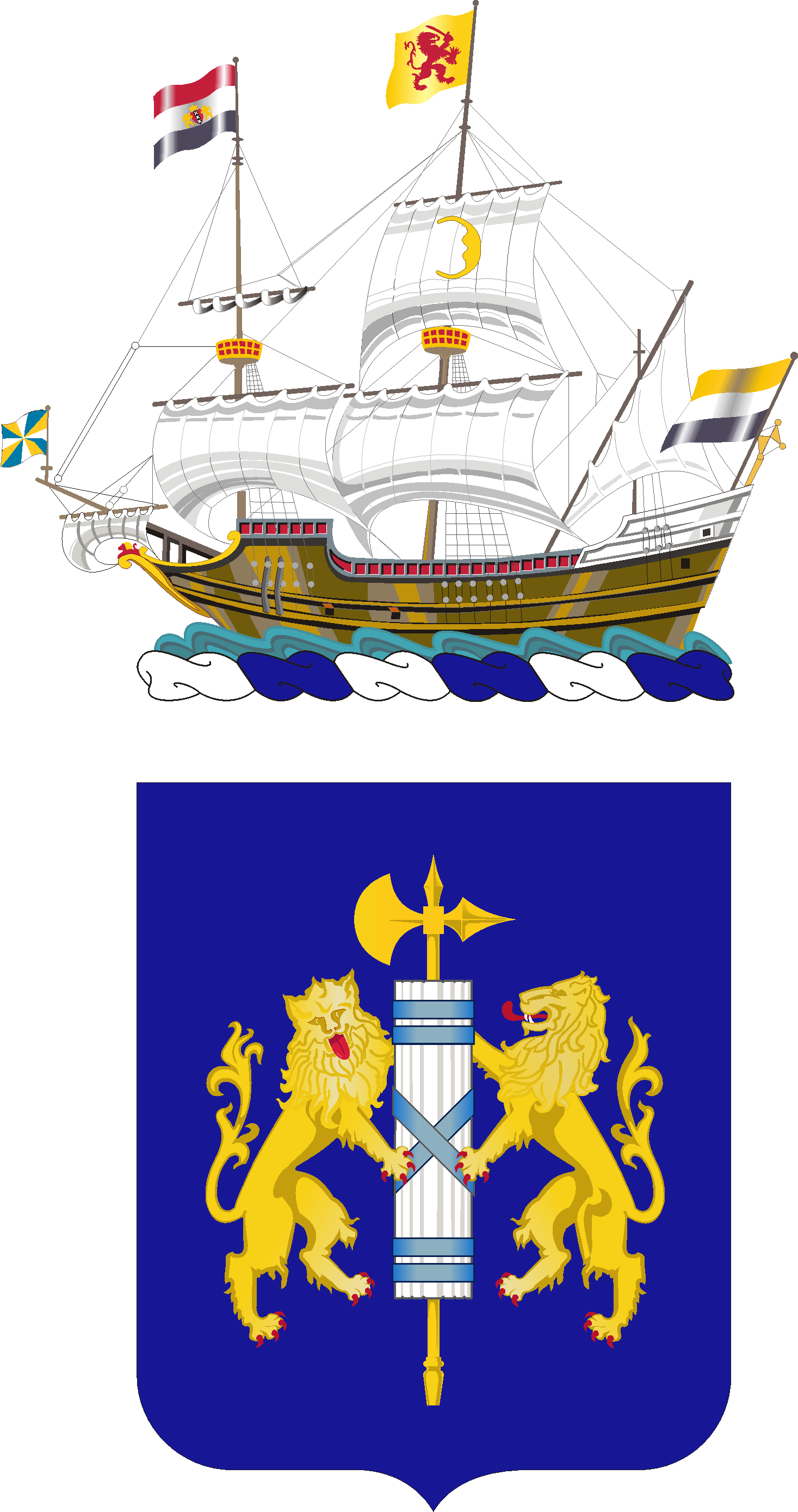
- Coat of arms
- Active: 1898; 1907–present
- Country: United States
- Branch: United States Army
- Size: Regiment
- Nickname: Third New York
- Mottos: "Virtue non-Verbis"; By Valor Not Words
- Engagements: Spanish–American War; Mexican Border Conflict; World War I World War II; Iraq War; War in Afghanistan

Insignia
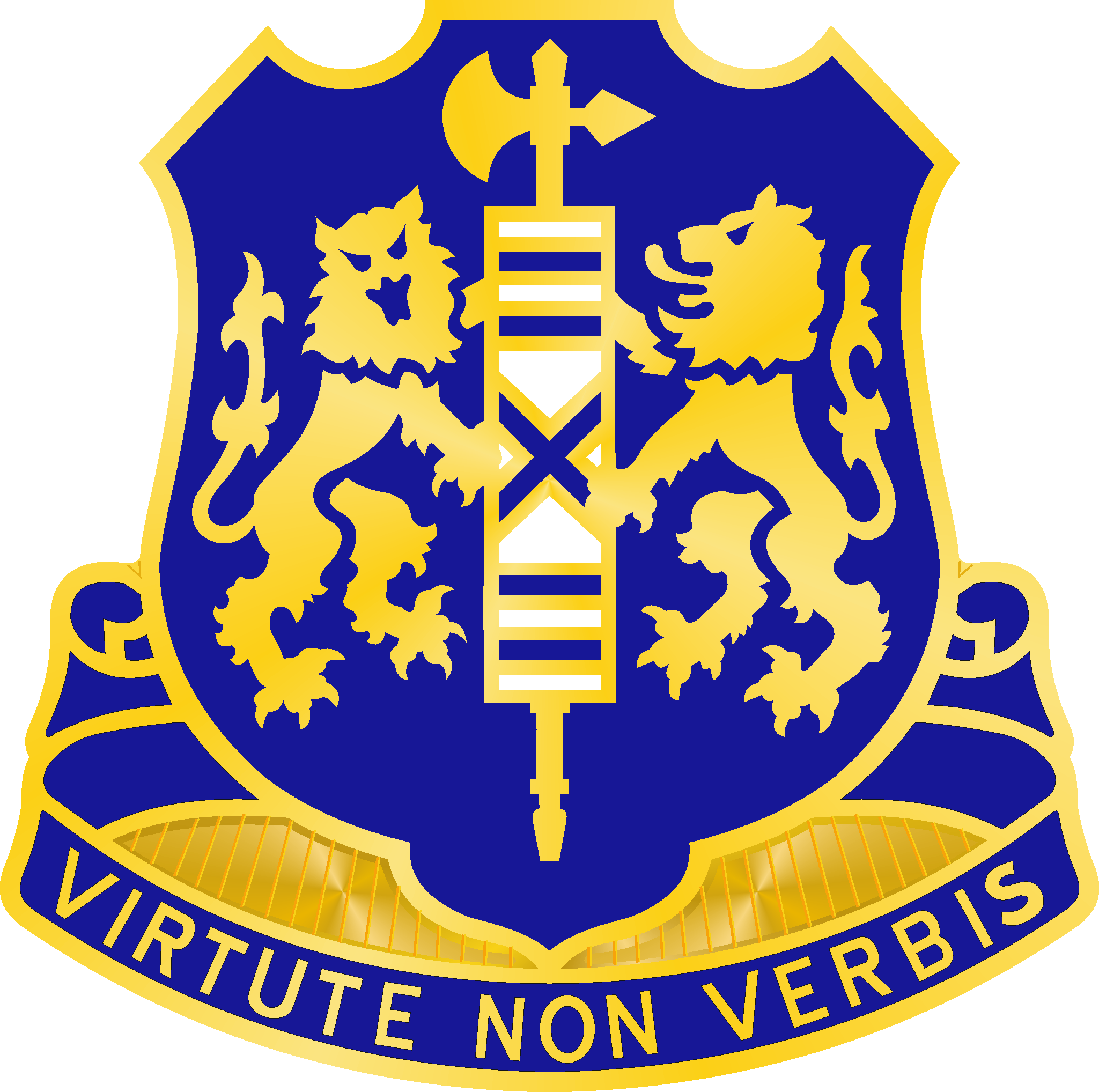
- DUI

The 108th Infantry Regiment is a regiment of the New York Army National Guard. It was first formed in 1898 and has been in continuous existence since 1907. As National Guardsmen, Soldiers of the 108th Infantry can be called upon to serve the state and federal governments. The 108th has served in the Spanish–American War, the Mexican Border War, World War I, World War II, Iraq, and Afghanistan.

== Spanish–American War ==
The 108th Infantry Regiment was originally called the 3rd New York Volunteer Infantry. When the Spanish–American War broke out in April 1898, a new regiment was organized from twelve separate National Guard companies from the 4th Brigade. (Regiments called the 3rd New York and 108th New York Infantry had both served in the Civil War; these were different units with no connection to the later 108th.) The 3rd New York, headquartered in Rochester, mustered into service on 17 May 1898. They were involved in drilling, provost, and camp duty in Virginia and Pennsylvania. The brief war with Spain ended before the regiment could be sent into action, and the Guardsmen were mustered out of federal service by companies between 30 November and 10 December 1898. Thirty-three members of the 3rd New York died of disease during its short service, with several more dying afterward of typhoid fever contracted while on active duty. The state historian called the 3rd New York Regiment "unquestionably one of the best that New York sent into the service," noting that not a single member had to be disciplined in its first three months of duty.

=== Composition of 3rd NY Volunteer Infantry ===
As of 2 May 1898

Headquarters – Rochester

1st Battalion

- Co. L (formerly 30th Separate Co.): Elmira
- Co. I (43rd): Olean
- Co. K (47th): Hornellsville
- Co. D (48th): Oswego

2nd Battalion

- Co. M (2nd): Auburn
- Co. A (8th): Rochester
- Co. B (34th): Cortlandt Manor
- Co. C (41st): Syracuse

3rd Battalion

- Co. H (1st): Rochester
- Co. G (25th): Tonawanda
- Co. F (29th): Medina
- Co. E (42nd): Niagara Falls

== Early 20th century ==
After the war the 3rd New York was dissolved and the companies returned to the peacetime National Guard duties of drilling and supporting the state and local authorities. The companies were reorganized as the 1st, 2nd, and 3rd Infantry Battalions on 22 December 1898, and were consolidated into the 3rd Infantry on 30 March 1907. In April 1913 the 3rd served in Buffalo during rioting caused by a streetcar workers' strike. It was also deployed for guard duty at Pharr, Texas on the Mexican border in 1916 during the U.S. Army's expedition against the guerrilla commander Pancho Villa.

== World War I ==
On October 1, 1917, nearly six months after the American entry into World War I, as New York National Guardsmen trained at Camp Wadsworth, South Carolina, the 108th Infantry Regiment was formed pursuant to a general order. By the same order, 1,350 men were transferred in from the 74th New York Infantry (Buffalo) and 293 men from the 12th New York Infantry (New York City). In November 1917 the regiment was organized into the 54th Infantry Brigade as part of the 27th Division, commanded by Major General John F. O'Ryan. By 31 May 1918 the whole regiment had arrived in France. The 27th Division (minus the division's artillery) was attached to British forces for training and issued British rifles and machine guns. Members of the 108th Infantry received training on a variety of military subjects and enjoyed friendly relations with their instructors, the Training Cadre of the 6th Battalion, Lancashire Fusiliers, 66th Division. The 27th Division ended up fighting alongside the British and Australians for its entire combat service. The Regimental Scout Officer of the 108th noted that "we were supposed to leave behind the customs and traditions of the U.S. Army, in which we had been so carefully brought up, in order that we might study and adapt ourselves to those of our Allies, the British, with whom our lot had been cast for the duration of the war." This included living on the British Tommy's relatively scanty rations.

The 27th Division initially served in the trenches around Ypres alongside the British from July to September 1918. In September, the New Yorkers joined the British Fourth Army in the infamous Somme region, facing the Germans' formidable Hindenburg Line. Ordered to advance on 27 September, the 27th Division was unable to hold its gains. Several members of the 108th Infantry Regiment were awarded the Distinguished Service Cross for their actions in the area of Ronssoy on 28–29 September: Private Daniel Moskowitz, Co. F, Private Morris Silverberg, Co. G, Private (First Class) Edward P. Pierce, Co. D, Corporal James Paul Clark, Co. F, and Sgt. Martin M. Smith, Co. G. The 54th Brigade attacked as part of the Hundred Days Offensive on 29 September. German artillery, poison gas, and machine guns took a heavy toll as the Americans struggled through barbed wire and shell holes to reach the Hindenburg Line. The 108th penetrated the German defenses at Quennemont Farm, although they were stalled by severe casualties and an enemy counterattack, and Australian units were sent in to complete the assault. Many leaderless Americans joined in the Australian attack without orders. This engagement is officially called the Battle of St. Quentin Canal. Private First Class Frank Gaffney of Company G later received a Medal of Honor for his heroism. The 108th joined in the pursuit of the retreating Germans, engaging them at Jonc de Mer Ridge, the Selle River, and Catillon. The 500 survivors still on duty were pulled out of the line to rest on 21 October, three weeks before the Armistice with Germany ended the fighting.

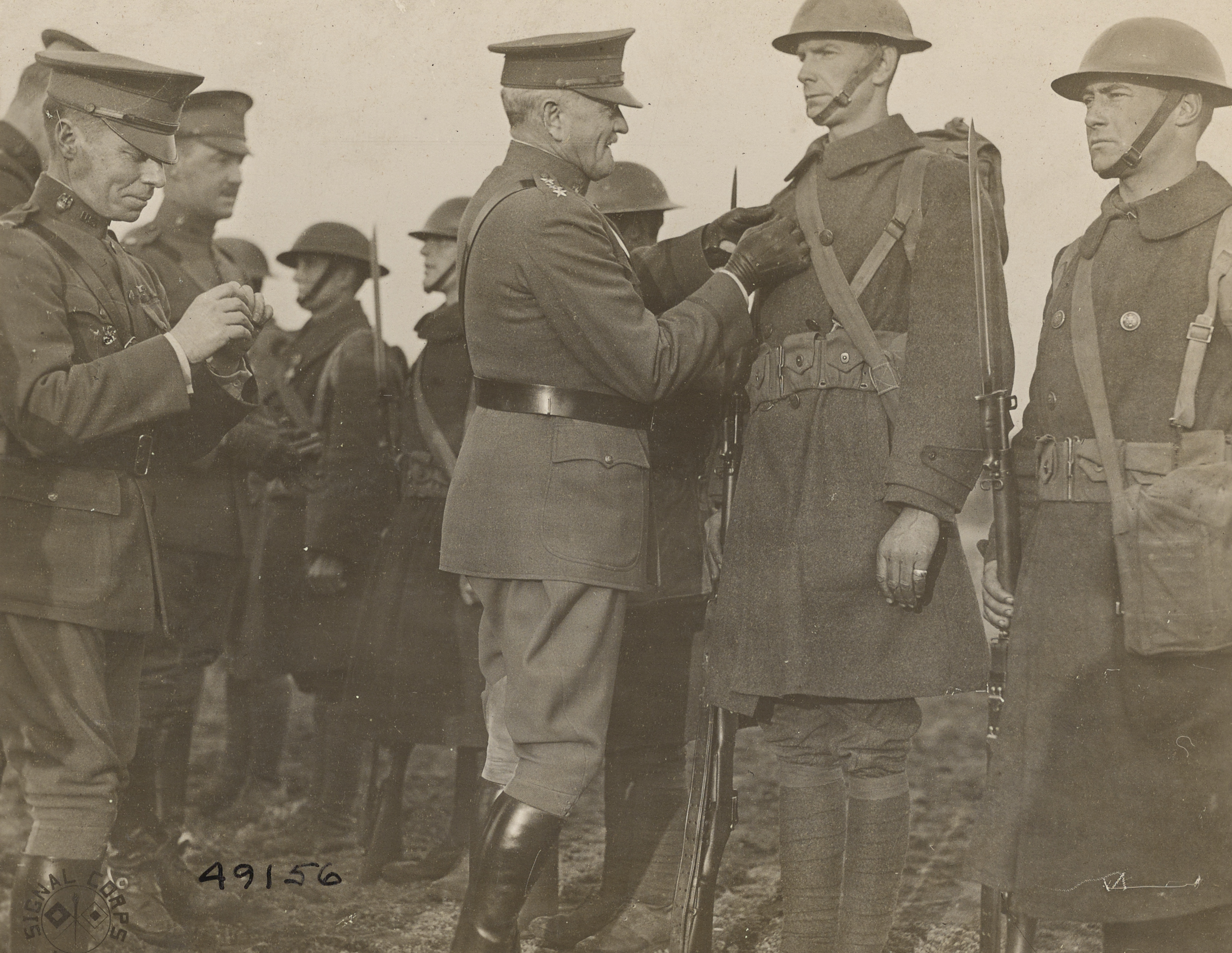
General John J. Pershing, Commander-in-Chief (C-in-C) of the American Expeditionary Forces (AEF), decorates Corporal Patrick Synott of Company F, 108th Infantry Regiment, 27th Division, at Bonnétable, Sarthe, France, January 22, 1919.

The 108th Infantry suffered 1,763 casualties—including 331 dead—in three months of combat out of 3,056 men in the ranks. Most of these casualties occurred in the Hindenburg Line attack. Reasons for the heavy losses included a lack of experienced leadership and the eagerness of the doughboys, who often made frontal assaults on enemy machine gun nests. Additionally, Allied artillery did not "soften up" the Germans with a preparatory bombardment before the attack, for fear of hitting Americans lying wounded from an earlier assault. Nevertheless, as the 27th Division commander Major General O'Ryan remarked: "That the 108th Infantry ... should have broken through the maze of wire that existed and in the face of machine guns firing from every trench and nest, lodged one battalion in the main position, now seems an extraordinary feat."

== Interwar period ==
On 6 March 1919 the 108th Infantry returned to New York aboard the RMS Mauretania and was mustered out of federal service at Camp Upton. On 24 April 1920, the 108th once again became the 3rd New York Infantry, having been reorganizing since the previous August. Under the National Defense Act of 1920, the 108th Infantry was reconstituted in the National Guard on 30 December 1920, assigned to the 27th Division, and allotted to the state of New York, and the 3rd Infantry was redesignated the 108th Infantry for a second time on 1 June 1921. In 1925, the 108th adopted a distinctive unit insignia featuring a fasces held by two lions. Elements of the regiment were called up to perform flood relief work near Binghamton, New York, from 18–20 March 1936. The regiment conducted annual summer training most years at Camp Smith, near Peekskill, New York, from 1921–38. It was inducted into active federal service at Syracuse, New York, on 15 October 1940, and moved to Fort McClellan, Alabama, where it arrived 26 October 1940.

== World War II ==
=== Composition in 1940 ===
- Headquarters: Syracuse
- Headquarters Company: Syracuse
- Antitank Company: Rochester
- Service Company: Auburn
  - Band Section: Syracuse
- Medical Detachment: Syracuse
- Headquarters, 1st Battalion: Syracuse
- Headquarters Detachment, 1st Battalion: Syracuse
  - Co. A: Watertown
  - Co. B: Geneva
  - Co. C: Syracuse
  - Co. D: Oswego
- Headquarters, 2nd Battalion: Rochester
- Headquarters Detachment, 2nd Battalion: Rochester
  - Cos. E, G, and H: Rochester
  - Co. F: Medina
- Headquarters, 3rd Battalion: Auburn
- Headquarters Detachment, 3rd Battalion: Auburn
  - Co. I: Auburn
  - Co. K: Hornell
  - Co. L: Elmira
  - Co. M: Ogdensburg

The 27th Division became part of the garrison of Hawaii in April 1942. It was here that the 108th parted ways with the New York Division. An Army-wide reorganization cut divisions from four regiments to three, and the 108th Infantry was transferred to the 40th Infantry Division (California National Guard) on 1 September 1942. The 40th Division remained on Hawaii for fourteen more months.

In January 1944 the division landed on the South Pacific island of Guadalcanal, which had been largely secured by U.S. forces a year earlier. That April they moved to Cape Gloucester on New Britain, with the 108th being stationed at Arawe in the south. This was a more active area where the regiments of the 40th conducted combat patrols, since there were still many Japanese troops on the island. As they did on Guadalcanal, however, the men of the 108th found that their most dangerous enemy on Cape Gloucester was not the Japanese Army but the harsh jungle climate.

On 28 November the 40th Infantry Division was concentrated at Borgen Bay to prepare for the invasion of Luzon, the largest and most strategically important of the Philippine Islands. The 108th Regimental Combat Team—composed of the 108th Infantry Regiment, the 164th Field Artillery Battalion, Co. C of the 115th Engineer Combat Battalion, and Co. C of the 115th Medical Battalion—was in reserve on S-Day—9 January 1945, when the Sixth Army landed at Lingayen Gulf. Japanese resistance intensified as the GIs moved south toward Manila, and the 108th fought brutal battles for possession of Fort Stotsenburg, Clark Field, Top of the World, Hill 7, and Sacobia Ridge. The 43rd Infantry Division relieved the 40th on 2 March. Six days later the 108th was detached and sent to the island of Leyte to assist in mopping up defeated Japanese forces. The regiment's 2nd Battalion also cleared Masbate and other local islands. On Leyte and Masbate the 108th lost an estimated 19 troops killed and 49 wounded.

On 10 May—code-named Q-Day—the 108th joined in the battle for Mindanao. The regiment made an unopposed landing at Macajalar Bay near Bugo and moved south to clear the Sayre Highway with the assistance of Filipino guerrillas. From 13–18 May the 108th fought tenacious Japanese defenders at the Mangima River canyon, which became known as Purple Heart Canyon. The regiment linked up with the 31st Infantry Division coming up from the south on 23 May. Securing the Sayre Highway cost the 108th about 15 men killed and 100 wounded. (Non-combat casualties from battle fatigue, sickness, and heat exhaustion were probably heavier.) The troops then moved east to combat more Japanese resistance. After six weeks of enduring thick jungle, heavy rains, knee-deep mud, and tall, razor-sharp grass—not to mention Japanese resistance—the 108th rejoined the 40th Division on Panay. The 108th RCT lost 45 members killed and 148 wounded in northern Mindanao.

With the war against Japan nearly over, the 108th Infantry was sent to garrison Korea on 29 June. Their homeward journey began on 15 March 1946, when they left Korea bound for San Francisco. The regiment arrived on 5 April and was deactivated two days later at Camp Stoneman. The National Guardsmen of the 108th Infantry had been some of the first U.S. troops to deploy after Pearl Harbor, and the 108th was one of the last Guard units to return to the continental United States. Its long, grueling service in the Pacific Theater earned the 108th Infantry four campaign streamers and the Philippine Presidential Unit Citation. During the war, the 108th reportedly lost 191 men killed in action. 59 were awarded the Silver Star.

== Recent history ==
Only the 2nd Battalion of the 108th Infantry is still in existence. In recent years it has served in Iraq and Afghanistan. On 1 May 2004, while providing security for a pipeline repair crew west of Balad, Iraq, soldiers of the battalion helped to rescue American truck driver Thomas Hamill, who had been held captive by insurgents since 9 April. The battalion played an instrumental role in the Battle of Samarra in October 2004. In 2008, elements of the battalion deployed to Afghanistan with the 27th Infantry Brigade Combat Team. In 2012 the unit deployed as a separate battalion assigned to RC West in Afghanistan.

2nd Battalion, 108th Infantry, headquartered in Utica, is part of the 27th Infantry Brigade Combat Team and has companies and detachments stationed in eight Upstate New York towns.

== Distinctive unit insignia ==
- Description

A Gold color metal and enamel device 1 1/8 inches (2.9 cm) in height overall consisting of a shield blazoned: Azure, a fasces in pale, the rods Argent banded of the first, the axe Or, supported by two lions the dexter rampant guardant, the sinister rampant, both of the last. Attached below and to the sides of the shield a Blue scroll inscribed "VIRTUTE NON VERBIS" in Gold letters.

- Symbolism

The shield is Infantry blue; in the center the fasces representing France and on either side and supporting it the lions of Great Britain and Belgium in gold. The motto translates to "By Valor, Not By Words."

- Background

The distinctive unit insignia was originally approved for the 108th Infantry Regiment on 29 April 1925. It was amended to delete the motto on 1 October 1925. It was redesignated for the 108th Armored Infantry Battalion and amended to add the motto on 22 March 1957. The insignia was redesignated for the 108th Infantry Regiment on 19 March 1962.

== Coat of arms ==
=== Blazon ===
- Shield

Azure, a fasces in pale, the rods Argent banded of the first, the axe Or, supported by two lions the dexter rampant guardant, the sinister rampant, both of the last, armed and langued Gules.

- Crest

That for the regiments and separate battalions of the New York Army National Guard: On a wreath Argent and Azure, the full-rigged ship "Half Moon," all Proper. Motto: "Virtue Non Verbis" (By Valor, Not By Words).

=== Symbolism ===
- Shield

The shield is Infantry blue; in the center the fasces representing France and on either side and supporting it the lions of Great Britain and Belgium in gold.

- Crest

The crest is that of the New York Army National Guard.

=== Background ===
The coat of arms was originally approved for the 108th Infantry Regiment on 30 June 1924. It was amended to correct and clarify the blazon of the shield on 1 October 1925. It was redesignated for the 108th Armored Infantry Battalion on 22 March 1957. The insignia was redesignated for the 108th Infantry Regiment and amended to correct the blazon of the crest to restore the colors of the wreath on 19 March 1962.

== In popular culture ==
The male protagonist of the 2015 video game Fallout 4 served in the 2nd Battalion of the 108th Infantry Regiment.

== Bibliography ==
- 40th Infantry Division. Reprint. Nashville: The Battery Press, 1995.
- "108th Infantry Regiment World War One." (Accessed 20 June 2011.)
- "108th Infantry Regiment World War Two." (Accessed 20 June 2011.)
- Annual Report of the Adjutant General of the State of New York for the Year of 1899. Albany: James B. Lyon, 1900.
- New York in the Spanish–American War 1898: Part of the Report of the Adjutant General of the State for 1900. 3 vols. Albany: James B. Lyon, 1900.
- Astor, Gerald. Crisis in the Pacific: The Battles for the Philippine Islands by the Men who Fought Them. Reprint. New York: Dell Publishing, 2002.
- Berry, Henry. Make the Kaiser Dance. Garden City, NY: Doubleday, 1978.
- A Brief History and Illustrated Roster of the 108th Infantry, United States Army. Philadelphia: Edward Stern and Co., 1918.
- Burdick, Henry Hagaman, ed. New York Division National Guard: War Record by the Officers and Men of the Division. New York: *Burdick and King, 1917.
- Cannon, M. Hamlin. Leyte: The Return to the Philippines. Washington: Office of the Chief of Military History, Department of the Army, 1954.
- Delk, James D. The Fighting Fortieth in War and Peace. Palm Springs, CA: ETC Publications, 1998.
- Eichelberger, Robert L. Dear Miss Em: General Eichelberger's War in the Pacific, 1942–1945. Edited by Jay Luvaas. Westport, Connecticut: Greenwood Press, 1972.
- Eichelberger, Robert L. Our Jungle Road to Tokyo. New York: Viking Press, 1950.
- Fitzgerald, John. Family in Crisis: The United States, the Philippines, and the Second World War. Bloomington: 1st Books, 2002.
- Howard, William F. "New York's Citizen Soldiers." New York Archives 3, no. 3 (Winter 2004): 8–12.
- Hurdle, Judy Lemons. George R. Lemons 1920-1945: How He Spent His Dash. 2016.
- Kaune, Charles S. "The National Guard in War: An Historical Analysis of the 27th Infantry Division (New York National Guard) in *World War II." Master's diss., U.S. Army Command and General Staff College, 1990. Reproduced here. (Accessed 20 June 2011.)
- Love, Edmund G. The 27th Infantry Division in World War II. Nashville: Battery Press, 1982.
- MacArthur, Douglas. Reports of General MacArthur. 2 vols in 4. Washington: U. S. Government Printing Office, 1966.
- MacVeagh, Lucien Cameron, and Lee D. Brown. The Yankee in the British Zone. New York: G. P. Putnam's Sons, 1920.
- Mitchinson, K. W. Battleground Europe: Epehy. London: Leo Cooper, 1998.
- New York and the War with Spain: History of the Empire State Regiments. Albany: Argus Company, 1903.
- "New York Units at the Mexican Border, 1916–1917." Accessed 20 June 2011.
- Oakleaf, J. F. Notes on the Operations of the 108th Infantry Overseas. Olean, NY: Olean Times Publishing Company, 1921. Reproduced here.(Accessed 20 June 2011.)
- O'Ryan, John F. The Story of the 27th Division. 2 vols. Albany: Wynkoop Hallenbeck Crawford, 1921.
- A Short History and Illustrated Roster of the 108th Infantry United States Army. Philadelphia: Edward Stern and Co., 1918.
- Smith, Robert Ross. United States Army in World War II: The War in the Pacific: Triumph in the Philippines. Washington: Government Printing Office, 1963.
- Stanton, Shelby. Stanton, Shelby L. World War II Order of Battle: An Encyclopedic Reference to U.S. Army Ground Forces from Battalion through Division, 1939–1945. Rev. edition. Mechanicsburg, PA: Stackpole Books, 2006.
- Sweeney, Daniel J. History of Buffalo and Erie County 1914–1919. 2nd Edition. Buffalo: Committee of One Hundred Under Authority of the City of Buffalo, 1920.
- Swetland, Maurice J., and Lilli Swetland. These Men: "For Conspicuous Bravery Above and Beyond the Call of Duty ..." Harrisburg, PA: Telegraph Press, 1940.
- "The WW1 Diary of A. W. Miller." (Accessed 20 June 2011.)
- Wright, Dr. Donald P., and Colonel Timothy R. Reese. On Point II: Transition to the New Campaign: The United States Army in Operation Iraqi Freedom May 2003 – January 2005. Ft. Leavenworth, KS: Combined Studies Institute Press, 2008.
- Yockelson, Mitchell A. Borrowed Soldiers: Americans Under British Command, 1918. Norman: University of Oklahoma Press, 2008.
