= Carneal (disambiguation) =

Carneal, Herb Carneal (1923–2007), was an American sports announcer.

Carneal may also refer to:

== People ==
- Russell M. Carneal (1918–1998), American legislator and judge
- William T. Carneal (1920–1944), U.S. Army soldier killed in World War II
- Michael Carneal (born 1983), perpetrator of the 1997 Heath High School shooting

== Places ==
- Carneal House, historic residence in Covington, Kentucky
