= 27th Infantry Division (United States) =

World War-era US Army formation

27th Infantry Division (1917–55) 27th Armored Division (1955–68)
- 27th Infantry Division shoulder sleeve insignia
- Active: 9 February 1898–4 April 1898; 23 June 1908–1 April 1919; 23 December 1921–31 December 1945; 21 April 1947–1 February 1955; 1 February 1955 became 27th Armored Division
- Country: United States
- Branch: United States Army
- Type: Infantry
- Size: Division
- Nicknames: "O'Ryan's Roughnecks" "New York Division"
- Engagements: World War I; Ypres-Lys; Somme Offensive; World War II; Central Pacific; Western Pacific; Ryukyus

Commanders
- Notable commanders: Major General John F. O'Ryan

The 27th Infantry Division was a unit of the Army National Guard in World War I and World War II. The division traces its history from the New York Division, formed originally in 1908. The 6th Division designation was changed to the 27th Division in July 1917.

== History ==
When the New York Division was organized in 1908, New York became the second state, after Pennsylvania, to structure its National Guard at such a high tactical level in peacetime. The New York Division was called to active duty during the Mexican border crisis of 1916. While on federal duty, it was redesignated as the 6th Division in June 1916. It was released from active duty in December 1916, only to be recalled for World War I service in July 1917. The 6th Division was reorganized and redesignated as the 27th Division on 1 October 1917.

=== World War I ===
In World War I the 27th Division was commanded by Major General John F. O'Ryan.

==== Formation ====
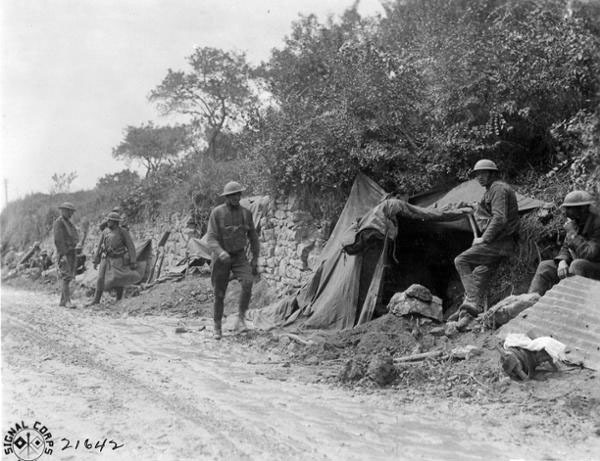
Soldiers of the 107th Infantry Regiment of the 27th Division waiting to head for the front lines and replace British troops near St. Gillis, France, August 12, 1918.

Following the declaration of war on the Central Powers by the United States, the division was called into federal service on 15 July 1917, and hastily recruited New Yorkers to increase its numbers.

The division was one of only four divisions formed during the war from National Guard units entirely from a single state; the other divisions so formed were from Illinois (the 33rd Division), Ohio (the 37th Division), and Pennsylvania (the 28th Division). However, not all New Yorkers served in the 27th. Its initial strength was 991 officers and 27,114 enlisted men. The division's initial organization of three brigades with three infantry regiments each was carried over from the 6th Division

Prior to its departing to training, the division participated in a large send-off parade in New York City along 5th Avenue on 30 August 1917. The 7th Infantry Regiment was the first to leave for training on 11 September 1917, by train. The training was conducted at a purpose-built but temporary facility at Camp Wadsworth, Spartanburg, South Carolina. Nearby hotels such as the Cleveland Hotel became centers for social life. The camp also housed seven YMCA Huts and a Knights of Columbus Hall. While African-American servicemen stationed at Camp Wadsworth associated with the 27th, they were not permitted to enter the service organization clubs on base, which were segregated, until a black soldiers' club was built in early 1918.

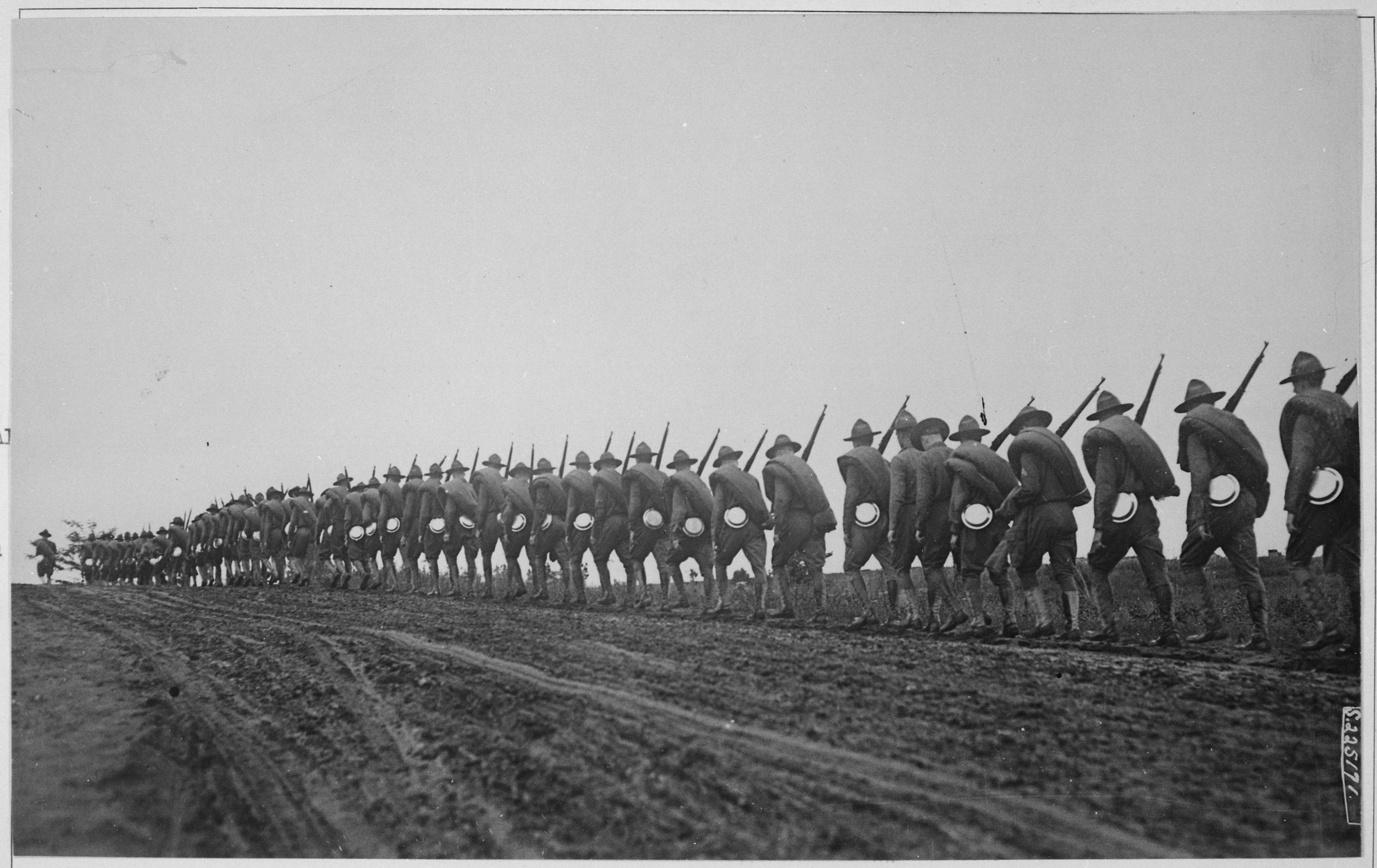
On the march

In the spring of 1918, the division began its movement toward embarkation camps, and shipped out on 20 April 1918. The division's advance detachment left Hoboken on 2 May and arrived at Brest, France, 10 May 1918. Late in June the last units of the 27th Division had arrived safely overseas.

==== Western Front ====
From the arrival of the first troops to the Western Front until 24 July, the division spent its time undertaking its final stages of training under British mentors in Picardy and Flanders. On 25 July, the 27th Division, excluding its artillery brigade and ammunition train, occupied the Dickebusch Lake and Scherpenberg sectors in Flanders.

In just over a month, this operation merged into the Ypres-Lys action, and then, from 19 August to 3 September, the 27th was on its own.

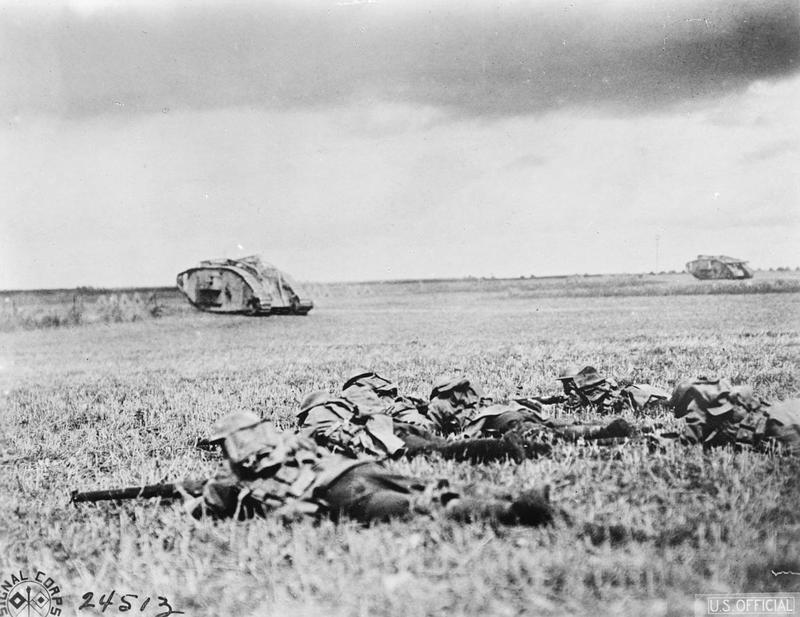
107th Infantry Regiment, 27th Division, following tanks near Beauquesnes, Somme, September 1918.

It was decided by Field Marshal Douglas Haig that the Fourth Army's Australian Corps would lead the Battle of St. Quentin Canal . However, due to the Corps depleted nature, which was a result of fighting almost continuously, it would be reinforced by the 27th and 30th divisions, which resulted in II Corps being temporarily reassigned under Australian command. This great Somme "push", which lasted from 24 September to 1 October, saw the 27th engaged in severe fighting along the Saint Quentin Canal Tunnel—one of the out-lying strong points of the Hindenburg Line. At the conclusion of the first phase of the battle, and following heavy losses, the 27th was placed into reserve for rest and recuperation. Six days later, the division was sent back into the line, moving steadily toward Busigny whilst chasing the retreating Germans. These operations were supported by Australian Artillery until 9 October, when British artillery units began supporting the division's operations. As a result of these offensives by the Australian, British and US forces, the Hindenburg's Main Line was penetrated.

The 52d Field Artillery Brigade and the 102nd Ammunition Train of the New York Division had not gone with the rest of the Twenty-seventh Division to the British front in Flanders. They had moved up on 28 October, to support the Seventy-Ninth Division in the Argonne.

Meanwhile, the Twenty-Seventh Division units which had seen heavy action in Flanders, had moved back to an area near the French seaport of Brest.

- Major Operations: Meuse-Argonne (only the artillery), Ypres-Lys, Somme Offensive.
- Initially stationed in the East Poperinghe Line.
  - Battle of Dickebusche Lake, Summer 1918
  - Battle of Vierstraat Ridge, Summer 1918
  - Struggled to break the German defensive Hindenburg Line, September 1918.
  - Second battle of the Somme, 25 September 1918
  - Selle River, November 1918

The 27th did break the Hindenburg line during the Battle of the Somme and forced a German retreat from their defensive line and forced the Germans to a final confrontation. After a final confrontation with the retreating Germans at the Selle River the Armistice ended the fighting and the division was sent home in February 1919, to be mustered out several months later. The division had sustained a total of 8,334 (KIA: 1,442; WIA: 6,892) casualties when it was inactivated in April 1919.

=== Interwar period ===
In 1921, pursuant to the National Defense Act of 1920, the division was reconstituted in the National Guard, allotted to the state of New York in the Second Corps Area, and assigned to the II Corps. The division headquarters was reorganized and federally recognized at New York City on 23 December 1921.

The 53rd Infantry Brigade initially consisted of the 105th and 106th Infantry Regiments. On 1 September 1940, the first iteration of the 106th Infantry Regiment was converted into the 186th Field Artillery Regiment and 101st Military Police Battalion. The 10th Infantry (New York), formerly part of the separate 93rd Infantry Brigade (the headquarters of which was converted into the 71st Field Artillery Brigade on 1 September 1940), was assigned to the 53rd Brigade in its place. It was later redesignated the 106th Infantry, although it was lineally unrelated to the first unit bearing that designation. The 54th Infantry Brigade initially consisted of the 107th and 108th Infantry Regiments. On 1 August 1940, the 107th Infantry was converted into the 207th Coast Artillery Regiment, and the 165th Infantry, formerly part of the 93rd Infantry Brigade, was assigned in its place as of 20 June 1940.

The designated mobilization point and annual training center for the “Empire” Division was Camp Smith, near Peekskill, New York. The mobilization point was changed in 1939 to Camp Foster, Florida. The division, less the 52nd Field Artillery Brigade, conducted annual training most years at Camp Smith, from 1922 to 1939, while the 52nd Field Artillery Brigade trained most years at Pine Camp, New York, so that its batteries could conduct live-fire training at the artillery ranges located there. Generally, the division staff conducted command post exercises and staff training concurrent with the annual training camps. In 1929, the division staff participated in the Second Corps Area command post exercise from 7–29 July at Camp Dix, New Jersey, and in the First Army command post exercises in July 1931 and July 1934 also held at Camp Dix.

In summer 1935, the division participated in the Second Corps Area phase of the First Army maneuvers at Pine Camp. During that maneuver, the 27th Division operated as part of the provisional II Corps against the provisional I Corps. The “Empire” Division also participated in the First Army Maneuvers in the summers of 1939 and 1940 held at Plattsburg and Canton, New York, respectively. In both maneuvers, the 27th Division again operated as part of the provisional II Corps against the provisional I Corps. The division was inducted into active federal service at home stations on 15 October 1940, relieved from the II Corps, and assigned to the VII Corps. Instead of Camp Foster, however, the Empire Division was ordered to move to Fort McClellan, Alabama, where it arrived on 25 October 1940. After the division’s initial train-up period, it participated in the Carolina Maneuvers in October–November 1941.

=== World War II ===
==== WWII division organization ====
===== Square division =====
On 15 October 1940, the 27th Division was inducted into federal service at home stations and then assembled at Fort McClellan in Alabama. At the time the division still retained its World War I square organization and consisted of the following units.

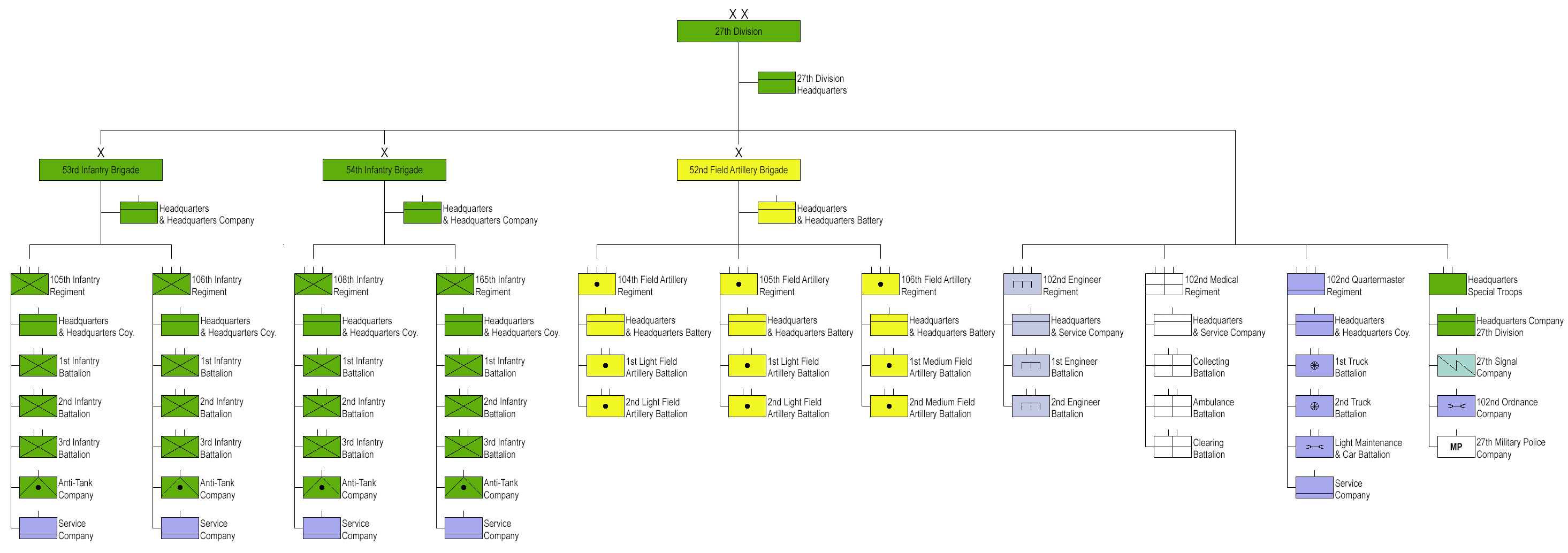
27th Division square organization (click to enlarge)

- 27th Division
  - 27th Division Headquarters
  - 53rd Infantry Brigade
    - Headquarters and Headquarters Company
    - 105th Infantry Regiment
      - Headquarters and Headquarters Company
      - 3× Infantry battalions
        - each battalion consists of: 1× Headquarters and Headquarters Detachment, 3× Rifle companies, 1× Weapons Company
      - Anti-Tank Company (M3 37mm Anti-Tank guns)
      - Service Company
    - 106th Infantry Regiment
      - same organization as 105th Infantry Regiment
  - 54th Infantry Brigade
    - Headquarters and Headquarters Company
    - 108th Infantry Regiment
      - same organization as 105th Infantry Regiment
    - 165th Infantry Regiment
      - same organization as 105th Infantry Regiment
  - 52nd Field Artillery Brigade
    - Headquarters and Headquarters Battery
    - 104th Field Artillery Regiment
      - Headquarters and Headquarters Battery
      - 2× Light Field Artillery battalions
        - Headquarters and Headquarters Battery
        - 3× Howitzer batteries (M1897 75mm field guns), replaced by M2 105mm towed howitzers in 1941)
        - Service Battery
    - 105th Field Artillery Regiment
      - same organization as 104th Field Artillery Regiment
    - 106th Field Artillery Regiment
      - Headquarters and Headquarters Battery
      - 2× Medium Field Artillery battalions
        - Headquarters and Headquarters Battery
        - 3× Howitzer batteries (M1918 155mm towed howitzers, replaced by M1 155mm towed howitzers in 1941)
        - Anti-Tank Battery (M1897 75mm anti-tank guns)
        - Service Battery
  - 102nd Engineer Regiment
    - Headquarters and Headquarters and Service Company
    - 2× Engineer battalions
      - each battalion consists of: 1× Headquarters, 3× Engineer companies
  - 102nd Medical Regiment
    - Headquarters and Headquarters and Service Company
    - Collecting Battalion
      - battalion consists of: 1× Headquarters, 3× Collecting companies
    - Ambulance Battalion
      - battalion consists of: 1× Headquarters, 3× Ambulance companies
    - Clearing Battalion
      - battalion consists of: 1× Headquarters, 3× Clearing companies
  - 102nd Quartermaster Regiment
    - Headquarters and Headquarters Company
    - 2× Truck battalions
      - each battalion consists of: 1× Headquarters, 2× Truck companies
    - Light Maintenance and Car Battalion
      - battalion consists of: 1× Headquarters, 1× Light Maintenance Company, 1× Car Company
    - Service Company
  - Headquarters, Special Troops
    - Headquarters Company, 27th Division
    - 27th Signal Company
    - 102nd Ordnance Company
    - 27th Military Police Company

Following the Japanese attack on Pearl Harbor, the division was one of the first stateside divisions to be assigned defensive duties. On 14 December 1941, the 27th Division departed Fort McClellan for California to establish blocking positions against a seaborne invasion of the United States' southwestern coast. In spring 1942 the division was sent to Hawaii, arriving on 21 May 1942, to defend the outer islands from amphibious attack.

===== Triangular division =====
On 1 September 1942, as a part of an Army-wide reorganization of National Guard divisions, the 27th Division was reorganized as a triangular division. The 27th was the last of the National Guard divisions to make this change, as it had been earmarked for overseas shipment and had departed for Hawaii in the midst of the other divisions being converted in the spring of 1942, and Army officials in Hawaii had prepared facilities to receive the units of a larger "square" division. The division's two brigade headquarters were disbanded in favor of a structure containing three separate regimental commands reporting directly to the division headquarters, as well as four field artillery battalions under a division artillery headquarters, with the engineer, medical, and quartermaster regiments also reduced to battalions. The 108th Infantry Regiment was transferred to the 40th Infantry Division of the California Army National Guard. With the reorganization the division was renamed 27th Infantry Division. Afterwards the 27th Infantry Division was composed of the following units:

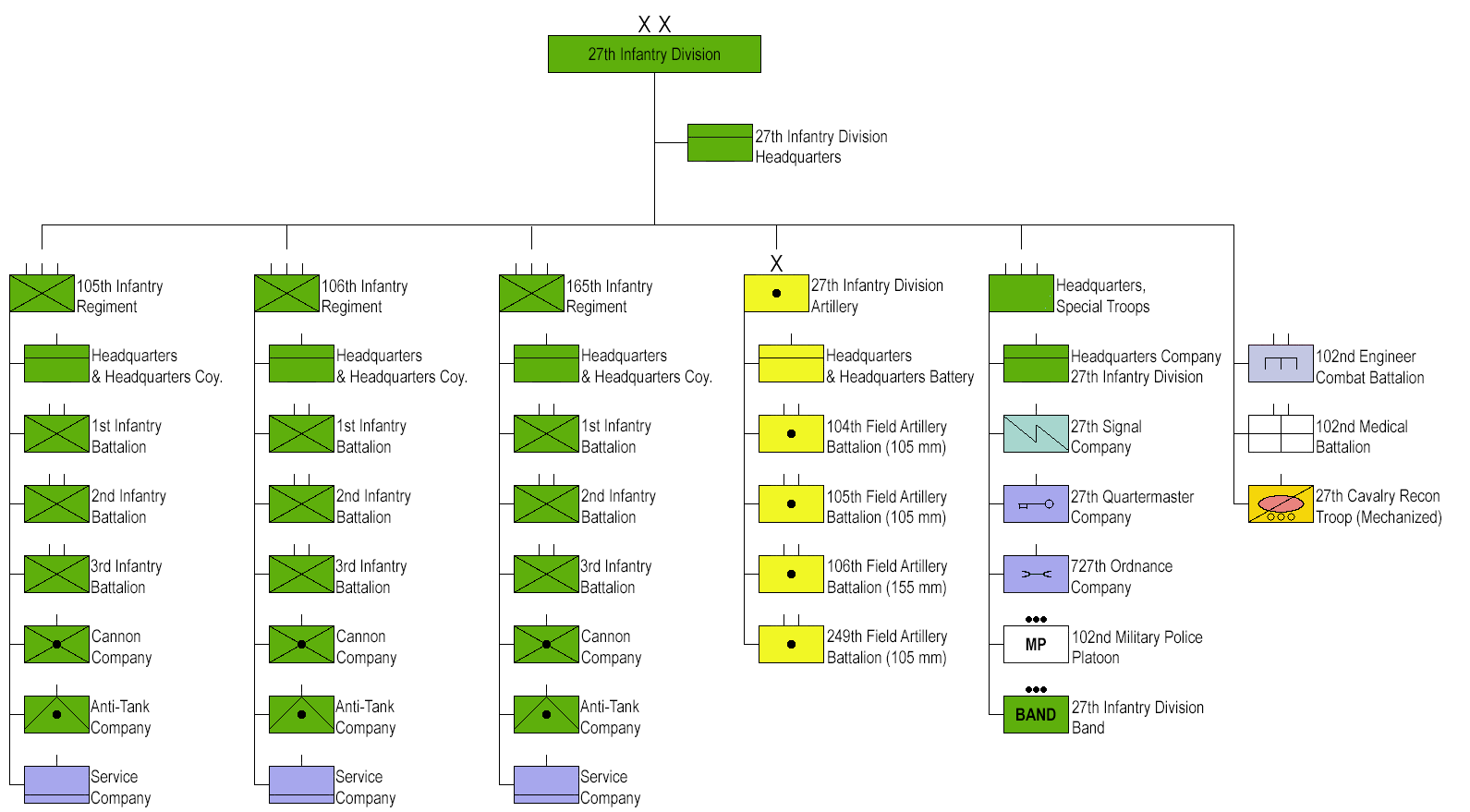
27th Infantry Division triangular organization (click to enlarge)

- 27th Infantry Division
  - 27th Infantry Division Headquarters
  - 27th Cavalry Reconnaissance Troop (Mechanized) (M3 scout cars and then M8 Greyhound armored cars)
  - 105th Infantry Regiment
    - Headquarters and Headquarters Company
    - 3× Infantry battalions
      - each battalion consists of: 1× Headquarters and Headquarters Company, 3× Rifle companies, 1× Heavy Weapons Company
    - Cannon Company (T12 Gun Motor Carriages and T19 Howitzer Motor Carriages, later replaced by either M3 105mm towed howitzers or M7 Priest self propelled howitzers)
    - Anti-Tank Company (M3 37mm anti-tank guns, which were replaced by 1944 with M1 57mm anti-tank guns)
    - Service Company
  - 106th Infantry Regiment
    - same organization as 105th Infantry Regiment
  - 165th Infantry Regiment
    - same organization as 105th Infantry Regiment
  - 27th Infantry Division Artillery
    - Headquarters and Headquarters Battery
    - 104th Field Artillery Battalion
      - Headquarters and Headquarters Battery
      - 3× Batteries (M2 105mm towed howitzers)
      - Service Battery
    - 105th Field Artillery Battalion
      - same organization as 104th Field Artillery Battalion
    - 106th Field Artillery Battalion
      - Headquarters and Headquarters Battery
      - 3× Batteries (M1 155mm towed howitzers)
      - Service Battery
    - 249th Field Artillery Battalion
      - same organization as 104th Field Artillery Battalion
  - Headquarters Special Troops
    - Headquarters Company, 27th Infantry Division
    - 27th Signal Company
    - 27th Quartermaster Company
    - 727th Ordnance Light Maintenance Company
    - 102nd Military Police Platoon
    - 27th Infantry Division Band (attached)
  - 27th Quartermaster Battalion (Between September and November 1942 Quartermaster battalions were disbanded and their platoons used to form a Quartermaster Company and an Ordnance Company, which were both assigned to Headquarters Special Troops)
    - Headquarters and Headquarters Company (includes a service platoon and a maintenance platoon)
    - Truck Company
  - 102nd Engineer Combat Battalion
    - Headquarters and Headquarters and Service Company
    - 3× Engineer combat companies
  - 102nd Medical Battalion
    - Headquarters and Headquarters Detachment
    - 3× Collecting companies
    - Clearing Company

==== Combat chronicle ====
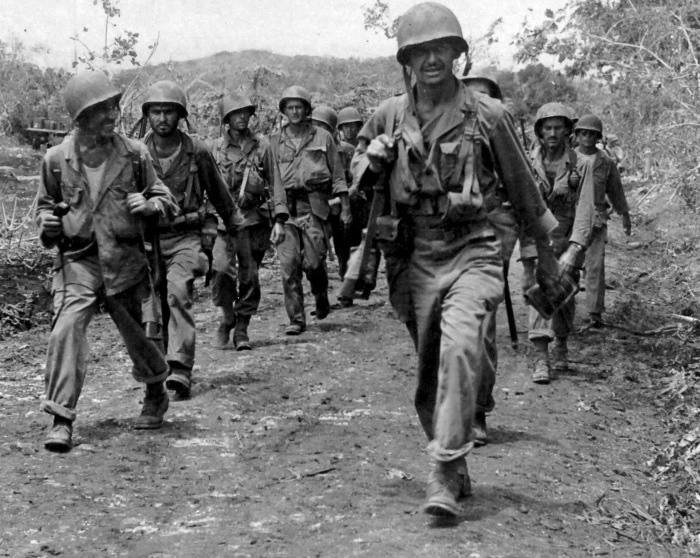
Soldiers of the 27th Division, New York Army National Guard, move inland after their landings of June 16, 1944, during operations on Saipan.

The 165th Infantry Regiment and 3rd Battalion, 105th Infantry first saw action against the enemy during the attack and capture of Makin Atoll in the Gilbert Islands, 21–24 November 1943. The 1st and 3rd Battalions of the 106th Regiment participated in the attack on Eniwetok Atoll, 19–26 February 1944, returning to Oahu in March. During this mission, the 2nd Battalion, 106th Infantry landed unopposed on Majuro Island, 1 February, and completed its seizure, 3 February. The division began preparations for the Marianas operations, 15 March. On D-day plus 1, 16 June 1944, elements landed at night on Saipan to support the Second and Fourth Marine Divisions. A beachhead was established and Aslito Airfield captured, 18 June. Fighting continued throughout June. Marine General Holland Smith, unsatisfied with the performance of the 27th Division, relieved its commander, Army General Ralph C. Smith., which led to angry recrimination from senior Army commanders, including Army Chief of Staff George C. Marshall. During a pitched battle, 7 July, Japanese overran elements of the division in a banzai attack, but organized resistance was crushed the next day. During the months of July and August, the 27th cleaned out isolated pockets in the mountains and cliffs of Saipan.

Men of the 27th Division crossing a pontoon bridge on Okinawa. 21 April 1945.

Beginning in the middle of August, the division moved to the New Hebrides for rest and rehabilitation. On 25 March 1945, the 27th sailed from Espiritu Santo, arriving at Okinawa, 9 April 1945. The Division participated in the XXIV Corps general attack, 19 April 1945, securing a dominating ridge line south of Machinato and Kakazu. Machinato Airfield was captured, 28 April, after a severe struggle. On 1 May, the division was relieved by the 1st Marine Division and attached to the Island Command for garrison duty. Tori Shima was seized, 12 May, without opposition. The 27th attacked from the south end of Ishikawa Isthmus to sweep the northern sector of Okinawa. The enemy fought bitterly on Onnatake Hill from 23 May until 2 June, before losing the strong point. After a mopping-up period, the division left Okinawa, 7 September 1945, moved to Japan and occupied Niigata and Fukushima Prefectures.

- Overseas: 10 March 1942.
- Campaigns: Divisional elements participated in various campaigns in the Pacific Theater:
- Distinguished Unit Citations: 2.
- Awards: MH: 4; DSC: 21; DSM: 2; Silver Star: 412; LM: 15; SM: 13; BSM: 986; AM: 9.
- Returned to U.S.: 15 December 1945
- Inactivated: 31 December 1945

==== Casualties ====
- Total battle casualties: 6,533
- Killed in action: 1,512
- Wounded in action: 4,980
- Missing in action: 40
- Prisoner of war: 1

Campaign participation credits, 27th Infantry Division
Unit	Campaign participation credit
Headquarters, 27th Infantry Division	Central Pacific, Ryukyus, Western Pacific (Ground)
105th Infantry Regiment	Central Pacific, Ryukyus, Western Pacific (Ground)
106th Infantry Regiment	Eastern Mandates (Ground), Ryukyus, Western Pacific (Ground)
165th Infantry Regiment	Central Pacific, Ryukyus, Western Pacific (Ground)
Headquarters and Headquarters Battery, 27th Infantry Division Artillery	Ryukyus, Western Pacific (Ground)
104th Field Artillery Battalion	Eastern Mandates (Ground), Ryukyus, Western Pacific (Ground)
105th Field Artillery Battalion	Ryukyus, Western Pacific (Ground)
106th Field Artillery Battalion	Ryukyus, Western Pacific (Ground)
249th Field Artillery Battalion	Ryukyus, Western Pacific (Ground)
102nd Engineer Combat Battalion	Central Pacific, Eastern Mandates (Ground), Ryukyus, Western Pacific (Ground)
102nd Medical Battalion	Central Pacific, Eastern Mandates (Ground), Ryukyus, Western Pacific (Ground)
27th Cavalry Reconnaissance Troop (Mechanized)	Ryukyus, Western Pacific (Ground)
Headquarters, Special Troops, 27th Infantry Division	Ryukyus
Headquarters Company, 27th Infantry Division	Central Pacific, Ryukyus, Western Pacific (Ground)
727th Ordnance Light Maintenance Company	Ryukyus, Western Pacific (Ground)
27th Quartermaster Company	Central Pacific, Ryukyus, Western Pacific (Ground)
27th Signal Company	Central Pacific, Eastern Mandates (Ground), Ryukyus, Western Pacific (Ground)
Military Police Platoon	Ryukyus, Western Pacific (Ground)
Band	Ryukyus, Western Pacific (Ground)
27th Counterintelligence Corps Detachment	Ryukyus

=== Postwar ===
The division was reformed as a National Guard formation on 21 April 1947. The division was reconstituted along the lines of its wartime structure with limited reorganizations.

On 1 February 1955 the 27th Division became the 27th Armored Division; it retained many of its former units, and division commander Ronald C. Brock continued to lead the organization.

On 1 February 1968, the division was reorganized as the 27th Armored Brigade, a unit of the 50th Armored Division.

The 27th Armored Brigade was reorganized as an infantry brigade in 1975 and aligned with the 42nd Infantry Division.

In 1985 the 27th Infantry Brigade was activated as part of the New York Army National Guard, and assigned as the "roundout" brigade of the Army's 10th Mountain Division.

The 27th Brigade was later reorganized as the 27th Infantry Brigade Combat Team, and reestablished use of the 27th Infantry Division's NYD shoulder sleeve insignia. The 27th Infantry Brigade carries on the lineage and history of the 27th Infantry Division.

== Order of battle ==
=== WWI chain of command deployed ===
- Fourth Army, British Expeditionary Force
  - II Corps, American Expeditionary Force

=== Organization Jul – Nov 1917 ===
- Division Headquarters
  - 1st Brigade
    - 7th Infantry
    - 12th Infantry
    - 14th Infantry
  - 2d Brigade
    - 1st Infantry
    - 23d Infantry
    - 71st Infantry
  - 3d Brigade
    - 2d Infantry
    - 3d Infantry
    - 74th Infantry
  - Brigade Field Artillery
    - 1st Field Artillery
    - 2d Field Artillery
    - 3d Field Artillery
    - 1st Cavalry
    - Squadron A and Machine Gun Troop
    - 22d Engineers
    - 1st Battalion, Signal Corps
  - Trains
    - Military Police
    - Ammunition Train
    - Supply Train
    - Engineer Train
  - Sanitary Train
    - Headquarters Ambulance Companies
      - 1st Ambulance Company
      - 2d Ambulance Company
      - 3d Ambulance Company
      - 4th Ambulance Company
    - Headquarters Field Hospital
      - 1st Field Hospital
      - 2d Field Hospital
      - 3d Field Hospital
      - 4th Field Hospital

=== Organization from November 1917 ===
Reorganized into two brigades of two infantry regiments each.

- Headquarters, 27th Division
- 53rd Infantry Brigade
  - 105th Infantry Regiment
  - 106th Infantry Regiment
  - 105th Machine Gun Battalion
- 54th Infantry Brigade
  - 107th Infantry Regiment
  - 108th Infantry Regiment
  - 106th Machine Gun Battalion
- 52nd Field Artillery Brigade
  - 104th Field Artillery Regiment (75 mm)
  - 105th Field Artillery Regiment (75 mm)
  - 106th Field Artillery Regiment (155 mm)
  - 102nd Trench Mortar Battery
- 104th Machine Gun Battalion
- 102nd Engineer Regiment
- 102nd Field Signal Battalion
- Headquarters Troop, 27th Division
- 102nd Train Headquarters and Military Police
  - 102nd Ammunition Train
  - 102nd Supply Train
  - 102nd Engineer Train
  - 102nd Sanitary Train
    - 105th-108th Ambulance Companies and Field Hospitals

The artillery elements were reassigned upon arrival in France, and did not see service with the 27th Division during combat.

=== Organization, 1948-1954 ===
- Headquarters and Headquarters Company, 27th Infantry Division
- 105th Infantry Regiment
- 108th Infantry Regiment
- 174th Infantry Regiment
- Headquarters and Headquarters Battery, 27th Infantry Division Artillery
  - 156th Field Artillery Battalion
  - 170th Field Artillery Battalion
  - 249th Field Artillery Battalion
  - 127th Antiaircraft Artillery Automatic Weapons Battalion
- 127th Tank Battalion
- 152nd Engineer Battalion
- 134th Medical Battalion
- 27th Reconnaissance Company
- 27th Infantry Division Band
- 27th Military Police Company
- 727th Ordnance Company
- 27th Quartermaster Company
- 27th Replacement Company
- 27th Signal Company

== Commanders ==
=== World War I ===
- Maj. Gen. John F. O'Ryan (16 July 1917)
- Brig. Gen. Charles L. Phillips (19 September 1917)
- Maj. Gen. John F. O'Ryan (6 December 1917)
- Brig. Gen. Charles L. Phillips (23 December 1917)
- Maj. Gen. John F. O'Ryan (29 December 1917)
- Brig. Gen. Charles L. Phillips (22 February 1918)
- Maj. Gen. John F. O'Ryan (1 March 1918)
- Brig. Gen. Palmer E. Pierce (16 June 1918)
- Maj. Gen. John F. O'Ryan (18 June 1918)
- Brig. Gen. Palmer E. Pierce (14 November 1918)
- Maj. Gen. John F. O'Ryan (23 November 1918)

=== Interwar period ===
- Maj. Gen. John F. O'Ryan (23 December 1921 – 22 May 1923)
- Maj. Gen. Charles W. Berry, Sr. (24 May 1923 – 31 December 1925)
- Brig. Gen. George B. Dyer (31 December 1925 – 28 January 1926)
- Maj. Gen. William N. Haskell (28 January 1926 – 21 November 1941)

=== World War II ===
- Maj. Gen. Ralph McT. Pennell (21 November 1941 – 19 November 1942)
- Maj. Gen. Ralph C. Smith (November 1942-June 1944)
- Maj. Gen. George W. Griner Jr. (June 1944-December 1945)

== Members ==
=== Mexican border ===
- Daniel W. Hand, U.S. Army officer
- Doc Rankin, U.S. Army officer and cartoonist

=== World War I ===
- Harry Hill Bandholtz, U.S. Army officer
- Charles W. Berry, physician and New York City Comptroller
- Albert H. Blanding, U.S. Army officer
- Charles Brand, Australian liaison officer and member of the Australian Senate
- Charles I. DeBevoise, U.S. Army officer
- Charles Devine, poet and playwright
- Monk Eastman, gangster
- Alan Louis Eggers, Medal of Honor recipient
- Stanley H. Ford, U.S. Army officer
- Frank Gaffney, Medal of Honor recipient
- Clarence E. Hancock, member of the United States House of Representatives
- Ridgely Hunt, publishing executive and professor
- Bernard W. Kearney, member of the United States House of Representatives
- J. Leslie Kincaid, businessman and member of the New York State Assembly
- Oswald Knauth, economist and business executive
- Mark T. Lambert, businessman and member of the New York State Assembly
- John Cridland Latham, Medal of Honor recipient
- Albert Leffingwell, novelist
- Robert Michie, U.S. Army officer
- James J. Murphy, member of the United States House of Representatives
- Harry Murray, Australian liaison officer and Victoria Cross recipient
- Harold C. Ostertag, member of the United States House of Representatives
- Charles L. Phillips, U.S. Army officer
- William Sinclair-Burgess, New Zealand liaison officer and Commandant of New Zealand Military Forces
- Theodore Sizer, art historian and member of the Monuments Men
- Edward Streeter, novelist and journalist
- E. Leroy Sweetser, U.S. Army officer and attorney
- John Thomas Taylor, lobbyist for the American Legion
- William B. Turner, Medal of Honor recipient
- Michael Valente, Medal of Honor recipient
- Cornelius Vanderbilt III, engineer, inventor, and yachtsman.
- Cornelius Vanderbilt IV, newspaper publisher, journalist, and author.
- Franklin W. Ward U.S. Army officer
- Cornelius W. Wickersham, U.S. Army officer and lawyer

=== Interwar period ===
- George Augustus Vaughn Jr., fighter ace

=== World War II ===
- John C. Baker, U.S. Army officer
- Thomas Baker, Medal of Honor recipient
- Brendan A. Burns, U.S. Army officer
- William T. Carneal, U.S. Army soldier
- Martin H. Foery, U.S. Army officer
- Bernard Gavrin, U.S. Army soldier
- Arthur M. Harper, U.S. Army officer
- Sanderford Jarman, U.S. Army officer
- Mickey Marcus, organizer of war crimes tribunals after World War II and first general in the Israeli army.
- Charles Coudert Nast, U.S. Army officer and attorney
- William Needles, actor and teacher
- William J. O'Brien, Medal of Honor recipient
- James Roosevelt, USMC officer attached to division during the Battle of Makin, son of FDR
- Ogden J. Ross, U.S. Army officer and member of the New York State Senate
- Alejandro R. Ruiz, Medal of Honor recipient
- Ben L. Salomon, Medal of Honor recipient

== Bibliography ==
- Cameron, David W. (2018). Australians on the Western Front: 1918. Vol. 2. Penguin Random House Australia. pp. 387–436. ISBN 978-0-670-07828-8.
