= Sanderford Jarman =

United States Army general (1884-1954)

- Born: November 24, 1884; Boatner, Louisiana, United States
- Died: October 15, 1954 (aged 69); Boston, Massachusetts, United States
- Burial place: Arlington National Cemetery, Virginia, United States
- Military career
- Allegiance: United States
- Branch: United States Army
- Service years: 1908–1946
- Rank: Major General
- Commands: 27th Infantry Division
- Conflicts: World War I; World War II; Battle of Saipan
- Awards: Legion of Merit; Army Distinguished Service Medal (3); Navy Distinguished Service Medal

Sanderford Jarman (November 24, 1884 – October 15, 1954) was a senior officer in the United States Army known best for his service during the Pacific War. During the Battle of Saipan, Jarman would replace Ralph C. Smith as commander of the 27th Infantry Division midway through the battle.
