= Stanley H. Ford =

United States Army general

Stanley Hamer Ford
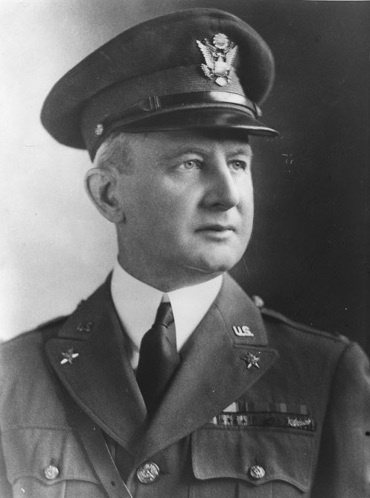
- Born: January 30, 1877; Columbus, Ohio, United States
- Died: January 19, 1961 (aged 83); Carlisle Barracks, Pennsylvania, United States
- Burial place: Laurel Hill Cemetery, Philadelphia, Pennsylvania, United States
- Military career
- Allegiance: United States
- Branch: United States Army
- Service years: 1898–1941
- Rank: Lieutenant General
- Unit: Infantry Branch
- Commands: 16th Infantry Regiment; 1st Brigade; Philippine Department; 1st Infantry Division; Seventh Corps Area; Sixth Corps Area; Second Army
- Conflicts: Spanish–American War; World War I World War II
- Awards: Army Distinguished Service Medal; French Legion of Honor; Belgian Croix de Guerre; Spanish Campaign Medal; Philippine Campaign Medal; Cuban Pacification Medal; World War I Victory Medal
- Other work: Deputy Director, New York State Civil Defense

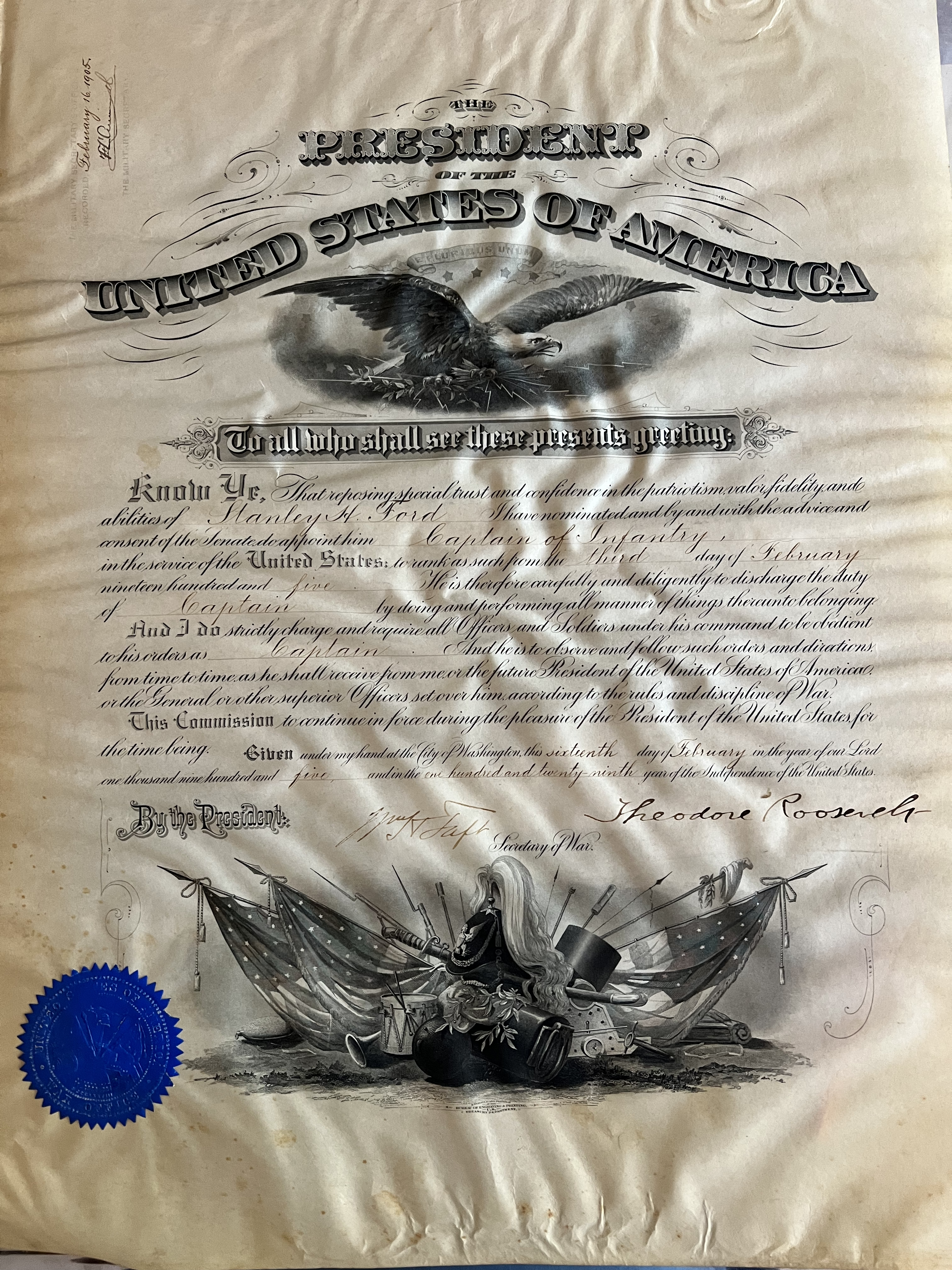
Military Appointment promoting Stanley H. Ford to rank of Captain on February 16th 1905 signed by William Taft and Theodore Roosevelt.

Lieutenant General Stanley Hamer Ford (January 30, 1877 – January 19, 1961) was a senior officer of the United States Army. After serving in numerous conflicts and wars, including World War I, He was commander of the Philippine Department, 1st Infantry Division, Seventh Corps Area, Sixth Corps Area, and the Second Army.

== Early life ==
Ford was born on January 30, 1877, in Columbus, Ohio. Ford graduated from the Ohio State University with a Bachelor of Philosophy degree in 1898, and was a member of the Sigma Alpha Epsilon fraternity. He was then commissioned as a second lieutenant of Infantry in the United States Army.

== Spanish–American War ==
Ford saw service in Cuba and the Philippines during the Spanish–American War, serving with the 16th Infantry in Cuba and the 25th Infantry in the Philippines.

== Post Spanish–American War ==
After the war he served in a series of staff and command assignments, including Infantry and Quartermaster postings to Jefferson Barracks, Missouri, Washington, D.C., and the installation now known as Fort Drum, New York.

== World War I ==
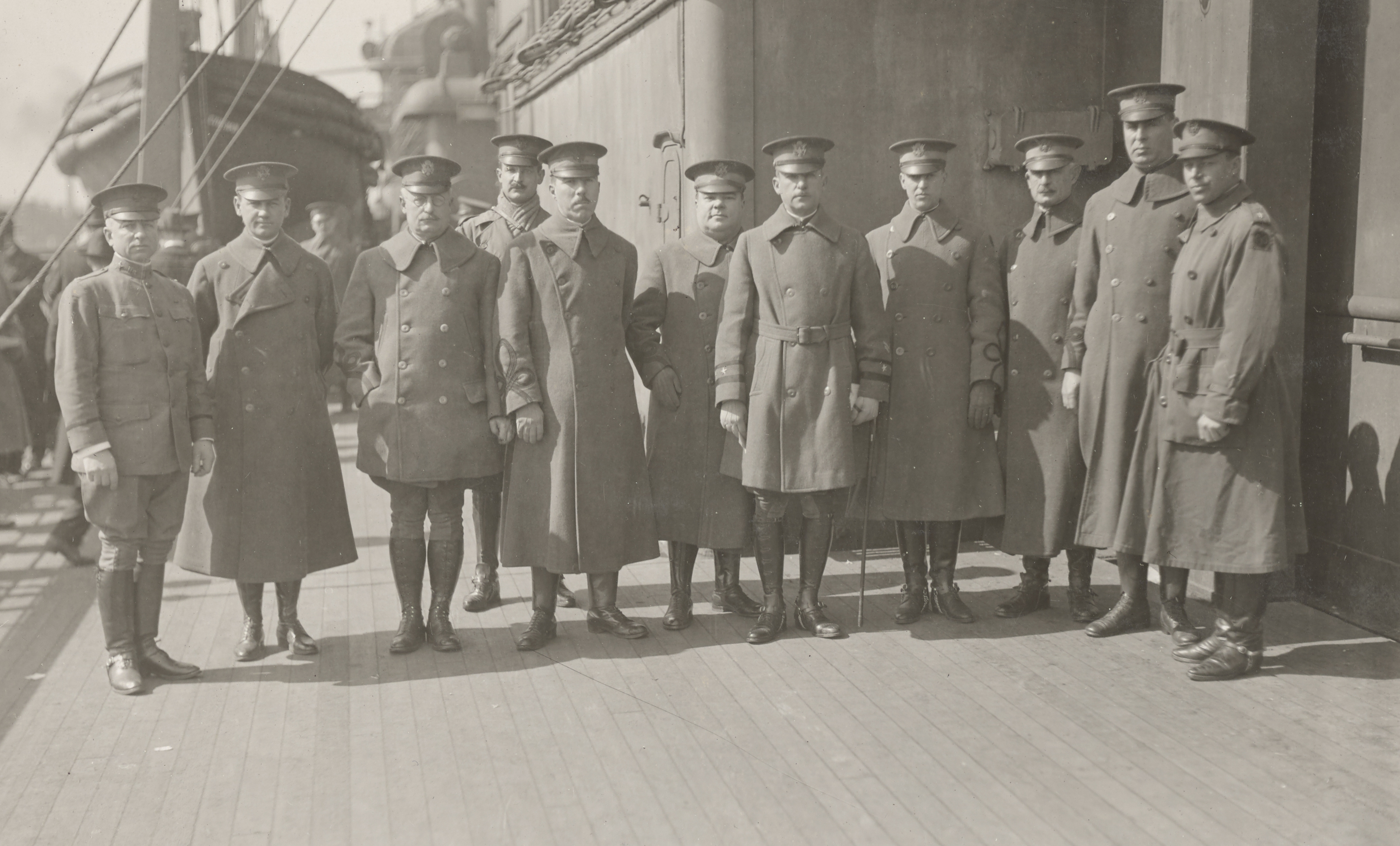
Major General John F. O'Ryan and members of his staff on top deck of Leviathan just after the boat was docked, March 1919. Stood second on the left is Colonel Stanley H. Ford.

During World War I, he served as Assistant Chief of Staff of the 84th Infantry Division and Chief of Staff of the 27th Infantry Division. In recognition of his services during the war he was awarded the Army Distinguished Service Medal. The citation for the medal reads:

The President of the United States of America, authorized by Act of Congress, July 9, 1918, takes pleasure in presenting the Army Distinguished Service Medal to Colonel (Infantry) Stanley Hamer Ford, United States Army, for exceptionally meritorious and distinguished services to the Government of the United States, in a duty of great responsibility during World War I. As Chief of Staff of the 27th Division, Colonel Ford rendered valuable services in the operations of this division. By tireless energy, good judgment, and keen foresight he proved to be an important factor in the brilliant military operations of the 27th Division.

== Post World War I ==
Ford continued his Army career after the war, completing the General Staff College in 1920.

He served as commander of the 16th Infantry Regiment from 1924 to 1926.

From 1926 to 1930 Ford served as Assistant Chief of Staff of the Army's Military Intelligence Division.

Ford attained the rank of brigadier general in 1930. In the early 1930s, General Ford served as military attache in Paris, France. He then commanded 1st Brigade 1st Infantry Division. After his brigade command, Ford took command of the Philippine Department.

Ford was promoted to major general in 1936 and successively commanded 1st Infantry Division Seventh Corps Area, Sixth Corps Area, and Second Army simultaneously with Sixth Corps Area.

In October 1938 Ford took command of the Second Army, which was responsible for overseeing U.S. Army organizations in several mid-western and southern states. On 5 August 1939, he was promoted temporarily to lieutenant general in accordance with "An Act To provide for the rank and title of lieutenant general of the Regular Army." He was one of the first four active duty officers promoted to lieutenant general since 1918.,

He was a member of the Military Order of Foreign Wars.

== World War II ==
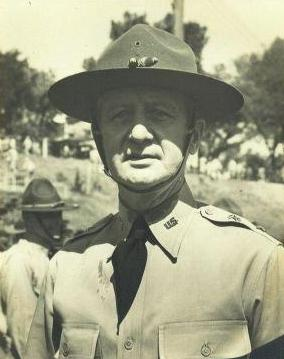
Ford during 1940 Second Army maneuvers

As commander of Second Army Ford oversaw execution of large scale maneuvers and exercises by active Army and National Guard troops that enhanced their readiness in anticipation of fighting in Europe and the Pacific during World War II.

General Ford ended his military career upon reaching mandatory retirement age in January, 1941.

== Post military career ==
During World War II he assisted John F. O'Ryan, the World War I commander of the 27th Infantry Division, during O'Ryan's assignment as New York State's Civil Defense Director.

== Personal ==
General Ford married Lona Pace in 1904. Their son Hamer Pace Ford (1905–1950) graduated from West Point in 1924 and was a career Army officer, attaining the rank of Colonel before his death in Berlin, Germany. In 1933 General Ford married Katherine Welch of Philadelphia.

== Death and interment ==
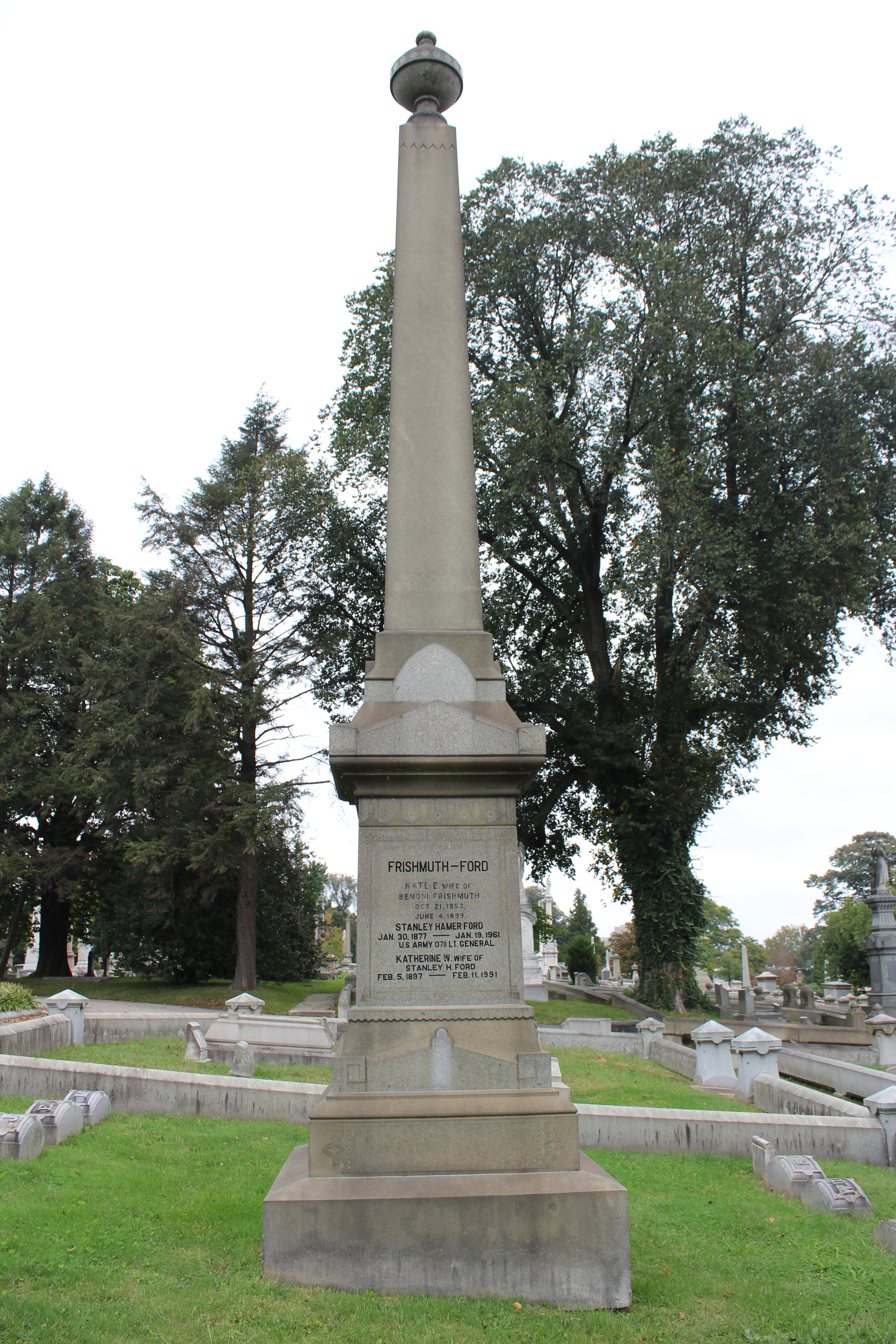
Stanley Hamer Ford tombstone in Laurel Hill Cemetery

General Ford died at the Army's Carlisle Barracks on January 19, 1961, while en route to John F. Kennedy's inaugural. He was buried in Philadelphia's Laurel Hill Cemetery, Section K, Lot 214-SW 1/4.

== Awards and decorations ==
- Distinguished Service Medal - in recognition of his superior performance with the 27th Division in World War I.
- Spanish Campaign Medal
- Philippine Campaign Medal
- Cuban Pacification Medal
- World War I Victory Medal
- American Defense Service Medal
- Officer of the French Legion of Honor
- Belgian Croix de Guerre with palm

In 1940 General Ford received an honorary Doctor of Laws degree from the Ohio State University.

== Dates of rank ==
No insignia in 1898	Second lieutenant, Regular Army: July 28, 1898
	First lieutenant, Regular Army: June 16, 1899
	Captain, Regular Army: February 3, 1905
	Major, Regular Army: May 15, 1917
	Lieutenant colonel, National Army: August 5, 1917
	Colonel, Regular Army: July 30, 1918
	Major, Regular Army: August 31, 1919; Discharged and reappointed in permanent rank of Major.
	Lieutenant colonel, Regular Army: July 1, 1920
	Colonel, Regular Army: September 1, 1920
	Brigadier general, Regular Army: September 1, 1930
	Major general, Regular Army: March 1, 1936
	Lieutenant general, Temporary: August 5, 1939
	Lieutenant general, Retired List: January 31, 1941
