= John Thomas Taylor =

United States Army general

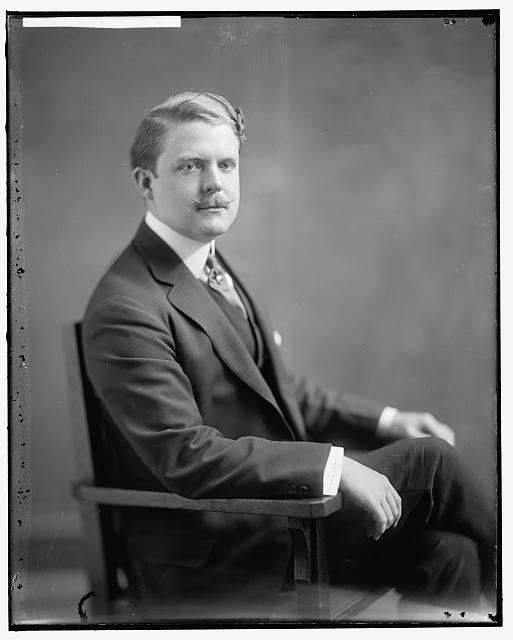
- Born: 1886; Philadelphia, Pennsylvania
- Died: May 21, 1965; Washington, DC
- Relatives: Louis Elizabeth Catlin, wife; Stuart Taylor, son
- Military career
- Allegiance: United States of America
- Branch: United States Army
- Service years: 1917-1945
- Rank: Brigadier General
- Awards: Cross of the Legion of Honor
- Other work: Lobbyist for the American Legion

John Thomas Taylor (1886 – May 21, 1965) was an American lawyer and soldier best known for being a lobbyist for the American Legion from 1919 to 1950. During his time as a lobbyist he was able to have over six hundred bills passed by the U.S. Congress that benefited veterans and was on the cover of Time magazine.

== Early life ==
Taylor was born in Philadelphia, Pennsylvania. He graduated from Temple University where he was a member of Sigma Pi fraternity in 1909. He received his law degree from the University of Pennsylvania.

== Military career and personal life ==
Taylor enlisted in the infantry of the U.S. Army on the day the U.S. entered World War I. During that war he attained the rank of captain and was in four offensives during his seventeen months in Europe. He served with both the 27th and 79th divisions. At the end of the war his unit was stationed in occupied Germany.

Taylor married Louis Elizabeth Catlin on August 21, 1926, in Washington, DC. They would have one son, Stuart, in 1940.

In 1941, three months before Pearl Harbor, General George C. Marshall recalled Taylor to active duty and promoted him to full colonel. He was appointed assistant director of Army Public Relations. In 1942 he went abroad with General George Patton's Seventh Army, where he participated actively in the landings of Operation Torch near Casablanca, and continued with the main forces through the invasions of Sicily, Italy, and Southern France. During this time he was promoted to Brigadier General.

== American Legion lobbyist ==
At the end of World War I, Taylor was a delegate to the caucus in Paris that established the American Legion. After returning to the United States in 1919, he became Vice Chairman of the Legion's National Legislative Committee and chief lobbyist. His law office in Washington served as the organization's temporary headquarters and he would spend most of the next thirty-one years with the organization. He also witnessed President Woodrow Wilson's signing the articles of incorporation for the Legion.

Taylor was described by one reporter, Clarence Woodbury of The American Magazine, as "the most successful lobbyist in the history of the world." Before World War II, he had been able to have 630 different veterans' bills passed through Congress that benefited ex-servicemen by more than 13 billion dollars. Another reporter, with the North American Review, suspected that he received "a good deal more fun out of his profession than the average lobbyist." In 1932, when President Herbert Hoover described "a locust swarm of lobbyists" that haunted the halls of Congress, Time magazine named Taylor as one of the agents who was paid $10,000 per year for their actions. He made it a point to know every member of Congress by their first name.

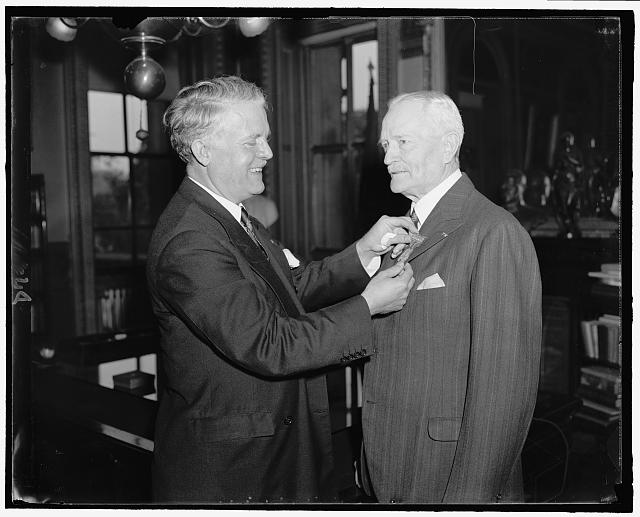
Col. John Thomas Taylor (left) and Gen. John Pershing in 1938 or 1939

Almost immediately upon his return from Europe at the end of World War I, Taylor became an effective advocate for ex-servicemen and women. He testified before the United States House Committee on Interstate and Foreign Commerce in January 1921 on the subject of the Bureau of Veterans Reestablishment. He publicly criticized the U.S. Chamber of Commerce in 1922 for a referendum they conducted on the soldiers' bonus plan. The referendum came out against the plan, so Taylor sent a letter to every U.S. Senator explaining the American Legion's position. He was eventually able to get the World War Adjusted Compensation Act passed in 1924.

In 1931, Taylor was appointed to the President's Advisory Committee on Veteran Preference. In April of that year it recommended that veterans be given preference in civil service hiring. This resulted in President Hoover signing Executive Order 5610 on April 24.

Taylor appeared on the January 31, 1935 cover of Time magazine and in 1937 he received the Cross of the Legion of Honor from Marshall Philippe Pétain.

During a bitter vote on bonuses in the 1930s, Taylor brought the Speaker of the House a petition with 1.5 million signatures and had fifty crippled officers placed in the House gallery's front row to watch the debate.

The Legion saw itself as the defender of veterans as well as Americanism. After the 1935 Labor Day Hurricane, which killed about 480 former servicemen and women, the American Legion was very critical of the government and the safety of the New Deal's Works Progress Administration camps. Taylor testified about the event in March 1937 in front of the United States House Committee on World War Veterans' Legislation. When he tried to have the Legion's report "Murder at Matecumbe" read into the Congressional Record he was stopped by Chairman John Elliott Rankin.

When Taylor returned to the U.S. after World War II, he was not satisfied with the original version of the G.I. Bill of Rights. He was able to have it amended in ten different places. He also worked with President Harry S. Truman and others to create several national cemeteries.

== Death ==
Taylor died of a heart attack and was buried in Arlington National Cemetery in Sec: 2, Site: 3408-4 .
