= Bernard Gavrin =

- Bernard Gavrin taken during his army enlistment
- Born: c. 1915
- Died: July 7, 1944 (aged 29); Saipan
- Military career
- Allegiance: United States
- Branch: United States Army
- Service years: 1940–1944
- Rank: Private First Class
- Units: 105th infantry regiment, 27th infantry division
- Conflicts: World War II; Battle of Saipan
- Awards: Bronze Star; Purple Heart; Good Conduct Medal; American Defense Service Medal

Bernard Gavrin (c. 1915 – c. July 9, 1944) was a US Army Private during World War II. He took part in the Battle of Saipan and went missing in action sometime between June 15 and July 9, 1944. No one in his family knew what had happened to him until the Japanese nonprofit Kuentai Group found his remains while recovering remains of Japanese soldiers who died during World War II. His only living relative who knew him was subsequently found and genetic testing revealed that the remains were those of Bernard Gavrin, 70 years after his death. On September 12, 2014, he was finally buried in Arlington National Cemetery.

== Background ==
Gavrin lived in Brooklyn in New York City when he enlisted in the army in 1940. He never married nor had children, but he had a nephew, David Rogers. In 1944, he was in the 105th Infantry Regiment, which formed part of the American invasion force which had landed on Saipan. Sometime between June 15 to July 9, 1944, during which his regiment suffered heavy losses during the Battle of Saipan, he went missing in action. On July 7, 1944, Gavrin was declared missing in action and presumed dead. Gavrin's nephew, David Rogers (12 years old at the time) was present when Gavrin's mother received a telegram notifying her of Gavrin's death. Rogers reported that "She let out a terrifying scream that I can still hear to this day". His remains were declared unrecoverable by the army in 1948. In 1950, his name was placed on the Brooklyn War Memorial.

== Discovery ==
In 2006, the Japanese nonprofit Kuentai Group began recovering the remains of Japanese soldiers from World War II in the Philippines. The group subsequently expanded their search to include Saipan and discovered mass graves while searching in fields. Among the remains of many Japanese soldiers, they found three dog tags belonging to American soldiers—the other soldiers were identified as Army Pvt. William Yawney and Army Pfc. Richard L. Bean. On one dog tag, Bernard Gavrin's name was engraved along with his father's name "Max" as last of kin, and his home address. The Kuentai Group subsequently contacted the Bull Run Regional Library in Virginia with the aim of finding surviving relatives. Tish Como, who worked at the library, used public records in the library to find Bernard's nieces Marilyn Goldman and Beverly Newborn. They contacted David Rogers, Gavrin's nephew.

The remains of the American soldiers that the Kuentai Group found were turned over to the Joint POW/MIA Accounting Command for DNA testing. Using genetic samples provided by David Rogers, Bernard Gavrin's remains were identified 70 years after his death.

== Burial ==
On September 12, 2014, Army Pfc. Bernard Gavrin was buried in Arlington National Cemetery 70 years after his death. The Governor of New York ordered all flags on state buildings in New York be lowered to half-staff on Monday September 15, 2014. He was 29 years old when he died and he was buried with full military honors.

== See also ==
- List of solved missing person cases
- List of unsolved deaths
- William T. Carneal
