= Franklin W. Ward =

US Army major general (1870–1938)

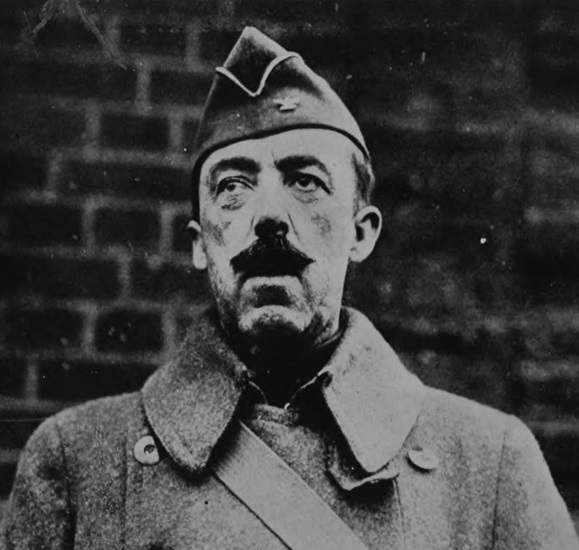
- Ward as commander of the 106th Infantry in 1919
- Born: September 4, 1870; Philadelphia, Pennsylvania, US
- Died: March 17, 1938 (aged 67); Albany, New York, US
- Burial place: Arlington National Cemetery
- Spouse: Mabel Loretta Downs (m. 1898–1934)
- Children: 1
- Military career
- Service: Pennsylvania National Guard; New York National Guard; United States Army
- Service years: 1888–1897 (Pennsylvania National Guard); 1897–1898, 1899–1916, 1919–1934 (New York National Guard); 1898–1899, 1916–1919 (Army)
- Rank: Major General
- Service number: O-101901
- Units: U.S. Army Coast Artillery Corps; U.S. Army Infantry Branch
- Commands: 27th Division Trains; 106th Infantry Regiment; 53rd Infantry Brigade; Adjutant General of New York
- Conflicts: Spanish–American War; Mexican Border War; World War I Occupation of the Rhineland
- Awards: Army Distinguished Service Medal; Legion of Honor (Officer) (France); Croix de Guerre with palm (Belgium); Order of Polonia Restituta (Commander); Order of the Crown of Romania (Grand Officer); New York State Conspicuous Service Medal
- Other work: Author

Franklin W. Ward (4 September 1870 – 17 March 1938) was a career officer in the United States Army. He served as Adjutant General of New York from 1926 to 1934 and attained the rank of major general. A longtime member of the Pennsylvania National Guard and New York National Guard, he was a veteran of the Spanish–American War, Mexican Border War, World War I, and Occupation of the Rhineland. His awards included the Army Distinguished Service Medal, Legion of Honor (Officer) (France), Croix de Guerre with palm (Belgium), Order of Polonia Restituta (Commander), Order of the Crown of Romania (Grand Officer), and New York State Conspicuous Service Medal.

== Early life ==
Franklin Wilmer Ward was born in Philadelphia on 4 December 1870, a son of Thomas Patrick Ward, a Confederate States Army veteran who later managed hotels in Pennsylvania and New York, and Sarah (Stoy) Ward. Ward was educated in Philadelphia and attended the Horace Binney School. In May 1888, he joined the Pennsylvania National Guard as a private. He steadily advanced through the ranks of his Philadelphia-based unit, and was promoted to corporal in 1889, sergeant in 1892, and first sergeant in 1893.

In 1897, Ward moved to Manhattan, where he joined the New York National Guard. In January 1898, he married Mabel Loretta Downs of Manhattan. They were the parents of a son, John Franklin Downs.

== Start of career ==
In August 1898, Ward volunteered for Spanish–American War service and successfully applied for a second lieutenant's commission in the 109th New York Infantry Regiment, a unit that was raised to perform state duties while other National Guard units were mobilized for federal service. In January 1899, he was assigned to the 9th Infantry Regiment, and later that year he received promotion to first lieutenant.

In 1901, Ward commanded a company during the National Guard's response to a streetcar worker's strike in Albany. In 1902, Ward was promoted to captain, and in 1907 he received promotion to major. In 1908, the 9th Infantry was transferred to the Coast Artillery Corps; Ward became an authority on Coast Artillery, which resulted in his appointment as a member of the state examining board for Coast Artillery officers.

In 1912, Ward was appointed to the staff of the 27th Division and promoted to lieutenant colonel. The division was activated for federal service in 1916 as part of the US response during the Mexican Border War. Ward was sent to Texas in advance of the division's main body, and planned and organized administrative and logistics details including bivouac sites and food and water. During the division's border service, Ward was assigned as assistant chief of staff. One Ward initiative while in Texas was organizing a weekly newspaper, The Rio Grande Rattler, and he became its managing editor. The paper was published in Mission, Texas, and by using professional journalists assigned to the division to produce high-quality stories, the Rattler developed a large subscriber base both in the Lower Rio Grande Valley and in New York state.

== Continued career ==
When the 27th Division was ordered to federal service for World War I, Ward as assigned as its adjutant and acting chief of staff during organization and training at Camp Wadsworth, South Carolina. After the organization arrived in France, he was a student at the Army School of the Line in Langres, from which he graduated with honors in September. He was then ordered to the General Staff College in Langres as a student, but declined in order to accept a command assignment. Promoted to colonel, he was assigned to command the 27th Division Trains and Military Police, which he led during the Somme offensive.

In October, Ward was assigned to command the 106th Infantry Regiment, which he led during the battles of Saint-Souplet and Arbe Guernon, which culminated at the St. Maurice River on 20 October 1918. The 27th Division was then withdrawn from the front and assigned to a rear area base for reorganization and re-equipping, and it remained there until the Armistice of November 11, 1918 ended the war. After the war, Ward remained in Europe as part of the Occupation of the Rhineland, and he returned to the United States in April 1919.

Upon returning to New York, Ward was appointed chief of staff of the New York National Guard. In early 1920, he was designated for assignment as one of the first National Guard officers to serve on the War Department General Staff, where he took part in reorganizing the Army, National Guard, and Organized Reserve Corps under the National Defense Act of 1920. In December 1921, Ward was promoted to brigadier general and assigned to command the 53rd Infantry Brigade.

== Later career ==
In 1926, Ward was appointed Adjutant General of New York. He continued to in this position until 1934, when he reached the mandatory retirement age of 64 and was succeeded by Walter G. Robinson. In 1930, he received promotion to major general.

Ward's decorations included the Army Distinguished Service Medal, Officer of the Legion of Honor (France), Croix de Guerre with palm (Belgium), Commander of the Polish Order of Polonia Restituta, Grand Officer of the Order of the Crown of Romania, and New York State Conspicuous Service Medal.

Among Ward's professional and civic memberships were the Sons of the Revolution, General Society of the War of 1812, Sons of Confederate Veterans, United Spanish War Veterans, American Legion, National Guard Association of the United States, Military Order of the World Wars, and 27th Division Association. In addition, he belonged to the New York Society of Military and Naval Officers of the World War, La Société des 40 Hommes et 8 Chevaux, Army and Navy Club of Washington, D.C., Army and Navy Club of New York City, and the Albany Club. Ward was co-author (with Frank T. Hines) of 1910's The Service of Coast Artillery, a textbook for the employment of heavy seacoast guns that was adopted by the War Department for army-wide use. In 1933, he published Between the Big Parades, a narrative of the American effort in France and Belgium during World War I.

In retirement, Ward resided in Albany. He died in Albany on 17 March 1938. Ward was buried at Arlington National Cemetery.

=== Distinguished Service Medal citation ===
The President of the United States of America, authorized by Act of Congress, July 9, 1918, takes pleasure in presenting the Army Distinguished Service Medal to Colonel (Infantry) Franklin W. Ward, United States Army, for exceptionally meritorious and distinguished services to the Government of the United States, in a duty of great responsibility during World War I, as Division Adjutant and Acting Chief of Staff of the 27th Division and as Commanding Officer of the 106th Infantry. As Commanding Officer, 106th Infantry, Colonel Ward's personal courage, determination, and thoroughness in the handling of his regiment under heavy fire during the battle of the LeSelle River in the Somme offensive of October 1918, were conspicuous.

Service: Army Rank: Colonel Division: 27th Division, American Expeditionary Forces General Orders: War Department, General Orders No. 118 (1919)

== Effective dates of promotion ==
The effective dates of Ward's promotions were:

- Private, 17 May 1888
- Corporal, 15 June 1889
- Sergeant, 21 November 1892
- First Sergeant, 18 September 1893
- Second Lieutenant, 31 August 1898
- First Lieutenant, 24 November 1899
- Captain, 3 May 1902
- Major, 28 May 1907
- Lieutenant Colonel, 1 June 1912
- Major, 28 June 1916
- Lieutenant Colonel, 31 March 1917
- Colonel, 18 September 1918
- Brigadier General, 19 December 1921
- Major General, 24 February 1930
- Major General (Retired), 4 December 1934
