= Frank Gaffney (Medal of Honor) =

United States Army Medal of Honor recipient (1883–1948)

Frank J. Gaffney
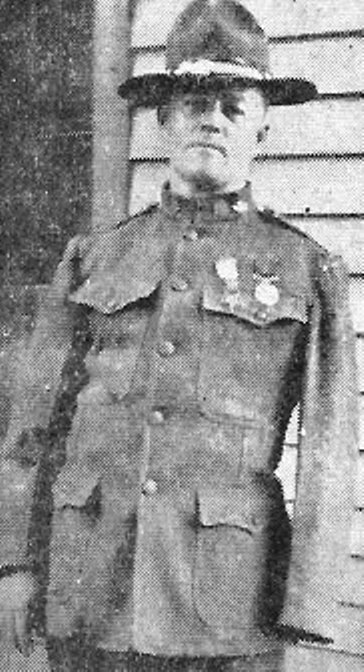
- Medal of Honor recipient
- Born: December 18, 1883; Buffalo, New York, US
- Died: May 25, 1948 (aged 64)
- Burial place: United German and French Cemetery Buffalo, New York
- Military career
- Allegiance: United States
- Branch: United States Army
- Rank: Private First Class
- Service number: 1214882
- Units: Company G, 108th Infantry, 27th Division
- Conflicts: World War I
- Awards: Medal of Honor; Purple Heart

Frank Joseph Gaffney (December 18, 1883 – May 25, 1948) was a soldier in the United States Army who received the Medal of Honor for his actions during World War I. He was considered "the second bravest man in the U. S. Army."

== Biography ==
Gaffney was born December 18, 1883, in Buffalo, New York. He died May 25, 1948, and is buried in United German and French Cemetery Buffalo, New York.

General John J. Pershing said Gaffney's deeds placed him among the top heroes of the war. Similarly, Maj. Gen. John F. O'Ryan, commanding officer of the 27th Division, paid Gaffney high honors. "No man has performed more daring exploits or exercised a bigger influence upon those around him by the gallantry of his conduct." O'Ryan also reportedly called PFC Gaffney "the human hurricane." Gaffney also received the Purple Heart, the British Distinguished Conduct Medal, the French Médaille militaire and Croix de Guerre, the Italian Croce di guerra al merito, the Montenegrin Medal for Military Bravery and the Portuguese Medalha da Cruz de Guerra, Third Class. Gaffney, who was known as "the second bravest man in the U. S. Army," later lost his left arm in fighting at St. Souplet on October 15, 1918.

== Medal of Honor citation ==
Rank and organization: Private First Class, U.S. Army, Company G, 108th Infantry, 27th Division. Place and date: At Ronssoy, France; September 29, 1918. Entered service at: Buffalo, New York. Birth: December 16, 1883; Buffalo, New York. General Orders: War Department, General Orders No. 20 (January 30, 1919).

Citation:

Private First Class Gaffney, an automatic rifleman pushing forward alone with his gun, after all the other members of his squad had been killed, discovered several Germans placing a heavy machinegun in position. He killed the crew, captured the gun, bombed several dugouts and, after killing four more of the enemy with his pistol, held the position until reinforcements came up when 80 prisoners were captured.

== Military awards ==
Gaffney's military decorations and awards include:

1st row	Medal of Honor	Purple Heart	World War I Victory Medal w/three bronze service stars to denote credit for the Somme Offensive, Ypres-Lys and Defensive Sector battle clasps.
2nd row	Distinguished Conduct Medal (Great Britain)	Médaille militaire (French Republic)	Croix de guerre 1914–1918 w/bronze palm (French Republic)
3rd row	Croce al Merito di Guerra (Italy)	Medal for Military Bravery (Kingdom of Montenegro)	Medalha da Cruz de Guerra, Third Class (Portuguese Republic)

== See also ==
- List of Medal of Honor recipients

== Bibliography ==
- Strasburg, John (2022). He Charged Alone: World War I Medal of Honor Recipient Private First Class Frank Gaffney. Lulu.com. ISBN 978-1387855926.
