= Ridgely Hunt =

American librarian (1887–1933)

Ridgely Hunt Jr. (1887–1933) was a publishing executive and professor. After a 10-year career in the book distribution and publishing industries, Hunt served as librarian of the Yale University Library in New Haven, Connecticut. He was a grandson of William H. Hunt, the Secretary of the Navy during the Garfield Presidential Administration. Hunt was also a nephew of William Henry Hunt, who served as territorial Governor of Puerto Rico and as a federal judge on the Ninth Circuit.

== Early life, education, and military experience ==
Hunt was born to Ridgely Hunt Sr. and Virginia DeLancy (Kearney) Hunt in Washington, D.C., on September 16, 1887. After graduating from Morristown School in Morristown, New Jersey, in 1905, he entered the U.S. Naval Academy in Annapolis, Maryland, as a member of the Class of 1909. Hunt later transferred to Yale University to complete his undergraduate education. Hunt participated in the Elizabethan Club, a social club, and the Sachem Club. He graduated from the Sheffield Scientific School at Yale in 1914 with a bachelor's degree in philosophy.

Between 1914 and 1918, Hunt worked at Parsons Trading Company, a paper company, and he then worked as an export manager for Arnold, Cheney, and Company. In 1918, Hunt enlisted with the 7th New York Infantry. After receiving a transfer to the 107th Infantry Regiment in the 27th Division, he served overseas with the American Expeditionary Forces in World War I. Upon earning a commission as a second lieutenant in August 1918, he served with the 101st Infantry of the 81st Division.

== Career in the book industry ==
After receiving his discharge from the U.S. Army in 1919, Hunt joined Brick Row Book Shop to manage its New York office. He later served as a sales manager for D. Appleton & Company and then Duffield & Company. In 1931, Hunt began serving as librarian of the Linonia and Brothers Library at Yale University. Hunt also held the rank of assistant professor. While working at Yale, he published the book Gardener's Friend and Other Pests with noted architect George Shepard Chappell. In 1933, Hunt received a promotion to the position of supervisor of the college libraries at Yale.

== Family ==
Hunt married Julia deForest Cheney in 1915. They had four children together. Hunt's child Nancy (born Ridgely Hunt III) worked as a journalist with The Chicago Tribune.
