= 106th Infantry Regiment (United States) =

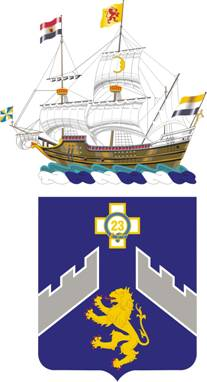
- Coat of arms of the former 23rd New York/106th Infantry
- Country: United States of America
- Branch: Army National Guard
- Type: Infantry regiment
- Mottos: Fidelis et Constans (Faithful and Constant)
- Engagements: World War II; Battle of Eniwetok; Battle of Saipan; Battle of Okinawa

Insignia
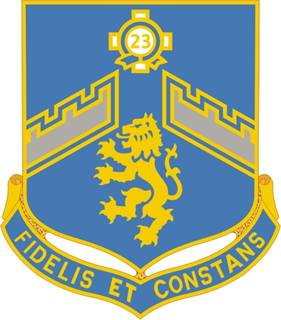
- Distinctive unit insignia

The 106th Infantry Regiment was the designation of two separate New York Army National Guard regiments. The first is currently active as the 106th Regiment (Regional Training Institute), and the second is active as a result of consolidation with the 101st Cavalry Regiment.

== First 106th Infantry ==
=== American Civil War and early 20th century ===
The first unit designated "106th Infantry Regiment" was constituted on 20 January 1862 as the 23rd Infantry and organized on 14 July 1862 from newly-organized companies and Company G, 13th Regiment, known as the "Brooklyn City Guard Reserve." The latter unit was first organized as an artillery company attached to the 13th Regiment, New York State Militia, in 1828. It was transferred to the "Jefferson Guards" Battalion which was later reorganized as the 38th Artillery, 6th Brigade. It was reorganized as the "Brooklyn City Guards" on 23 August 1842, and redesignated Company G, 13th Regiment, "Relief Guard," on 1 May 1861 and later redesignated "Brooklyn City Guard Reserve" in June 1861 and reorganized as Company G, 23rd Infantry. The 23rd Regiment was mustered into federal service in the Union Army on 18-25 June 1863, assigned to 1st Division, VI Corps, Department of the Susquehanna. It participated in quelling the New York City draft riots from 13-16 July 1863 before being mustered out on 22 July 1863 and resuming state status. It was mustered into federal service on 1 July 1916 for service in the Pancho Villa Expedition, and stationed at Pharr, Texas, being mustered out on 17 January 1917.

=== World War I ===
The 27th Division of the New York National Guard was reorganized in November 1917 under General John J. Pershing’s preferred type of "square division." It had two infantry brigades (each with two infantry regiments), along with an artillery brigade, machine gun battalions, and headquarters and support units. During the reorganization, the 23rd New York Infantry Regiment was converted into the 106th Infantry Regiment, under the command of Col. Franklin W. Ward, and was assigned to the 53rd Infantry Brigade (now the 53rd Troop Command) alongside the 105th Infantry Regiment (former 2nd New York).

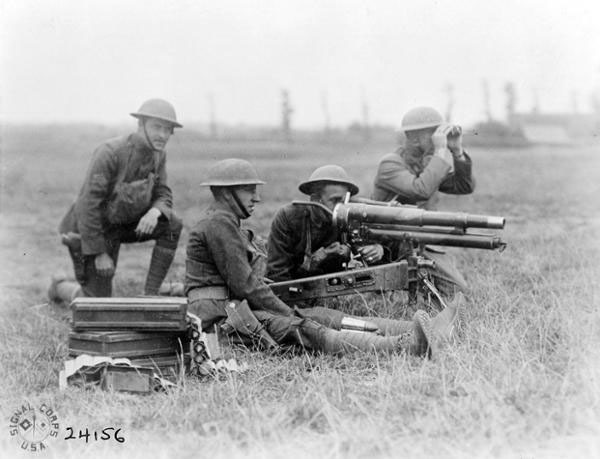
New York National Guard doughboys of the 27th Division's 106th Infantry Regiment's cannon platoon training with the 37 millimeter M1916 infantry support cannon, the American version of a French-made light infantry cannon, near Abeele, Belgium, August 20, 1918.

When the regiment arrived in France, it had a strength of 3,003 officers and enlisted men, and it was moved into the front lines on 25 June 1918. The regiment relieved elements of the British 6th Division along the East Poperinghe Line in Belgium, where it remained with the other elements of the 27th Division. On 31 August 1918, the Ypres-Lys Offensive began, and the 106th Regiment was engaged in the reconnaissance efforts prior to the main battle. Alongside the 53rd Brigade and the rest of the 27th Division, the 106th attacked German position in the Second Battle of the Somme from 24 September to 21 October 1918. This offensive proved to be the decisive action which broke the Hindenburg Line.

The desperate fighting is clearly demonstrated by the actions of Lieutenant Colonel J. Leslie Kincaid, the Judge Advocate of the division staff. From 25 to 28 September, Kincaid took command of a leaderless battalion of the 106th Infantry and managed to hold off an enemy counterattack by organizing every man in the battalion including runners, cooks, signalmen, etc., in the defense; he even personally manned a Lewis gun during the action. He was awarded the British Distinguished Service Order. On 21 October 1918, the division was relieved from front line duty. By the end of its combat action in World War I, the 106th Infantry Regiment had suffered 1,955 casualties, including 1,496 wounded, 376 killed, and 83 who later died of their wounds.

=== Interwar period ===
The 106th Infantry arrived at the port of New York on 6 March 1919 on the USS Leviathan and was demobilized 2 April 1919 at Camp Upton, New York. It was reconstituted in the National Guard on 30 December 1920, assigned to the 27th Division, and allotted to the state of New York. It was reorganized by redesignation of the 23rd Infantry, New York National Guard (organized 1919–20; headquarters organized 31 March 1920 and federally recognized at Troy, New York) as the 106th Infantry on 1 June 1921. It conducted a regimental review at Brooklyn for Queen Marie of Romania on 23 October 1926. It conducted annual summer training most years at Camp Smith, Peekskill, New York, 1921–38.

==== Reorganization ====
On 1 September 1940, the Headquarters and Headquarters Detachment 3rd Battalion, Service Company, and Companies C, G, and L were converted and redesignated as the 101st Military Police Battalion, while the remainder of the regiment was converted and redesignated as the 186th Field Artillery Regiment.

=== World War II ===
The 186th Field Artillery Regiment was broken up and redesignated on 8 February 1943. The Headquarters and Headquarters Battery became the Headquarters and Headquarters Battery, 186th Field Artillery Group, the 1st Battalion the 186th Field Artillery Battalion, and the 2nd Battalion the 953rd Field Artillery Battalion. The Headquarters and Headquarters Battery, 186th Field Artillery Group, was inactivated on 21 October 1943 at Fort Indiantown Gap, Pennsylvania, the 186th Field Artillery Battalion on 14 December 1945 at Camp Patrick Henry, Virginia, and the 953rd Field Artillery Battalion on 22 December 1945 at Camp Myles Standish, Massachusetts. The 101st Military Police Battalion was inactivated on 15 June 1946 in Florence, Italy.

=== Cold War ===
The 106th Infantry was organized and federally recognized on 25 March 1947 at Brooklyn, by conversion, reorganization, consolidation, and redesignation of the 186th Field Artillery Group, 186th and 953rd Field Artillery Battalion, and 101st Military Police Battalion.

=== Modern ===
In 2003, the 106th Infantry was organized into the 106th Regiment (Regional Training Institute).

== Second 106th Infantry ==
=== American Civil War and early 20th century ===
The second unit designated "106th Infantry Regiment" was constituted in the New York State Militia as the 10th Infantry Regiment and organized on 29 December 1860. On 21 November 1862, it was mustered into active federal service in the Union Army as the 177th New York Infantry Regiment and was mustered out on 10 September 1863, resuming its state status. In 1881, the unit was reduced to a battalion and designated the 10th Battalion. On 29 May 1898, it was mustered into federal service for the Spanish–American War, consolidated with other units, and redesignated the 1st New York Volunteer Infantry. The regiment served at various forts in Hawaii and the continental United States before being mustered out of service from 20-26 February 1899. On 1 May 1905, the 10th Battalion was expanded to a regiment. The 10th New York reported for duty during the Pancho Villa Expedition, but was never officially mustered into federal service and returned to home stations.

=== World War I ===
After American entry into World War I in April 1917, the 10th New York was mustered into federal service on 15-16 July 1917 and was drafted into federal service on 5 August 1917. It was reorganized as the 51st Pioneer Infantry on 4 January 1918.

=== Interwar period ===
The 51st Pioneer Infantry arrived at the port of New York on 4 July 1919 on the USS Wilhelmina and was demobilized on 8 July 1919 at Camp Upton, New York. It was reorganized from 28 March–17 June 1921 by consolidation with, and redesignation as, the 10th Infantry, New York National Guard. The regimental headquarters was federally recognized on 22 May 1922 at Albany, New York. The regiment was attached to the 27th Division's 54th Infantry Brigade on 15 September 1923 for command, control, and administration, and was relieved from attachment to the 54th Infantry Brigade on 26 January 1927 and assigned to the separate 93rd Infantry Brigade. The 2nd Battalion was called up to perform flood relief work near Binghamton, New York, 18–20 March 1936. The regiment conducted annual summer training most years at Camp Smith, 1921–39.

As nondivisional infantry brigades did not factor into US mobilization plans in 1940, the unit was relieved from the brigade on 1 June 1940, and was assigned to the 27th Division's 53rd Infantry Brigade in place of the converted first 106th Infantry on 1 September 1940. The 10th New York was ordered into federal service on 15 October 1940. The regiment was made up of recruits from Upstate New York, divided into 12 companies, with 4 companies per battalion. Companies A, B, C, and D were recruited from Albany. Companies E and H came from Binghamton. Companies F, G, I, and K were recruited from Walton, Oneonta, Mohawk, and Oneida respectively and Companies L and M were filled with soldiers from Utica. Additional regimental troops were drawn from Catskill, Hudson, and Rome. The regiment moved to Fort McClellan, Alabama on 23 October. On 11 December 1940, the 10th New York was redesignated the 106th Infantry.

=== World War II ===
Due to the restructuring of the United States Army in the early 1940s, the square division concept gave way to the triangular division concept (where three infantry regiments were supported by more versatile elements rather than relying solely on infantry firepower), the 108th Infantry Regiment was reassigned from the 27th Infantry Division to the 40th Infantry Division, and the 106th was itself sent to Hawaii independent of the rest of the division on 10 March 1942. It was attached to the V Amphibious Corps on 14 December 1943.

==== Majuro and Eniwetok ====
The 2nd Battalion (2-106), occupied Majuro Atoll on 1 February 1944, against no resistance, and remained there until it was sent to Oahu for training on 5 March 1944. The 1st and 3rd Battalions (1-106 and 3–106) were sent to capture the island of Eniwetok on 19 February 1944. 1-106 made a beach assault against weak Japanese resistance, but became bogged down inland where enemy resistance increased in intensity. 3–106, alongside the 22nd Marine Regiment, arrived to reinforce 1-106 and the island was secured on 21 February.

==== Saipan ====
The regiment consolidated its three battalions in Hawaii on 13 April 1944, and landed on Saipan on 20 June 1944, five days after the initial invasion. Here the 106th Infantry Regiment rejoined the rest of its parent unit, the 27th Infantry Division, which had already been fighting on Saipan. The 106th fought along rough jungle terrain at the base of Mount Tapotchau, which they dubbed "Purple Heart Ridge" and "Death Valley." After many of the Japanese strongpoints had been subdued, the defenders launched a second last ditch Banzai charge, which the 106th was active in defeating. After departing the island on 4 September 1944, the 106th enjoyed some R&R on Espiritu Santo.

==== Okinawa ====
The regiment departed Espirtu Santo for Okinawa on 20 March 1945, and participated alongside the XXIV Corps general attack on the island. From 11 April to 16 April, the 106th was under the control of the 96th Infantry Division but was returned to the 27th Division's command for the attack on Rotation Ridge. Working together with the 105th Infantry Regiment, they fought to capture a hill called The Pinnacle, a tall spire of rock, where the Japanese had prepared an intricate defense. The last action of the 106th Infantry's World War II chronicle occurred when 1-106 repelled a Banzai charge west of the Pinnacle on 22 April 1945. Following the relief of the division, 2-106 was sent to occupy the island of Ie Shima. When the war ended, the 106th arrived in Japan for occupation duty on 12 September 1945. It was eventually inactivated on 31 December 1945.

=== Cold War ===
The regiment was relieved on 17 May 1947 from the 27th Infantry Division, and broken up into antiaircraft and infantry units. The 1st Battalion became the 7th Antiaircraft Artillery Automatic Weapons Battalion, the 2nd Battalion the 2nd Battalion, 108th Infantry Regiment, and the 3rd Battalion the 336th Antiaircraft Artillery Gun Battalion; at this point, the latter two units maintain separate lineages.

The 7th Antiaircraft Artillery Automatic Weapons Battalion, with headquarters at Albany, New York. was assigned as an organic element of the 27th Infantry Division. It was redesignated on 1 May 1950 as the 106th Antiaircraft Artillery Automatic Weapons Battalion, on 15 October 1952 as the 127th Antiaircraft Artillery Automatic Weapons Battalion, and on 1 October 1953 as the 127th Artillery Battalion. On 16 March 1959, the battalion was reorganized as the 210th Artillery, a parent regiment under the United States Army Combat Arms Regimental System, to consist of the 1st Battalion. It was converted on 1 May 1960 to the 210th Armor, to consist of the 1st Medium Tank Battalion, an element of the 27th Armored Division. On 20 October 1986, it was withdrawn from the Combat Arms Regimental System and reorganized under the United States Army Regimental System.

=== Modern ===
On 1 September 1993, the 1st Battalion, 210th Armor, was consolidated with the 101st Cavalry Regiment, keeping the designation of 101st Cavalry.

== Notable members ==
- Monk Eastman New York mobster
