= William T. Carneal =

- William T. Carneal
- Born: April 25, 1920; Paducah, Kentucky
- Died: July 7, 1944 (aged 24); Saipan
- Burial place: Paducah, Kentucky
- Military career
- Allegiance: United States of America
- Branch: United States Army
- Service years: 1941–1944
- Rank: Private First Class
- Nickname: Teetum
- Units: 105th Infantry Regiment, 27th Infantry Division
- Conflicts: World War II; Battle of Saipan
- Awards: Bronze Star; Purple Heart; Good Conduct Medal; American Defense Service Medal; Asian-Pacific campaign medal Two Bronze Service Stars; World War II Victory Medal; Combat Infantryman Badge

William T. Carneal (April 25, 1920 – July 7, 1944) was a United States Army soldier who was killed on Saipan, but whose remains were not found until 69 years after his death in March 2013 by Kuentai, a non-profit organization that searches for Japanese soldiers that died during World War II.

== Biography ==
Carneal's parents were Plummer Thurman Carneal and Johnnie Ella Hite Carneal. He was the youngest of 10 children. His father died when he was 19 months old and his mother died when he was seven years old. After his parents died, he was raised by his sister Ruth Carneal Anderson and her husband, L.O. Anderson. He attended Heath High School and graduated in 1939. After graduating from high school, he enlisted in the United States Army on October 13, 1941. He received basic training at Fort Wolters and in January 1942, he was sent to Hawaii.

== Death and discovery ==
In June 1944, the 27th Infantry Division landed on Saipan as part of the Allied effort to take the Mariana Islands. On July 7, Carneal's 105th Infantry Regiment took a heavy attack from the Japanese defending Saipan. The 105th Infantry Regiment took over 900 casualties including Carneal. However, his body was not found and he was declared missing in action.

Carlton Carneal, William Carneal's nephew, told NPR that his uncle had a pact with three friends, so that if anything happened to one of them, the remaining friends would tell the families of the others what had happened. Because of this, the Carneal family knew what had happened to William Carneal. According to Carlton Carneal, while William Carneal was firing his gun at attacking Japanese soldiers, a Japanese soldier jumped into his foxhole from behind and detonated a hand grenade, killing both of them.

In March 2013, Kuentai, a Japanese nonprofit organization that searches for bodies of Japanese soldiers found his remains under more than 3 feet (0.91 m) of clay along with the remains of four other American soldiers. The group also found his dog tags, belt buckle, poncho, a pocket watch, loose change, and his 1939 class ring. Even though these artifacts were found with the remains, the United States Army did not declare them as Carneal's until DNA testing confirmed his identity on December 4, 2013. This DNA testing was conducted using one of the letters Carneal had sealed with his saliva still in the possession of his family.

== Honored 70 years later ==
Memorial services were held on April 25, 2014, on what would have been his 94th birthday. Representatives from Japan including members of the organization that found his remains attended the memorial services as well as representatives of Kentucky Governor Steve Beshear and Senator Mitch McConnell's offices. Governor Steve Beshear ordered that flags should be lowered to half-staff from sunrise to sunset in Kentucky on April 25, 2014, in honor of PFC William T. Carneal. He was laid to rest in Paducah, Kentucky, rather than Arlington National Cemetery, because his surviving family wanted to have him buried next to the sister who raised him after his parents died. Carneal was remembered in the Congressional Record.

== See also ==
- Bernard Gavrin
- Defense Prisoner of War/Missing Personnel Office
- Lists of solved missing person cases
