= John F. O'Ryan =

American lawyer and military official (1874–1961)

John Francis O'Ryan
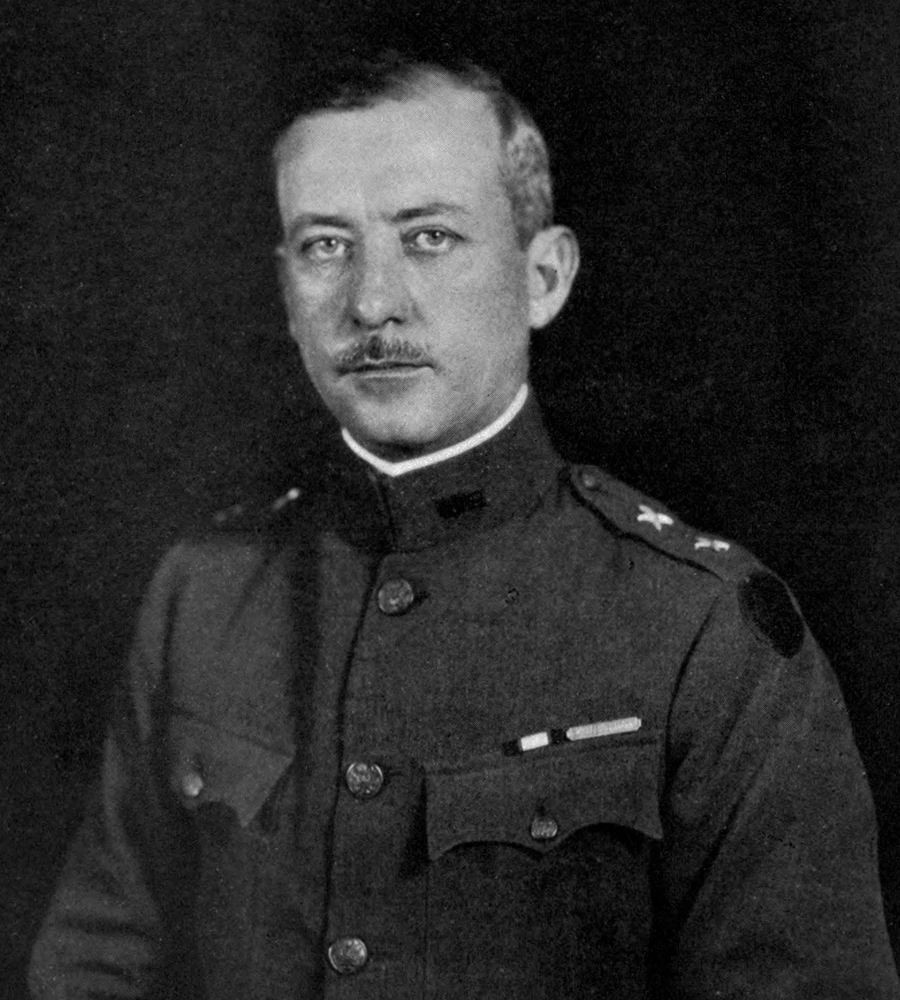
- John F. O'Ryan, pictured here when he was commander of the 27th Division during World War I.
- Born: August 21, 1874; Manhattan, New York City, U.S.
- Died: January 29, 1961 (aged 86); South Salem, New York, U.S.
- Burial place: Arlington National Cemetery, Virginia, United States
- Military career
- Allegiance: United States
- Branch: United States Army
- Service years: 1898–1920
- Rank: Major General
- Service number: 0-135904
- Commands: New York National Guard; 27th Division
- Conflicts: Villa Expedition; World War I; World War II
- Awards: Army Distinguished Service Medal
- Other work: Member, New York State Transit Commission; Executive, Pan American Airways and Colonial Airlines; New York City Police Commissioner; New York State Civil Defense Director

John Francis O'Ryan (August 21, 1874 – January 29, 1961) was an American attorney, politician, government official and military officer. He served as commander of the 27th Division during World War I. He later served as a member of the New York State Transit Commission and as New York City Police Commissioner. During World War II he was New York State Civil Defense Director.

== Early career ==
John Francis O'Ryan was born in New York City on August 21, 1874. His father Francis O'Ryan was an Irish immigrant who taught classics at Seton Hall College. He had a sister named Anna Wynne O'Ryan who was a librettist. He attended the public schools of New York City, City College of New York and the law program of New York University, and became an attorney in 1898. He enlisted in the New York National Guard while still a college student and received his commission as a Second Lieutenant in 1900.

In 1912 O'Ryan was appointed Major General and commander of the New York National Guard. He graduated from the Army War College in 1914 and served in the 1916 Villa Expedition.

In 1914 O'Ryan received his law degree from New York University School of Law as a member of the class of 1896.

== World War I ==
27th Infantry Division shoulder sleeve insignia. The stars depict the Orion constellation, a pun on O'Ryan's surname. The "O" on the outside edge stands for "O'Ryan," and the letters inside form the abbreviation "NYD" for "New York Division."

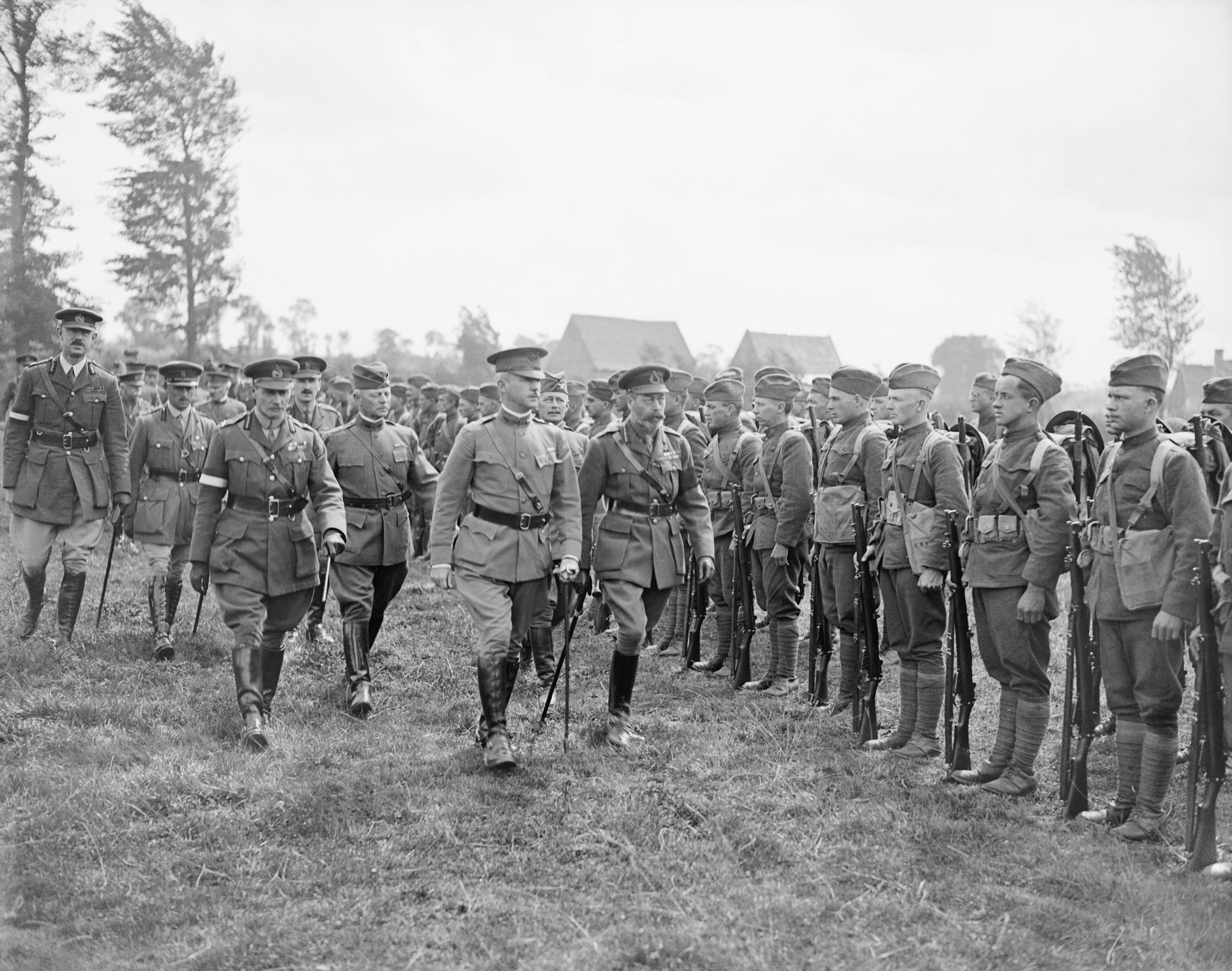
British King George V and Major General John F. O'Ryan (center), commanding the 27th Division, inspecting doughboys of Company L, 108th Infantry, 27th Division, August 6, 1918.

Following the American entry into World War I in April 1917, O'Ryan's division was soon reorganized as the 27th Division, with Colonel Stanley H. Ford, a future lieutenant general, as its chief of staff. The next few months for the division and its Commanding General (CG) were devoted to training towards eventual overseas service.

By May 1918 the division, now consisting of over 24,000 officers and men, had progressed enough in its training and was deemed worthy to be sent abroad. It did so that month, arriving on the Western Front between May and June. Aged just 43, he was the youngest officer to command a division in the U.S. Army during World War I, as well as the only National Guard officer to command a division throughout the war.

O'Ryan's 27th Division—often nicknamed O'Ryan's roughnecks—trained in the Flanders region of Belgium with the British Expeditionary Force (BEF), one of only two American divisions (the other being the 30th "Old Hickory" Division which, together with the 27th, formed part of Major General George Read's U.S. II Corps) to do so. The 27th saw its first action in July 1918 in the Ypres Salient and then at the Mont Kemmel sector. It was later assigned to General Sir Henry Rawlinson's British Fourth Army, with which it soon found itself engaged in very heavy and bloody fighting in an attempt to break through the Hindenburg Line, in particular during the battle of St Quentin Canal, fought in late September and early October 1918. The division was relieved soon after and saw no further heavy fighting, with the war coming to an end on November 11.

The 27th Division returned home in early 1919 and was demobilized in April.

After returning to the United States O'Ryan was a founder of the American Legion.

== Post-World War I ==
From 1922 to 1926 he was a member of the New York State Transit Commission. In 1926 he became prominent in the development of commercial aviation as a partner in Pan American Airways, later becoming President of Colonial Airlines.

In 1933 O'Ryan led parades protesting the treatment of Jews in Germany and advocating for the U.S. government to intervene on their behalf.

In 1934 he was a Republican candidate for Mayor of New York, but withdrew in favor of Fiorello LaGuardia. When LaGuardia won, O'Ryan accepted appointment as his Police Commissioner. O'Ryan served for most of 1935 before resigning over disagreement with LaGuardia's non-intervention stance on labor-management disputes.

== World War II ==
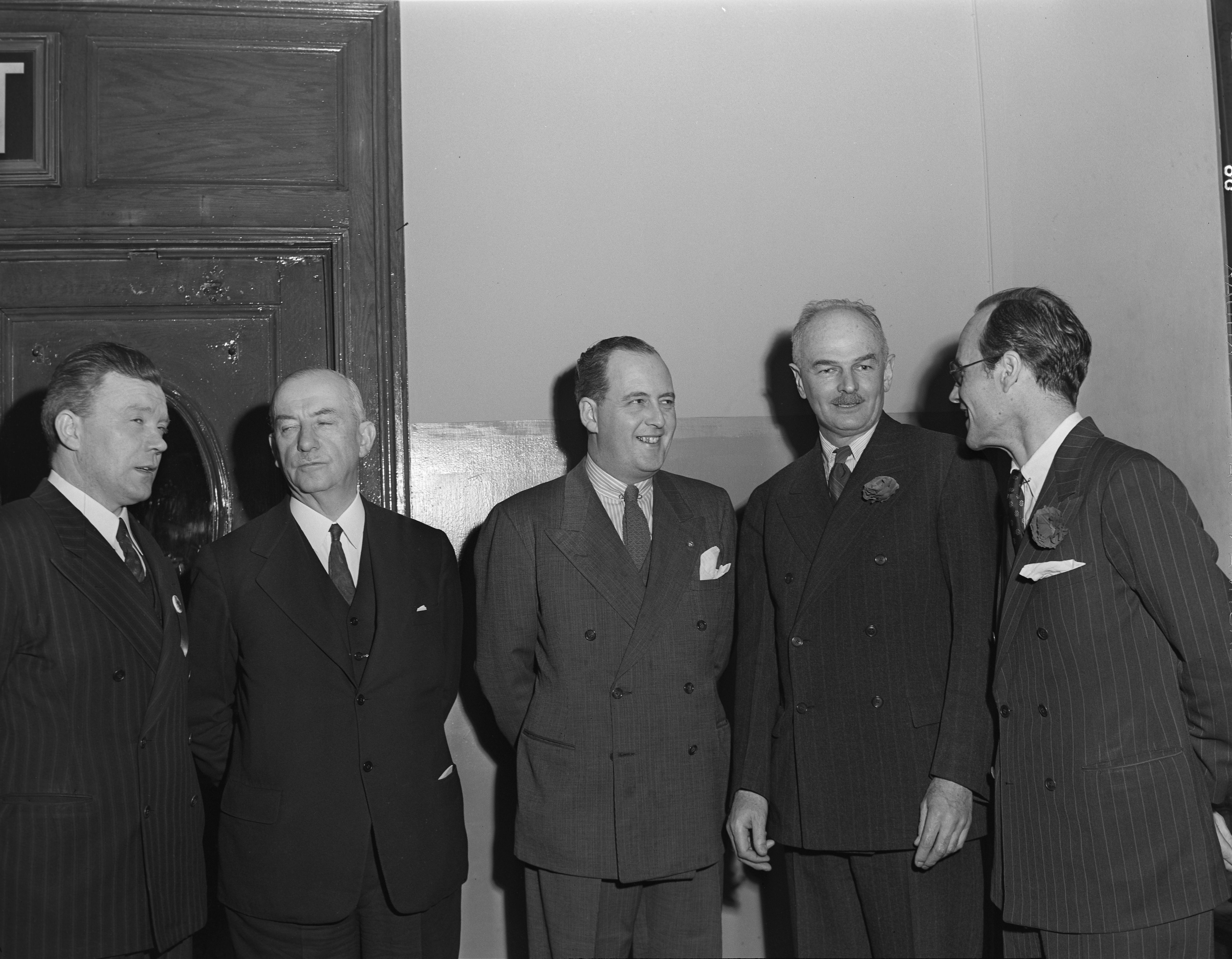
O'Ryan (second from left) with New York City Councilman Eugene P. Connolly (center) and other Irish American leaders at a Saint Patrick's Day rally in Manhattan, New York, March 17, 1942

In 1940 O'Ryan led a study group in Japan and occupied China, with the knowledge of President Franklin D. Roosevelt. The committee, which included economists Warren S. Hunsberger and Simon N. Whitney, were invited by the Japanese Economic Federation and the New York investment firm of Eastman Dillon and Company to research ways to improve trade relations between Japan and the U.S. so that Japan might become a U.S. ally. While in Japan, O'Ryan learned that the Japanese government planned to sign the Tripartite Pact with Fascist Italy and Nazi Germany. O'Ryan and his group submitted their report to the Japanese Economic Federation and returned home.

In 1940, O'Ryan established the Fighting Funds for Finland, Inc., a group that sent aid to Finland during the Winter War.

During the war he served as New York State's Civil Defense Director and was also an unofficial advisor to Secretary of War Henry L. Stimson. In 1945 he was elected National Commander of the Military Order of Foreign Wars and, on December 7, 1945, visited President Truman at the White House to pay his respects.

== Awards ==
O'Ryan's awards included the Distinguished Service Medal and the Victory Medal. The citation to his Army DSM reads:

The President of the United States of America, authorized by Act of Congress, July 9, 1918, takes pleasure in presenting the Army Distinguished Service Medal to Major General John F. O'Ryan, United States Army, for exceptionally meritorious and distinguished services to the Government of the United States, in a duty of great responsibility during World War I. As Commander of the 27th Division in its successful operations with the British in France in the Autumn of 1918, General O'Ryan displayed qualities of skill and aggressiveness which mark him as a leader of ability. In the breach of the Hindenburg Line between St. Quentin and Cambrai the name of his division is linked with the British in adding new laurels to the allied forces in France.

In addition to these, he also received the following foreign decorations: British Order of St. Michael and St. George (Knight Commander); British Royal Victorian Order (Commander); French Legion of Honor (Commander); French Croix de Guerre with Palm; Belgian Order of Leopold (Commander); Belgian Croix de Guerre with Palm; and Italian Order of Saints Maurice and Lazarus.

In 1919 O'Ryan received an honorary Doctor of Laws (LL.D.) from New York University.

== Death and burial ==
General O'Ryan died in South Salem, New York on January 29, 1961. He was buried at Arlington National Cemetery, Section 2, Site E-17 LH.

== Legacy ==
In 1952 a New York National Guard training area in Wethersfield, New York was dedicated in his honor, Camp O'Ryan. It had been used as a training site beginning in 1949, and remained in use until 1974. It was returned to use in 1989, and was inactivated in 1994.

== Bibliography ==
- Bullard, Robert Lee (2013). Fighting Generals: Illustrated Biographical Sketches of Seven Major Generals in World War I. Literary Licensing. ISBN 9781258861193.
- Coffman, Edward M. (1998). The War to End All Wars: The American Military Experience in World War. University Press of Kentucky. ISBN 978-0-8131-0955-8.
- Cooke, James J. (1997). Pershing and his Generals: Command and Staff in the AEF. Praeger Publishers. ISBN 0-275-95363-7.
- Davis, Henry Blaine Jr. (1998). Generals in Khaki. Raleigh, North Carolina: Pentland Press. ISBN 1571970886. OCLC 40298151.
- Venzon, Anne Cipriano (2013). The United States in the First World War: an Encyclopedia. Hoboken, NJ: Taylor and Francis. ISBN 978-1-135-68453-2. OCLC 865332376.
- Yockelson, Mitchell (2008). Borrowed Soldiers: Americans under British Command, 1918. Norman, OK: University of Oklahoma Press. ISBN 9780806153490.

Military offices
Preceded by New post	Commanding General 27th Division; 1917–1918	Succeeded by Post deactivated
Police appointments
Preceded by James S. Bolan	NYPD Commissioner; 1934	Succeeded by Lewis Joseph Valentine
