= Auburn =

Auburn may refer to:

== Places ==
=== Australia ===
- Auburn, New South Wales
- City of Auburn, the local government area
- Electoral district of Auburn
- Auburn, Queensland, a locality in the Western Downs Region
- Auburn, South Australia
- Auburn, Tasmania
- Auburn, Victoria
  - Auburn railway station, Melbourne

=== United States ===
- Auburn, Alabama, the seventh-largest city in Alabama, home to Auburn University
- Auburn, California, a city
- Auburn, Colorado, an unincorporated community
- Auburn, Georgia, a city
- Auburn, Illinois, a city
- Auburn, Indiana, a city
- Auburn, Iowa, a city
- Auburn, Kansas, a city
- Auburn, Kentucky, a city
- Auburn, Maine, a city
- Auburn House (Towson, Maryland), a historic home located on the grounds of Towson University
- Auburn, Massachusetts, a town
- Auburn, Michigan, a city
- Auburn, Mississippi, an unincorporated community
- Auburn (Natchez, Mississippi), a mansion in Duncan Park and a U.S. National Historic Landmark
- Auburn, Missouri, an unincorporated community
- Auburn, Nebraska, a city
- Auburn, New Hampshire, a town
- Auburn, New Jersey, a census-designated place
- Auburn, New York, a city
- Auburn, North Carolina, an unincorporated community
- Auburn, North Dakota, a census-designated place
- Auburn, Oregon, a ghost town
- Auburn, Pennsylvania, a borough
- Auburn, Rhode Island, a neighborhood of Cranston, Rhode Island
- Auburn, Texas, an unincorporated community
- Auburn (Bowling Green, Virginia), listed on the National Register
- Auburn (Brandy Station, Virginia), listed on the National Register
- Auburn, Washington, a city
- Auburn, West Virginia, a town
- Auburn, Chippewa County, Wisconsin, a town
- Auburn, Fond du Lac County, Wisconsin, a town
- Auburn, Wyoming, a census-designated place

=== Elsewhere ===
- Auburn, County Westmeath, a townland in Kilkenny West civil parish, County Westmeath, Ireland
- Auburn, East Riding of Yorkshire, England
- Auburn, Nova Scotia
- Auburn, Ontario

== Military ==
- First Battle of Auburn, fought on October 13, 1863, between Union infantry and Confederate cavalry
- Second Battle of Auburn, fought on October 14, 1863, in Fauquier County, Virginia
- USS Auburn, two ships of the United States Navy

== Organizations ==
- Auburn Automobile, a brand name of American automobiles made in Auburn, Indiana
- Auburn Correctional Facility, a state prison in Auburn, New York
- Auburn Motor Chassis Company, a manufacturer of automobiles and panel vans in Auburn, Indiana
- Auburn Rubber Company, former rubber product manufacturer, especially toy vehicles
- Auburn University, a university in Auburn, Alabama
  - Auburn Tigers, the athletic program of Auburn University

== People ==
- Auburn (singer) (born 1990), American urban pop artist
- Alex Auburn, lead guitarist of Canadian death metal band Cryptopsy
- Bert Auburn, American football player
- David Auburn (born 1969), American playwright
- Auburn Calloway, the criminal FedEx employee onboard Federal Express Flight 705.

== Other uses ==
- Auburn hair, a reddish-brown hair color
- Auburn system, a penal method
- Auburn turkey, a breed of domestic turkey

== See also ==
- Auburn Historic District (disambiguation)
- Auburn metropolitan area (disambiguation)
- Auburn School (disambiguation)
- Auburn Township (disambiguation)
- Auburndale (disambiguation)
- Mount Auburn (disambiguation)
