= Auburn House =

Auburn House may refer to:

- Auburn House (Towson, Maryland), listed on the National Register of Historic Places (NRHP)
- Auburn (Natchez, Mississippi), mansion, NRHP-listed
- Auburn (Bowling Green, Virginia), house, NRHP-listed
- Auburn (Brandy Station, Virginia), house and farm, NRHP-listed
- Auburn House Publishing, based in Dover, Massachusetts, later an imprint of Greenwood Publishing Group

== See also ==
- Auburn (disambiguation)
