= Auburn School =

Auburn School may refer to:

- Auburn High School (disambiguation)
- Auburn Middle School (disambiguation)
- Auburn City Schools, a school district in Auburn, Alabama
- Auburn School Department, a school district in Auburn, Maine
- Auburn School District, a school district in King County, Washington
- Auburn Union Elementary School District, a school district in Placer County, California
- Auburn Enlarged City School District, a school district in Auburn, New York

== See also ==
- Auburn (disambiguation)
