= Auburn High School =

Auburn High School may refer to:

== In Australia ==
- Auburn Girls High School, Auburn, New South Wales
- Auburn High School (Victoria), East Hawthorn, Melbourne, Australia

== In Canada ==
- Auburn Drive High School, Westphal, Nova Scotia

== In the United States ==
- Auburn High School (Alabama), Auburn, Alabama
- Auburn High School (Auburn, Illinois), Auburn, Illinois
- Auburn High School (Rockford, Illinois), Rockford, Illinois
- Auburn High School (Indiana), Auburn, Indiana
- Auburn High School (Massachusetts), Auburn, Massachusetts
- Auburn High School (Nebraska), Auburn, Nebraska
- Auburn High School (New York), Auburn, New York
- Auburn High School (Virginia), Riner, Virginia
- Auburn Senior High School, Auburn, Washington
- Auburn Junior High School, Auburn, New York

== See also ==
- Auburn Middle School (disambiguation)
- Auburn School (disambiguation)
