= Auburn micropolitan area =

The Auburn micropolitan area may refer to:

- The Auburn, Indiana micropolitan area, United States
- The Auburn, New York micropolitan area, United States

== See also ==
- Auburn metropolitan area (disambiguation)
- Auburn (disambiguation)
