= Auburn Middle School =

Auburn Middle School may refer to:

- Auburn Middle School in Auburn School Department, Maine, United States
- Auburn Middle School in Riner, Virginia, United States
- Auburn Middle School in Auburn, Massachusetts, United States

== See also ==
- Auburn High School (disambiguation)
- Auburn School (disambiguation)
