= Auburn Historic District =

Auburn Historic District may refer to:

in the United States

(by state)

- Auburn University Historic District, Auburn, AL, listed on the NRHP in Alabama
- Old Auburn Historic District, Auburn, CA, listed on the NRHP in California
- Auburn Mills Historic District, Yorklyn, DE, listed on the NRHP in Delaware
- Sweet Auburn Historic District, Atlanta, GA, listed on the NRHP in Georgia
- Auburn Historic District (Auburn, Georgia), listed on the NRHP in Georgia
- Downtown Auburn Historic District, Auburn, IN, listed on the NRHP in Indiana
- Auburn Historic District (Auburn, Kentucky), listed on the NRHP in Kentucky
- Auburn Commercial Historic District, Auburn, Maine
- Auburn-Harpswell Association Historic District, South Harpswell, ME, listed on the NRHP in Maine
- Auburn Historic District (Auburn, Nebraska)
- Mount Auburn Historic District, Cincinnati, OH, listed on the NRHP in Ohio

== See also ==
- Auburn (disambiguation)
