= Wrights Fork, Virginia =

Unincorporated community in Virginia, United States

Coordinates: 37°57′16″N 77°18′39″W

Wrights Fork is an unincorporated community in Caroline County, in the U.S. state of Virginia. The community is the home of NRHP-listed Green Falls home.
