= Elizabeth "Betty" Lacey =

American educator and community advocate 2012

Elizabeth Martin Lacey
- Born: Boston, Massachusetts, U.S.
- Died: August 11, 2012; Ithaca, New York, U.S.
- Education: Boston University; Ithaca College
- Known for: Women's athletics (coaching and advocacy)

Elizabeth Lacey (died August 11, 2012) was a long-time educator and community advocate. She served as a physical education instructor at Auburn High School (New York) from 1956 until 1981 where she was highly active in raising public awareness and support for women's athletics and lifetime recreational activities. During her tenure at the school (initially East High and then Auburn High), Lacey coached all of the girl's major athletic teams that included a record-setting four consecutive New York State girls field hockey Section III championship titles.

During her tenure as field hockey coach, Lacey's teams compiled an impressive record of 190 wins, 3 losses, and 6 ties. Her teams were undefeated over four consecutive seasons, earning 71 victories which ranks among the longest winning streaks in the nation for that sport.

While coaching at Auburn High, Lacey's teams won seven New York State Section III championships, four in field hockey, and one each in basketball, track, and volleyball. Her other varsity coaching assignments included soccer, softball, and tennis. In 2008, the Auburn school district honored Mrs. Lacey by naming the athletic field after her, joining Jerome “Brud” Holland, the highly decorated African-American athlete, educator, and diplomat as the only persons so honored by the Auburn school district.

While teaching and coaching at Auburn, Lacey also was honored as the first woman inducted into the New York State Coaches Hall of Fame, joining the legendary Syracuse University football coach Floyd “Ben” Schwartzwalder for that year's inductees.

Lacey died in Ithaca, New York on August 11, 2012.

== Background ==
A graduate of Sargent College at Boston University (1944), Lacey was recognized with a Boston University Merit Award for outstanding achievement in her profession. She also earned a graduate degree from Ithaca College (1964).

Mrs. Lacey's career spanned both sides of the Title IX era, which ushered in equality in women's athletic opportunities. In pre-Title IX years, she organized activities and intramurals to involve young women in sports. Her viewpoint was that physical education is part of the total education curriculum and, when properly implemented, enriches life.

After graduation from Boston University, she began her teaching career at Sherwood Central High School in Sherwood, New York where, from 1944 to 1946, she held a unique position as physical education instructor and coach of both boys and girls sports. While at Sherwood, she coached men's football, basketball, and baseball, a ground breaking coaching assignment for a woman. Lacey officiated women's university volleyball and basketball games at institutions across upstate New York and the northeast.

In 1956, Lacey founded the Sherwood-Aurora Recreation Association that developed a swimming and recreational program for the youth of the local southern Cayuga County area that focused on lifetime sports. For over 40 years, she served as director of the program utilizing the physical facilities of the Sherwood Central School, Wells College in nearby Aurora, and the Southern Cayuga High School. The program offered a number of recreational programs for children of all ages.

== Awards and honors ==
- First Women inducted into the New York State Coaches Hall of Fame
- Participant at the National Institutes for Olympic Development at Indiana University
- Member of the New York State Council of Women's Officials
- Founder of the Finger Lakes Board of Officials,
- Chairman of New York State Women's Basketball
- Ithaca College Athletic Hall of Fame
- Auburn High School Athletic Halls of Fame
- Ithaca College Women's Basketball gives an annual award in her honor
