= Auburndale =

Auburndale may refer to:

- Auburndale, Alberta
- Auburndale, Nova Scotia
- Auburndale, Florida
- Auburndale, Louisville, Kentucky, a neighborhood
- Auburndale, Massachusetts
  - Auburndale station (MBTA)
- Auburndale (town), Wisconsin
  - Auburndale, Wisconsin, a village within the town
- Auburndale, Queens, a New York City neighborhood
  - Auburndale station (LIRR)

== See also ==
- Auburndale, a canceled product in the list of Intel microprocessors
