= List of mayors of Auburn =

List of mayors of Auburn may refer to:

- List of mayors of Auburn, New York, United States
- List of mayors of Auburn, Alabama, United States

== See also ==
- Auburn § Places
