= Bernard G. Ehrlich =

US Army major general

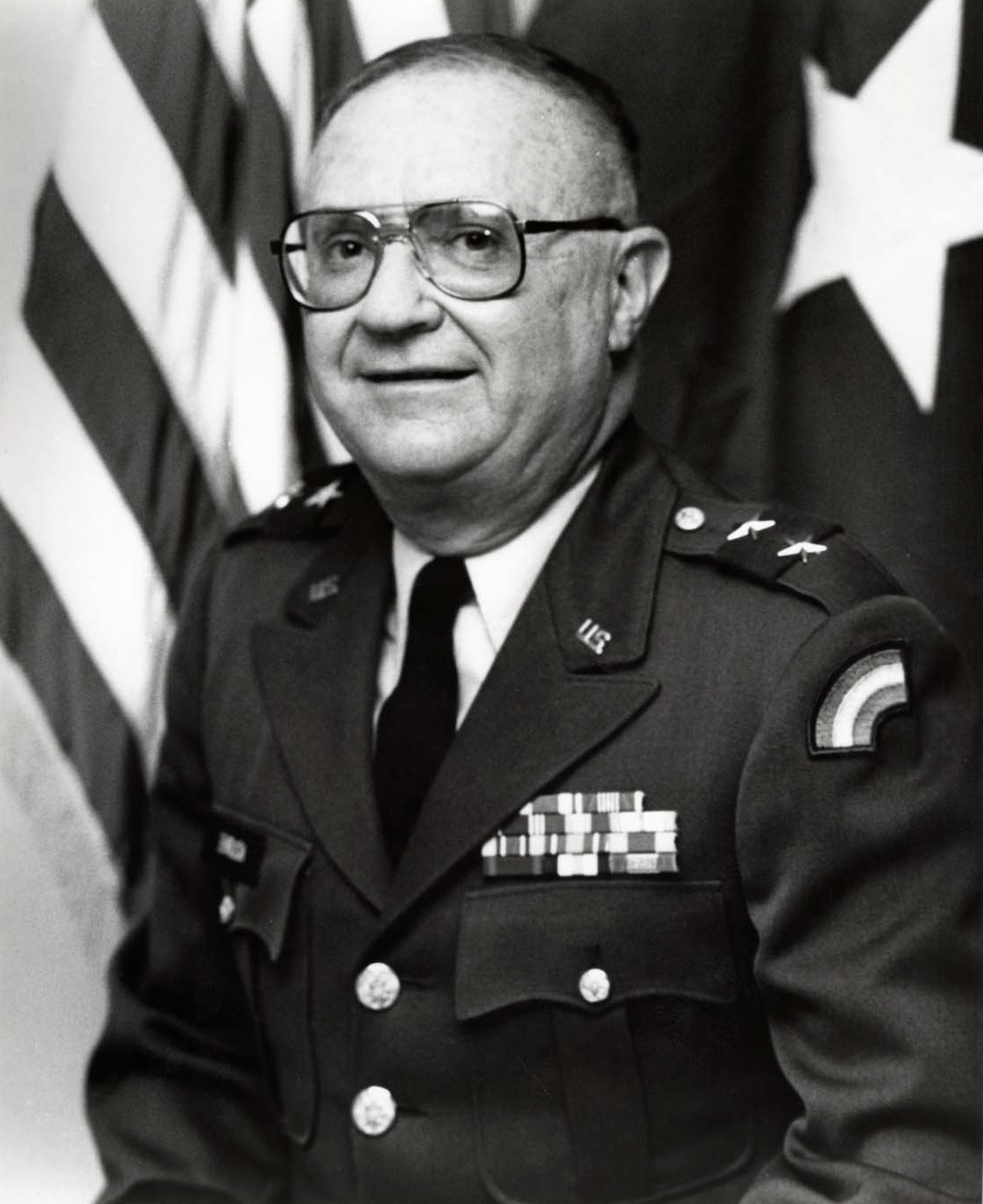
- Ehrlich as a major general in 1985
- Born: October 14, 1928; Warsaw, Poland
- Died: March 7, 2014 (aged 85); Mount Kisco, New York, US
- Burial place: Arlington National Cemetery
- Education: New York University; New York University School of Law; United States Army Command and General Staff College
- Spouse: Marjorie Bernice Ridge (m. 1955; death 2014)
- Children: 2
- Military career
- Allegiance: United States
- Service: United States Army
- Service years: 1952–1986
- Rank: Major General
- Units: New York Army National Guard; United States Army Reserve
- Commands: 1st Battalion, 71st Infantry Regiment; 2nd Brigade, 42nd Infantry Division; 42nd Infantry Division
- Conflicts: Cold War
- Awards: Meritorious Service Medal; Army Commendation Medal; Complete list
- Other work: Attorney; Businessman

Bernard G. Ehrlich (14 October 1928 – 7 March 2014) was an American attorney and military officer from New York. He served in the United States Army and New York Army National Guard from 1952 to 1986 and attained the rank of major general as commander of the 42nd Infantry Division. He was the longtime law partner of US Representative Mario Biaggi, and Ehrlich's military career ended when Biaggi and he were accused of crimes related to the Wedtech scandal.

== Biography ==
Bernard Gordon Ehrlich (Note: Ehrlich's last name appears as "Erlich" in some news stories and written records.) was born in Warsaw, Poland (Note: Some editions of the Official National Guard Register give Ehrlich's birthplace as Bermuda. Most documentary sources, including his World War II draft registration and the 1950 US Census, give his birthplace as Poland.) on 14 October 1928. He graduated from New York University with a Bachelor of Arts degree in 1949 and he received his LL.B. from New York University School of Law in 1951. After he was admitted to the bar, Ehrlich practiced law with the Bronx firm of Ehrlich and Lang, which became Biaggi, Ehrlich and Lang after Mario Biaggi became a partner in the late 1960s.

Ehrlich was drafted for military service during the Korean War and joined the United States Army in January 1952. After completing his initial training at Fort Dix, New Jersey, he was selected to attend Officer Candidate School. He received his commission as a second lieutenant of Infantry in March 1953 and remained on active duty with the 9th Infantry Division at Fort Dix until receiving his discharge in March 1954. He was assigned to the United States Army Reserve from April to September 1954, when he joined the New York Army National Guard. Ehrlich served in the Reserve again from 1958 until 1966, when he rejoined the New York National Guard.

Ehrlich advanced through the ranks in staff and command assignments during the Cold War and commanded an Infantry platoon and Cavalry troop before being assigned to command 1st Battalion, 71st Infantry Regiment in the mid-1970s as a lieutenant colonel. After graduating from the United States Army Command and General Staff College, In the early 1980s, he commanded 2nd Brigade, 42nd Infantry Division as a colonel. He served as New York's assistant adjutant general for army after receiving promotion to brigadier general in 1982. In October 1985, Ehrlich was promoted to major general and in January 1986 he was assigned as commander of the 42nd Infantry Division. He served until October 1986, when he was relieved of command, succeeded by Martin E. Lind, and retired.

At the time of his relief from command, Ehrlich, Biaggi, and several others were under investigation for crimes associated with the Wedtech scandal. Ehrlich was acquitted of charges that he bribed the Adjutant General of New York, Vito J. Castellano. He was convicted of racketeering and other crimes, and received a sentence of six years in federal prison and a fine of $220,000.

Ehrlich was disbarred as a result of his involvement with Wedtech. He subsequently operated companies that provided health care services including ambulettes to hospitals in and around New York City. Ehrlich's businesses made news in 2008 and 2009 when Anthony S. Seminerio, a member of the New York State Assembly, pleaded guilty to taking bribes disguised as consulting fees to assist medical service companies, including those owned by Ehrlich. Ehrlich died in Mount Kisco, New York on 7 March 2014. He was buried at Arlington National Cemetery.

== Awards ==
Ehrlich's federal awards included:

- Meritorious Service Medal
- Army Commendation Medal
- Army Good Conduct Medal
- National Defense Service Medal
- Armed Forces Reserve Medal
- Army Reserve Components Achievement Medal

Ehrlich's state awards included:

- New York State Conspicuous Service Medal
- New York State Military Commendation Medal
- New York Long and Faithful Service Medal
- New York Aid to Civil Authority Medal
- New York Humane Service to NYS Medal

== Dates of rank ==
- Enlisted service, 2 January 1952 to 5 March 1953.
- Second Lieutenant, 6 March 1953.
- First Lieutenant, 13 September 1954
- Captain, c. 1960
- Major, 17 December 1965
- Lieutenant Colonel, 13 April 1972.
- Colonel, 10 March 1978
- Brigadier General, 5 August 1982
- Major General, October 1985
