= Martin E. Lind =

US Army major general

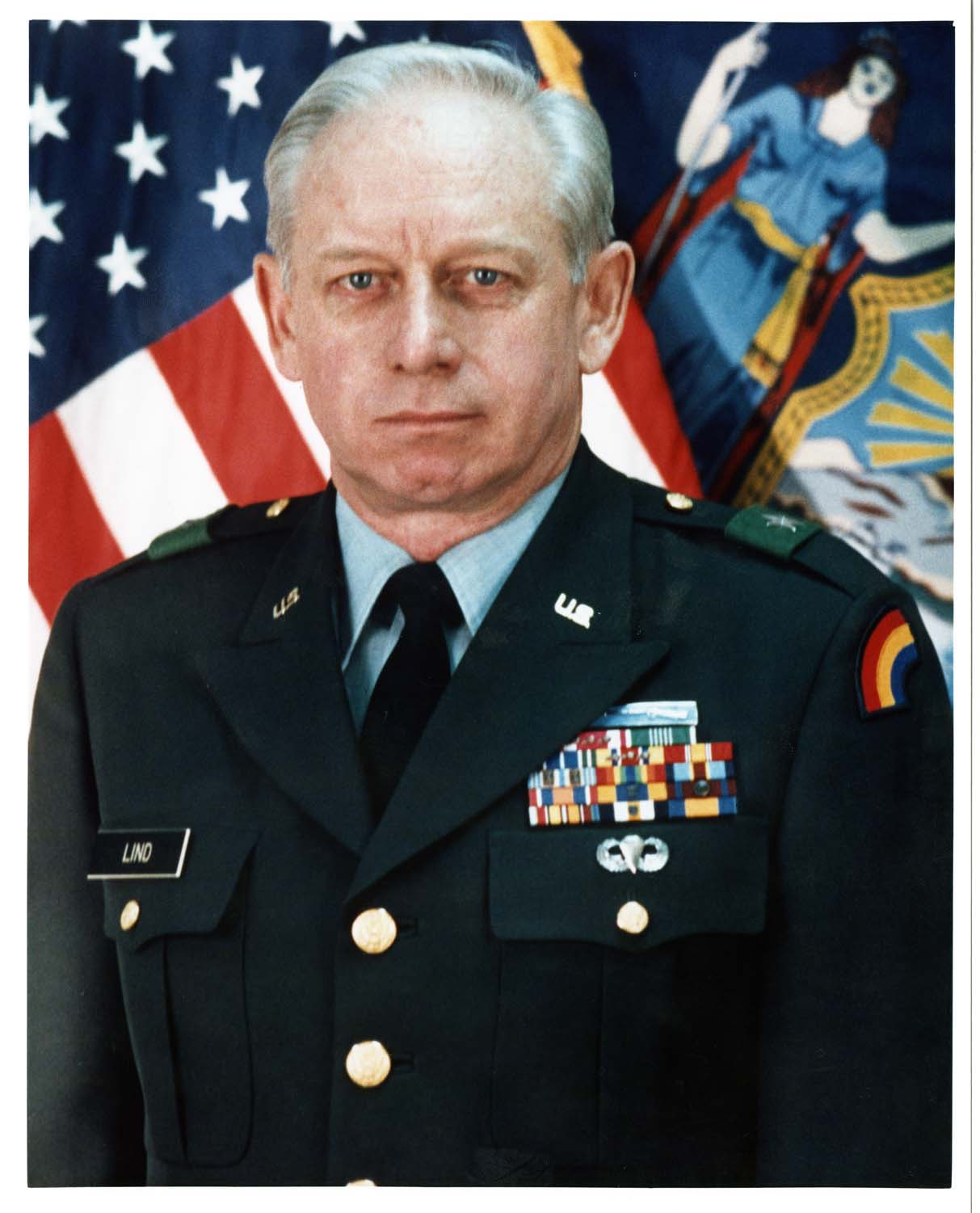
- Lind as a brigadier general in 1985
- Born: 31 July 1931; Auburn, New York, US
- Died: 22 June 2018 (aged 86); Port Orange, Florida, US
- Burial place: Arlington National Cemetery
- Alma mater: Clarkson University; United States Army Command and General Staff College; United States Army War College
- Spouse: Joyce Elaine (Tolley) Lind (m. 1958–2018)
- Children: 3
- Military career
- Service: United States Army; United States Army Reserve; New York Army National Guard
- Service years: 1953–1956 (Army); 1956–1958 (Reserve); 1958–1991 (National Guard)
- Rank: Major General
- Units: US Army Signal Corps; US Army Infantry Branch
- Commands: Empire State Military Academy; 42nd Infantry Division
- Wars: Cold War
- Awards: Army Distinguished Service Medal; Meritorious Service Medal; Army Commendation Medal; Army Achievement Medal

Martin E. Lind (31 July 1931 – 22 June 2018) was a career officer in the United States Army. A veteran of the Cold War and a longtime member of the New York Army National Guard, Lind attained the rank of major general. His career with the Army, United States Army Reserve, and National Guard spanned 38 years, and his awards and decorations included the Army Distinguished Service Medal.

Lind was a native of Auburn, New York and a 1953 graduate of Clarkson University. He participated in the Reserve Officers' Training Corps program and at graduation received his commission as a second lieutenant in the US Army Signal Corps. He completed the Signal Officer Basic Course in 1954 and served on active duty with the 82nd Airborne Signal Battalion until 1956, including exercises and mobilizations in the Far East during the Korean War.

After leaving the active army, Lind served in the United States Army Reserve for two years, then transferred his military membership to the New York Army National Guard. He served primarily in the 108th Infantry Regiment, and he became a member of the National Guard's fulltime workforce as a dual-status federal technician. His senior assignments included chief of staff for the New York Army National Guard, superintendent of the Empire State Military Academy, deputy state adjutant general and deputy commander of the New York Army National Guard. He commanded the 42nd Infantry Division from 1986 to 1987 and 1989 to 1991. Lind retired in 1991.

== Early life ==
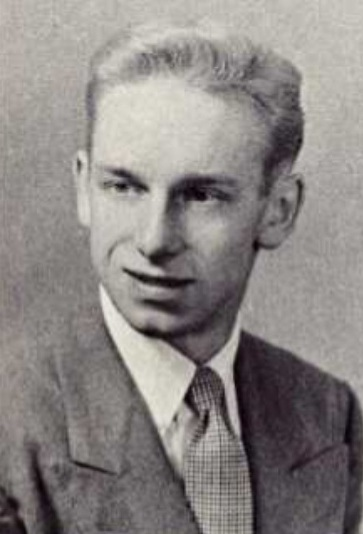
Lind as a college senior in 1953

Martin Edward Lind Jr. was born in Auburn, New York on 7 July 1931, the son of Martin E. Lind Sr. and Elsie (Evans) Lind. He was raised and educated in Auburn and Sennett and was a 1949 graduate of Auburn High School. He then attended Clarkson University, from which he graduated in 1953 with a bachelor of business administration degree. While in college, he played tennis, participated in the school's rifle club and drill team, and joined the staffs of the Clarkson Journal newspaper and WNTC radio station.

While at Clarkson, Lind participated in the Reserve Officers' Training Corps; at graduation, he received his commission as a second lieutenant in the Signal Corps. After completion of the Signal Officer Basic Course, Lind served with the 82nd Airborne Signal Battalion, including assignments as platoon leader, company executive officer, and battalion operations officer. Lind's regular army service included exercises and temporary duty in the Far East during the Korean War. He was discharged in 1956, after which he returned to New York and served for two years in the United States Army Reserve. In 1958, Lind married Joyce Elaine Tolley. They were married until his death and were the parents of three sons.

=== Military education ===
Professional development courses Lind completed during his career included:

- Signal Officer Basic Course
- Infantry Officer Advanced Course
- United States Army Command and General Staff College
- United States Army War College
- Reserve Components National Security Course, National Defense University

== Continued career ==
In 1958, Lind transferred his military membership to the New York Army National Guard (NYARNG). He served primarily with 1st Battalion, 108th Infantry Regiment in Auburn, and joined the National Guard's fulltime workforce as a dual-status federal technician. He was also active in professional organizations, to include the Reserve Officers Association.

As Lind's career progressed, his senior assignments included NYARNG deputy chief of staff and chief of staff. His command assignments included superintendent of the Empire State Military Academy. In 1986, Lind, then serving as assistant division commander of the 42nd Infantry Division, was assigned to the division command after Bernard G. Ehrlich was relieved over allegations of corruption. Lind served until 1987 and was succeeded by Richard Evans.

In 1987, Lind was assigned as deputy adjutant general and deputy commander of the New York Army National Guard. In 1989, Lind was again assigned to command of the 42nd Infantry Division; he served until 1991 and was succeeded by John W. Cudmore. In retirement, Lind resided in Spruce Creek, Florida and on Fourth Lake near Old Forge, New York. He died in Port Orange, Florida on 22 June 2018. Lind was buried at Arlington National Cemetery.

== Awards ==
Lind's federal awards and decorations included:

- Army Distinguished Service Medal
- Meritorious Service Medal
- Army Commendation Medal
- Army Achievement Medal
- Army Reserve Components Achievement Medal
- National Defense Service Medal
- Armed Forces Reserve Medal
- Overseas Service Ribbon
- Expert Infantryman Badge
- Parachutist Badge

Among Lind's state awards were:

- New York Conspicuous Service Medal
- New York Military Commendation Medal
- New York Long and Faithful Service Medal
- New York Recruiting Medal
- New York Aid to Civil Authority Medal
- New York Humane Service to NYS Medal

== Dates of rank ==
Lind's dates of rank were:

- Second Lieutenant, 8 June 1953
- First Lieutenant, 9 February 1956
- Captain, 1 August 1961
- Major, 27 December 1965
- Lieutenant Colonel, 28 March 1974
- Colonel, 8 November 1978
- Brigadier General, 22 February 1985
- Major General, 17 December 1987
