= Richard Evans (brigadier general) =

US Army brigadier general (1934–2026)

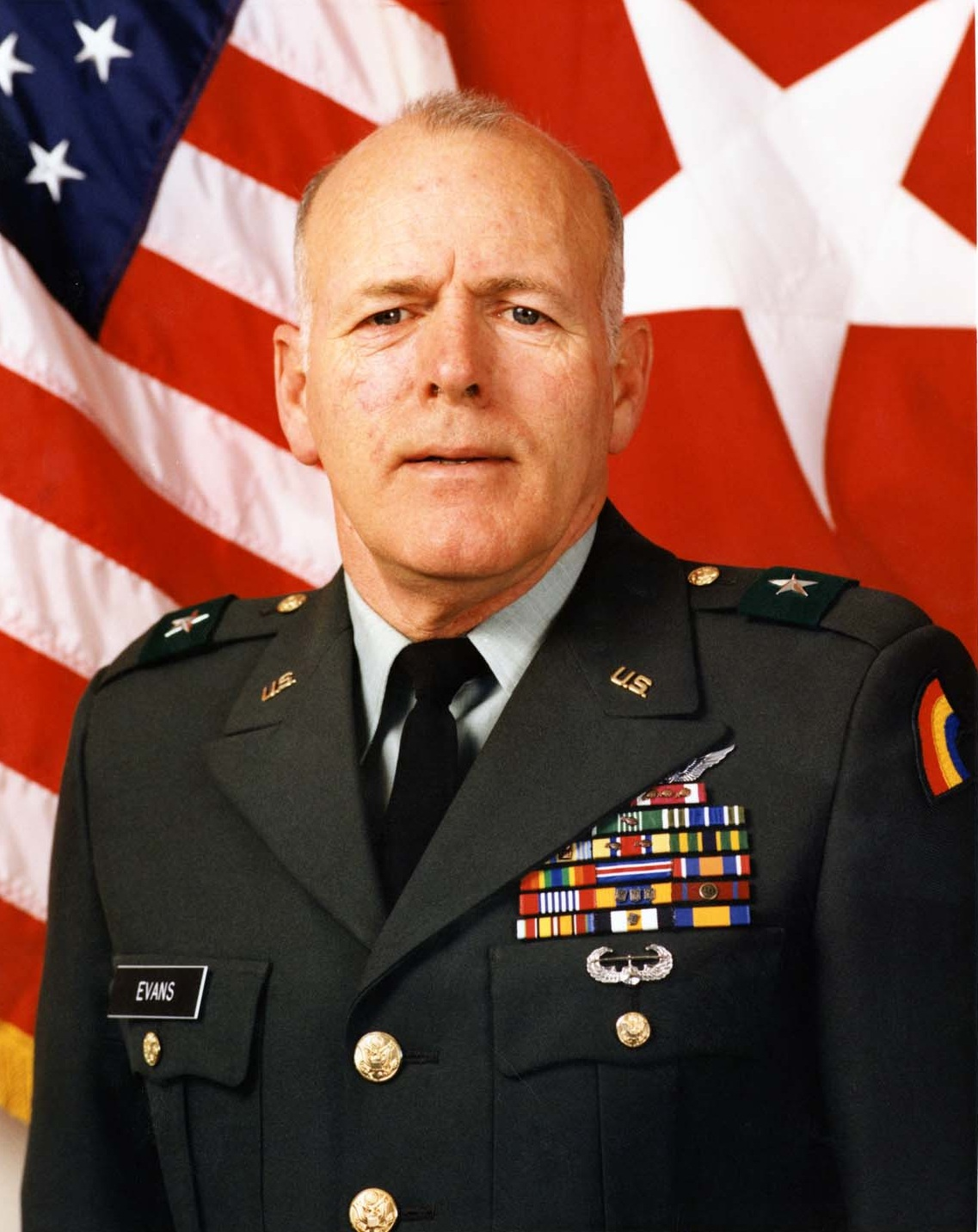
- Evans c. 1988
- Born: 25 June 1934; Utica, New York, US
- Died: 13 March 2026 (aged 91); Utica, New York, US
- Burial place: Mount Olivet Cemetery, Whitesboro, New York, US
- Education: Utica College; United States Army Command and General Staff College; United States Army War College
- Spouse: Joan Behr (m. 1952–2026)
- Children: 5
- Military career
- Service: United States Army
- Service years: 1952–1989
- Rank: Brigadier General
- Service number: 02282718
- Units: US Army Armor Branch; US Army Military Police Branch
- Commands: 107th Military Police Company; 102nd Military Police Battalion; 205th Support Group; 42nd Infantry Division
- Wars: Cold War
- Awards: Meritorious Service Medal; Army Commendation Medal; Army Achievement Medal; New York Conspicuous Service Medal; New York Meritorious Service Medal
- Other work: Business executive

Richard Evans (25 June 1934 – 13 March 2026) was a career officer in the New York Army National Guard. He served from 1952 to 1989 and was a veteran of the Cold War. Evans attained the rank of brigadier general as commander of the 42nd Infantry Division from 1987 to 1989, and his awards and decorations included four awards of the Meritorious Service Medal, two awards of the Army Commendation Medal, the Army Achievement Medal, the New York Conspicuous Service Medal, and the New York Meritorious Service Medal. In his civilian career, Evans was an executive for corporations including GE Aerospace and Lockheed Martin.

== Early life and civilian career ==
Richard Evans was born in Utica, New York on 25 June 1934, a son of Robert F. Evans and Margaret Ester (Geary) Evans. He was raised and educated in the East Utica neighborhood and left high school to begin working. Jobs at the start of his career included cooking, harvesting vegetables, setting bowling pins, assisting in a veterinary clinic, and repairing cars. He achieved success as a mechanic, which led to his purchase and operation of a filling station and garage in Utica. While running the garage, he began attending Utica College on nights and weekends, and he graduated in 1965 with a Bachelor of Science degree in accounting.

Evans later went on to a career as a corporate manager and executive for companies including GE Aerospace and Lockheed Martin, where he became a senior marketing and contracts executive. After retiring from Lockheed Martin, he worked as president of Critical Imaging, a company that produces advanced optical and thermal imaging equipment, and he remained in this position until his death. Evans was also an accountant and tax return preparer, and made his expertise available to family, friends, and Utica-area small businesses.

== Military career ==
Evans enlisted in the New York Army National Guard in December 1952. He served as an enlisted soldier and noncommissioned officer until February 1956, when he was commissioned as a second lieutenant of Armor. He was promoted to first lieutenant in February 1959 and transferred to the Military Police branch in March. He was a 1960 graduate of the Associate Military Police Officer Course and he was promoted to captain in December 1961. In the early 1960s, Evans commanded the 107th Military Police Company, which was headquartered in Utica. Evans later completed the Military Police Officer Advanced Course and he was promoted to major in 1968. In the early 1970s, Evans served as executive officer of the 102nd Military Police Battalion in Utica, including state active duty in the Southern Tier during recovery efforts following severe flooding. Evans later graduated from the United States Army Command and General Staff College and he was promoted to lieutenant colonel in October 1974.

In 1985, Evans completed the course at the United States Army War College. The senior positions in which he served included commander of the 102nd Military Police Battalion and commander of the 205th Support Group. As commander of the MP battalion, he led the unit in 1979 when National Guard units were activated to temporarily take on the duties of striking workers at the state's psychiatric hospitals and prisons. As commander of the 205th Support Group, he completed the United States Army Air Assault School. Evans was promoted to brigadier general in February 1986 and he served as assistant division commander of the 42nd Infantry Division prior to assuming command of the division. Evans succeeded Martin E. Lind as the 42nd Division's commander in 1987, and he served until retiring in 1989, when Lind was again assigned to command the division.

Evans's awards included Meritorious Service Medal with 3 oak leaf clusters, the Army Commendation Medal with oak leaf cluster, Army Achievement Medal, New York Conspicuous Service Medal, New York Meritorious Service Medal, Air Assault Badge, and Aircrew Badge.

== Personal life and death ==
On 27 September 1952, Evans married Joan Behr of Utica. They were married until his death and were the parents of five sons.

In retirement, Evans resided in Whitesboro and Old Forge, New York. He died in Utica on 13 March 2026. Evans was buried at Mount Olivet Cemetery in Whitesboro. Joan Behr Evans died in April 2026.
