= Samsula-Spruce Creek, Florida =

- CDP
- Location in Volusia County and the state of Florida
- Coordinates: 29°01′53″N 81°03′36″W
- Country: United States
- State: Florida
- County: Volusia

Area
  - Total: 16.83 sq mi (43.58 km^{2})
  - Land: 16.81 sq mi (43.53 km^{2})
  - Water: 0.019 sq mi (0.05 km^{2})
- Elevation: 26 ft (7.9 m)

Population (2020)
  - Total: 4,877
  - Density: 290.2/sq mi (112.04/km^{2})
- Time zone: UTC-5 (Eastern (EST))
  - Summer (DST): UTC-4 (EDT)
- FIPS code: 12-63362
- GNIS ID: 2402820

Samsula-Spruce Creek is a census-designated place (CDP) in Volusia County, Florida, United States. As of the 2020 census, Samsula-Spruce Creek had a population of 4,877. While many households reside here, it is principally an agricultural area west of the cities of Port Orange and New Smyrna Beach.

== Geography ==
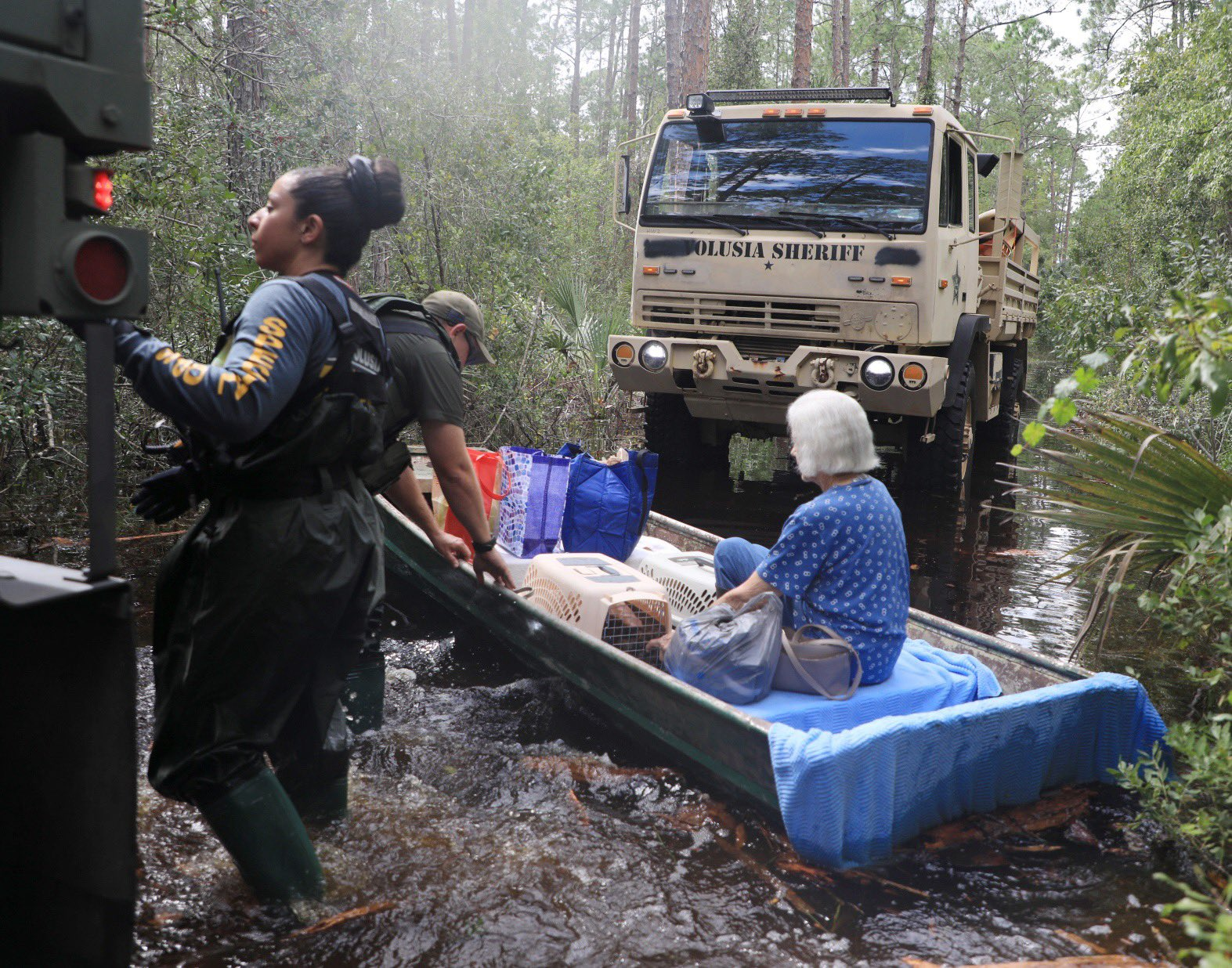
VSO deputies responding to Hurricane Milton, 2024

According to the United States Census Bureau, the CDP has a total area of 17.5 square miles (45.2 km^{2}), of which 17.4 square miles (45.1 km^{2}) is land and 0.039 square miles (0.1 km^{2}), or 0.23%, is water.

== Demographics ==
Historical population
Census	Pop.	Note	%±
2010	5,047		—
2020	4,877		−3.4%
U.S. Decennial Census

=== 2020 census ===
As of the 2020 census, Samsula-Spruce Creek had a population of 4,877. The median age was 58.4 years. 12.2% of residents were under the age of 18 and 36.7% of residents were 65 years of age or older. For every 100 females there were 105.1 males, and for every 100 females age 18 and over there were 104.7 males age 18 and over.

59.3% of residents lived in urban areas, while 40.7% lived in rural areas.

There were 2,175 households in Samsula-Spruce Creek, of which 15.9% had children under the age of 18 living in them. Of all households, 58.3% were married-couple households, 17.1% were households with a male householder and no spouse or partner present, and 19.4% were households with a female householder and no spouse or partner present. About 25.9% of all households were made up of individuals and 17.2% had someone living alone who was 65 years of age or older.

There were 2,512 housing units, of which 13.4% were vacant. The homeowner vacancy rate was 2.0% and the rental vacancy rate was 12.3%.

Racial composition as of the 2020 census
Race	Number	Percent
White	4,420	90.6%
Black or African American	45	0.9%
American Indian and Alaska Native	15	0.3%
Asian	78	1.6%
Native Hawaiian and Other Pacific Islander	1	0.0%
Some other race	36	0.7%
Two or more races	282	5.8%
Hispanic or Latino (of any race)	178	3.6%

=== 2000 census ===
At the 2000 census, there were 4,877 people, 1,953 households and 1,511 families residing in the CDP. The population density was 94.5/km^{2} (244.9/mi^{2}). There were 2,203 housing units at an average density of 42.7/km^{2} (110.6/mi^{2}). The racial makeup of the CDP was 97.13% White, 0.33% African American, 0.33% Native American, 0.82% Asian, 0.08% Pacific Islander, 0.14% from other races, and 1.17% from two or more races. Hispanic or Latino of any race were 1.76% of the population. 21.1% were of German, 17.1% English, 9.1% Irish, 7.8% American and 6.1% Italian ancestry according to Census 2000.

There were 1,953 households, of which 25.6% had children under the age of 18 living with them, 68.7% were married couples living together, 5.5% had a female householder with no husband present, and 22.6% were non-families. 16.7% of all households were made up of individuals, and 6.5% had someone living alone who was 65 years of age or older. The average household size was 2.50 and the average family size was 2.79.

19.7% of the population were under the age of 18, 5.5% from 18 to 24, 21.9% from 25 to 44, 33.9% from 45 to 64, and 19.1% who were 65 years of age or older. The median age was 46 years. For every 100 females, there were 98.1 males. For every 100 females age 18 and over, there were 97.8 males.

The median household income was $59,427 and the median family income was $68,101. Males had a median income of $40,608 versus $24,390 for females. The per capita income was $33,084. About 4.5% of families and 5.4% of the population were below the poverty line, including 6.2% of those under age 18 and 6.7% of those age 65 or over.

== Notable residents ==
- Martin E. Lind, US Army major general, retired in Spruce Creek
