= Mount Auburn =

Mount Auburn may refer to:

In the United States:

- Mount Auburn, Illinois
- Mount Auburn, Indiana
- Mount Auburn, Franklin County, Indiana
- Mount Auburn, Iowa
- Mount Auburn Cemetery, Cambridge and Watertown, Massachusetts
- Mount Auburn Historic District, Cincinnati, Ohio
- Mount Auburn Hospital, Cambridge, Massachusetts

== See also ==
- Mount Auburn Cemetery (disambiguation)
