= Emma Paddock Telford =

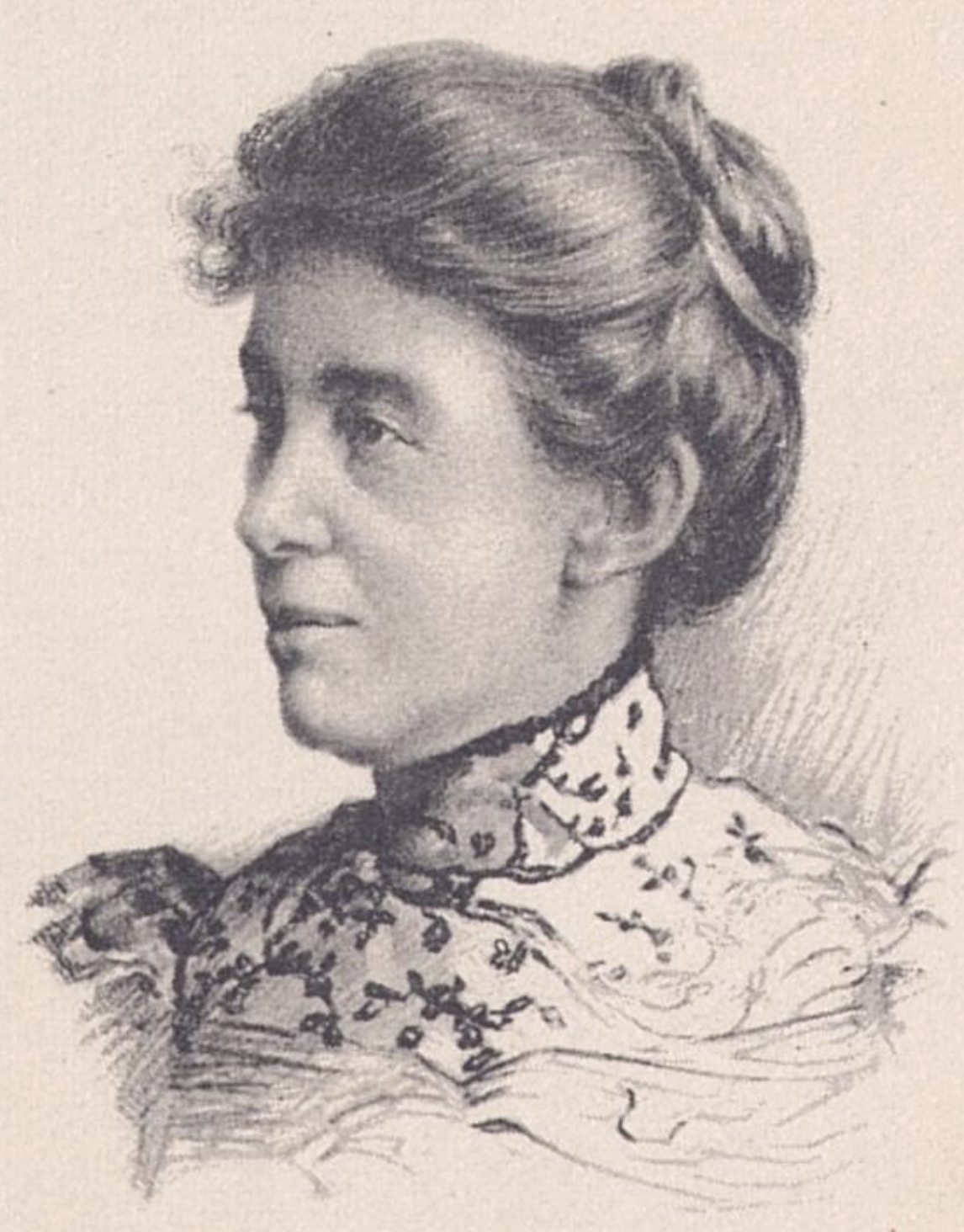
- Telford in 1912
- Born: Emma Paddock; November 9, 1851; Auburn, New York, U.S.
- Died: January 26, 1920 (aged 68); Venice, California, U.S.
- Education: Elmira College; Pratt Institute
- Occupations: writer; war correspondent; magazine editor; traveler
- Spouse: William Halsey Telford (m. 1874; died 1907)
- Children: 1
- Writing career
- Genres: culinary; home economics; travel
- Literary movement: Sunshine Society

Signature
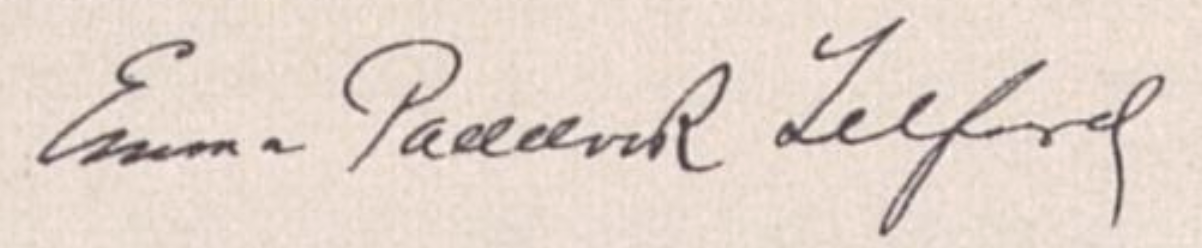

Emma Paddock Telford (November 9, 1851 – January 26, 1920) was an American writer, war correspondent, editor, and traveler. She was the author of several books on culinary and household topics, and also wrote for various publication including New-York Tribune (1898–1901), The New York Herald (1903–04), and New York Evening Telegram staff (1904–11). She served as the household editor of The Delineator, The Designer, The Woman's Magazine, and did other editorial work for World Journal, New-York Tribune, and The New York Times. Telford owned her own syndicate. Between 1900 and 1912, she was a lecturer for the New York Board of Education. Telford was the first American woman to cross the Balkans during her 1897 trip covering the Greco-Turkish war of 1897. She hailed from Auburn, New York where she was a neighbor of Harriet Tubman.

== Early life and education ==
Emma Paddock was born in Auburn, New York, November 9, 1851, daughter of Lewis (d. 1909) and Florina (White) Paddock. Her New England ancestors were from Massachusetts.

After graduating from Auburn High School (1869), she attended Elmira College, at which time she was a classmate of Mary Hinman Abel, a food authority of that era. Telford also took a course in food economics at the Pratt Institute, with special work under Miss Maria Daniels, Sarah Tyson Rorer, and Maria Parloa.

== Career ==
In Auburn, New York, on May 13, 1874, she married William Halsey Telford (d. 1907). They had one child, a daughter, Mabel Florina Telford. When the family developed financial hardships, Telford began taking paying guests in her home.

Removing to Brooklyn with her daughter in 1894, Telford began her newspaper work that year. She received practical encouragement for her writing by Margaret Sangster, then editor of Harper's Bazaar, Cynthia May Alden, then on New York Recorder, Margaret Welch, of The New York Times, and Miss Gould, of New York World.

Beginning in December 1895 and through July 1905, she edited the Domestic Science in the Household column for the Brooklyn Times-Union.

On April 7, 1897, she left on the City of Paris, for Europe and the East to make a special study of women's work and women's clubs, along altruistic, literary, social and industrial lines for the Brooklyn Standard-Union. While traveling, she also contributed to Harper's Bazaar and other New York papers. Particularly, she covered the Greco-Turkish war of 1897, traveling extensively in Asia Minor and the Balkans, as correspondent for The New York Sun, The New York Times, New York Press, and Brooklyn Standard-Union. She personally visited the scenes of the Armenian massacres and made investigation of the relief work being instituted for the widows and orphans. During this trip, she paid especial attention to Oriental and European housekeeping methods, arguing that as U.S. might have much to learn from the wider experiences of old societies. She became a student of Serbian history, her knowledge of the country being intimate and comprehensive.

Upon her return in June 1897 on the steamer Majestic Thursday, she became one of the regular staff of the New-York Tribune, at the same time appearing in the New York Free Lecture Course. The New-York Tribune announced that Telford's study of Constantinople, Asia Minor, and the Balkan States, as well as her experiences of travel, including the crossing of the Balkan Mountains by ox team, would be published as "Sketches of Travel". After leaving the New-York Tribune, Telford established and conducted a syndicate for The Kansas City Star, The Washington Star, The Philadelphia Inquirer, and the Boston Courier.

"The women of my family on both sides were all noted for their housewifely attainments as well as culture, and whatever success I have achieved along such lines is just an outcrop of my grandmothers old-time faculty." (Emma Paddock Telford, 1901)

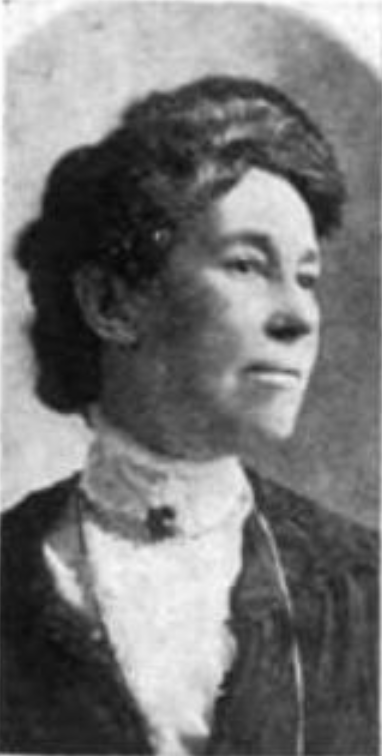
Telford in 1906

For ten years she was on the Public Lecture Course of New York City, one of her special subjects being the "Among the Indians of the Southwest", "Among the People of the Balkans", "Arizona", "Camp Life on the American Desert", "Constantinople, Its People and Problems", and the "Cradle and the Wonderland of the New World".

Following years of special work on many New York papers, Telford became associated with The Delineator, New Ideas and The Designer, as household editor. Some of her recipes were included in newspapers, including the Syracuse Herald-Journal, Honolulu Star-Advertiser and Brooklyn Times-Union.

Telford was called in 1897 to take charge of the dining hall in one of the two largest universities in California. Leaving Brooklyn in October 1899, Telford wintered in California, spending the first month among the foothills of the Sierras, at a ranch in Colfax situated over the Rising Sun Mine.

For two years, beginning in 1900, Telford sojourned in Arizona, caring for her ailing sister, Mrs. Charles Benjamin Wing; both of them were members of the Tribune Sunshine Society at the time. Staying in Mesa, Arizona, Telford was interested in forming a chapter of the Colonial Dames in that state, having been a resident of Mesa, Arizona and the valley for some years. In the same year, she accepted the charge of the Domestic Science department at Lake Erie College. After returning to Arizona, she was instrumental in forming several Sunshine branches among the Native Americans. Her Sunshine work included sending pottery made by the Pima back East, suggesting a cultural exchange be developed between the Buffalo, New York Sunshine members and the Pima women. She left Mesa, Arizona in July 1902, for Palo Alto, California, to visit with her sister again, she being the wife of Prof. Wing, of Stanford University.

Telford published The State Journal Cook Book in 1908, and Standard Paper Bag Cookery was published in 1921. She was co-author with Mary Dawson of The Book of Parties and Pastimes (1912) and other works on similar topics. Good housekeeper's cook book (1914) contained special chapters not found in most cook books of the era: candies, cookies, dishes for invalids, ices, jellies, menus, preserves, salads, and summer drinks.

She was a member of the East Hill Reading Club of Auburn, New York, the Arizona Antiquarian Society, American Home Economics Association, New York City League for Home Economics, Elmira College Club of New York City, Writers' Club of Brooklyn, Arizona Antiquarian Society, and the Maricopa, Arizona, chapter of the Daughters of the American Revolution.

== Personal life ==
She favored woman suffrage. In religion, Telford was Presbyterian.

Telford spent the last few years her life in Venice, California, where she died January 26, 1920.

== Selected works ==
=== Books ===
- The book of frolics for all occasions, with Mary Dawson, 1911 (text, via Hathitrust)
- The book of parties and pastimes, with Mary Dawson, 1912 (text, via Hathitrust)
- The Evening telegram cook book, with M. A. Armington (ed.), 1908 (text, via Hathitrust)
- Good housekeeper's cook book, with M. A. Armington (ed.), 1914 (text, via Hathitrust)
- Standard paper-bag cookery, 1912 (text, via Hathitrust)
- The State Journal cook book, 1908

=== Articles ===
- "Baba Hadji, Old Ismid's Mascot", New-York Tribune, 1906 (text)
- "First Cooking School in Bulgaria", Good Housekeeping, 1899
- "How to Build and Keep a Fire in the Kitchen Range or Furnace", Times Union, 1901 (text)
- "Old Morocco", The Pilgrim, 1904
- "The Perpetuation of the Turks in Europe", Gunton's Magazine, 1907
- "Uncle Sam's School for Indians at Phoenix, Arizona", Ledger Monthly, November 1901
- "Why Wear Such a February Face?", Times Union, 1901 (text)
- "Why Brigands Thrive in Turkey", The Chautauquan, 1906

=== Culinary ===
- "A Co-operative Thanksgiving Dinner", Syracuse Herald-Journal, 1906 (text)
- "Dainty After Theater Suppers in Chaffing Dish", Syracuse Herald-Journal, 1907 (text)
- "Dishes Home Cooks Will Like to Make", Syracuse Herald-Journal, 1907 (text)
- "Expert's Recipes For New Year's Day", Syracuse Herald-Journal, 1906 (text)
- "Flowers and Nuts Candied at Home for Xmas Holidays", Syracuse Herald-Journal, 1906 (text)
- "Hot Weather Recipes", Daily Sentinel, 1907 (text)
- "How the Maid Should Serve a Meal", Buffalo Courier, 1906 (text)
- "Maple Sugar Dainties", Times Union, 1901 (text)
- "Old-Fashioned Dishes for New England Supper", Syracuse Herald-Journal, 1906 (text)
- "Palatable Recipes of Dishes For Home Cooks", Syracuse Herald-Journal, 1907 (text)
- "Pineapple Pie (with and without Meringue)", Honolulu Star-Advertiser, 1921 (text)
- "Popcorn Made at Home For Christmas Trees and Dinners", Syracuse Herald-Journal, 1906 (text)
- "Putting Up the Vegetables for Winter", Buffalo Courier (text)
- "Recipes of Tasty Dishes Housewives Want", Syracuse Herald-Journal, 1907 (text)
- "Savory Mince Meat For Pies", Syracuse Herald-Journal, 1906 (text)
- "Savory Substitutes for the Thanksgiving Dinner", Syracuse Herald-Journal, 1906 (text)
- "Suncooked Prunes are the most delicious of Fruits.", Buffalo Courier Express, 1907 (text)
- "Sweetbreads are now at their best", Times Union, 1901 (text)
