= Bowling Green, Virginia =

- Town
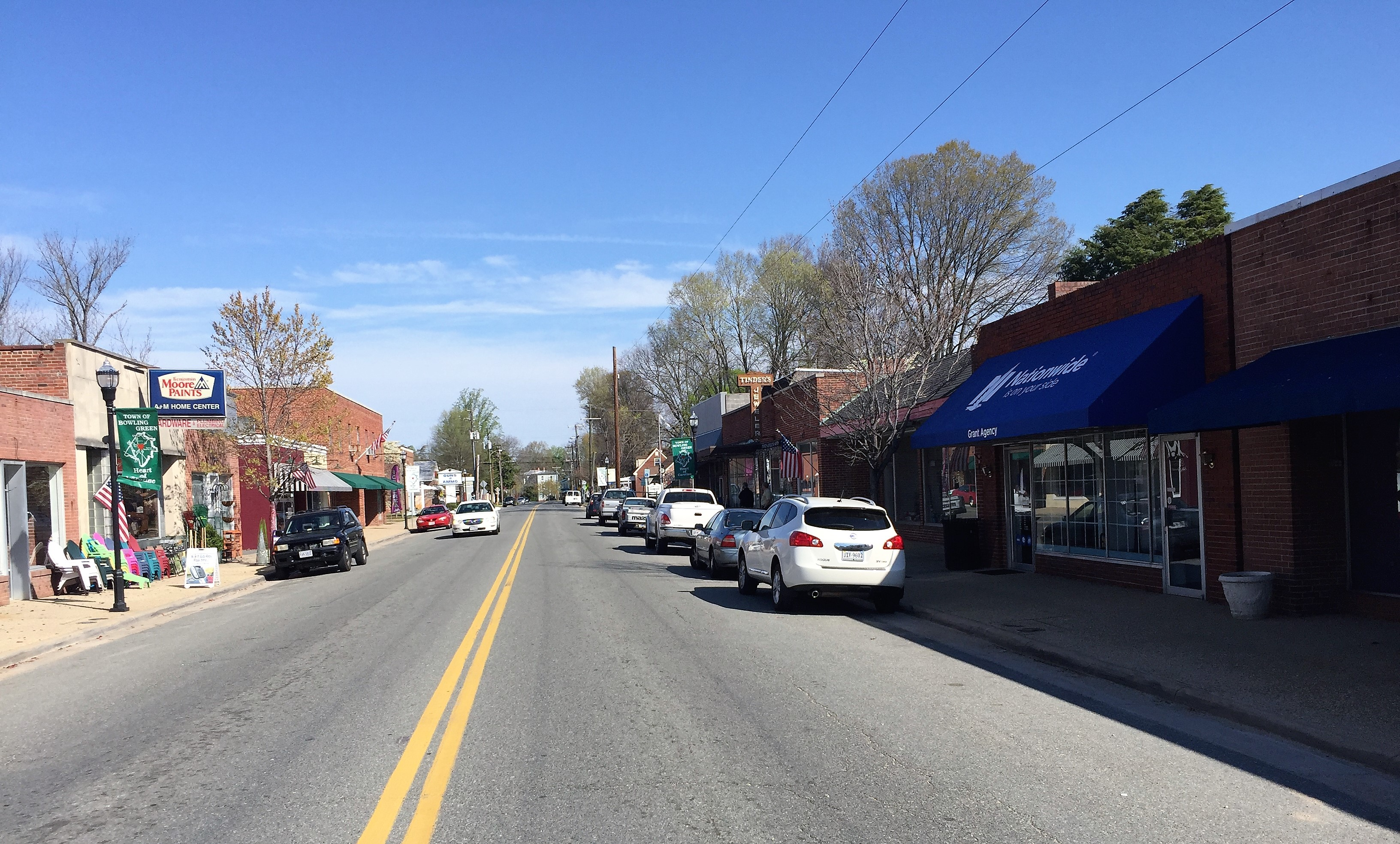
- Main Street, Bowling Green

- Flag Seal

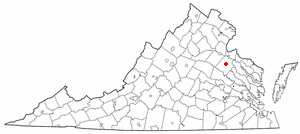
- Location in Virginia

- Location in Virginia Location in the contiguous United States
- Coordinates: 38°3′12″N 77°20′51″W
- Country: United States
- State: Virginia
- County: Caroline
- Founded: 1837

Government
  - Mayor: Tina Gambill

Area
  - Total: 1.63 sq mi (4.22 km^{2})
  - Land: 1.60 sq mi (4.15 km^{2})
  - Water: 0.023 sq mi (0.06 km^{2})
- Elevation: 226 ft (69 m)

Population (2020)
  - Total: 1,168
  - Estimate (2019): 1,175
  - Density: 732.5/sq mi (282.81/km^{2})
- Time zone: UTC−5 (Eastern (EST))
  - Summer (DST): UTC−4 (EDT)
- ZIP codes: 22427-22428
- Area code: 804
- FIPS code: 51-08888
- GNIS feature ID: 1498454
- Website: Official website

Bowling Green is an incorporated town in Caroline County, Virginia, United States. As of the 2020 census, Bowling Green had a population of 1,168.

The county seat of Caroline County since 1803, Bowling Green is best known as the "cradle of American horse racing", the home of the second-oldest Virginia Masonic Lodge, and the current location of the oldest continuously inhabited residence in Virginia.

== History ==
The town of Bowling Green was earlier known as New Hope. One of the earliest stage roads in the colony ran through the area from Richmond to the Potomac River, where a ferry crossing was operated to Charles County, Maryland. New Hope Tavern was built along the road in the 18th century and the area around it became known as New Hope.

The town was renamed for "The Bowling Green" which was the plantation of town founder, Dache Carmine, who donated the land and funds for a new courthouse when the community became the county seat in 1803. The origin of the plantation's name is not definitive but may be based on the 2-acre (8,100 m^{2}) greensward in front of the plantation house itself. The Bowling Green Estate was the site of one of the first tracks built to race horses in America. The plantation house, pre-Georgian tidewater colonial in style, was built circa 1741. A prominent colonial landmark, it is one of the oldest houses in original condition in Virginia and is listed on both the Virginia Landmarks Register and the National Register of Historic Places.

The present Caroline County Court House was built in 1835 and Bowling Green was incorporated as a town approximately two years later, in 1837. The town is home to a Masonic Lodge, Kilwinning Crosse, No. 2-237.

The Richmond, Fredericksburg and Potomac Railroad (chartered in 1834) was built through nearby Milford (just west of town) and reached Fredericksburg by 1837. This important rail link between several major northern railroads at Washington, DC and other major southern railroads at Richmond was long partially owned by the Commonwealth of Virginia, and became part of CSX Transportation in the 1990s. It is a major freight railroad line for north–south traffic and the corridor also hosts many Amtrak trains. The closest Virginia Railway Express (VRE) commuter passenger rail service to Northern Virginia is currently accessed at Fredericksburg.

In 1855, a gazetteer described the town as having "2 churches, 3 stores, 2 mills, and about 300 inhabitants".

Today, Bowling Green is located along Virginia State Route 2, one of the two earlier highways between Richmond and Fredericksburg. In later years, U.S. Route 301 was built through the area, connecting Richmond with Baltimore, Maryland with what was effectively an eastern bypass of the Washington, DC area for north–south traffic along the U.S. east coast. A new road, Virginia State Route 207 was established from Bowling Green west to Carmel Church, where it intersects Interstate 95 and U.S. Route 1, major north–south highways.

In 1941, the United States government acquired 77,000 acres (310 km^{2}) of Caroline County to the north and east of Bowling Green and established the A.P. Hill Military Reservation. Now known as Fort Walker, it was originally named for a Virginia military hero, U.S. Army and later Confederate General Ambrose Powell Hill, who was killed just prior to the end of the War in 1865. The installation's name was changed in 2023 to honor Mary Edwards Walker, an American abolitionist, prohibitionist, prisoner of war, and surgeon. She is the only woman to receive the Medal of Honor. Thousands of regular military and reserve troops undergo training each year at the installation. It has also been the site of National Jamboree gatherings of the Boy Scouts of America.

In addition to "The Bowling Green," Auburn, the Bowling Green Historic District, Caroline County Courthouse, and Green Falls are listed on the National Register of Historic Places.

== Geography ==
Bowling Green is located at 38°3′12″N 77°20′51″W (38.053428, −77.347404).

According to the United States Census Bureau, the town has a total area of 1.6 square miles (4.2 km^{2}), of which 1.6 square miles (4.1 km^{2}) is land and 0.04 square mile (0.1 km^{2}) (1.24%) is water.

== Demographics ==
Historical population
Census	Pop.	Note	%±
1850	377		—
1860	237		−37.1%
1870	395		66.7%
1880	426		7.8%
1890	511		20.0%
1900	458		−10.4%
1910	433		−5.5%
1920	463		6.9%
1930	422		−8.9%
1940	541		28.2%
1950	616		13.9%
1960	528		−14.3%
1970	528		0.0%
1980	665		25.9%
1990	727		9.3%
2000	936		28.7%
2010	1,111		18.7%
2020	1,168		5.1%
U.S. Decennial Census

As of the census of 2000, there were 936 people, 387 households, and 212 families residing in the town. The population density was 587.1 people per square mile (227.3/km^{2}). There were 425 housing units at an average density of 266.6 per square mile (103.2/km^{2}). The racial makeup of the town was 80.13% White, 18.38% African American, 0.53% Native American, 0.32% from other races, and 0.64% from two or more races. Hispanic or Latino of any race were 1.92% of the population.

There were 387 households, out of which 22.5% had children under the age of 18 living with them, 40.6% were married couples living together, 11.4% had a female householder with no husband present, and 45.0% were non-families. 39.8% of all households were made up of individuals, and 20.9% had someone living alone who was 65 years of age or older. The average household size was 2.10 and the average family size was 2.81.

In the town, the population was spread out, with 17.1% under the age of 18, 5.7% from 18 to 24, 22.9% from 25 to 44, 21.7% from 45 to 64, and 32.7% who were 65 years of age or older. The median age was 48 years. For every 100 females, there were 69.6 males. For every 100 females age 18 and over, there were 66.9 males.

The median income for a household in the town was $32,250, and the median income for a family was $49,792. Males had a median income of $30,750 versus $25,341 for females. The per capita income for the town was $20,223. About 8.5% of families and 14.2% of the population were below the poverty line, including 13.7% of those under age 18 and 22.6% of those age 65 or over.
