= Old Mansion =

Historic house in Virginia, United States

- U.S. National Register of Historic Places
- U.S. Historic district – Contributing property
- Virginia Landmarks Register
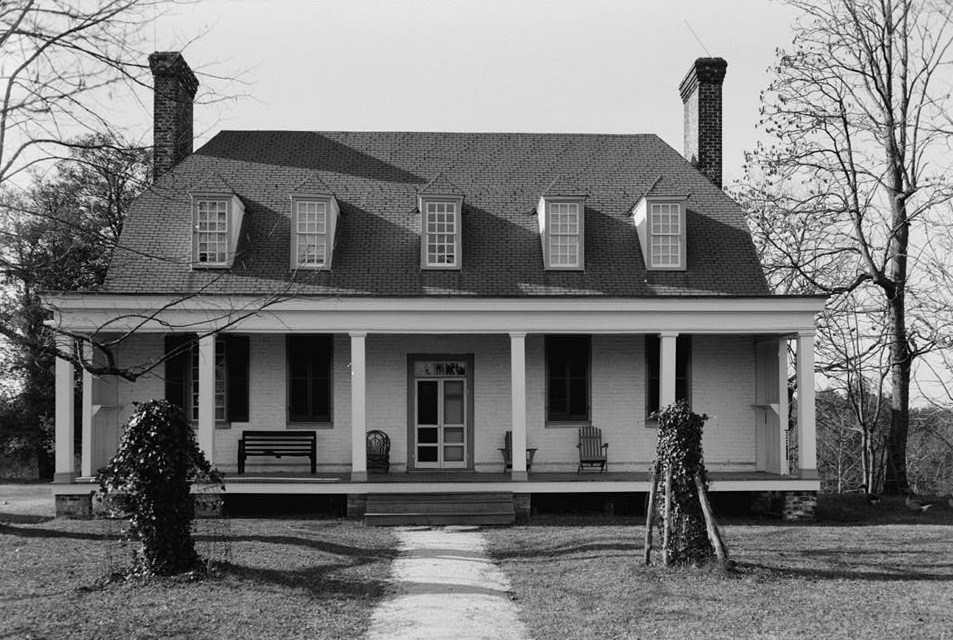

- Location within Virginia Location within the United States
- Location: S of jct. of U.S. 301 and VA 207, Bowling Green, Virginia
- Coordinates: 38°02′38.5476″N 77°20′50.0748″W
- Area: 126.86 acres (51.34 ha)
- Built: 1741, Land Grant 1665
- NRHP reference No.: 69000227
- VLR No.: 016-5010

Significant dates
- Added to NRHP: November 12, 1969
- Designated VLR: November 5, 1968

Old Mansion, originally named "The Bowling Green" by the original landowners, the Hoomes family, is a historic home located in Bowling Green, Caroline County, Virginia. The house was built around 1741. The original front section is a 1 1/2-story, brick structure with a jerkin-head roof and dormers. A rear frame addition with a gambrel roof was added in the late 18th century. The building is a private residence.

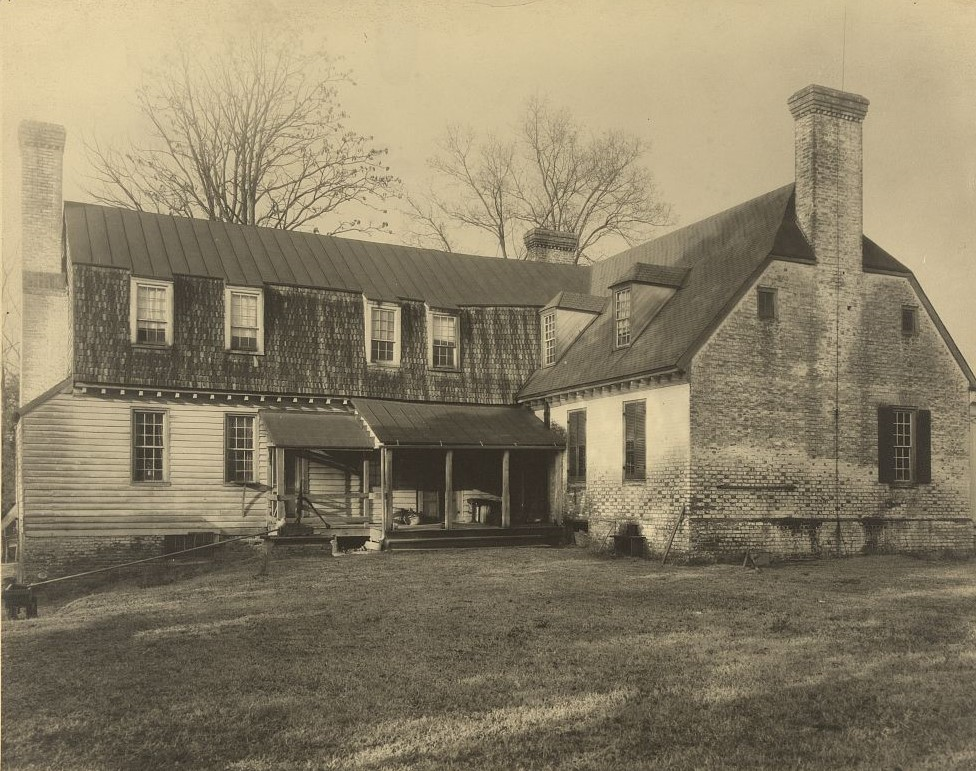
The Mansion, rear, by Frances Benjamin Johnston, 1935

It was listed on the National Register of Historic Places in 1969. Bowling Green lent its name to the town of Bowling Green, Virginia. It is included in the Bowling Green Historic District.

== See also ==
- List of the oldest buildings in Virginia
