= Bowling Green Historic District =

Historic district in Virginia, United States

- U.S. National Register of Historic Places
- U.S. Historic district
- Virginia Landmarks Register
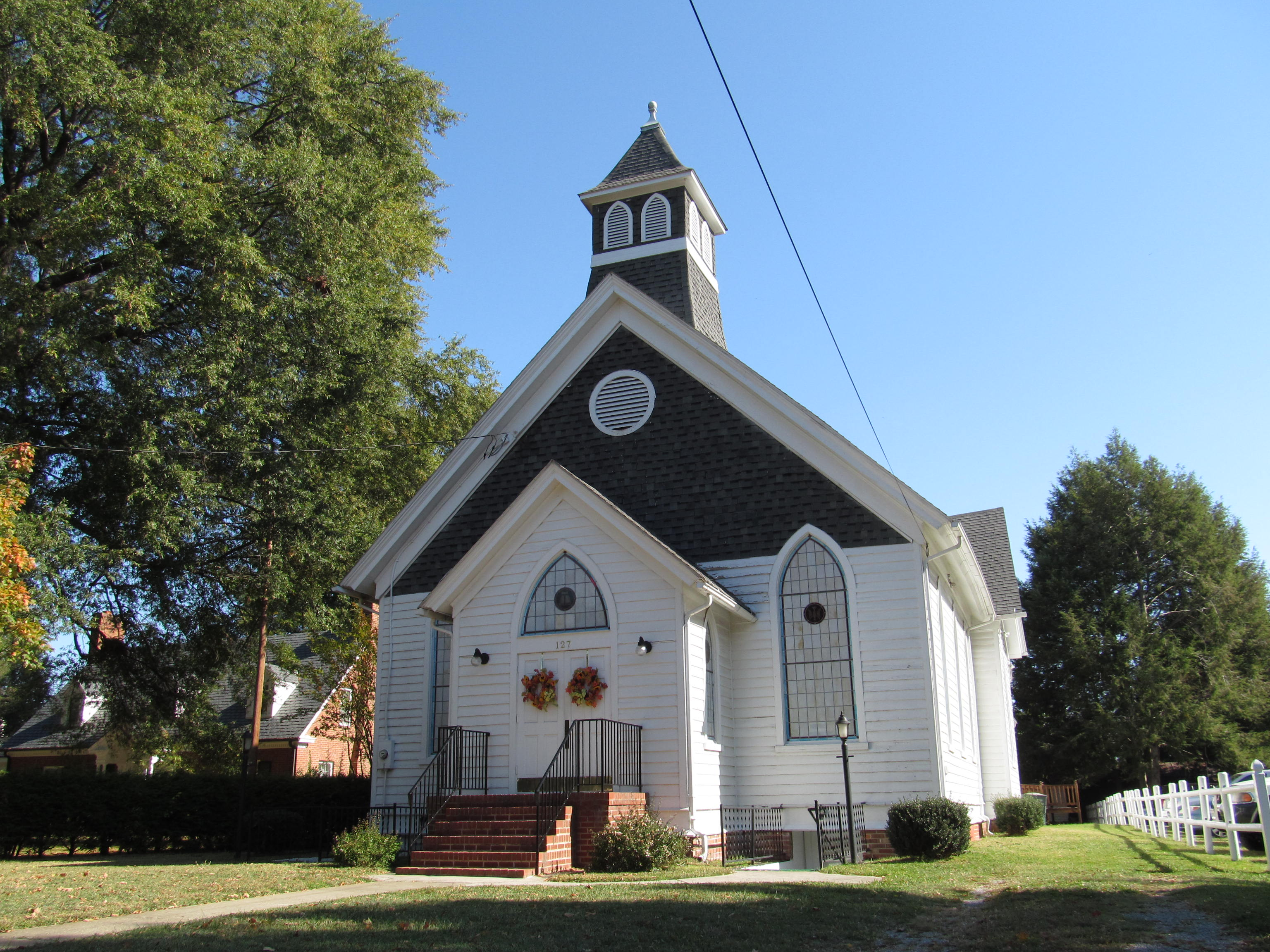
- Shiloh Baptist Church

- Location within Virginia Location within the United States
- Location: Roughly along and bounded by Bowling Green Bypass, Broadus Ave., Lakewood Rd., N. Main St., and Paige Rd., Bowling Green, Virginia
- Coordinates: 38°03′03″N 77°21′00″W
- Area: 297 acres (120 ha)
- Built: 1794
- Architect: Rose, David Jeptha; et al.
- Architectural style: Colonial, Greek Revival, et al.
- NRHP reference No.: 03000439
- VLR No.: 171-5001

Significant dates
- Added to NRHP: May 22, 2003
- Designated VLR: March 19, 2003, November 30, 2005

Bowling Green Historic District is a national historic district located at Bowling Green, Caroline County, Virginia. The district encompasses 169 contributing buildings, 1 contributing site, and 1 contributing structure in the historic core of Bowling Green. Notable properties include the Rains House (1737), A. B. Chandler, Sr. House (late 1800s), Bowling Green United Methodist Church, Shiloh Baptist Church (1895), Antioch Christian Church (c. 1920), Union Bank and Trust Company (1912), Bowling Green Baptist Church (1898), Caroline County Clerk's Office (1907), Bowling Green Town Hall (early 1940s), “Glasselton” (1846), and the site of the New Hope Tavern and Lawn Hotel. The Caroline County Courthouse and the “Old Mansion” are separately listed.

It was listed on the National Register of Historic Places in 2003.
