= Caroline County Courthouse (Virginia) =

Historic courthouse in Virginia, US

- U.S. National Register of Historic Places
- U.S. Historic district – Contributing property
- Virginia Landmarks Register
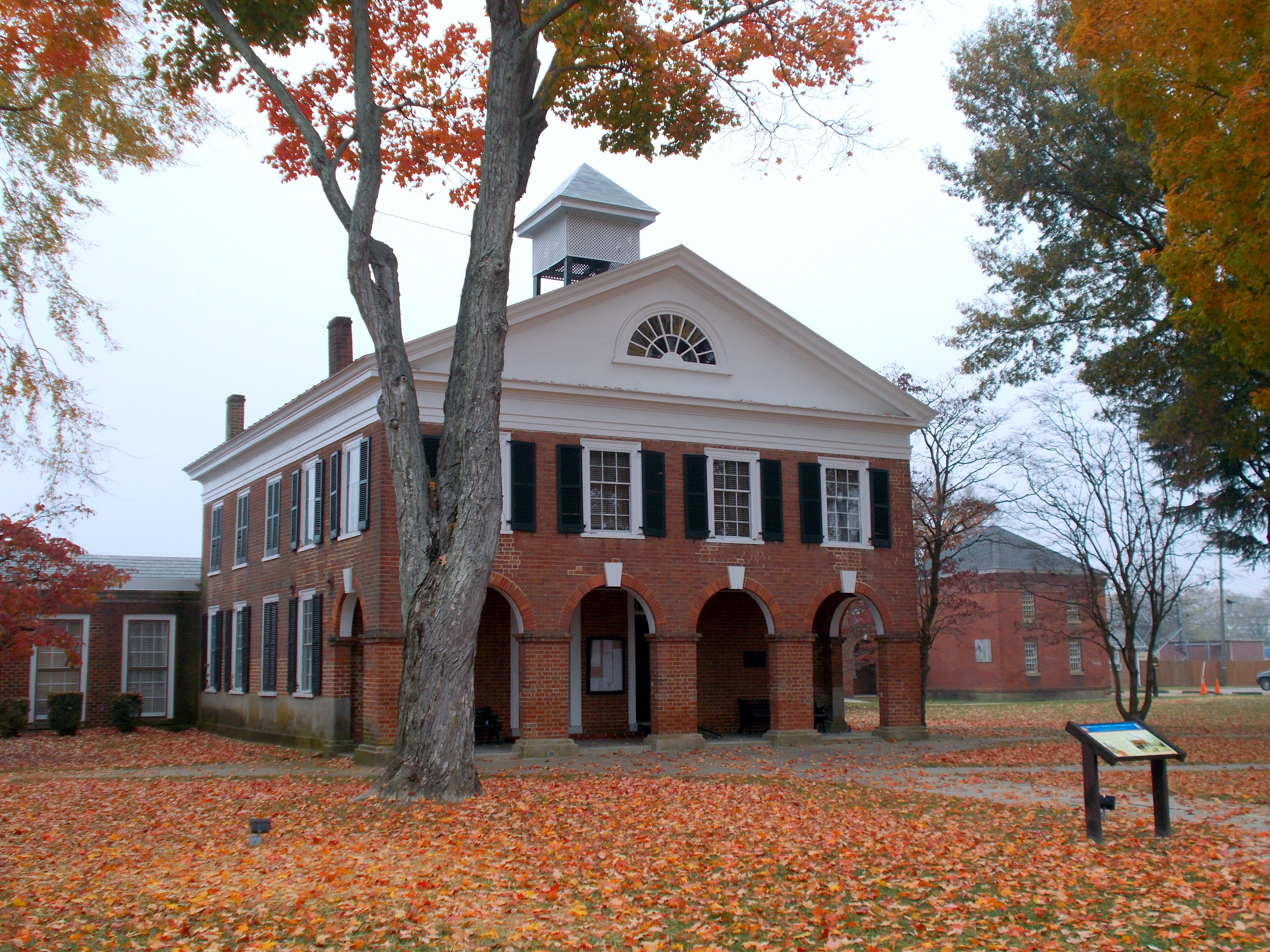
- Caroline County Courthouse, October 2012

- Location within Virginia Location within the United States
- Interactive map showing the location of Caroline County Courthouse
- Location: Main St. and Court House Lane, Bowling Green, Virginia
- Coordinates: 38°3′3″N 77°20′50″W
- Area: 9 acres (3.6 ha)
- Built: c. 1830
- Architectural style: Early Republic, Jeffersonian Roman Revival
- NRHP reference No.: 73001999
- VLR No.: 171-0003

Significant dates
- Added to NRHP: May 25, 1973
- Designated VLR: April 17, 1973

Caroline County Courthouse is a historic county courthouse located at Bowling Green, Caroline County, Virginia. It was built about 1830, and is a two-story, four bay wide, brick temple form building in the Jeffersonian Roman Revival style. The building is surrounded by a Tuscan entablature with a Tuscan pediment at either end. The front facade features an open arcade one-bay deep on the ground floor with six rounded arches.

It was listed on the National Register of Historic Places in 1973. It is included in the Bowling Green Historic District.

In front of the courthouse is the Caroline County Confederate Monument. On August 25, 2020, the Caroline County Board of Supervisors voted unanimously to remove it.
