= Auburn–Harpswell Association Historic District =

Historic district in Maine, United States

- U.S. National Register of Historic Places
- U.S. Historic district
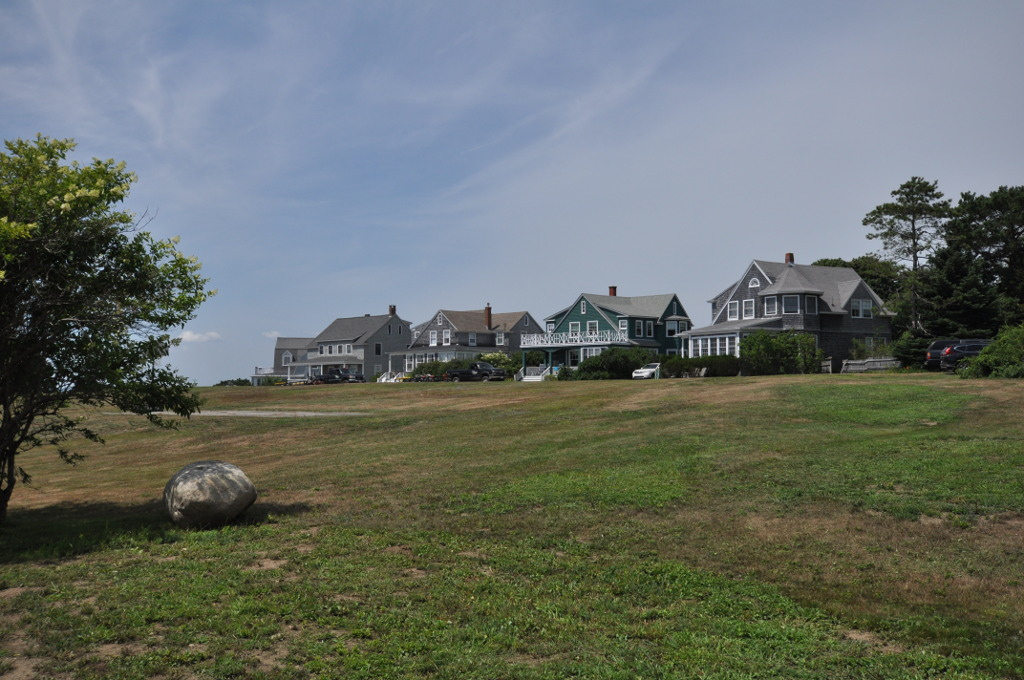

- Location within Maine Location within the United States
- Location: ME 123, South Harpswell, Maine
- Coordinates: 43°44′44″N 70°0′41.5″W
- Area: 12 acres (4.9 ha)
- Built: 1901
- Built by: Merriman, Leon Blake
- Architectural style: Colonial Revival, Shingle Style, Gothic Revival
- NRHP reference No.: 85000615
- Added to NRHP: March 21, 1985

The Auburn–Harpswell Association Historic District encompasses a well-preserved enclave of summer residences built in the early 20th century in southern Harpswell, Maine. The district includes ten Shingle style houses, a Colonial Revival dining hall, and a Greek Revival meeting hall. The Auburn Colony, an exclusive company of businessmen from Auburn, Maine, was responsible for their development. The district was listed on the National Register of Historic Places in 1985.

== Description and history ==
The town of Harpswell consists of several fingers of land, some of which are islands joined to the mainland by bridges, on the east side of Casco Bay on the southern coast of Maine. The principal western finger extends from Brunswick in the north to Potts Point at its very southern tip. Several miles north of Potts Point, in South Harpswell, the peninsula narrows sharply. On the west side of Harpswell Neck Road (Maine State Route 123) near this point is where the Auburn Colony is located. The main access road to the colony is located just south of a tennis court on the colony property. Lining a small network of roads in a roughly east–west orientation are the ten houses of the colony, with the two common buildings just to their north.

The Auburn Colony was founded in 1877 by a group of businessmen from Auburn, "for the purpose of securing the material advantage of society, health, and recreation." Twenty small Gothic Victorian cottages were built on the property they acquired, which were tragically destroyed by fire in 1899, although the two community buildings survived. The colony was rebuilt, with a reduced membership, resulting in construction ten 2 1/2-story Shingle style houses. Only three have known architects, all credited to the Lewiston firm of Coombs & Gibbs. In addition to the already-mentioned facilities, the association has a salt-water swimming pool and a small beach.

== See also ==
- National Register of Historic Places listings in Cumberland County, Maine
