= Auburndale, Alberta =

Unincorporated community in Alberta, Canada

Coordinates: 53.05015°N 110.86834°W

Auburndale is an unincorporated area in Alberta, Canada.

The community takes its name from Auburndale, Massachusetts, the native home of a first settler.
