= Auburn Union Elementary School District =

School district in California, United States

Address
- 255 Epperle Lane Auburn, California, 95603; United States
- Coordinates: 38.9°N 121.08°W

District information
- Type: Public
- Grades: K–8
- NCES District ID: 0603480

Students and staff
- Students: 1,741 (2020–2021)
- Teachers: 82.75 (FTE)
- Staff: 165.38 (FTE)
- Student–teacher ratio: 21.04:1

Other information
- Website: www.auburn.k12.ca.us

Auburn Union Elementary School District, California, USA, is composed of five schools: E.V. Cain Middle School, Rock Creek Elementary, Skyridge Elementary, Alta Vista Elementary, and Auburn Elementary. According to the accountability reports, there are 2600 students who go to the district. There were also 125 teachers in 2005.
