= Auburn Motor Chassis Company =

Defunct American motor vehicle manufacturer

- Industry: Manufacturing
- Founded: 1911; 115 years ago
- Defunct: 1916; 110 years ago
- Headquarters: Auburn, Indiana, US
- Products: Trucks, Automobiles

Auburn Motor Chassis Company of Auburn, Indiana, was a car and truck manufacturer.

== History ==
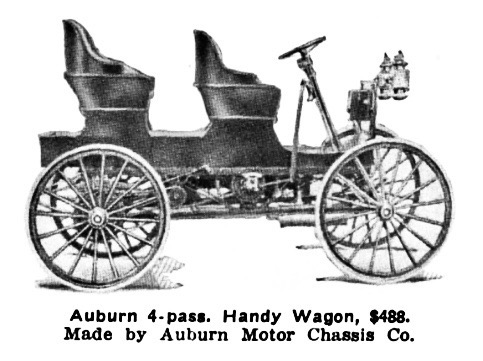
Auburn Four passenger Handy Wagon (1914)

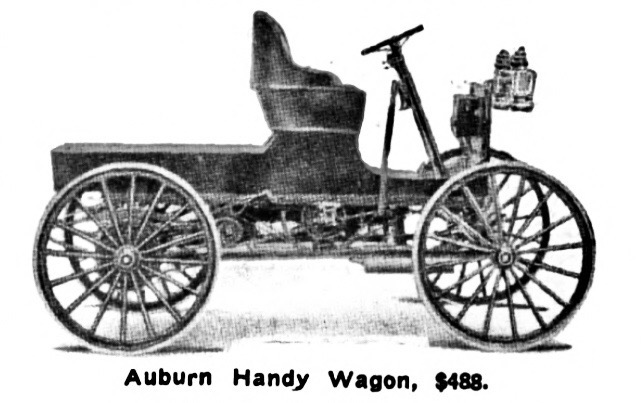
Auburn Handy delivery Wagon (1914)

The company, founded 1911, in Auburn, Indiana, manufactured trucks and cars under the brand name Auburn and Handy Wagon. In 1915, a two-cylinder vehicle for four people with 14 horsepower was available. The selling price was $488.

The Handy Wagon, produced from 1912 to 1915, had a 14-horsepower (10 kW) two-cylinder engine of 106.9 cu in (1,752 cc) displacement (4.13 in (105 mm) bore, 4.00 in (102 mm) stroke).

Two panel van versions of the Handy Wagon were available. The smaller variant had a 77-inch (2,000 mm) wheelbase and a payload of 800 lb (360 kg). The larger one had an 86-inch (2,200 mm) wheelbase and 1,200 lb (540 kg) payload, with a larger 168.3 cu in (2,758 cc) two-cylinder engine (4.75 in (121 mm) bore and stroke) producing 18 hp (13 kW).

There is no known connection to the better-known Auburn Automobile Company, which was based in the same city.
