= Auburn metropolitan area =

The Auburn metropolitan area may refer to:

- The Auburn, Alabama metropolitan area, United States
- The Auburn, New York micropolitan area, United States
- The Auburn, Indiana micropolitan area, United States

== See also ==
- Auburn (disambiguation)
