= Green Falls =

Historic house in Virginia, United States

- U.S. National Register of Historic Places
- Virginia Landmarks Register
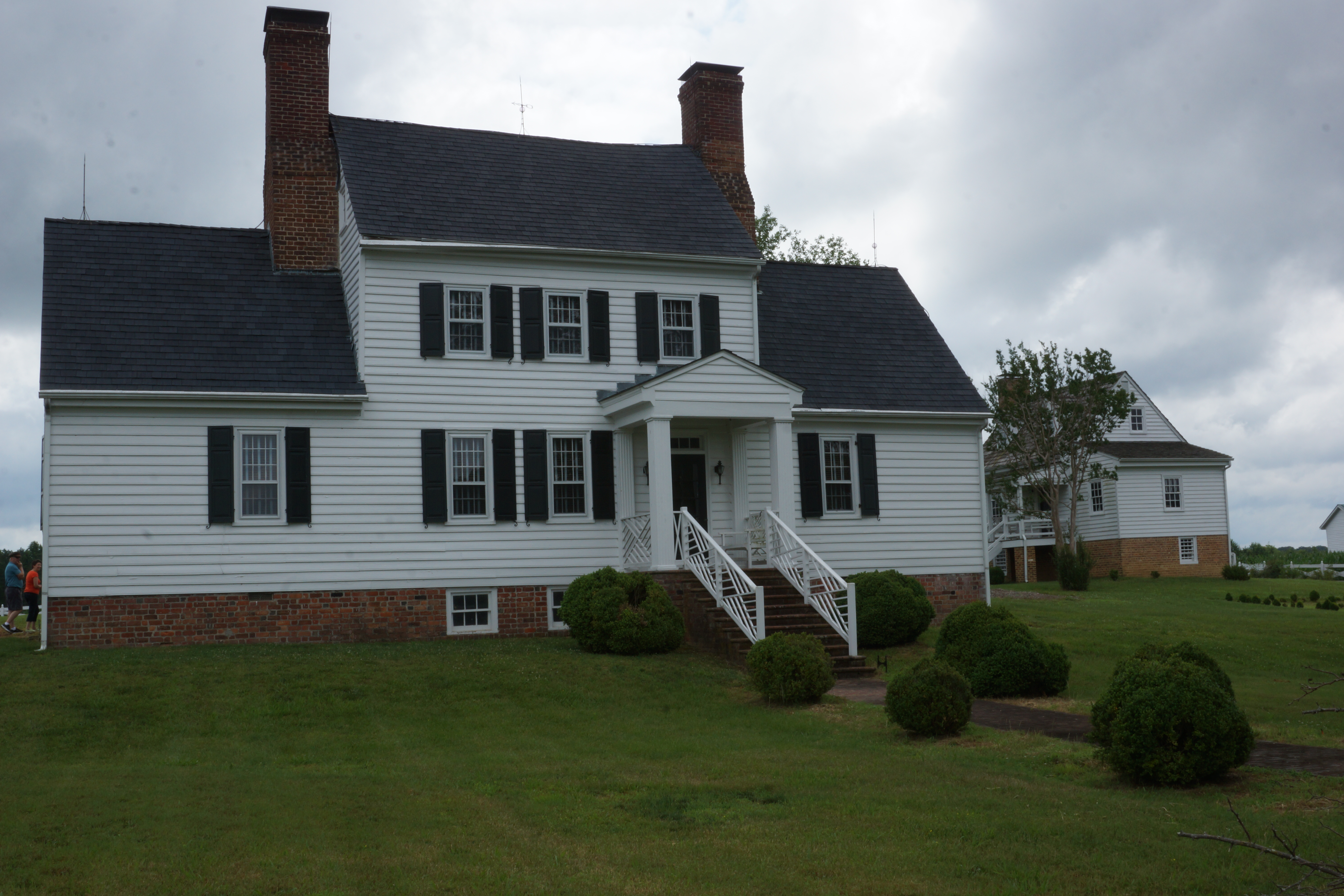

- Location within Virginia Location within the United States
- Location: Jct of VA 627 and VA 623, Bowling Green, Virginia
- Coordinates: 37°57′29″N 77°18′25″W
- Area: 361.5 acres (146.3 ha)
- Built: 1710
- Architectural style: Colonial
- NRHP reference No.: 97000485
- VLR No.: 016-0034

Significant dates
- Added to NRHP: May 23, 1997
- Designated VLR: March 19, 1997

Green Falls, also known as Johnston's Tavern, Turner's Store, Wright's Corner (Fork), and Dolly Wright's Corner, is a historic home located at Bowling Green, Caroline County, Virginia. It is believed to have been built about 1710 and dating to the Colonial period. The frame dwelling consists of a two-story, three-bay, single pile, central block flanked by one-story wings. It is considered by some historians to be the earliest surviving 18th century frame dwelling in Caroline County. The building housed a tavern in the 18th century, a store in the mid-19th century, and a post office from 1831 to 1859. It features massive brick exterior end chimneys. Also on the property is a contributing 18th century meat house, late-19th century carriage house, and early-20th century barn.

It was listed on the National Register of Historic Places in 1997.
