= Auburndale (town), Wisconsin =

Auburndale
- Town
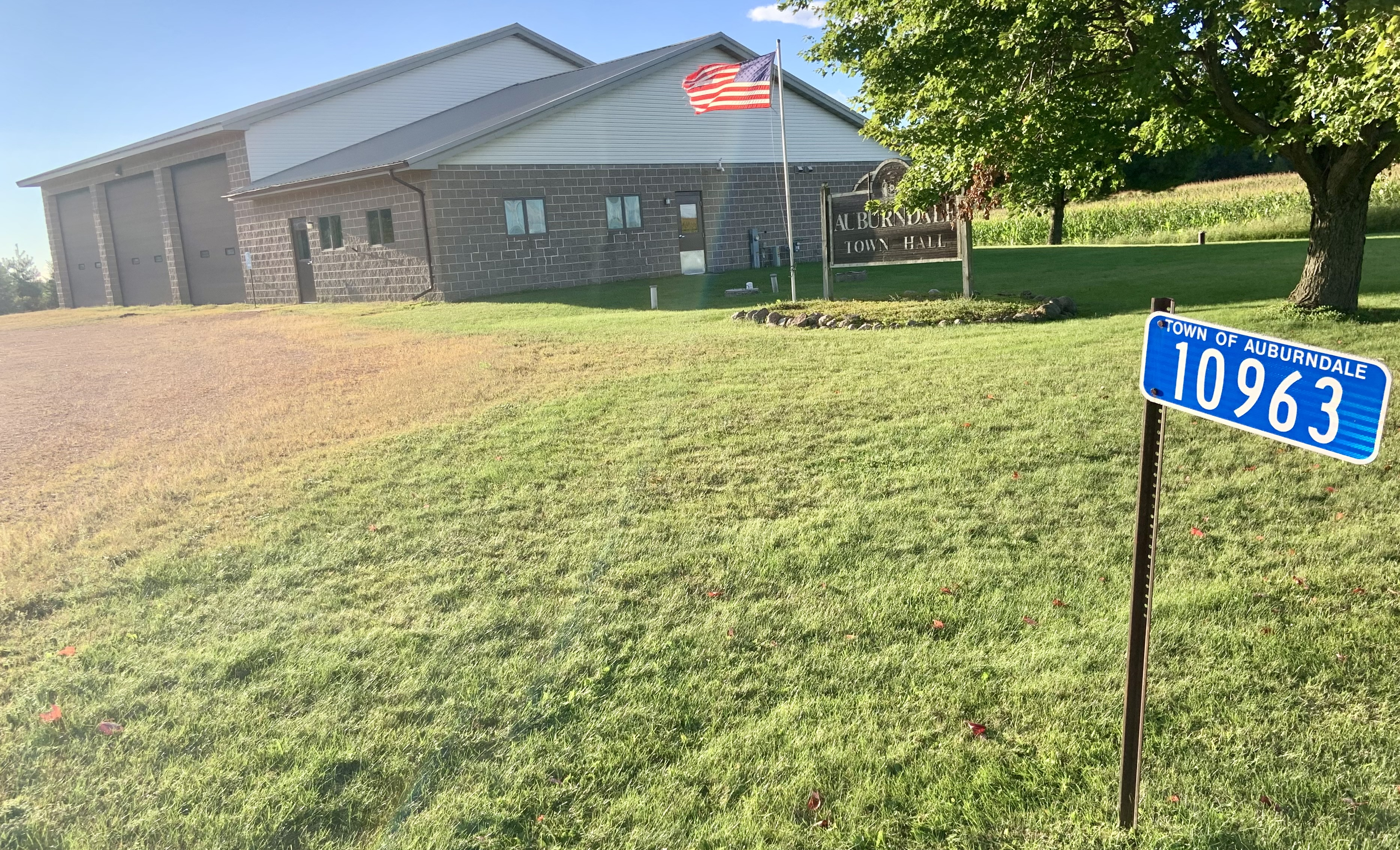
- Auburndale Town Hall

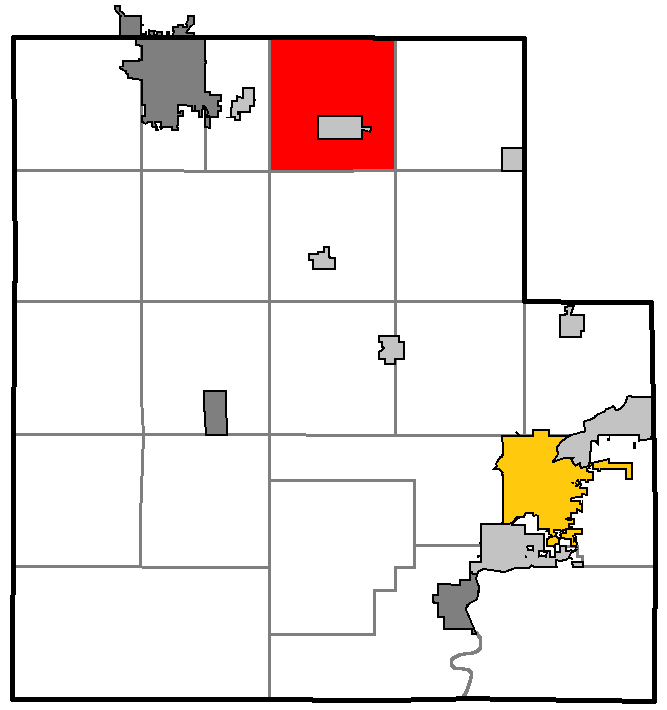
- Location of Auburndale within Wood County

- Location within the state of Wisconsin
- Coordinates: 44°37′39″N 90°0′41″W
- Country: United States
- State: Wisconsin
- County: Wood

Area
  - Total: 32.2 sq mi (83.5 km^{2})
  - Land: 32.2 sq mi (83.5 km^{2})

Population (2020)
  - Total: 790
  - Density: 25/sq mi (9.5/km^{2})
- Time zone: UTC-6 (Central (CST))
  - Summer (DST): UTC-5 (CDT)
- Area codes: 715 & 534
- PLSS township: T25N R4E
- Website: https://www.townofauburndale.com/

Auburndale is a town in Wood County, Wisconsin, United States. The population was 790 at the 2020 census. The Village of Auburndale is located within the town.

== Geography ==
Auburndale is roughly a square, six miles north to south and 5.75 miles east to west. According to the United States Census Bureau, the town has a total area of 32.2 square miles (83.5 km^{2}), all land.

== History ==
The outline of the six mile square that would become Auburndale was first surveyed in the summer of 1851 by a crew working for the U.S. government. In November and December 1852 another crew marked its section corners, walking through the woods and wading the streams, measuring with chain and compass. When done, the deputy surveyor filed this general description:

This Township contains no Marshes. It is generally heavily timbered chiefly with Hemlock, Sugar Yellow Birch, and Rock Elm. White Pine abounds on Mill Creek and some of the head Branches of the Little O'Plane. The surface is generally level about half is hardwood land where the soil is first and second rate. Mill Creek runs across the southwest corner of the Township and the north branch of the Little O'Plane rises in this township and runs out on the north side. They are both rapid streams but all the banks are too low for Mill purposes. Local attraction exists nearly all over the Township, but is strongest near the center. There are no improvements in the Township.

The Town of Auburndale was established in 1874, taking its name from the village of the same name within the town.

== Demographics ==
As of the census of 2000, there were 829 people, 299 households, and 235 families residing in the town. The population density was 25.7 people per square mile (9.9/km^{2}). There were 309 housing units at an average density of 9.6 per square mile (3.7/km^{2}). The racial makeup of the town was 99.28% White, 0.12% Black or African American, 0.24% Native American, and 0.36% from two or more races. None of the population is Hispanic or Latino of any race.

There were 299 households, out of which 37.1% had children under the age of 18 living with them, 70.6% were married couples living together, 3.7% had a female householder with no husband present, and 21.4% were non-families. 17.4% of all households were made up of individuals, and 7.0% had someone living alone who was 65 years of age or older. The average household size was 2.77 and the average family size was 3.16.

In the town, the population was spread out, with 26.4% under the age of 18, 6.8% from 18 to 24, 32.2% from 25 to 44, 20.5% from 45 to 64, and 14.1% who were 65 years of age or older. The median age was 36 years. For every 100 females, there were 115.9 males. For every 100 females age 18 and over, there were 110.3 males.

The median income for a household in the town was $40,815, and the median income for a family was $42,426. Males had a median income of $27,097 versus $22,500 for females. The per capita income for the town was $16,588. About 4.8% of families and 6.2% of the population were below the poverty line, including 7.9% of those under age 18 and 11.3% of those age 65 or over.
