= USS Auburn =

Two ships of the United States Navy have borne the name USS Auburn. The first was named for the town of Auburn, Pennsylvania, situated on a tributary of the Little Schuylkill River, Schuylkill County, Pennsylvania, northwest of Chester, Pennsylvania, where the ship was built. The second Auburn (AGC-10) was named for Mount Auburn, Massachusetts, just northwest of Cambridge, Massachusetts. The name itself was first found in Oliver Goldsmith's epic poem, "The Deserted Village" (1770).

- USS Auburn (ID-3842) was a cargo ship that was launched in 1918. She was commissioned on 24 January 1919, and then decommissioned on 22 February 1919. She remained in the United States Shipping Board fleet until about 1932–1933, when she was "abandoned ... due to age and deterioration."
- USS Auburn (AGC-10) was a Mount McKinley-class amphibious command ship. Originally named Katkay, the ship was launched in 1943. She was acquired by the Navy, converted, and renamed in 1944. She served in the War in the Pacific off Okinawa in 1945. Then after years of inactivity in the reserve fleet, USS Auburn was struck from the Naval List in 1960, and then scrapped in 1961.
