= Mount Auburn Cemetery (disambiguation) =

Mount Auburn Cemetery is a cemetery in Cambridge and Watertown, Massachusetts, United States.

Mount Auburn Cemetery may also refer to:

- Mount Auburn Cemetery (Harvard, Illinois), United States
- Mount Auburn Cemetery (Baltimore, Maryland), United States
- Mount Auburn Cemetery (Auburn, Maine), United States

== See also ==
- Mount Auburn Cemetery Reception House, an historic building located in the Cambridge, Massachusetts, portion of Mount Auburn Cemetery
