= Auburn School Department =

School district in Androscoggin County, Maine, United States

Location
- 60 Court St, Auburn (Androscoggin County) Maine 04210 United States
- Coordinates: 44.0973°N 70.2259°W

District information
- Type: Public
- Motto: Empowering life-long learners to succeed in a world yet imagined!
- Grades: Pre-kindergarten to grade 12
- Superintendent: Susan Dorris
- Schools: 8
- Budget: Approx. $40 million
- NCES District ID: 2302610

Students and staff
- Students: 3,577
- Teachers: 305.70 (on an FTE basis)
- Student–teacher ratio: 11.70

Other information
- Website: www.auburnschl.edu

The Auburn School Department is a school district that is part of the local town government of Auburn, Maine, United States, to see to the public school needs of the small city.

The department operates the following schools.

Primary/elementary Schools serving pre-kindegarten to grade 6, except as noted:

- East Auburn Community School
- Fairview Elementary School
- Park Avenue Elementary School
- Sherwood Heights Elementary School
- Walton Elementary School
- Washburn Elementary School

Junior high school serving grades 7 and 8:

- Auburn Middle School

High schools serving grades 9 to 12:

- Edward Little High School
- Franklin Alternative High School
