= Auburn (Bowling Green, Virginia) =

Historic house in Virginia, United States

- U.S. National Register of Historic Places
- Virginia Landmarks Register
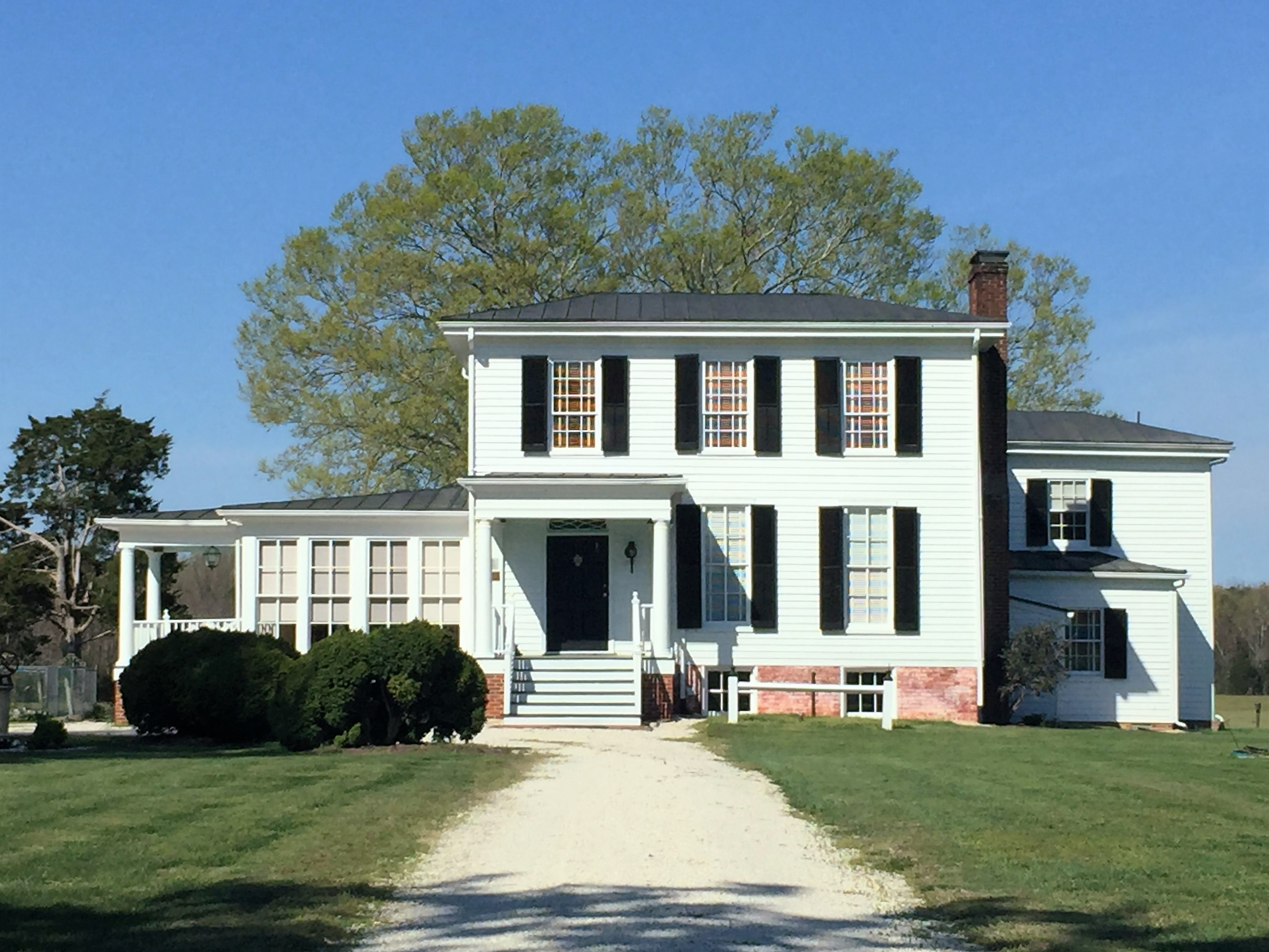

- Location within Virginia Location within the United States
- Location: 320 N. Main St., Bowling Green, Virginia
- Coordinates: 38°3′27″N 77°21′18″W
- Area: 17.3 acres (7.0 ha)
- Built: 1843
- Architectural style: Greek Revival
- NRHP reference No.: 06000342
- VLR No.: 171-0008

Significant dates
- Added to NRHP: May 3, 2006
- Designated VLR: March 8, 2006

Auburn is a historic home located at Bowling Green, Caroline County, Virginia. It was built about 1843, and is a two-story, three bay wide, frame dwelling in the Greek Revival style. It sits on a brick English basement. It has a two-story rear ell added in the late-19th century and a sunroom added about 1930. Also on the property is a contributing shed (c. 1940).

It was listed on the National Register of Historic Places in 2006.
