= Auburn (Brandy Station, Virginia) =

Historic house in Virginia, United States

- U.S. National Register of Historic Places
- Virginia Landmarks Register
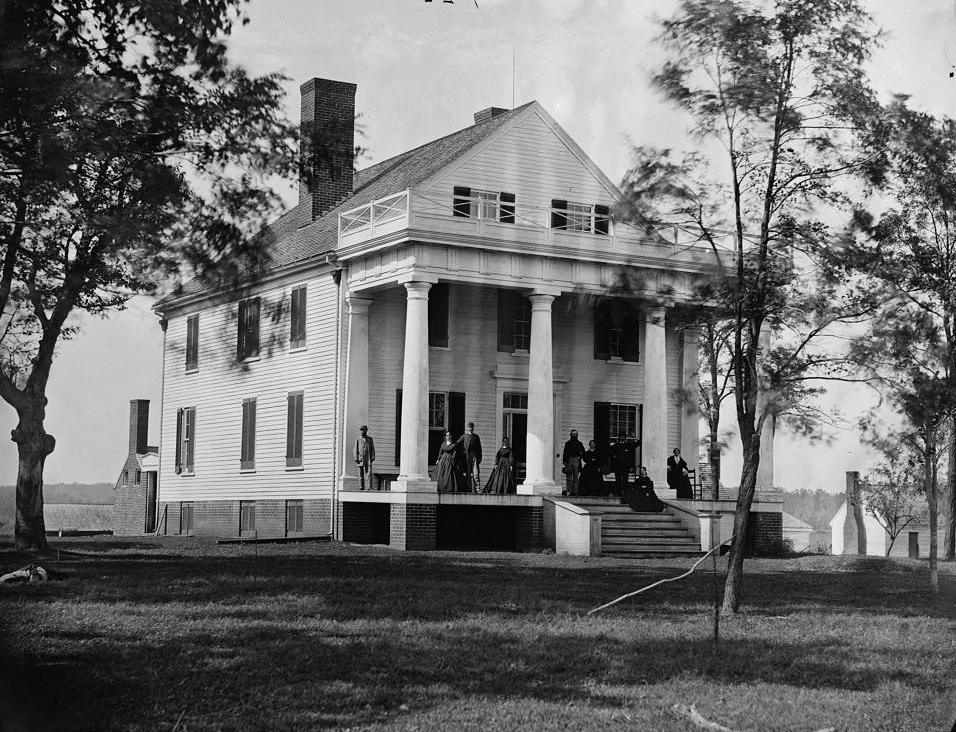
- Appearance in 1863, with Botts and his family

- Location within Virginia Location within the United States
- Location: 17736 Auburn Rd., Brandy Station, Virginia
- Coordinates: 38°30′18″N 77°55′39″W
- Area: 425 acres (172 ha)
- Built: c. 1855-1856
- Architectural style: Greek Revival
- NRHP reference No.: 08000068
- VLR No.: 023-0002

Significant dates
- Added to NRHP: February 21, 2008
- Designated VLR: December 5, 2007

Auburn, also known as Auburn Farm, is a historic home and farm located near Brandy Station, Culpeper County, Virginia. It was built about 1855–1856, and is a three-story, three bay by three bay frame dwelling, built in the Greek Revival style. It features a two-story portico with a heavy entablature including triglyph and metope frieze. Also on the property are the contributing kitchen (c. 1855–1856); 20th-century garage, chicken house, meat house, and machine shed; two barns; a large corncrib; and two tenant houses.

It was listed on the National Register of Historic Places in 2008.
