= Auburn Enlarged City School District =

School district in New York, United States

Location
- Auburn, New York United States

District information
- Motto: Working Together...Building A Community of Learners
- Grades: K-12
- Superintendent: Jeffrey Pirozzolo
- Asst. superintendent(s): Amy Mahunik (Instruction); Camille Johnson (Student Services); Sarah Cupelli (Personnel); Lisa Green (Business)
- Schools: 7

Students and staff
- Athletic conference: Section III
- District mascot: Maroons
- Colors: Maroon and White

Other information
- Website: www.aecsd.education

Auburn Enlarged City School District is a school district headquartered in Auburn, New York, United States.

It includes almost all of the City of Auburn as well as the census-designated place of Melrose Park.

The district operates seven schools: Auburn High School, Auburn Junior High School, Casey Park Elementary School, Genesee Elementary School, Herman Avenue Elementary School, Owasco Elementary School, and Seward Elementary School.

== Administration ==
The District Office is located 78 Thornton Avenue. The current superintendent is Jeffrey Pirozzolo.

=== Selected Former Superintendents ===
- William A. Miller
- John B. Plume–?-2005

== Auburn High School ==
Auburn High School

Information
- Principal: Brian Morgan
- Grades: 9-12
- Website: Auburn High School

Auburn High School is located at 250 Lake Ave and serves grades 9 through 12. The current principal is Brian Morgan.

== Auburn Junior High School ==
Auburn Junior High School

Information
- Type: Public, Coeducational
- Principal: David Oliver
- Grades: 7-8
- Website: Auburn Junior High School

Auburn Junior High School is located at 191 Franklin Street and serves grades 7 and 8. The current principal is David Oliver.

== Casey Park Elementary School ==
Casey Park Elementary School

Information
- Type: Public, Coeducational
- Principal: Kelly Garback
- Grades: K-6
- Website: Casey Park Elementary School

Casey Park Elementary School is located at 101 Pulaski Street and serves grades K through 6. The current principal is Kelly Garback.

== Genesee Elementary School ==
Genesee Elementary School

Information
- Type: Public, Coeducational
- Principal: Sarah Green
- Grades: K-6
- Website: Genesee Elementary School

Genesee Elementary School is located at 244 Genesee Street and serves grades K through 6. The current principal is Sarah Green.

== Herman Avenue Elementary School ==
Herman Avenue Elementary School

Information
- Type: Public, Coeducational
- Principal: Ronald Gorney
- Grades: K-6
- Website: Herman Avenue Elementary School

Herman Avenue Elementary School is located at 2 North Herman Avenue and serves grades K through 6. The current principal is Ronald Gorney.

== Owasco Elementary School ==
Owasco Elementary School

Information
- Type: Public, Coeducational
- Principal: Laura Evans
- Grades: K-6
- Website: Owasco Elementary School

Owasco Elementary School is located at 66 Letchworth Street and serves grades K through 6. The current principal is Laura Evans.

== William H. Seward Elementary School ==
William H. Seward Elementary School

Information
- Type: Public, Coeducational
- Grades: K-6
- Website: Seward Elementary School

Seward Elementary School is located at 52 Metcalf Drive and serves grades K through 6. The current principal is Amy Mahunik.
