= Auburn High School (New York) =

Location
- 250 Lake Ave; Auburn, New York 13021; United States
- 42°54′35″N 76°32′54″W

Information
- Type: Public
- Established: 1970
- School district: Auburn Enlarged City School District
- NCES School ID: 360348000101
- Principal: Brian Morgan
- Teaching staff: 85.1 (on an FTE basis)
- Grades: 9-12
- Enrollment: 1,176 (2024-2025)
- Student to teacher ratio: 13.48
- Campus: Rural: Distant
- Colors: Maroon and White
- Mascot: Maroons
- Feeder schools: Auburn Junior High School
- Website: aecsd.education/highschool

Auburn High School is the only public high school in Auburn, New York, U.S., a city approximately 25 miles southwest of Syracuse in central New York.

As of the 2024-25 school year, the school had an enrollment of 1,176 students and 85.1 classroom teachers (on an FTE basis), for a student–teacher ratio of 13.8:1. There were 647 students (55.4% of enrollment) eligible for free lunch and 12 (1% of students) eligible for reduced-cost lunch.

== Athletics ==
The school's mascot is the Auburn Maroons. The school competes in Section III.

Varsity boys sports include football, basketball, baseball, ice hockey, soccer, lacrosse, wrestling, swimming, golf, tennis, cross country, bowling, and track.

Varsity girls sports include golf, soccer, basketball, softball, swimming, cheerleading, field hockey, tennis, volleyball, cross country, bowling, lacrosse, and track.

Home varsity football games are played at Holland Stadium, which is located at Auburn Junior High School on Franklin Street. Home varsity baseball games are played at Falcon Park, home of the Auburn Doubledays minor league baseball team, on North Division Street.

== Notable alumni ==
- Amy Dacey (class of 1989), former CEO of the Democratic National Committee
- Joey DeMaio (born 1954), Manowar bassist
- Buddy Hardeman (born 1954), NFL player
- Joe Kehoskie (born 1973), baseball agent
- Martin E. Lind (1931–2018), US Army major general
- Tim Locastro (born 1992), MLB player
- Brian P. McKeon (born 1964), attorney
- Jeremy Morin (born 1991), NHL player
- Kevin Polcovich (born 1970, class of 1988), MLB player
- Walter G. Robinson (1879–1940, class of 1895), Adjutant General of New York
- Bob Socci, sports broadcaster
- Emma Paddock Telford (1851-1920, class of 1869), writer
- Chris Viscardi, TV and film writer
- Charles Barker Wheeler (1851–1935), New York Supreme Court justice

== Auburn Alumni Hall of Distinction ==
In 2012, the Auburn Education Foundation launched the Auburn Alumni Hall of Distinction, which will honor notable graduates of Auburn High School and its predecessor high schools.

The following alumni were inducted in 2012:

- Alfred "Al" Emmi (West High School, Class of 1953)
- Dr. Joseph F. Karpinski Sr., D.D.S. (East High School, Class of 1942)
- Harold "Hal" Morse, Ph.D. (East High School, Class of 1955)
- Barbara L. Smith, M.D., Ph.D. (Auburn High School, Class of 1973)
- Christopher Viscardi (Auburn High School, Class of 1980)

The following alumni were inducted in 2013:

- Amy Dacey (Auburn High School, Class of 1989)
- Maj. Gen. John A. "Jack" Leide (East High School, Class of 1954)
- Gerard "Gerry" Martin (Central High School, Class of 1965)
- Linda Ann Townsend (Auburn High School, Class of 1971)

The following alumni were inducted in 2014:

- Bob Foresman (Auburn High School, Class of 1986)
- Bill Fox (East High School, Class of 1959) and Jane Fox (East High School, Class of 1963)
- Carol (Shepardson) Colvin (Auburn High School, Class of 1978)

The following alumni were inducted in 2015:

- Gino Alberici (West High School, Class of 1954)
- John Bouck (East High School, Class of 1959)
- Matt DelPiano (Auburn High School, Class of 1987)
- Jay Goldman (Auburn High School, Class of 1974)
- Suzanne Orofino Galbato (Auburn High School, Class of 1991)
- Stephan Wasylko (West High School, Class of 1966)

The following alumni were inducted in 2016:

- Melina Carnicelli (West High School, Class of 1966)
- Kenneth Davis (Auburn High School, Class of 1983)
- Robert Dorsey (Auburn High School, Class of 1976)
- Thomas Lewis (Auburn High School, Class of 1976)
- Amy Rankin (Auburn High School, Class of 1999)
- Barry Tharp, M.D. (East High School, Class of 1954)

The following alumni were inducted in 2017:

- Richard ("Dick") Dickman and Dorothy Dickman (East High School, Class of 1951)
- William Fulton (Auburn High School, Class of 1973)
- Anthony Gucciardi (West High School, Class of 1959)
- Christopher Prentice (Auburn High School, Class of 1988)
- Dr. Robert Vince (East High School, Class of 1958)

The following alumni were inducted in 2018:

- Pauline Copes Johnson (West High School, Class of 1945)
- Kevin Corcoran (Auburn High School, Class of 1972)
- Dr. Larry Ellison (Auburn High School, Class of 1971)
- Kevin Murphy (Auburn High School, Class of 1997)
- Dr. Peter Usowski (Auburn High School, Class of 1973)
- Thommie Walsh (East High School, Class of 1968)
