= Auburn House (Towson, Maryland) =

Historic house in Maryland

- U.S. National Register of Historic Places
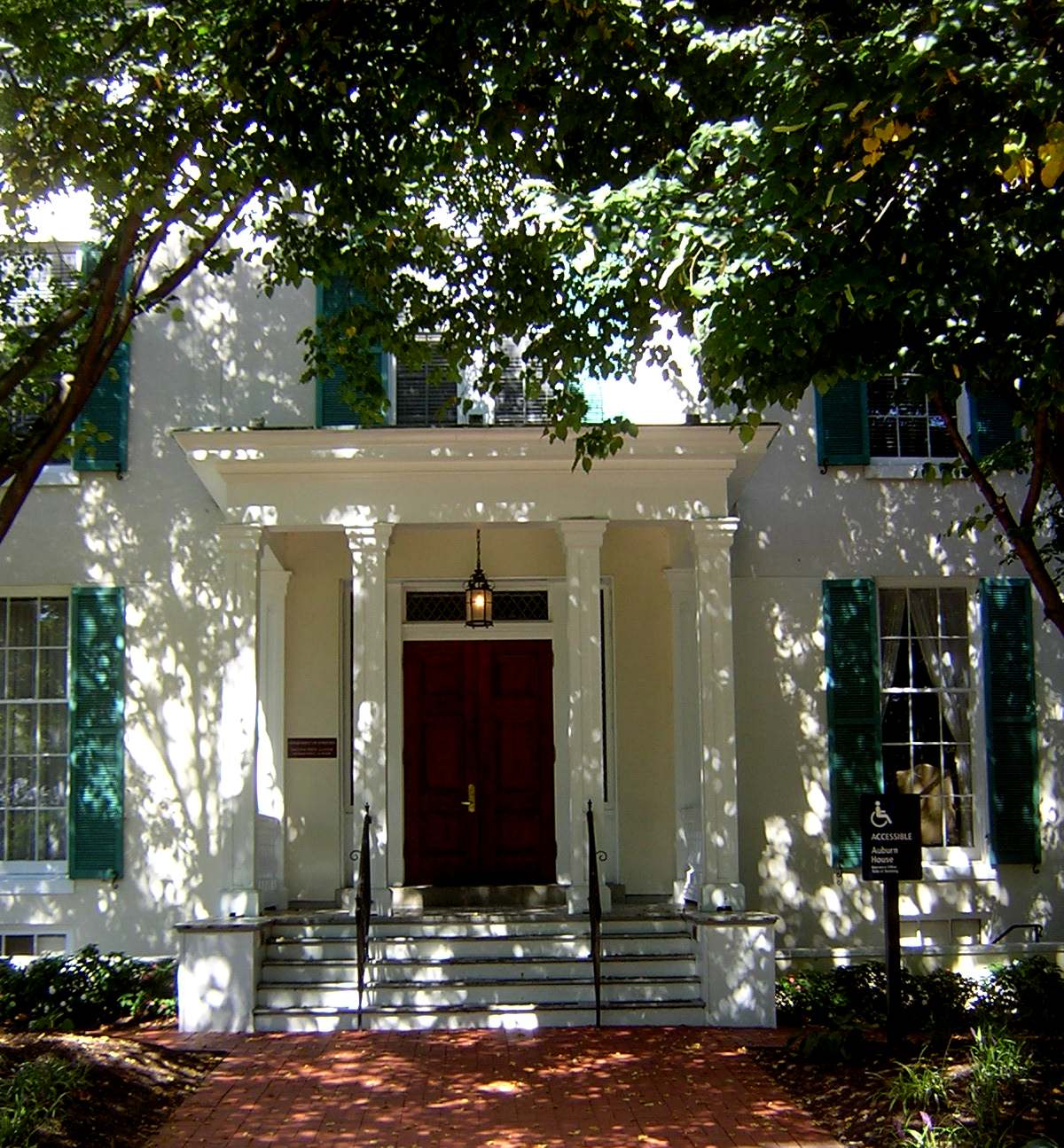

- Location within Maryland Location within the United States
- Location: Auburn Dr., off of Osler Drive between Towsontown Boulevard and Stevenson Lane (7500 Osler Drive), Towson, Maryland
- Coordinates: 39°23′10″N 76°36′50″W
- Area: 2 acres (0.81 ha)
- Built: 1849
- Architectural style: Greek Revival
- NRHP reference No.: 75000869
- Added to NRHP: March 17, 1975

Auburn House is a historic home located on the grounds of Towson University in Towson, Baltimore County, Maryland, United States. It was built in 1790 by Charles Ridgely III and stayed in the family until it became part of the Sheppard and Enoch Pratt Hospital property in 1944. Towson University (then Towson State College) acquired the house in 1971.

The building currently serves as the home of the executive offices of the Department of Athletics.

The National Register listing shows it having been built in 1849, but it also says that Rebecca Dorsey Ridgely, wife of Charles Ridgely III, lived there from 1791 to 1812. The listing calls it Greek Revival, but 1791 is well before the Greek Revival period in the United States. Towson University calls it "an important example of Italianate–Federal architecture".

It is a rectangular three story stone structure faced with scored stucco. The front is three bays, with ground floor windows, six over nine, and the full height of the front door. The next story is also six over nine, but not as tall, and the top floor windows are the same size as the upper sash of the floor below. The interior is elegant, including acanthus pattern cornices, Italian marble mantels, graceful chandeliers, and a carved mahogany balustrade. The two story addition on the southwest side was built in the 1920s.

Auburn House was added to the National Register of Historic Places on March 17, 1975, reference number 75000869.

== Gallery ==
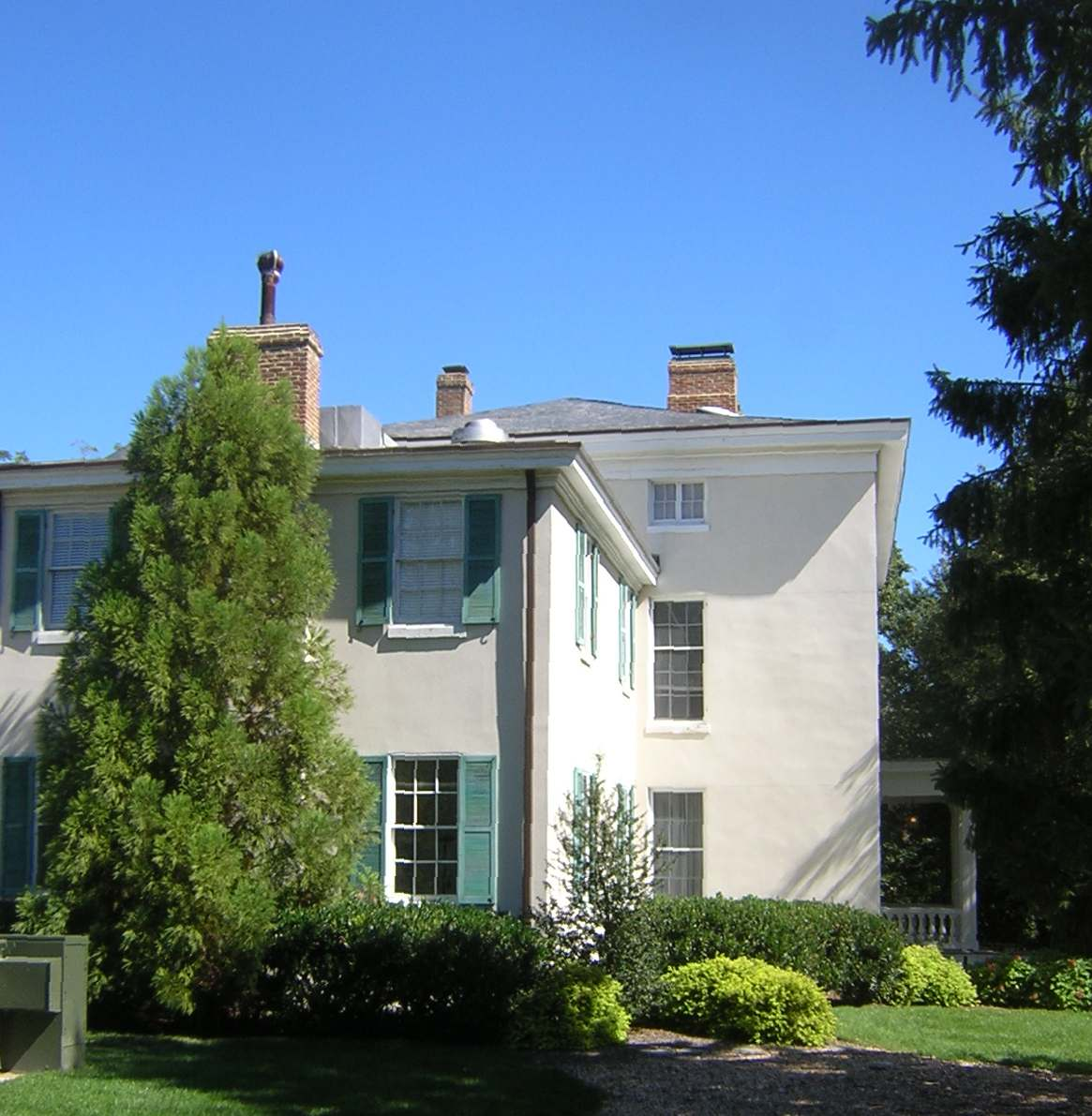
Southwest side, added in 1920s

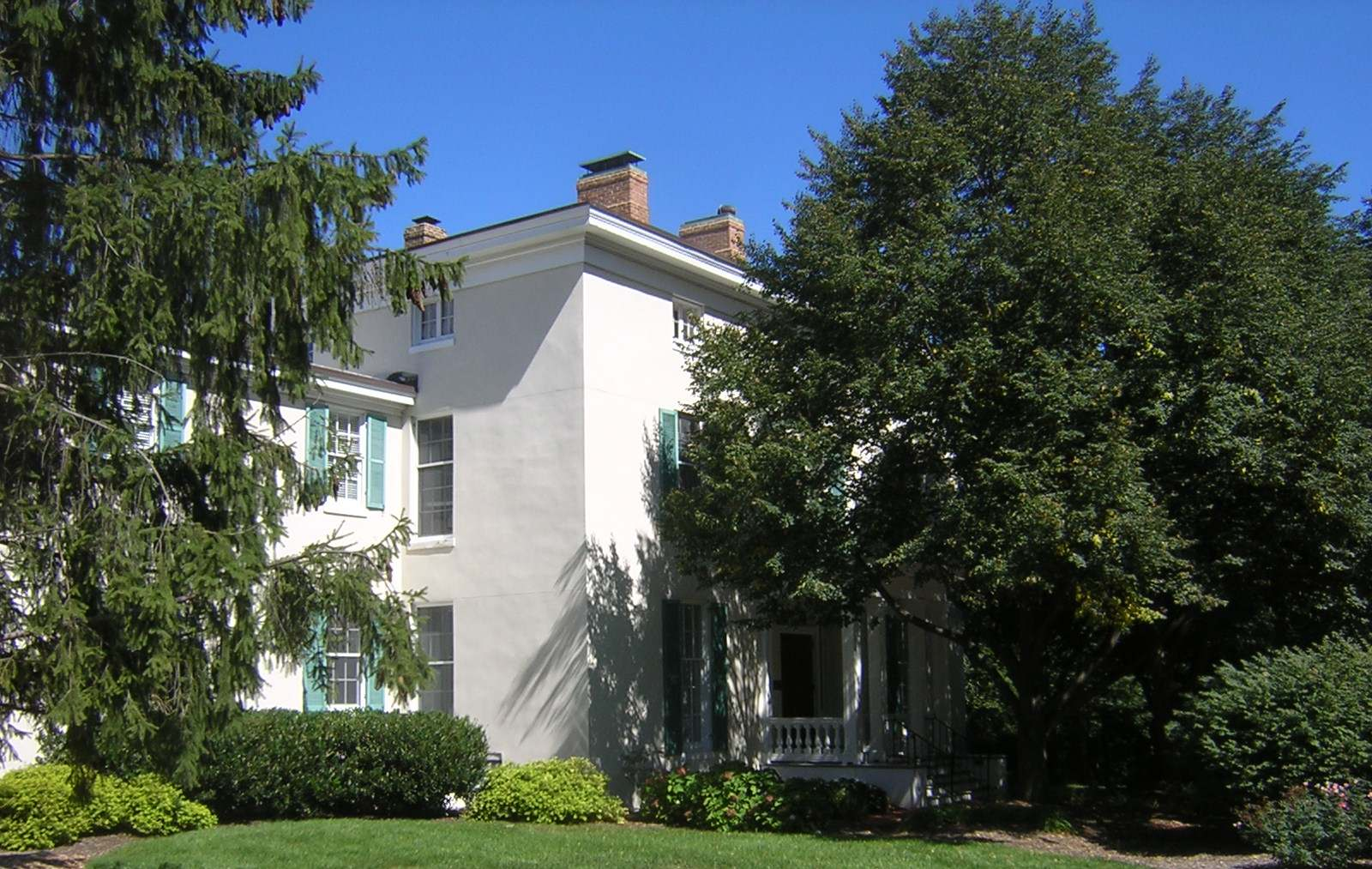
Southeast side

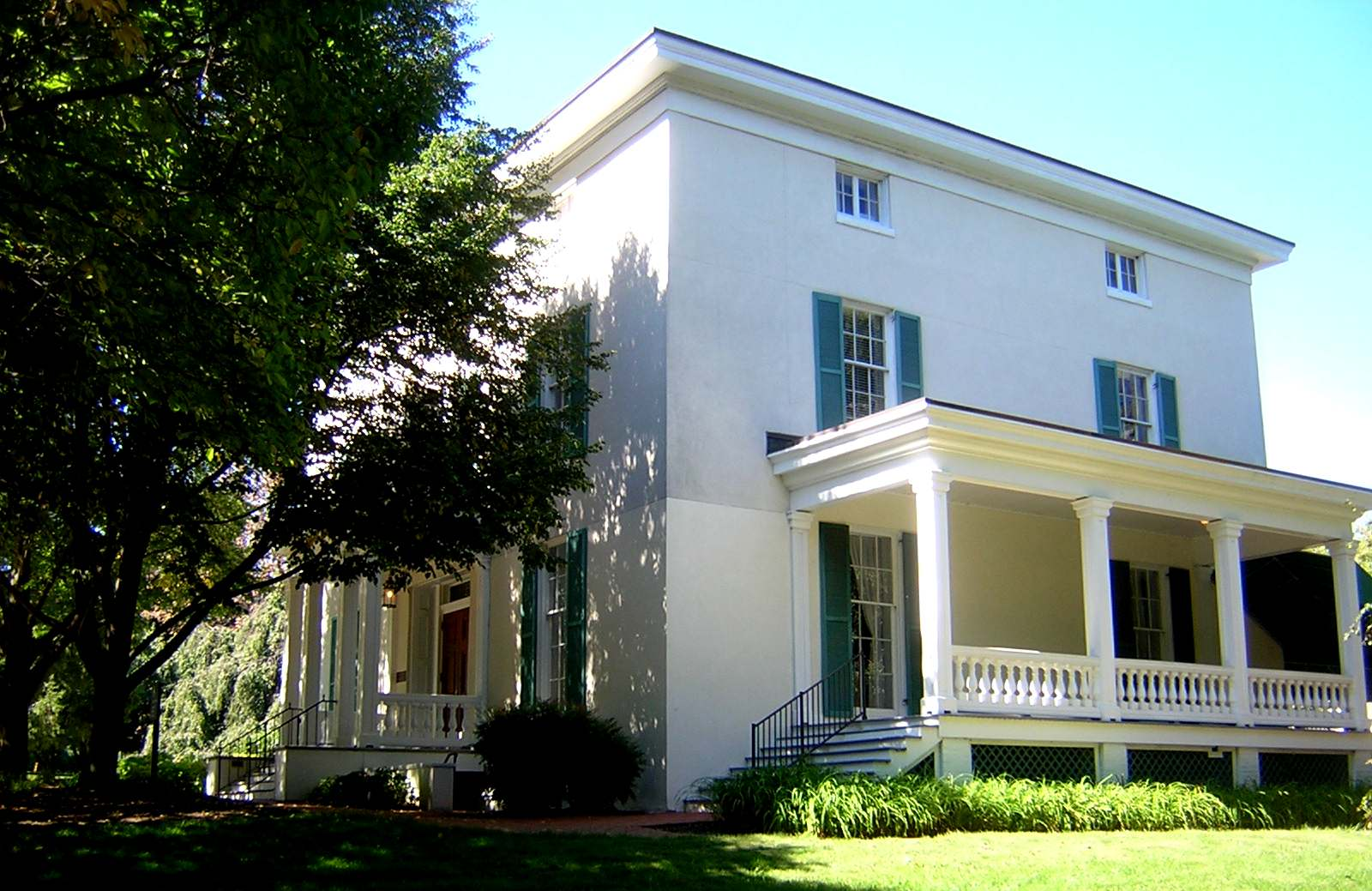
Northeast side
