= Ronald C. Brock =

Adjutant General of New York (1957–1959)

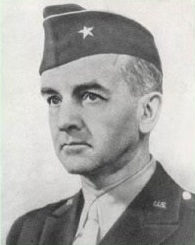
- Brock as a brigadier general in 1946
- Born: 25 June 1895; Coudersport, Pennsylvania, US
- Died: 24 October 1984 (aged 89); Boca Raton, Florida, US
- Burial place: Boca Raton Municipal Cemetery and Mausoleum, Boca Raton, Florida, US
- Education: Mansfield Normal School (attended); United States Army Command and General Staff College; United States Army War College
- Spouse(s): Mabel Ruth Beers (m. 1917–1935) Josephine Darling Holbrook (m. 1935–1962) Jane Weaver Koch (m. 1963–1966) Rosemarie C. Hill (m. 1967–1984)
- Military career
- Service: United States Army
- Service years: 1917–1919, 1940–1946 (Army); 1917, 1921–1940, 1946–1959 (National Guard)
- Rank: Major General (Army); Lieutenant General (Retired list)
- Service number: O242225
- Unit: US Army Field Artillery Branch
- Commands: Battery A, 106th Field Artillery Regiment; 3rd Battalion, 106th Field Artillery Regiment; 106th Field Artillery Regiment; 52nd Field Artillery Brigade; 106th Infantry Division Artillery; 65th Infantry Division Artillery; 27th Infantry Division; 27th Armored Division; Adjutant General of New York
- Conflicts: World War I Occupation of the Rhineland; World War II; Allied-occupied Germany
- Awards: Legion of Merit (2); World War I Victory Medal; World War II Victory Medal; New York State Conspicuous Service Medal; Order of the Patriotic War (First Class) (Soviet Union)
- Other work: Area director, New York State Division of Veterans' Services

Ronald C. Brock (25 June 1895 – 24 October 1984) was an American military officer from New York. He served in the United States Army for over 40 years, primarily as a member of the New York National Guard. Brock was a veteran of World War I and World War II and his command assignments included the 106th Field Artillery Regiment, 65th Infantry Division Artillery, 27th Infantry Division, and 27th Armored Division. From 1957 until his 1959 retirement Brock served as Adjutant General of New York. He attained the rank of major general during his career; he was later promoted to lieutenant general on New York's retired list as a commendation of his long service.

Brock was a native of Coudersport, Pennsylvania and was raised and educated in the Coudersport area. In 1916, he moved to Buffalo, New York, where he worked for his father's printing business and several other Buffalo companies while pursuing a military career. In 1917, he enlisted in New York National Guard's Battery B, 3rd Field Artillery Regiment, which was federalized for World War I as the 106th Field Artillery. He was a sergeant at the end of the war. In 1921, he was commissioned as a second lieutenant in the reconstituted 106th Field Artillery and he advanced through the ranks to become the regimental executive officer.

At the start of World War II, Brock was assigned to command the regiment. He later commanded the 52nd Field Artillery Brigade, 106th Infantry Division Artillery, and 65th Infantry Division Artillery, and took part in combat in Europe. After the war, he commanded the 27th Infantry Division and 27th Armored Division. From 1957 to 1959, he served as adjutant general of New York.

== Early life and civilian career ==
Ronald Cornelius Brock was born in Coudersport, Pennsylvania on 25 June 1895, a son of Claude Cornelius Brock and Anna Belle (Pitts) Brock. (Note: Brock's first name is given as "Roland" in some sources and "Ronald" in others. Ronald is used most often.) He was educated in Coudersport and graduated from Elkland High School. He attended Mansfield Normal School in Mansfield, Pennsylvania before moving to Buffalo, New York, where he was employed in his father's printing business, then at the Buffalo Pierce-Arrow Motor Car Company factory.

Following the First World War, Brock worked as a Pierce-Arrow purchasing agent, then went on to an accountant's position with the King Sewing Machine Company, followed by the general manager's position at the Ford Vending Machine Company. From 1931 to 1935, Brock assisted in the management of his father's printing business. In 1935, he was appointed general manager of New York's Temporary Emergency Relief Agency, a Great Depression office created to provide direct aid and jobs to destitute residents.

In 1937, Brock joined the federal Works Progress Administration as supervisor of intake interviewers in the Buffalo area. In 1939, Brock was promoted to WPA Buffalo area supervisor in charge of personnel intake and certification. Following his Second World War service, Brock was appointed Buffalo area director for the New York State Division of Veterans' Services.

== Start of military career ==
In July 1917, Brock embarked on a military career when he enlisted as a private in the New York National Guard's Battery B, 3rd Field Artillery Regiment. In October 1917, he was promoted to corporal and entered active duty for World War I as a member of the redesignated 106th Field Artillery Regiment. He served with Battery B, 106th Field Artillery Regiment during organization and training at Camp Upton, New York, then served in combat in France beginning in June 1918. He was promoted to sergeant soon after arriving in France, and was still serving with the 106th Field Artillery when the Armistice of November 11, 1918 ended the war. Brock took part in the post-war Occupation of the Rhineland until returning to the United States in March 1919. He was discharged from the military on 31 March.

In April 1921, Brock returned to military service when he was commissioned as a second lieutenant of Field Artillery. Assigned to Battery F, 3rd Battalion of the reconstituted 106th Field Artillery Regiment, he was promoted to first lieutenant in November. In May 1922, he was promoted to captain and assigned to command the 106th Artillery's Battery A, 1st Battalion. In February 1927, he was promoted to major and assigned to command 3rd Battalion. In June 1929, Brock was promoted to lieutenant colonel and assigned as the executive officer and second-in-command of the 106th Field Artillery. Brock continued to serve as executive officer of the 106th until July 1940; following the death of the longtime regimental commander in June, Brock was promoted to colonel and appointed to the position.

== Continued military career ==
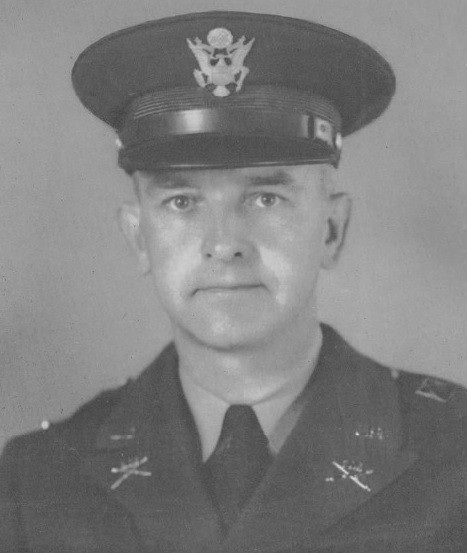
Brock as a colonel during World War II

In October 1940, Brock led the 106th Field Artillery Regiment to Fort McClellan after the 27th Infantry Division, including the 106th Field Artillery, was mobilized for a year of training in anticipation of U.S. entry into World War II. Brock continued in command during the regiment's organization and training, including participation in Second United States Army maneuvers near Prescott, Arkansas during the summer of 1941. In November 1941, Brock was assigned temporarily to command the 106th Field Artillery's higher headquarters, the 52nd Field Artillery Brigade. In spring 1942, Brock continued in command of the 106th Field Artillery Regiment during its ongoing training at Fort Ord, California and subsequent deployment to Hawaii Territory. In March 1943, Brock was promoted to brigadier general.

After his promotion to the general officer ranks, Brock was assigned to command the 106th Infantry Division Artillery with Colonel Malin Craig Jr., son of former US Army Chief of Staff Malin Craig as executive officer and second in command. The 106th Infantry Division was activated at Fort Jackson, South Carolina on 15 March 1943. Brock led the division artillery during its organization and training until December 1943, when he was succeeded by Leo T. McMahon. While his organizations underwent organization and training in the United States, the individual training Brock completed included United States Army Ordnance Corps weapons and vehicle maintenance courses at Fort Sill, Oklahoma and Fort Holabird, Maryland. In addition, he completed a United States Army War College course for senior officers at Aberdeen Proving Ground, Maryland.

Following his service with the 106th Infantry Division, Brock was assigned to command the 65th Infantry Division Artillery. This organization organized and trained at Camp Shelby, Mississippi from August 1943 to January 1945, when it arrived in France and entered combat in the Rhineland and Central Europe campaigns. Brock remained in command through the end of European combat in May 1945. The 65th Division crossed the Danube near Regensburg, Germany on 26 April 1945 and seized the city the next day. The division went on to seize Passau, Germany, crossed the Enns River on 4 May, and occupy Linz, Austria on 5 May. When combat ended on 9 May, the 65th Division made contact with troops of the Soviet Union near Strengberg and Erlauf, Austria. The 65th Infantry Division was inactivated in August, after which Brock took part in the post-war occupation in Wasserburg am Inn, Germany, where he interviewed German generals about their wartime experiences as part of a War Department Historical Commission initiative to document the war. Brock returned to the United States in late 1945 and was discharged from active duty in February 1946.

== Later military career ==
After assisting in the reconstitution and reorganization of the National Guard after the war, in December 1946, Brock was assigned as assistant division commander of the 27th Infantry Division. In June 1948, Brock was appointed to succeed Bernard W. Kearney as commander of the division, and he was promoted to major general in July. In May 1950, Brock was one of three senior 27th Infantry Division leaders who completed the course for senior leaders at the United States Army Command and General Staff College. In 1951, Brock was one of the general officers tasked with leading the reconstitution of the New York Guard; the volunteer organization was scheduled to be disbanded after World War II, but the start of the Korean War demonstrated a continued need.

In 1955, Cold War requirements for more armor units to stop a potential Soviet invitation of Western Europe led to the reorganization of the 27th Infantry Division as the 27th Armored Division, and Brock was appointed to command the new unit. In January 1957, Brock was appointed to succeed Karl F. Hausauer as adjutant general of New York. (Note: In most states, the head of the National Guard is the adjutant general; the title for New York's National Guard head was chief of staff to the governor beginning in 1950. In 1988, the title was changed back to adjutant general.) He continued to serve in this position until retiring in July 1959; he was succeeded by Almerin C. O'Hara. At his retirement, Brock was promoted to lieutenant general on the state's retired list; the appointment was confirmed by the state senate in February 1960. Brock was a Shriner and a member of the Buffalo Drum Corps. He was also a member of the American Legion. After retiring, Brock continued to reside in the Buffalo area until 1975, when he moved to Boca Raton, Florida. He died in Boca Raton on 29 October 1984. He was buried at Boca Raton Municipal Cemetery and Mausoleum. There is also a cenotaph in his name at the Williamsville Cemetery burial location of his wife Josephine in Williamsville, New York.

== Awards ==
Brock's federal awards included the Legion of Merit with oak leaf cluster, World War I Victory Medal, and World War II Victory Medal. His state awards included the New York State Conspicuous Service Medal and the first ever award of the 40-year New York State Long and Faithful Service Medal. His foreign decorations included the Order of the Patriotic War (First Class) from the Soviet Union.

=== First Legion of Merit citation ===
"For exceptional initiative, untiring energy and sound military judgment in welding together a well-ordered and smooth-functioning division artillery team. Under his superb leadership this command rendered valuable support to the assault units of this division both during the breaching of the Siegfried Line and the aggressive pursuit after the initial breakthrough."

From: January 10 to March 25, 1945. Unit: 65th Infantry Division Artillery.

== Family ==
During Brock's career, he resided at different times in Buffalo and in several nearby towns, including Kenmore, Tonawanda, and Amherst. In 1917, Brock married Mabel Ruth Beers; they divorced in 1935. Later that year, he married Josephine Darling Holbrook; they were married until her death in 1962. Brock married Jane Weaver Koch, the sister of US Representative James D. Weaver, in 1963 and they remained married until her death in 1966. Brock married Rosemarie C. Hill in 1967 and they remained married until his death.

== Dates of rank ==
- Private, 11 July 1917
- Corporal, 12 October 1917
- Sergeant, 20 June 1918
- Second Lieutenant, 14 April 1921
- First Lieutenant, 15 November 1921
- Captain, 23 May 1922
- Major, 8 February 1927
- Lieutenant Colonel, 4 June 1929
- Colonel, 30 July 1940
- Brigadier General, 25 March 1943
- Major General, 27 July 1948
- Lieutenant General (New York retired list), 8 February 1960
