= SS Maritime Victory =

Victory ship of the United States

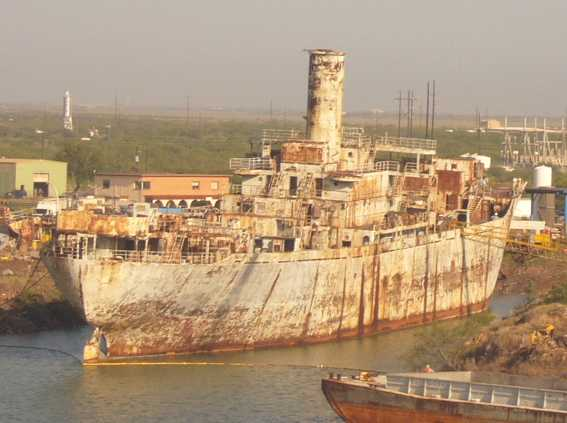
- Maritime Victory at Brownsville, Texas, June 2006

History

United States
- Name: Maritime Victory; Pvt. Frederick C. Murphy (10 February 1950 –)
- Builder: Bethlehem-Fairfield Shipyard, Baltimore
- Launched: May 1945
- Acquired: 18 June 1945
- Renamed: USAT Pvt. Frederick C. Murphy, 1950
- Identification: IMO number: 8636049
- Fate: Scrapped 25 May 2006

General characteristics
- Type: Victory ship
- Displacement: 7,607 long tons (7,729 t)
- Length: 455 ft (139 m)
- Beam: 62 ft (19 m)
- Draft: 28 ft 6 in (8.69 m)
- Propulsion: Allis-Chalmers cross-compound steam turbine with double reduction gears, 6,000 hp (4,474 kW) at 100 rpm
- Speed: 17 kn (31 km/h; 20 mph)
- Range: 23,500 mi (37,800 km)
- Capacity: 500,000 cu ft (14,000 m^{3}) (approx.)
- Complement: 62 Merchant Marine and Navy Armed Guard
- Armament: 1 × 5-inch stern gun; 1 × 3-inch bow anti-aircraft gun; 8 × Oerlikon 20 mm cannon

USAT Maritime Victory

SS Maritime Victory, hull number 821, VC2-S-AP2/WSAT, renamed USAT Pvt. Frederick C. Murphy, was an American Army troop transport which saw duty just after World War II.

The Maritime Victory was unusual in that as an AP2 vessel, the cargo holds were converted for troop berthing (though with reduced cargo-carrying ability) and topside cargo handling gear was retained. A total of 97 such VC2-S-AP2 conversions were planned, 84 completed.

On 5 July 1946 the ship was returned to the U.S. Army. On 30 August 1946 it was put into the reserve fleet and renamed USAT Pvt. Frederick C. Murphy on 10 February 1950 in honor of World War II Medal of Honor recipient Frederick C. Murphy.

As one of the last surviving ships of her kind she received extensive documentation by the National Park Service in 2006, which produced the archival record Private Frederick C. Murphy HAER Report.

== History ==
=== Construction and operation ===
She was launched at the Bethlehem-Fairfield Shipyards on Tuesday, 22 May 1945, sponsored by J. Buell Snyder, wife of Congressman Snyder. Delivered on 18 June 1945, she was transferred to the Army War Department as an Army Transport. She was operated under contract by the American South African Line.

=== In Army service ===
The Maritime Victory was delivered to the USAT as a transport in June 1945. The ship made several crossings carrying troops from the European Theater of Operations, especially between Le Havre and New York. From Le Havre she often left from the area known as the Cigarette Camps as part of Operation Magic Carpet to take US troops home.

The ship, having been launched only days after V-E Day was primarily designed to transport troops both to and from Europe. While the main use of the ship was to transport troops, the ship was also used for humanitarian efforts in the immediate post-war time period. The ship made several crossings of the Atlantic. Many of the ships used to transport troops to Europe in the early days of the war were lost or functionally worn out. The Victory ship was newer and faster than the Liberty ships. When it was time to bring troops home the net transfer was mostly in moving troops from Europe to America instead of the other way around.

Some transportation of food and supplies were made in a role as a cargo ship to provide relief to the war torn countries of Europe, especially Germany.

=== Ready Reserve Fleet and scrapping ===
The ship was preserved in mothball status at the Beaumont Reserve Fleet in Beaumont, Texas. It was laid up in 1950. From 1983 to about 1990 the Fredrick C. Murphy was used as the fleet utility ship at Beaumont Reserve. In this role some offices were maintained aboard the ship.

The National Park Service's Historic American Engineering Record (HAER) visited the Private Frederick C. Murphy in 2006 to document the ship.

As of 2006, the ship has been removed from inventory of Beaumont Reserve. It is now located at Esco in Brownsville, Texas and awaits scrapping. Scrapping may be complete as soon as September 2006.

=== Known sailings ===
Date	From - To	Purpose
? October 1945 – 26 October 1945	Marseille, France–New York City	Transport 1,969 troops.
? November 1945 – 24 November 1945	Marseille–New York	Transport 1,648 troops
3 December 1945 – 18 December 1945	Le Havre–Newport News, Virginia	Transport 1,436 troops, including 2877th Military Police Battalion.
? ? 1946 – 7 January 1946	New York–Le Havre, France	Arrived to pick up troops.
7–19 January 1946	Le Havre–New York	Transport approximately 1,500 members of the 84th Infantry Division (some elements).
? ? 1946 – 15 February 1946	Le Havre–New York	Transport 1,014 troops, including 23rd Base Post Office, 45th Field Hospital, three nurses and five civilians.
? ? 1946 – 22 March 1946	Southampton, England–New York	Transport 989 troops, including 1196th Engineer Base Depot, 3231st Quartermaster Service Co., 813th Ordnance Base Depot Co., 713th Engineer Depot Co.
? ? 1946 – 18 April 1946	Le Havre–New York	Transport 879 troops, including 123rd Armored Ordnance Maintenance Battalion, 345th Quartermaster Co.
17–26 May 1946	Bremerhaven, Germany–New York	Transport 102nd Infantry Division (Ozarks), 405th Infantry Regiment.
17 June 1946 – 25 June 1946	Le Havre–New York	Transport 1,363 troops.
26 July 1946 – 4 August 1946	Bremerhaven–New York	Transport of 1,317 troops.
15 August 1946 – ? ? 1946	New York–?, ?	German war prisoners.
? September 1946 – 10 September 1946	Bremerhaven–New York	Transport 1,237 US soldiers back to United States.
? October 1946 – 14 October 1946	Bremerhaven–New York	Transport 1,388 US soldiers back to United States.
22 October 1946 – ? October/November 1946	New York–Livorno, Italy	Transport US Occupation troops to Europe.
? November 1946 – 18 November 1946	Livorno–New York	Transport 1,244 troops.
5 December 1946 – ? December 1946	New York–Bremerhaven	Transport troops.
23 December 1946 – 2 January 1947	Bremerhaven–New York	Transport US soldiers back to United States (some US Army Occupation troops).
20 January 1947 – ? January/February 1947	New York–Bremerhaven	Sailing to Europe.
? ? 1947 – 21 February 1947	Bremerhaven–New York	Transport 832 troops.
10–12 March 1947	New York–Portland, Maine	To arrive at Portland for loading Maine seed potatoes for shipment to Germany for planting in the American and British Occupied Zones. Sailing was to take place a few days later.
27 March 1947 – ? March 1947	Portland–Germany	Transport of 4,000 tons of Maine seed potatoes.

== See also ==
- SS American Victory, a similar VC2-S-AP2 vessel preserved as a museum ship
- List of Victory ships
- Liberty ship
- Type C1 ship
- Type C2 ship
- Type C3 ship
