= Charley Havlat =

United States Army soldier

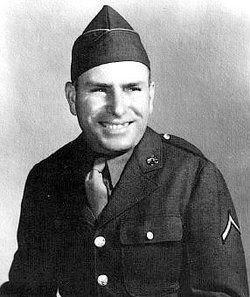
- Born: Charles Havlat; November 4, 1910; Saline County, Nebraska, US
- Died: May 7, 1945 (aged 34) near Volary, Czechoslovakia (now Czech Republic)
- Burial place: Plot C, Row 5, Grave 75; Lorraine American Cemetery and Memorial, Saint-Avold, France
- Military career
- Allegiance: United States
- Branch: United States Army
- Service years: 1942–1945
- Rank: Private first class
- Nickname: Charley
- Service number: 37153423
- Unit: 803rd Tank Destroyer Battalion
- Conflicts: World War II †; Normandy; Northern France; Rhineland; Ardennes-Alsace; Central Europe
- Awards: Purple Heart; Army Good Conduct Medal; American Campaign Medal; European-African-Middle Eastern Campaign Medal; World War II Victory Medal

Private First Class Charles Havlat (November 4, 1910 – May 7, 1945) is recognized as being the last United States Army soldier to be killed in combat in the European Theater of Operations during World War II. On May 7, 1945, he was a member of a reconnaissance patrol of the 803rd Tank Destroyer Battalion operating near present day Volary, Czech Republic. The patrol was ambushed by German soldiers, and Havlat was struck and killed by small arms fire about ten minutes before the news that all German troops in Europe were to obey a ceasefire order reached his unit, and only about six hours before the unconditional surrender of Germany.

== Early life ==
Charley Havlat was born on November 4, 1910, in rural Saline County, Nebraska, to Anton M. and Antonia (née Nemec) Havlat. Charley's parents immigrated separately from the present day Czech Republic. His father Anton, from present day Ronov, which is a part of the municipality of Ořechov (Žďár nad Sázavou District), arrived in the United States on November 12, 1903, and first came to Omaha, Nebraska. His mother Antonia was from present day Ondrušky, Czechia. Anton and Antonia were married in March 1909, and later moved to a farm in Saline County. Charley was the oldest of six children. Charley worked as a farm hand and started a trucking company with his brother Lumir, hauling grain, rocks, and salt between Dorchester and Crete and in eastern Nebraska. He never married.

== Military service and death ==
By 1940, Havlat was living in Dorchester, Nebraska. In February 1942, Havlat was drafted into the United States Army. His brothers Adolph, Lumir, and Rudolf also eventually served in the Army during World War II. Havlat was assigned to the Reconnaissance Company of the 803rd Tank Destroyer Battalion at Fort Lewis, Washington; his brother Rudolf also coincidentally served in the 803rd. The battalion trained in Washington and Oregon before receiving its full complement of enlisted men and moving to Camp Hood, Texas in August 1942. In December 1942, the 803rd moved to Fort Dix, New Jersey, and then Pine Camp, New York, in March 1943. In June 1943, the 803rd was alerted for overseas movement and staged at Camp Kilmer, New Jersey until June 22, 1943, when it departed for Greenock. Scotland, arriving on June 29, 1943.

On June 13, 1944, the 803rd Tank Destroyer Battalion arrived in France via Omaha Beach and entered combat in the hedgerows of Normandy equipped with M10 tank destroyers. In August 1944, after the Normandy breakout, the battalion raced across France to Belgium and the Netherlands. In October and November 1944, the 803rd fought in the Battle of Aachen and the Battle of Hürtgen Forest. In December 1944, the battalion participated in the Battle of the Bulge. Company C earned a Distinguished Unit Citation for actions in combat from November 16 to December 4, 1944. In February 1945, the 803rd converted from the M10 to the M36 tank destroyer. Crossing the Rhine River on March 23, 1945, the battalion participated in the elimination of the Ruhr Pocket and then moved southeast towards Austria and Czechoslovakia.

On the morning of May 7, 1945, Havlat was a member of a Reconnaissance Company patrol seeking the location of German forces near the town of Volary, Czechoslovakia, in support of an attack by the 2nd Infantry Regiment, 5th Infantry Division. On that day, it had been ordered by Wilhelm Keitel and Alfred Jodl that all German armed forces were to obey a ceasefire declaration before the unconditional surrender was signed, but the announcement took some time to make its way to all units. At about 8:20 AM, the American patrol encountered German troops of the 11th Panzer Division along a road and received a burst of small arms and Panzerfaust fire from a patch of woods. Several American soldiers were wounded, and Private First Class Havlat, taking cover behind a jeep, raised his head and was hit by a bullet. He was killed instantly. The announcement that German forces had agreed to a ceasefire reached Havlat's patrol only ten minutes later. The German officer who led the troops that had fired upon Havlat's patrol, not knowing about the ceasefire, later apologized for his actions. Charley Havlat is interred at the Lorraine American Cemetery and Memorial, near Saint-Avold, France, in Plot C, Row 5, Grave 75. The Havlat family was not informed of the fact that Charley was the last American soldier to die in Europe during the Second World War.

== Honors and awards ==
Private First Class Havlat was entitled to the following United States military awards for his service:

Purple Heart		Army Good Conduct Medal
American Campaign Medal	European-African-Middle Eastern Campaign Medal with one silver campaign star	World War II Victory Medal

On May 4, 2002, a small plaque and sign were dedicated to Charley Havlat at a memorial located along First-class Road 39 between the towns of Lenora and Volary.

An effort is ongoing to rename the eight-mile stretch of Nebraska Highway 33 that runs from Dorchester to Crete the "Charles Havlat Memorial Highway." An initial request filed with the state of Nebraska in 2006 was rejected, and a second request is currently being considered as of 2015.

Beginning in 2007, the Dorchester American Legion post and the Dorchester Area Community Foundation successfully raised $5,000 for a Nebraska state historical marker honoring Havlat to be placed at the Saline County Museum. The monument was dedicated on Sunday, May 30, 2010.

On May 7, 2015, seventy years after the end of World War II in Europe, Nebraska governor Pete Ricketts visited Charley Havlat's historical marker at the Saline County Museum and proclaimed "Charley Havlat Day."
