= Stanley Eric Reinhart =

United States Army general

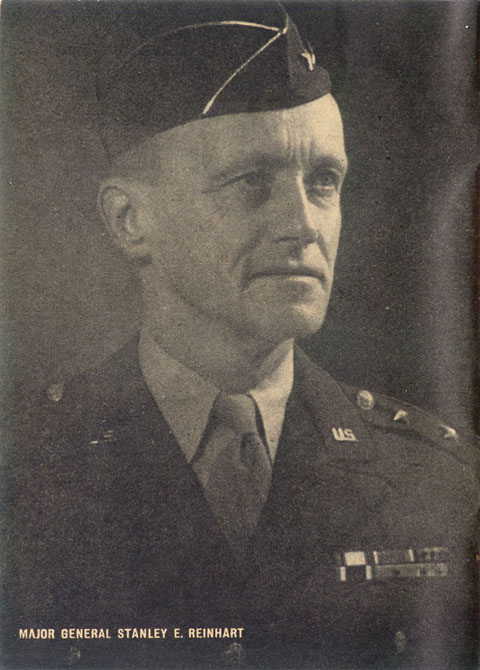
- Born: September 15, 1893; Polk, Ohio, United States
- Died: June 4, 1975 (aged 81); Hendersonville, North Carolina, United States
- Burial place: West Point Cemetery
- Military career
- Allegiance: United States
- Branch: United States Army
- Service years: 1916–1946
- Rank: Major General
- Service number: 0-4421
- Unit: Field Artillery Branch
- Commands: 1st Battalion, 17th Field Artillery Regiment; 13th Field Artillery Regiment; 65th Infantry Division; 26th Infantry Division
- Conflicts: World War I World War II
- Awards: Army Distinguished Service Medal (2); Silver Star; Legion of Merit; Bronze Star (2)

Major General Stanley Eric Reinhart (September 15, 1893 – June 4, 1975) was a senior United States Army officer of the United States Army. He figured prominently in World War II as commander of the 65th Infantry Division.

== Early life and military career ==
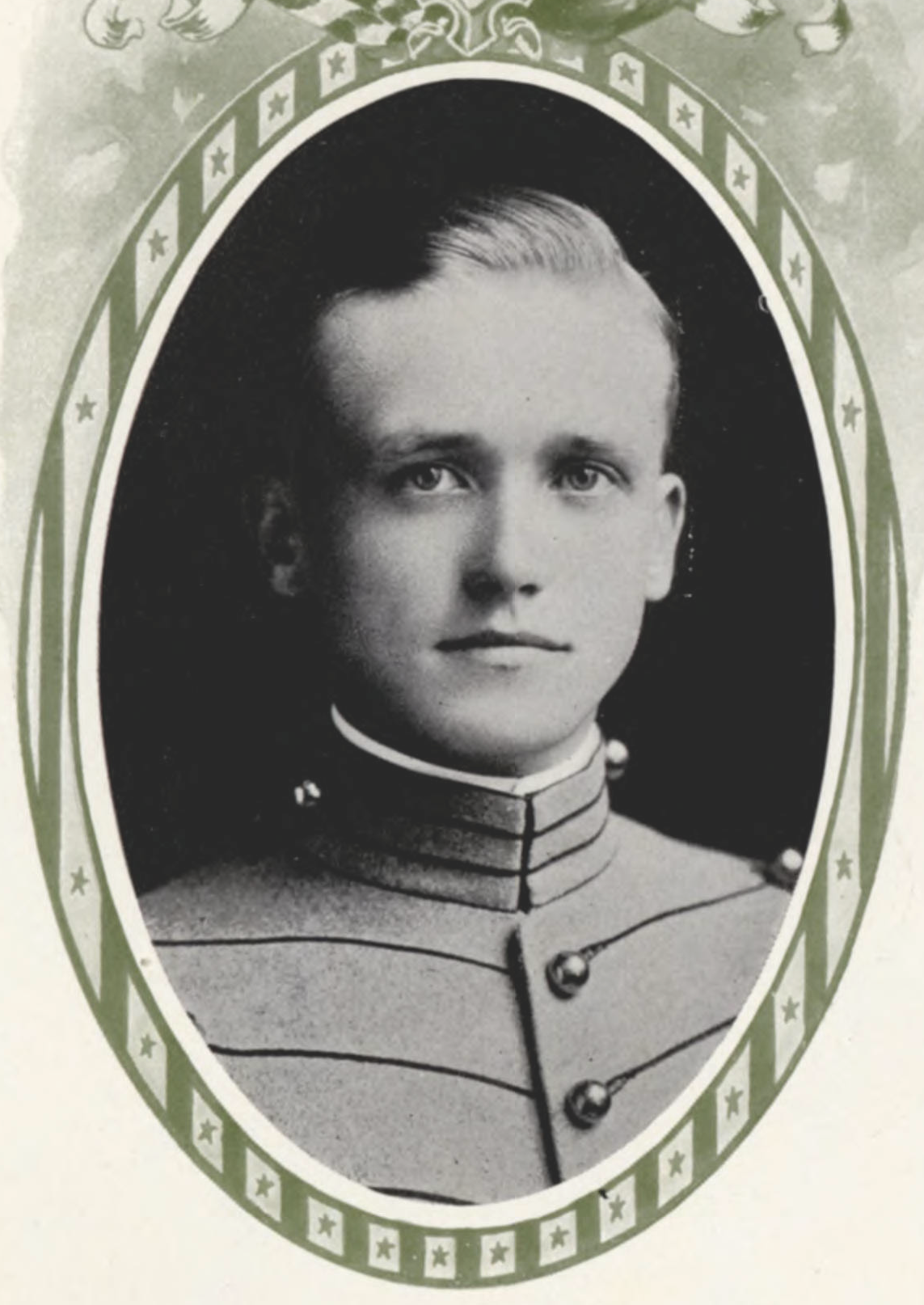
Reinhart at West Point in 1916.

Stanley Eric Reinhart was born on September 15, 1893, in Polk, Ohio (pop. 250). He worked briefly as a rural school teacher, in North Red Haw, Ohio, until 1911.

He entered the United States Military Academy (USMA) at West Point, New York, in June 1912, graduating from there 11th in a class of 125 cadets in June 1916, and was commissioned as a second lieutenant into the Field Artillery Branch of the United States Army. Among his classmates were Wilhelm D. Styer, Dwight Johns, Thomas D. Finley, Louis E. Hibbs, Ludson D. Worsham, Horace L. McBride, Robert Neyland, William M. Hoge, William R. Woodward, James A. Pickering, William Spence, Robert B. McBride Jr., Paul Vincent Kane, Fay B. Prickett, Calvin DeWitt Jr., Joseph M. Tully, Thomas L. Martin, Roland P. Shugg, James J. O'Hare and Otto F. Lange. All of these men would later rise to the rank of brigadier general or higher later in their military careers.

He received quick promotion to first Lieutenant on July 1. His first assignment after graduation was with the 5th Field Artillery Regiment, then stationed at Camp Bliss, Texas, where he served from September 1916 until June 1917, a few weeks after the American entry into World War I. Due to the army's expansion Reinhart was promoted again, to the rank of captain, on May 15.

The following month he became aide-de-camp to Colonel Peyton C. March (who became Army Chief of Staff the next year) and, with March, sailed for the Western Front in July.

Reinhart remained as March's aide until February 1918 when he assumed command of Battery 'A' of the 17th Field Artillery Regiment, part of the 2nd Division of the American Expeditionary Forces (AEF), from February to July 1918 (in action during the defense of sector from March 21 to May 12, Battle of Bois de Belleau). Following this, Reinhart, promoted to the temporary rank of major in July, commanded the 1st Battalion, 17th Field Artillery Regiment (Battle of Soissons, Ypres-Lys, and Meuse-Argonne). After this, in late August, he was assigned as chief of staff to the chief of artillery of the newly formed VI Corps, remaining in this position until late February 1919, which also included a brief stint serving with the British I Corps of the British Expeditionary Force (BEF).

Reinhart was awarded the Army Distinguished Service Medal for his actions during the war. The citation for his Army DSM reads:

The President of the United States of America, authorized by Act of Congress, July 9, 1918, takes pleasure in presenting the Army Distinguished Service Medal to Major (Field Artillery) Stanley Eric Reinhart, United States Army, for exceptionally meritorious and distinguished services to the Government of the United States, in a duty of great responsibility during World War I. In Command of a battery and subsequently a battalion of the 17th Field Artillery, 2d Division, Major Reinhart gave proof of high qualities of leadership and military attainments, notably during the operations near Soissons in July 1918, when he skillfully maneuvered his battalion in front of the infantry under machine-gun fire from the enemy with but few casualties to his command. Later he rendered valuable and loyal service as Chief of Staff of Artillery, 6th Army Corps.

== Between the wars ==
The war came to an end in November due to the Armistice with Germany. After giving up his previous assignment with VI Corps, he served at Chaumont as a member of the historical section of the AEF's general staff. This lasted until May when he rejoined the 17th Field Artillery, now serving in Germany as part of the Allied occupation of the Rhineland, and again assumed command of the regiment's 1st Battalion, a position he held until September, by which time he, with his battalion, had returned to the United States. He then reverted to his permanent grade of captain and was sent to the USMA as an instructor in field artillery tactics in the Department of Tactics.

On August 4 Reinhart married Jeannette Crane of Toledo, Ohio, on May 5, 1920, at West Point, New York. They had a son and daughter.

Between the wars he served three years as an instructor of field artillery tactics at the USMA; four years in the U.S. Army Command and General Staff School and the U.S. Army War College; two years as instructor at the U.S. Army Field Artillery School; three years General Staff with troops in Hawaii; and four years as Treasurer at West Point, New York. On July 1, 1937, he was promoted to lieutenant colonel, and again, almost four years later, to the temporary rank of full colonel on June 26, 1941. By this time he was serving in Hawaii as executive officer (XO) of the 8th Field Artillery Regiment, having been in this post since September 1940. Soon afterwards Reinhart was made commanding officer (CO) of the 13th Field Artillery Regiment, then also serving in Hawaii.

== World War II ==
As a temporary brigadier general from March 11, 1942, three months after the American entry into World War II, he commanded the artillery of the 25th Infantry Division, defending the shores of Oahu in the Pacific War. On December 6, 1942, Reinhart sailed for Guadalcanal to participate in operations that helped terminate hostilities there. Ordered home to the United States by the War Department on April 22, 1943, he landed at San Francisco, California on April 26.

From July 1, 1943, until December 18, 1944, Reinhart, who received a temporary promotion to the rank of major general on September 17, 1943 (and promoted to the permanent rank of colonel on August 1, 1944), organized and trained the 65th Infantry Division at Camp Shelby, Mississippi. He was aided by his Assistant Division Commander (ADC), Brigadier General Henry A. Barber until November when Brigadier John E. Copeland replaced him.

On January 10, 1945, as the Commanding General (CG) of the 65th, he, with his division, sailed to the European Theater of Operations (ETO). He joined Lieutenant General George Patton's U.S. Third Army at the Sarre River, and fought with it on the Western Front across Germany and Austria.

Under his leadership, the 65th Division managed forced crossings of the Fulda, Werra, Danube, Inn, Traun, and Enns Rivers. His soldiers took the German cities of Saarlautern, Neunkirchen, Oberursel, Friedberg, Hattenback, Bebra, Rottenburg (Bavaria), Treffurt, Langensalza, Neumarkt, Regensburg, and Passau—as well as Schärding, Eferding, Linz, and Enns in Austria. His men captured the German Danube Flotilla and the Hungarian Navy, consisting of 25 armed ships and over 400 other craft.

At the end of combat, Reinhart and the 65th Infantry Division were over 100 miles (160 kilometers) east of a north and south line through Berlin, Germany. Fighting in Europe was to end at midnight on May 8, 1945. By now a major general, Reinhart arrived in Erlauf, a hamlet in Austria, where he met the Soviets and shook hands with his counterpart. In addition to commanding his own troops, Reinhart was soon appointed as military governor of Upper Austria.

Reinhart continued to reside in Linz, where the 65th Infantry Division, and subsequently the 26th Infantry Division, had its headquarters.

== Later years ==
Hospitalized on October 15, 1945, Reinhart returned to the United States as a patient on November 15, 1945. On September 30, 1946, he retired from the army after 30 years due to physical disability, with the rank of major general. He died in Hendersonville, North Carolina, on June 4, 1975, at the age of 81, and was buried at West Point Cemetery.

== Awards and honors ==
Stanley Reinhart received many military decorations during his career. He also became an honorary member of the Russian Guards.

Major General Reinhart's ribbon bar:

1st Row	Army Distinguished Service Medal with Oak Leaf Cluster		Silver Star	Legion of Merit
2nd Row	Bronze Star Medal with Oak Leaf Cluster	World War I Victory Medal with four Battle Clasps	Army of Occupation of Germany Medal	American Defense Service Medal
3rd Row	American Campaign Medal	Asiatic-Pacific Campaign Medal with two service stars	European-African-Middle Eastern Campaign Medal with two service stars	World War II Victory Medal
4th Row	Army of Occupation Medal	Officer of the Legion of Honor (France)	French Croix de guerre 1939–1945 with Palm	Order of the Patriotic War First Class (Union of Soviet Socialist Republics)

Military offices
Preceded by Newly activated organization	Commanding General 65th Infantry Division; 1943–1945	Succeeded by John E. Copeland
Preceded by Harlan N. Hartnass	Commanding General 26th Infantry Division; July–November 1945	Succeeded by Robert W. Grow
