= 65th Infantry Division (United States) =

- 65th Infantry Division shoulder sleeve insignia
- Active: 12 March 1943–31 August 1945
- Country: United States
- Branch: United States Army
- Type: Infantry
- Size: Division
- Nickname: "Battle-Axe"
- Engagements: World War II; Rhineland; Central Europe

Insignia
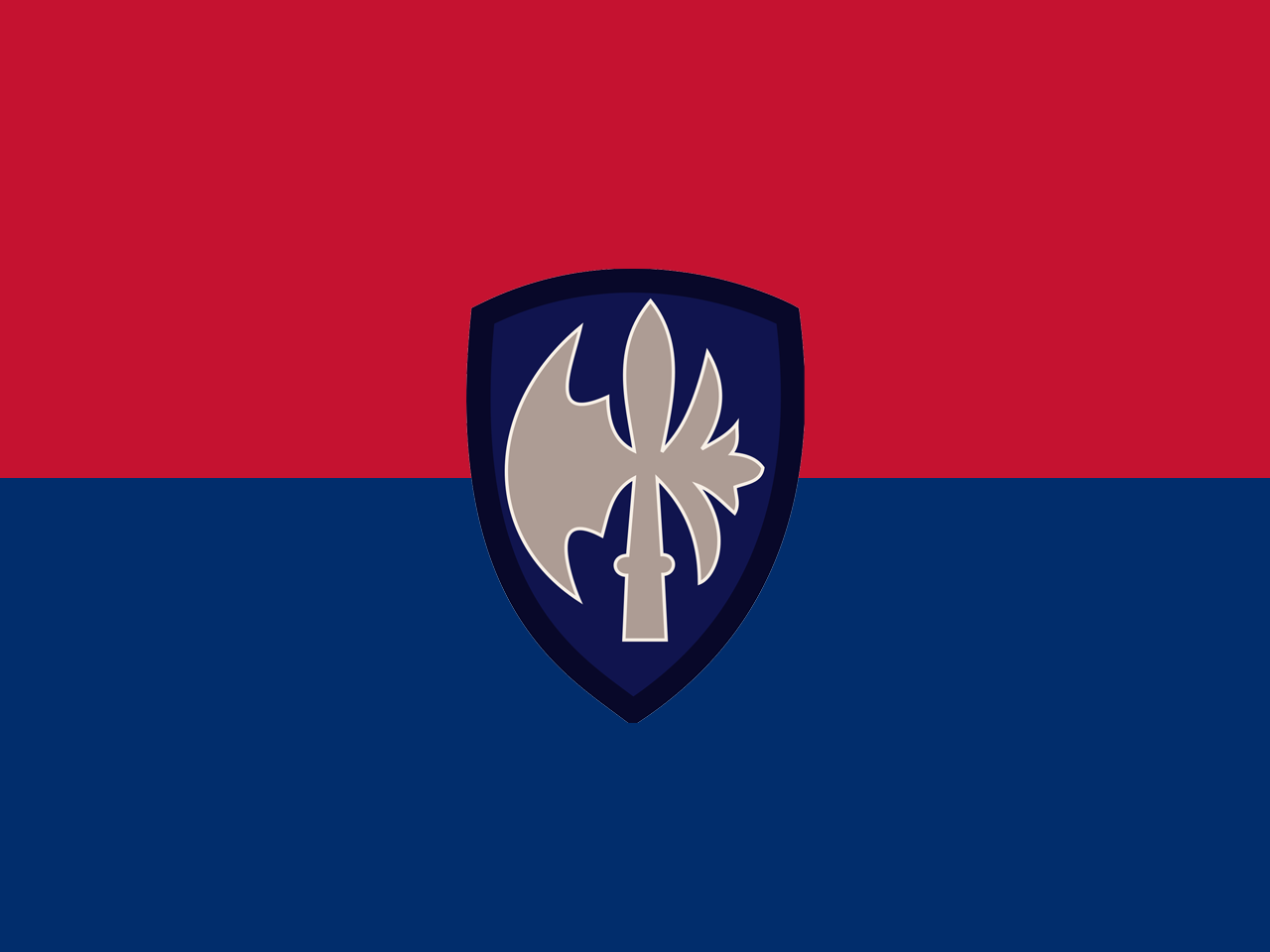
- Flag of the United States Army 65th Infantry Division

The 65th Infantry Division—nicknamed the "Battle-Axe Division"—was an infantry division of the United States Army that served in World War II. Its shoulder patch is a white halberd on a blue shield.

The entire length of Pennsylvania Route 65 is named the 65th Infantry Division Memorial Highway in its honor.

The home arena for the United States Military Academy at West Point's men's and women's basketball teams is named Christl Arena in honor of First Lieutenant Edward C. Christl, who served with the division during World War II and was killed in action in Austria on May 4, 1945.

== History ==
=== World War II ===
- Activated: 16 August 1943 at Camp Shelby, Mississippi
- Overseas: 10 January 1945.
- Campaigns: Rhineland, Central Europe.
- Days of combat: 55.
- Awards:
  - Medal of Honor - 1 Private First Class (Frederick C. Murphy), Medical Detachment, 259th Infantry, Siegfried Line at Saarlautern, Germany, 18 March 1945.
  - Distinguished Service Cross - 6
  - Distinguished Service Medal - 1
  - Silver Star Medal - 77
  - Legion of Merit - 14
  - Soldier's Medal - 4
  - Bronze Star Medal - 686
  - Air Medal - 19
- Commanders: Major General Stanley Eric Reinhart (August 1943 – 1 August 1945) and Brig. Gen. John E. Copeland (1 August 1945 to disbandment).
- Disbanded: 31 August 1945 in Germany.

==== Formation and training ====
The 65th Infantry Division was activated in the Army of the United States on 16 August 1943 at Camp Shelby, Mississippi, under the command of Major General Stanley E. Reinhart. As mobilization requirements were outpacing the induction rate, the complete quota of enlisted fillers for the division was not received until the end of the year, delaying the start of basic training until early January 1944. Unit training began on schedule in the spring, but in late May, the division received orders to begin processing infantry privates for shipment as overseas replacements. By July, the 65th Infantry Division had lost about 7,000 men, with officer losses from April to July exceeding one-third, or about 250, particularly lieutenants and captains. When the Army Specialized Training Program was heavily reduced in March 1944, the division was overstrength, so it did not receive any of these high-quality personnel. Replacements for outgoing enlisted men first arrived in May, in the form of 1,100 reassigned Air Corps cadets. In June and July, this was followed by a steady trickle of about 3,000 men from miscellaneous sources such as men returned from overseas (about 700), reassigned from disbanded antiaircraft and tank destroyer units, or men who volunteered for the infantry from other branches of the Army. In July, the division sent about 1,000 men aged nineteen or over to overseas replacement depots, from which it received a roughly equal number of eighteen year old graduates of replacement training centers.

In late July. major withdrawals ended and a program of modified unit retraining was begun, but a steady trickle of men continued to leave; losses in August aggregated 1,173. In late September, the division was alerted for overseas movement to occur in mid-January 1945, a "bombshell," as training had been predicated on the fact that movement was not to be expected before mid-1945. Roughly 1,000 men unqualified for overseas service were dropped, and the division received 2,000 new men in the three months subsequent to being alerted. In mid-October, another startling communication was received, as the movement date for the infantry regiments had been pushed up to 13 November with their equipment to be packed by 28 October. This disrupted the beginning of a program of modified combined training, but the personnel readiness date was shortly pushed back to 24 December and the equipment date to 10 December. After an abbreviated program of combined training using a large amount of equipment borrowed from other units, the last elements of the division departed Camp Shelby on New Year's Eve 1944.

==== Division organization ====
The 65th Infantry Division consisted of the following units.

65th Infantry Division organization (click to enlarge)

- 65th Infantry Division
  - 65th Infantry Division Headquarters
  - 65th Cavalry Reconnaissance Troop (Mechanized) (M3 scout cars and then M8 Greyhound armored cars)
  - 259th Infantry Regiment
    - Headquarters and Headquarters Company
    - 3× Infantry battalions
      - each battalion consists of: 1× Headquarters and Headquarters Company, 3× Rifle companies, 1× Heavy Weapons Company
    - Cannon Company (T12 Gun Motor Carriages and T19 Howitzer Motor Carriages, later replaced by either M3 105mm towed howitzers or M7 Priest self propelled howitzers)
    - Anti-Tank Company (M3 37mm anti-tank guns, which were replaced by 1944 with M1 57mm anti-tank guns)
    - Service Company
  - 260th Infantry Regiment
    - same organization as 259th Infantry Regiment
  - 261st Infantry Regiment
    - same organization as 259th Infantry Regiment
  - 65th Infantry Division Artillery
    - Headquarters and Headquarters Battery
    - 720th Field Artillery Battalion
      - Headquarters and Headquarters Battery
      - 3× Batteries (M1 155mm towed howitzers)
      - Service Battery
    - 867th Field Artillery Battalion
      - Headquarters and Headquarters Battery
      - 3× Batteries (M2 105mm towed howitzers)
      - Service Battery
    - 868th Field Artillery Battalion
      - same organization as 867th Field Artillery Battalion
    - 869th Field Artillery Battalion
      - same organization as 867th Field Artillery Battalion
  - Headquarters Special Troops
    - Headquarters Company, 65th Infantry Division
    - 565th Signal Company
    - 65th Quartermaster Company
    - 765th Ordnance Light Maintenance Company
    - Military Police Platoon
    - 65th Infantry Division Band (attached)
  - 265th Engineer Combat Battalion
    - Headquarters and Headquarters and Service Company
    - 3× Engineer combat companies
  - 365th Medical Battalion
    - Headquarters and Headquarters Detachment
    - 3× Collecting companies
    - Clearing Company

Attached units:

- 707th Tank Battalion (attached 6 Apr 45 only)
- 748th Tank Battalion (attached 7 Apr 45-past 9 May 45)
- 749th Tank Battalion (attached 29 Mar 45-6 Apr 45)
- 691st Tank Destroyer Battalion (attached 4 Mar 45-6 Apr 45)
- 808th Tank Destroyer Battalion (attached 5 Apr 45-past 9 May 45)
- 546th AAA Automatic Weapons Battalion (attached 4 Mar 45-past 9 May 45)

Source: Order of Battle: U.S. Army World War II by Shelby Stanton.

==== Combat chronicle ====
The 65th Infantry Division landed at Le Havre, France, 21 January 1945, and proceeded to Camp Lucky Strike, where training continued until 1 March, when the division moved forward to relieve the 26th Infantry Division. First elements entered the line, 5 March 1945, and the division as a whole took over aggressive defense of the sector along the Saar, from Orscholz to Wadgassen, on 8 March 1945. On 17 March, the division attacked across the Saar, crossing the river at Dillingen and captured Saarlautern, 19 March, as Siegfried Line defenses cracked. Capturing Neunkirchen, 21 March 1945, the division raced to the Rhine, crossed the river at Oppenheim, 30 March, and ran into heavy German resistance and counterattacks. Langensalza fell on 5 April, Struth on the 7th, and Neumarkt on the 22nd.

Continuing its advance against crumbling German opposition, the division crossed the Danube 4 miles below Regensburg, 26 April, took the city, 27 April, seized Passau, cross the Inn River, 4 May, and occupied Linz, Austria, on the 5th. Germans surrendered en masse. On 9 May, as hostilities officially ended in Europe, the troops of the 65th made contact with the Russians at Erlauf.

==== Casualties ====
- Total battle casualties: 1,230
- Killed in action: 233
- Wounded in action: 927
- Missing in action: 3
- Prisoner of war: 67

==== Assignments in ETO ====
- 25 January 1945: Fifteenth Army, 12th Army Group.
- 1 March 1945: XX Corps, Third Army, 12th Army Group.
- 4 April 1945: VIII Corps.
- 17 April 1945: XX Corps.

== Notable members ==
- Ronald C. Brock commanded the 65th Infantry Division Artillery. He later served as Adjutant General of New York.
