= Andrew Miller (Medal of Honor, 1944) =

United States Army soldier

- Born: August 11, 1916; Manitowoc, Wisconsin, United States
- Died: November 29, 1944 (aged 28) near Hemmersdorf, Germany
- Burial place: Lorraine American Cemetery and Memorial in Saint-Avold, Moselle, France
- Military career
- Allegiance: United States
- Branch: United States Army
- Service years: 1942–1944
- Rank: Staff Sergeant
- Units: 377th Infantry Regiment, 95th Infantry Division
- Conflicts: World War II
- Awards: Medal of Honor; Purple Heart

Andrew Miller (August 11, 1916 – November 29, 1944) was a United States Army soldier and a recipient of the United States military's highest decoration, the Medal of Honor, for his actions in World War II.

== Biography ==
Miller was inducted into the army in June 1942 in Two Rivers, Wisconsin, and by November 16, 1944, he was serving as a staff sergeant in Company G, 377th Infantry Regiment, 95th Infantry Division. On that day, at Woippy, France, he singlehandedly captured two German machine-gun positions. The next day, outside of Metz, he stayed behind while his platoon withdrew and then destroyed another enemy machine-gun nest. He again distinguished himself in Metz from November 19 to November 21, when he led his men in the capture of dozens of Germans and disabled two more enemy machine guns. He was killed eight days later on November 29 while leading his squad in a fight with German forces outside of Hemmersdorf, Germany. For this series of actions, he was posthumously awarded the Medal of Honor on September 1, 1945.

Miller was buried at the Lorraine American Cemetery and Memorial in Saint-Avold, France.

== Medal of Honor citation ==
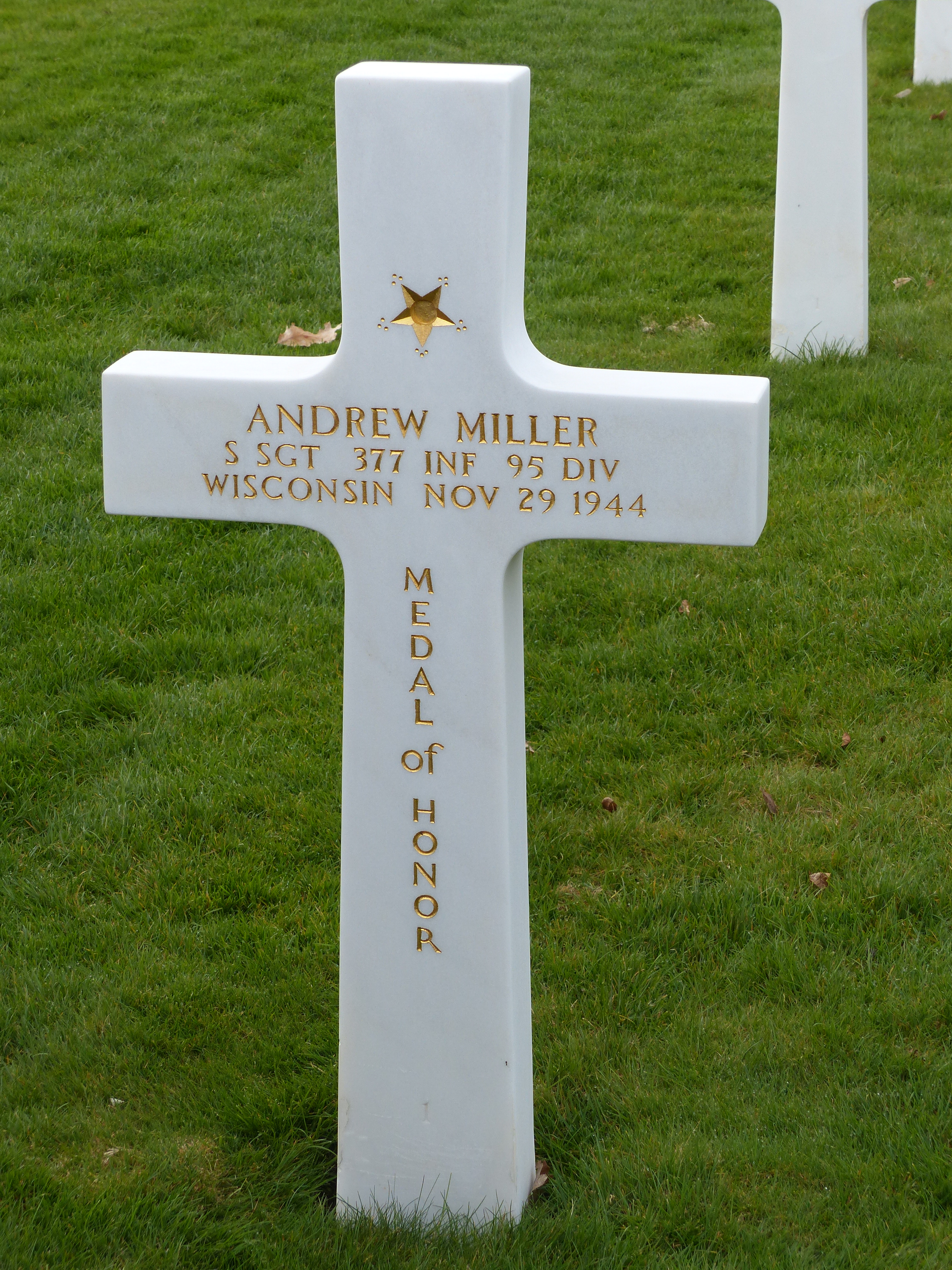
Gravestone of Andrew Miller

Staff Sergeant Miller's official Medal of Honor citation reads:

For performing a series of heroic deeds from 16 to 29 November 1944, during his company's relentless drive from Woippy, France, through Metz to Kerprich Hemmersdorf, Germany. As he led a rifle squad on 16 November at Woippy, a crossfire from enemy machineguns pinned down his unit. Ordering his men to remain under cover, he went forward alone, entered a building housing 1 of the guns and forced 5 Germans to surrender at bayonet point. He then took the second gun single-handedly by hurling grenades into the enemy position, killing 2, wounding 3 more, and taking 2 additional prisoners. At the outskirts of Metz the next day, when his platoon, confused by heavy explosions and the withdrawal of friendly tanks, retired, he fearlessly remained behind armed with an automatic rifle and exchanged bursts with a German machinegun until he silenced the enemy weapon. His quick action in covering his comrades gave the platoon time to regroup and carry on the fight. On 19 November S/Sgt. Miller led an attack on large enemy barracks. Covered by his squad, he crawled to a barracks window, climbed in and captured 6 riflemen occupying the room. His men, and then the entire company, followed through the window, scoured the building, and took 75 prisoners. S/Sgt. Miller volunteered, with 3 comrades, to capture Gestapo officers who were preventing the surrender of German troops in another building. He ran a gauntlet of machinegun fire and was lifted through a window. Inside, he found himself covered by a machine pistol, but he persuaded the 4 Gestapo agents confronting him to surrender. Early the next morning, when strong hostile forces punished his company with heavy fire, S/Sgt. Miller assumed the task of destroying a well-placed machinegun. He was knocked down by a rifle grenade as he climbed an open stairway in a house, but pressed on with a bazooka to find an advantageous spot from which to launch his rocket. He discovered that he could fire only from the roof, a position where he would draw tremendous enemy fire. Facing the risk, he moved into the open, coolly took aim and scored a direct hit on the hostile emplacement, wreaking such havoc that the enemy troops became completely demoralized and began surrendering by the score. The following day, in Metz, he captured 12 more prisoners and silenced an enemy machinegun after volunteering for a hazardous mission in advance of his company's position. On 29 November, as Company G climbed a hill overlooking Kerprich Hemmersdorf, enemy fire pinned the unit to the ground. S/Sgt. Miller, on his own initiative, pressed ahead with his squad past the company's leading element to meet the surprise resistance. His men stood up and advanced deliberately, firing as they went. Inspired by S/Sgt. Miller's leadership, the platoon followed, and then another platoon arose and grimly closed with the Germans. The enemy action was smothered, but at the cost of S/Sgt. Miller's life. His tenacious devotion to the attack, his gallant choice to expose himself to enemy action rather than endanger his men, his limitless bravery, assured the success of Company G.

== Other honors ==
The USAT Sgt. Andrew Miller, a United States Army cargo ship, was named in his honor on October 31, 1947. Miller Barracks, a U.S. military facility in Germany, was also named in his honor. In his home of Manitowoc County, Wisconsin, the Andrew Miller U.S. Army Reserve Center is named for him, and the local chapter of the Disabled American Veterans organization is named Andrew Miller Chapter 24. In 2003, the 95th Division formed the Sergeant Andrew Miller Club in memory of Miller's actions.

== See also ==
- List of Medal of Honor recipients for World War II
