= 27th Armored Division (United States) =

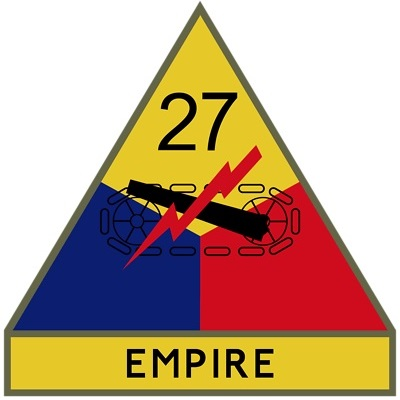
- Active: 1 February 1955–1 February 1968
- Country: United States
- Branch: United States Army
- Type: Armored
- Nickname: "Empire"

Commanders
- Notable commanders: Major General Ronald C. Brock (first commander)
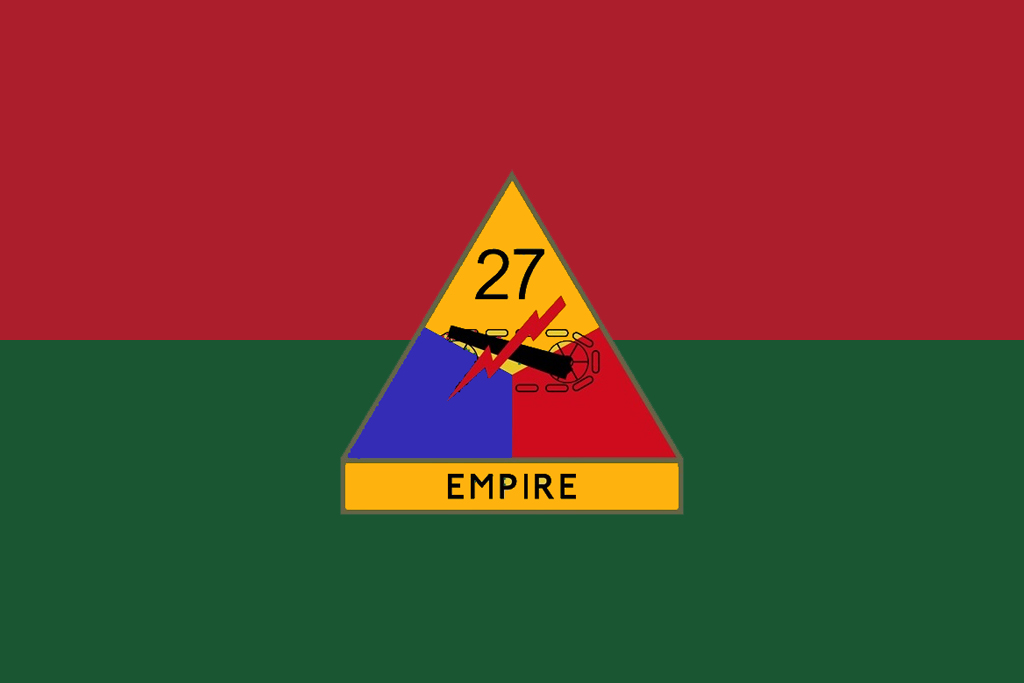
- Flag of the United States Army 27th Armored Division

The 27th Armored Division was a United States Army formation. It was part of the New York Army National Guard in the 1950s and 1960s.

== Activation ==
In February, 1955 a reorganization of the Army National Guard included reorganizing the 27th Infantry Division as the 27th Armored Division. This included exchanging the black and red "NYD" (New York Division) shoulder patch for the triangle-shaped patch of the Army's armor divisions. The 27th Armored Division was called the "Empire Division," after New York's nickname, the Empire State.

The division headquarters was originally in Buffalo, and was later moved to Syracuse.

== Composition, 1955 ==
In 1955, the composition of the 27th Armored Division was:

- Headquarters & Headquarters Company, 27th Armored Division
- Combat Commands A, B, and C

Infantry:

- 105th Armored Infantry Battalion
- 108th Armored Infantry Battalion
- 174th Armored Infantry Battalion
- 175th Armored Infantry Battalion

Armor:

- 127th Tank Battalion
- 205th Tank Battalion
- 208th Tank Battalion
- 274th Tank Battalion

Artillery:

- Headquarters, 27th Armored Division Artillery (DIVARTY)
- 106th Armored Field Artillery Battalion
- 186th Armored Field Artillery Battalion
- 249th Armored Field Artillery Battalion
- 270th Armored Field Artillery Battalion
- 210th Antiaircraft Artillery Battalion (from 127th AAA)

Separate Units:

- 27th Armored Reconnaissance Battalion
- 152nd Armored Engineer Battalion
- 27th Armored Signal Battalion

Trains:

- Headquarters and Headquarters Company, 27th Armored Division Trains
- 727th Armored Ordnance Battalion
- 134th Armored Medical Battalion
- 27th Armored Quartermaster Battalion
- 27th Military Police Company
- 27th Replacement Company

== Composition, 1960 ==
- Headquarters & Headquarters Company, 27th Armored Division
- Combat Commands A, B, and C

Infantry: armored rifle battalions

- 1st Battalion, 105th Infantry
- 1st Battalion, 108th Infantry
- 2nd Battalion, 108th Infantry
- 1st Battalion, 174th Infantry

Armor: medium tank battalions

- 1st Battalion, 127th Armor
- 1st Battalion, 174th Armor
- 1st Battalion, 205th Armor
- 1st Battalion, 108th Armor
- 1st Battalion, 210th Armor (from 210th Anti-aircraft Artillery)
- 1st Squadron, 121st Armor (from 27th Armored Reconnaissance Battalion)

Artillery:

- Headquarters, 27th Armored Division Artillery (DIVARTY)

Howitzer battalions:

- 1st Battalion, 104th Artillery
- 1st Battalion, 180th Artillery
- 1st Battalion, 270th Artillery
- 1st Battalion (Rocket), 106th Artillery

Separate units:

- 127th Aviation Company
- 152nd Engineer Battalion
- 227th Signal Battalion (from 27th Signal Battalion).

Trains:

- Headquarters and Headquarters Company, 27th Armored Division Trains
- 727th Armored Ordnance Battalion
- 134th Armored Medical Battalion
- 27th Armored Quartermaster Battalion
- 27th Military Police Company
- 227th Transportation Detachment (Aircraft Maintenance)
- 527th Administrative Company

== Composition, 1966 ==
- Headquarters & Headquarters Company, 27th Armored Division
- 1st Brigade:
  - 1st Battalion, 105th Infantry
  - 1st Battalion, 205th Armor
  - 1st Battalion, 210th Armor
- 2nd Brigade:
  - 1st Battalion, 108th Infantry
  - 2nd Battalion, 108th Infantry
  - 1st Battalion, 208th Armor
- 3rd Brigade:
  - 1st Battalion, 174th Infantry
  - 1st Battalion, 127th Armor
  - 2nd Battalion, 127th Armor
  - 1st Battalion, 174th Armor
  - 1st Squadron, 121st Cavalry
- Headquarters, 27th Armored Division Artillery (DIVARTY):
  - 1st Battalion, 104th Field Artillery
  - 1st Battalion, 106th Field Artillery
  - 1st Battalion, 156th Field Artillery
  - 2nd Battalion, 156th Field Artillery
  - 1st Battalion, 170th Field Artillery
- Separate commands:
  - 27th Armored Division Band
  - 27th Administrative Company
  - 27th Supply & Transportation Battalion
  - 134th Medical Battalion
  - 152nd Engineer Battalion
  - 727th Maintenance Battalion

== Commanders ==
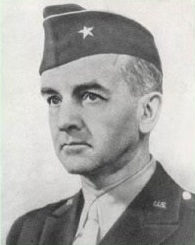
Ronald C. Brock, first commander of the 27th Armored Division.

Three individuals served as commander of the 27th Armored Division:

- Major General Ronald C. Brock (1955–1957). Brock had been commander of the 27th Infantry Division. He subsequently served as commander of the New York National Guard.
- MG Almerin C. O'Hara (1957–1959). O'Hara later served as commander of the New York National Guard, and state Commissioner of General Services. When Albany County shifted to a county executive/county legislature form of government in 1975, O'Hara was the unsuccessful Republican nominee for Albany County Executive.
- MG Collin P. Williams (1959–1968) Williams had served as commander of Combat Command B, 27th Armored Division and the division's Assistant Division Commander. He retired in 1968.

== Deactivation ==
The 27th Armored Division was inactivated in February, 1968 during another reorganization of the Army National Guard. During its existence the 27th Armored Division was not activated for federal service and saw no combat. It was activated for state service, including the response to the 1964 Rochester riot.

== Subsequent history ==
27th Infantry Division SSI.

The division was reorganized in 1968 as the 27th Armored Brigade, a unit of the 50th Armored Division.

The 27th Armored Brigade was reorganized as an Infantry brigade in 1975 and aligned with the 42nd Infantry Division.

In 1985 the 27th Infantry Brigade was activated as part of the New York Army National Guard, and assigned as the "roundout" brigade of the Army's 10th Mountain Division.

The 27th Brigade was later reorganized on 1 April 1986 as the 27th Infantry Brigade Combat Team, and reestablished use of the 27th Infantry Division's NYD shoulder sleeve insignia. The 27th Infantry Brigade carries on the lineage and history of the 27th Infantry Division.
