= Almerin C. O'Hara =

US Army major general

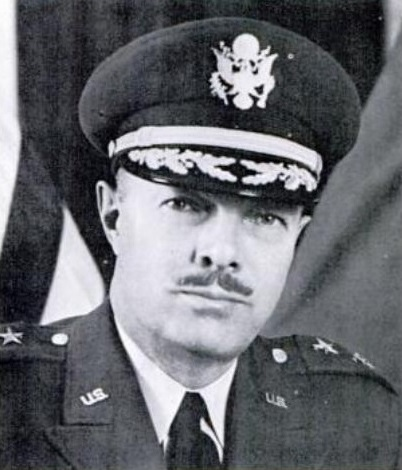
- From 1968's General Officers of the Army and Air National Guard
- Born: November 10, 1910; Hudson, New York, US
- Died: July 5, 1987 (aged 76); Norway, Maine, US
- Burial place: Cedar Park Cemetery, Hudson, New York, US
- Education: United States Army Command and General Staff College; United States Army War College
- Spouse: Marjorie Rushmore (m. 1935–1986)
- Children: 1 (Note: O'Hara was the father of a son, Almerin C. O'Hara Jr. He also had a stepson from his wife's previous marriage, Edmund R. Dawson.)
- Military career
- Service: New York Army National Guard (1934–1940, 1947–1971); United States Army (1940–1945); United States Army Reserve (1945–1947)
- Service years: 1934–1971
- Rank: Major General
- Nickname: Buzz
- Service number: 0328935
- Units: U.S. Army Infantry Branch; U.S. Army Armor Branch
- Commands: Adjutant General of New York; 27th Armored Division; 2nd Battalion, 106th Infantry Regiment; Headquarters and Headquarters Company, 106th Infantry Regiment
- Wars: World War II: Gilbert and Marshall Islands campaign; Occupation of Japan
- Awards: Army Distinguished Service Medal; Silver Star; Bronze Star Medal (2); Combat Infantryman Badge
- Other work: Executive, Universal Match Corporation; Commissioner, New York State Office of General Services; Director, New York State Emergency Fuel Office

Almerin C. O'Hara (November 10, 1910 – July 5, 1987) was a career officer in the United States Army. A longtime member of the New York Army National Guard, he attained the rank of major general and served as commander of the 27th Armored Division and as Adjutant General of New York. O'Hara was a veteran of World War II, and his military awards and decorations included the Army Distinguished Service Medal, Silver Star, Bronze Star Medal with oak leaf cluster, and Combat Infantryman Badge.

A native of Hudson, New York, O'Hara was raised and educated in Hudson and enlisted in the National Guard in 1934. He soon received his commission as a second lieutenant of Infantry, and served until 1940, when his unit was federalized for army service during World War II. O'Hara advanced through the ranks to lieutenant colonel during the war as commander of 2nd Battalion, 106th Infantry Regiment and took part in several battles in the Pacific theater. After the war, he pursued a civilian career with the Universal Match Corporation while continuing to serve in the National Guard.

O'Hara served as assistant division commander of the 27th Armored Division from 1954 to 1957, and received promotion to brigadier general. In 1957, he was promoted to major general and assigned to command the division. In 1959, O'Hara was appointed Adjutant General of New York, and he served until retiring from the military in 1971. From 1971 to 1975, O'Hara was commissioner of the New York State Office of General Services and director of the New York State Emergency Fuel Office.

In retirement, O'Hara resided in Boynton Beach, Florida, and he was later a resident of a nursing home in Norway, Maine. He died in Norway on July 5, 1987, and was buried at Cedar Park Cemetery in Hudson.

== Early life ==
Almerin Cartwright O'Hara was born in Hudson, New York on November 10, 1910, a son of Michael Joseph O'Hara (1883–1928) and Anna Drew (Cartwright) O'Hara (1886–1973). O'Hara was named for his maternal grandfather Almerin W. Cartwright (1855–1919), a prominent store owner and postmaster of Roxbury, New York. O'Hara was raised and educated in Hudson; following the 1928 death of his father, he worked as a soda dispenser at McKinstry's Drug Store in Hudson. In the mid-to-late 1930s, O'Hara worked as an insurance agent.

O'Hara later pursued a civilian career with the Universal Match Company of Buffalo, New York; as a manager and executive, he had responsibility at different times for departments including sales and production. O'Hara was a director of the First National Bank of Hudson and a member of the Buffalo Chamber of Commerce. In addition, he was a member of the Buffalo Niagara Sales & Marketing Executives. O'Hara was also a member of the Sons of the American Revolution by right of descent from Samuel Wright of Sharon, Connecticut. Additionally, O'Hara was a member of the Freemasons, Rotary International, American Legion, and Veterans of Foreign Wars. In addition, he served as president of Hudson's Columbia County Golf and Country Club.

== Start of military career ==
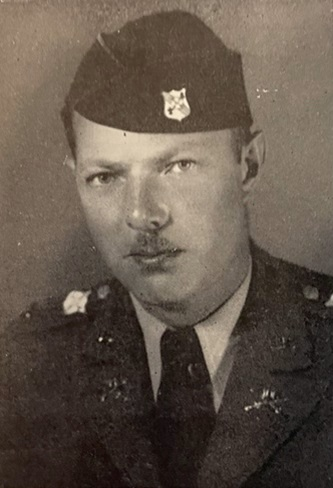
O'Hara as a first lieutenant in 1941

In March 1934, O'Hara joined the New York National Guard, enlisting as a private in Albany, New York's Headquarters Company, 10th Infantry Regiment. He was discharged as an enlisted soldier on May 31 so that on June 1 he could accept a commission as a second lieutenant of Infantry. On April 16, 1935, O'Hara's commission was confirmed in the National Guard of the United States. Prior to the start of World War II, he served with a 10th Infantry detachment in Hudson.

In October 1940, O'Hara entered active duty for World War II, and the 10th New York Infantry Regiment was federalized as the 106th Infantry Regiment, a unit of the 27th Infantry Division. In 1941, he completed the Communications Course for Infantry officers, and in 1943 he graduated from the United States Army Command and General Staff College.

O'Hara served in the Pacific theater throughout the war, including assignments as commander of the regimental Headquarters Company, regimental Intelligence officer (S-2), and regimental operations officer (S-3). O'Hara later commanded 2nd Battalion, 106th Infantry Regiment, and he took part in the Gilbert and Marshall Islands campaign, including the battles of Majuro, Saipan, Iejima, and Okinawa. Following the end of the war, O'Hara took part in the early stages of the Occupation of Japan.

== Continued military career ==
O'Hara had been promoted to lieutenant colonel by the end of the Second World War II, and in September 1945 he was released from active duty. He was then commissioned in the United States Army Reserve, where he served until April 1947, when he rejoined the New York National Guard. In 1946, he was an unsuccessful Democratic candidate for the New York State Assembly. He served on the staff of the 27th Infantry Division until July 1949, when he was promoted to colonel and assigned as the division's chief of staff. In 1950, he graduated from the Infantry Officer Advanced Course, and in April 1954 he was assigned as assistant division commander (ADC). He was promoted to brigadier general in August 1954, and completed the refresher Course for Armor Officers in 1955.

O'Hara served as ADC until April 1957, and during his time in this position, O'Hara helped lead the division's conversion from Infantry to the newly designated 27th Armored Division. In April 1957, O'Hara was appointed to command the 27th Armored Division, and in August 1957 he received promotion to major general. In 1958, he graduated from the Armor School's Senior Officer Preventive Maintenance Course. He commanded the division until August 1959.

In August 1959, O'Hara was appointed to succeed Ronald C. Brock as Adjutant General of New York. (Note: At the time, the official title was chief of staff to the governor of New York.) In 1966, O'Hara attended the Reserve Components Senior Officer Course at the United States Army War College. He placed the National Guard on alert in case a response to the 1967 New York City riot was required, but they were not activated. As adjutant general, O'Hara oversaw the participation of New York National Guard members in the Vietnam War, including an extended inspection tour of South Vietnam, Japan, and South Korea. In addition, he carried out assignments at the national level, including member of the Reserve Forces Policy Board. He retired from the military on January 31, 1971, and was succeeded by John C. Baker. In 1969, he received the National Guard Association of the United States (NGAUS) Distinguished Service Medal to recognize his leadership as New York's adjutant general and his contributions to NGAUS policy and program initiatives.

== Later civilian career ==
After retiring as adjutant general, O'Hara was appointed Commissioner of the New York State Office of General Services, succeeding Cortlandt V. R. Schuyler. As commissioner, one of O'Hara's top priorities was overseeing completion of the Empire State Plaza state office complex. During the Attica Prison riot in September 1971, Governor Nelson Rockefeller dispatched O'Hara to the scene as his personal representative. O'Hara was the liaison between Rockefeller, local officials, and the New York State Police, and the riot and inmate takeover ended after state police and other law enforcement officers used force to retake control of the prison.

In July 1973, Rockefeller assigned O'Hara the additional duty of state anti-drug program coordinator. In February 1974, Governor Malcolm Wilson named O'Hara as director of the New York State Emergency Fuel Office, an agency created to coordinate the state response to the energy crisis that had begun in 1973. He served in this position while continuing to serve as General Services commissioner. O'Hara left office in September 1975, and was succeeded by James C. O'Shea.

In 1975, Albany County adopted a county executive position to lead its government. In that year's election for the first county executive, whose term would start on January 1, 1976, O'Hara, then a resident of Albany, won the Republican nomination and faced Democratic nominee James J. Coyne Jr., who was then serving as county clerk, and Liberal nominee Theresa Cooke, county treasurer and a critic of the county and city Democratic machine run by Daniel P. O'Connell. Coyne won the general election, with Cooke finishing second and O'Hara third.

== Retirement and death ==
In retirement, O'Hara resided in Boynton Beach, Florida. He later resided at a nursing home in Norway, Maine. O'Hara died in Norway on July 5, 1987. He was buried at Cedar Park Cemetery in Hudson.

== Awards ==
O'Hara's awards and decorations included:

- Army Distinguished Service Medal
- Silver Star
- Bronze Star Medal with oak leaf cluster
- American Defense Service Medal
- Asiatic–Pacific Campaign Medal
- Combat Infantryman Badge

== Effective dates of promotion ==
- Private (National Guard), March 5, 1934
- Second Lieutenant (National Guard), June 1, 1934
- Second Lieutenant (National Guard of the United States), April 16, 1935
- First Lieutenant (National Guard), October 14, 1940
- First Lieutenant (Army), October 15, 1940
- Captain, (Army), March 11, 1942
- Major, (Army), March 1, 1943
- Lieutenant Colonel (Army), January 30, 1945
- Lieutenant Colonel (Reserve), September 28, 1945
- Lieutenant Colonel (National Guard), April 21, 1947
- Colonel (National Guard), July 21, 1949
- Brigadier General (National Guard), December 8, 1954
- Major General (National Guard), November 19, 1957
- Major General (Retired), January 31, 1971
