= David C. Waybur =

United States Army Medal of Honor recipient

David Crowder Waybur
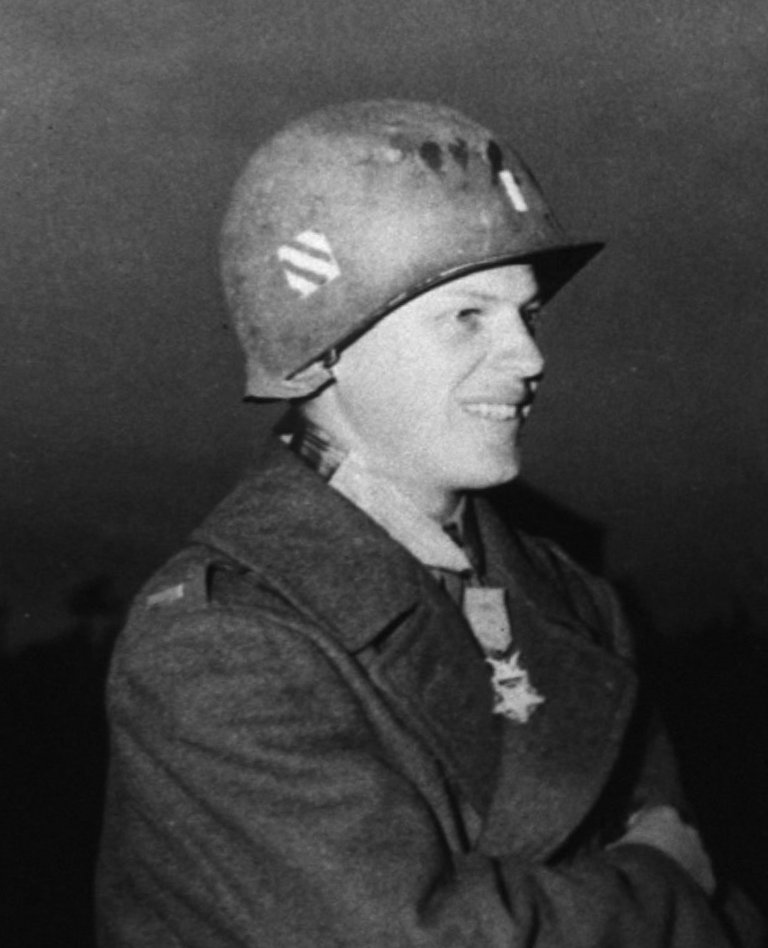
- Born: September 29, 1919; Oakland, California
- Died: March 28, 1945 (aged 25); Germany
- Burial place: Lorraine American Cemetery and Memorial, Saint-Avold, France
- Military career
- Allegiance: United States of America
- Branch: United States Army
- Service years: 1940–1945
- Rank: First Lieutenant
- Units: 3rd Reconnaissance Troop, 3rd Infantry Division
- Conflicts: World War II • Allied invasion of Sicily • Western Allied invasion of Germany
- Awards: Medal of Honor; Silver Star; Purple Heart

David Crowder Waybur (September 29, 1919 – March 28, 1945) was a United States Army officer and a recipient of the United States military's highest decoration—the Medal of Honor—for his actions in World War II. During the Allied invasion of Sicily, he led his small patrol in its defense against an attack by four Italian tanks. Despite being seriously wounded, he continued to lead and personally disabled a tank with only a Tommy gun. After receiving the Medal of Honor for these actions, he returned to combat and was killed in action in Germany.

== Biography ==
Waybur was from Piedmont, California and worked as a grocery store clerk and ranch hand in his teenage years. After high school, he enrolled in the University of California, Berkeley, where he continued a family tradition of joining Beta Theta Pi fraternity. He enlisted in the Army as a private on November 22, 1940, but later became a commissioned officer. By the time of the Allied invasion of Sicily in July 1943, he was a first lieutenant commanding the 3rd Reconnaissance Troop, 3rd Infantry Division.

On the night of July 17, 1943, one week after the invasion of Sicily began, Waybur volunteered to lead a reconnaissance patrol into enemy territory near Agrigento in order to locate a missing Ranger unit. The patrol, consisting of three Jeeps, was cut off and attacked by four Italian tanks. In the ensuing firefight, Waybur and three of his men were wounded, Waybur seriously so. When the patrol's three machine guns ran out of ammunition, he ordered his men to take cover and single-handedly disabled one tank by standing in the open and killing its crew with a Thompson submachine gun. After sending one patrol member to get help, Waybur continued to lead his men in holding off the three remaining tanks through the night. American reinforcements arrived in the morning, and the Italian tanks withdrew. Three months later, on October 21, Waybur was issued the Medal of Honor for his actions during the battle. The medal was formally presented to him by Lieutenant General Mark Wayne Clark, commander of the Fifth Army, during a ceremony in North Africa later that year.

Waybur was sent back to the United States to work on war bond tours, but he eventually asked to be returned to combat duty. He was killed in action in Germany on March 28, 1945—two years after earning the Medal of Honor. Waybur was buried at the Lorraine American Cemetery and Memorial in Saint-Avold, France. In addition to the Medal of Honor, he had also received the Silver Star and a Purple Heart.

== Medal of Honor citation ==
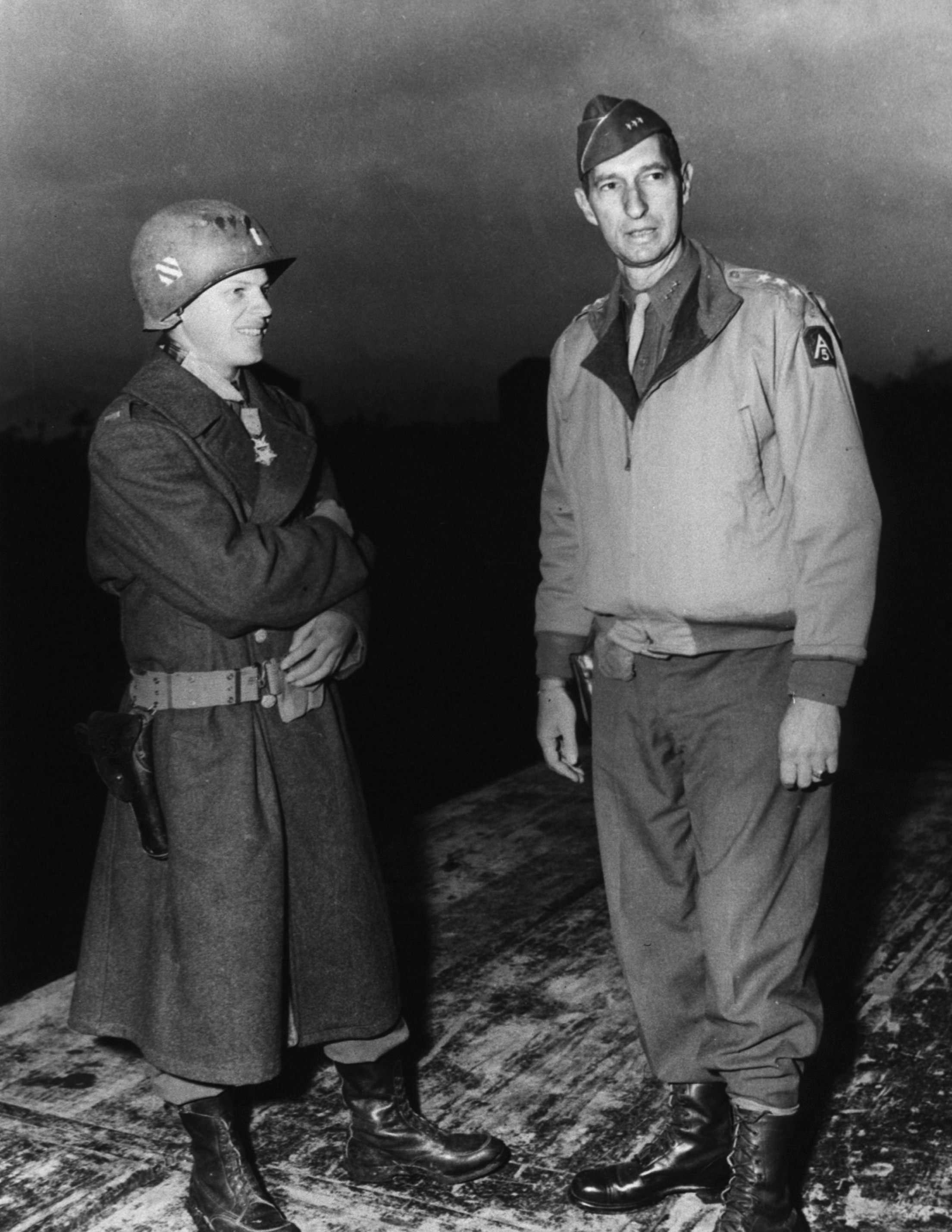
Waybur chats with Mark W. Clark, who presented him with the Medal of Honor.

First Lieutenant Waybur's official Medal of Honor citation reads:

For conspicuous gallantry and intrepidity at the risk of life above and beyond the call of duty in action involving actual conflict with the enemy. Commander of a reconnaissance platoon, 1st Lt. Waybur volunteered to lead a 3-vehicle patrol into enemy-held territory to locate an isolated Ranger unit. Proceeding under cover of darkness, over roads known to be heavily mined, and strongly defended by road blocks and machinegun positions, the patrol's progress was halted at a bridge which had been destroyed by enemy troops and was suddenly cut off from its supporting vehicles by 4 enemy tanks. Although hopelessly outnumbered and out-gunned, and himself and his men completely exposed, he quickly dispersed his vehicles and ordered his gunners to open fire with their .30 and .50 caliber machineguns. Then, with ammunition exhausted, 3 of his men hit and himself seriously wounded, he seized his .45 caliber Thompson submachinegun and standing in the bright moonlight directly in the line of fire, alone engaged the leading tank at 30 yards and succeeded in killing the crewmembers, causing the tank to run onto the bridge and crash into the stream bed. After dispatching 1 of the men for aid he rallied the rest to cover and withstood the continued fire of the tanks till the arrival of aid the following morning.

== See also ==
- List of Medal of Honor recipients for World War II
