= Cortlandt V. R. Schuyler =

United States general (1900–1993)

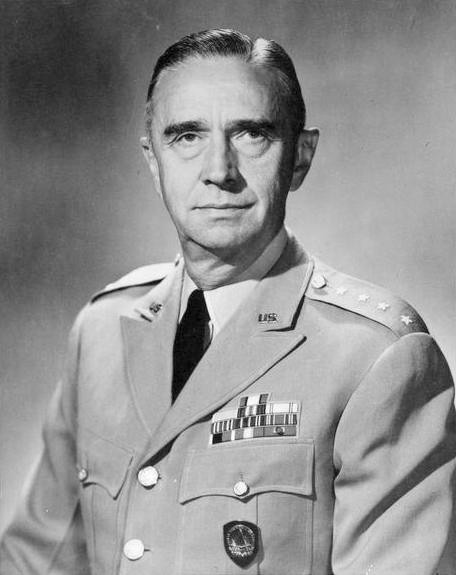
- Born: Cortlandt Van Rensselaer Schuyler; 22 December 1900; Mount Arlington, New Jersey
- Died: 4 December 1993 (aged 92); San Antonio, Texas
- Burial place: West Point Cemetery, West Point, New York
- Education: United States Military Academy
- Spouses: Wynona Coykendall (m. 1923; died 1981) Helen V. R. Stillman Honnen (m. 1981)
- Military career
- Allegiance: United States
- Branch: United States Army
- Service years: 1922–1959
- Rank: General
- Nickname: Cort
- Commands: 28th Infantry Division
- Awards: Distinguished Service Medal; Legion of Merit; French Legion of Honor (Grand Cross)
- Other work: Commissioner, New York State Office of General Services

Cortlandt Van Rensselaer Schuyler (22 December 1900 – 4 December 1993) was a United States Army four-star general who served as Chief of Staff, Supreme Headquarters Allied Powers Europe (COFS SHAPE) from 1953 to 1959.

== Early life ==
Schuyler was born in Mount Arlington, New Jersey, on 22 December 1900. He was the son of Frank Herbert Schuyler (1865–1942) and Harriette Jarvis Ferris (née Fosdick) Schuyler (1865–1919). His father was the president of the Federal Bridge Company for a decade before his death in 1942.

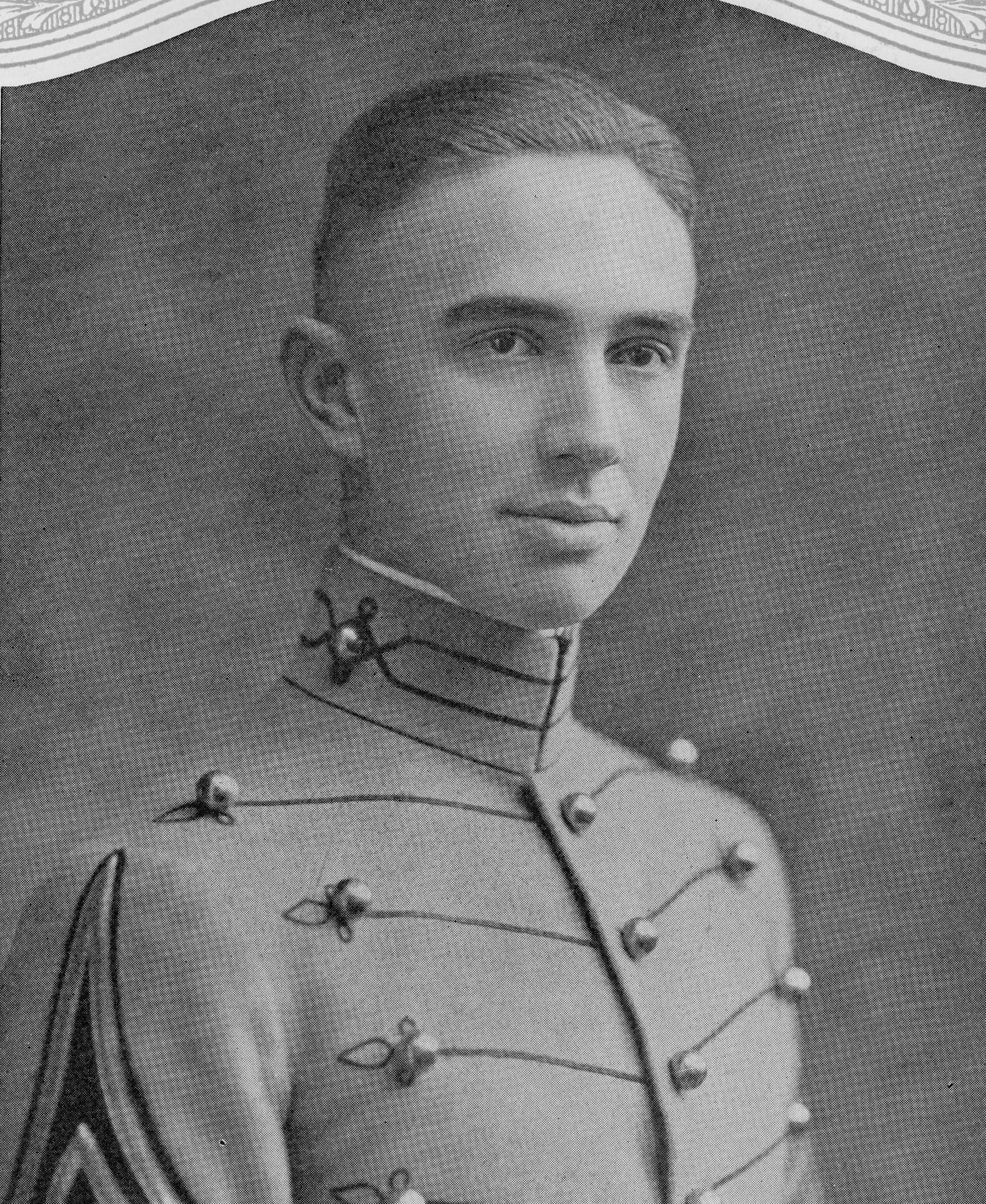
At West Point in 1922

Schuyler was a descendant of the prominent Schuyler, Van Cortlandt, and Van Rensselaer families of upstate New York. His fifth great-grandparents were Kiliaen Van Rensselaer and Maria Van Cortlandt, the daughter of Stephanus van Cortlandt and Gertrude Schuyler, a daughter of Schuyler family progenitor Philip Pieterse Schuyler.

He attended Columbia High School in Maplewood, New Jersey. He graduated from the United States Military Academy in 1922, where he finished 11th in a class of 102, and was commissioned in the Coast Artillery Corps.

== Career ==
His first assignment was at Fort Monroe, Virginia, where he was assigned to the 61st Antiaircraft Battalion, at the time the only anti-aircraft unit in the army. Later he served with the 60th Coast Artillery (antiaircraft) in the Philippines and the 4th Coast Artillery (Antiaircraft) at Fort Amador in the Panama Canal Zone. He graduated from the United States Army Command and General Staff College in 1937.

In 1939, while a member of the Antiaircraft section of the Coast Artillery Board, he participated actively in the development of the first multiple, power-operated antiaircraft machine gun mount.(Quadmount), He was awarded the Legion of Merit for his work in this field.

In 1942, Schuyler was assigned to the Antiaircraft Command in Richmond, Virginia, in 1942. He was promoted to brigadier general and assigned as chief of staff of the Antiaircraft Command. The Antiaircraft Command had the task of organizing and training all antiaircraft units of a rapidly expanding Army and controlled eight large training centers from Massachusetts to California.

In the fall of 1944, General Schuyler was assigned to Bucharest, Romania, as the U.S. Military Representative to the Allied Control Commission. The agency was created by the three interested allied governments (British, U.S. and Russian) to administer the terms of the Romanian armistice.

=== Return to Washington ===
In 1947, General Schuyler returned to Washington and was assigned as the Chief of the Plans and Policy Group, Army General Staff. It was in this position that he became heavily involved in the fast developing concept of the North Atlantic alliance. He assisted in the preparation of policy papers and participated in the discussions which, in 1949, culminated in the creation of the North Atlantic Treaty Organization (NATO). When General of the Army Dwight D. Eisenhower was appointed as the Supreme Commander of all NATO forces in Europe, General Schuyler was part of Eisenhower's staff as the special assistant to the chief of staff.

In 1952, Schuyler was promoted to major general and given command of the 28th Infantry Division in 1953.

In July 1953, he was promoted to lieutenant general and assigned to SHAPE headquarters in Paris as the Chief of Staff to Supreme Allied Commander General Alfred M. Gruenther. Schuyler was promoted to general in 1956 and remained as the chief of staff for the new Supreme Commander, General Lauris Norstad, until his retirement from the Army in November 1959.

=== Post military career ===
After retiring from the army in 1959, Schuyler served as Commissioner of the New York State Office of General Services from 1960 to 1971, and was an executive aide to New York Governor Nelson Rockefeller. As commissioner, his major priority was overseeing construction of the Empire State Plaza state office complex. He was succeeded as commissioner by Almerin C. O'Hara.

In 1962, Rockefeller appointed Schuyler chairman of his Emergency Staff committee and ordered it to meet as needed in support of President John F. Kennedy's administration during the Cuban Missile Crisis. In 1963, he was appointed chairman of the State Civil Defense Commission.

== Personal life ==
Schuyler was married twice, first to Wynona Coykendall (1902–1981), the daughter of Electra (née Heaton) Coykendall and Louis T. Coykendall, a vice-president of Presbrey-Leland, Inc. Together, they had a daughter and a son:

- Shirley Schuyler (1929–2006), who married Edward Stanley Saxby, son of Harold A. Saxby, in 1949.
- Philip Van Rensselaer Schuyler (b. 1932)

After his first wife's death, he married Helen Van Rensselaer (née Stillman) Honnen (1905–1994), who was previously married to Major General George Honnen.

Schuyler died on 4 December 1993, in San Antonio, Texas. He was buried at West Point Cemetery, Section 8, Row C, Site 172. At his death, he was survived by his wife, two children, and two stepchildren.

== Awards ==

1st Row	Distinguished Service Medal		
2nd Row	Legion of Merit	World War I Victory Medal	American Defense Service Medal
3rd Row	American Campaign Medal	European-African-Middle Eastern Campaign Medal	World War II Victory Medal
4th Row	Army of Occupation Medal	National Defense Service Medal	Legion of Honor (Grand-croix)

== Dates of rank ==
No insignia	Cadet, United States Military Academy: 4 November 1918
	Second Lieutenant, Regular Army: 13 June 1922
	First Lieutenant, Regular Army: 11 March 1927
	Captain, Regular Army: 1 August 1935
	Major, Regular Army: 1 July 1940
	Lieutenant Colonel, Army of the United States: 24 December 1941
	Colonel, Army of the United States: 28 August 1942
	Brigadier General, Army of the United States: 28 June 1943
	Major General, Army of the United States: 18 January 1944
	Lieutenant Colonel, Regular Army: 13 June 1945
	Brigadier General, Regular Army: 26 July 1949
	Major General, Regular Army: 1 June 1952
	Lieutenant General, Army of the United States: 3 July 1953
	General, Army of the United States: 18 May 1956
	General, Regular Army, Retired List: 1 November 1959

== See also ==
- Schuyler family
