= Lorraine American Cemetery and Memorial =

ABMC World War II cemetery in France

- American Battle Monuments Commission
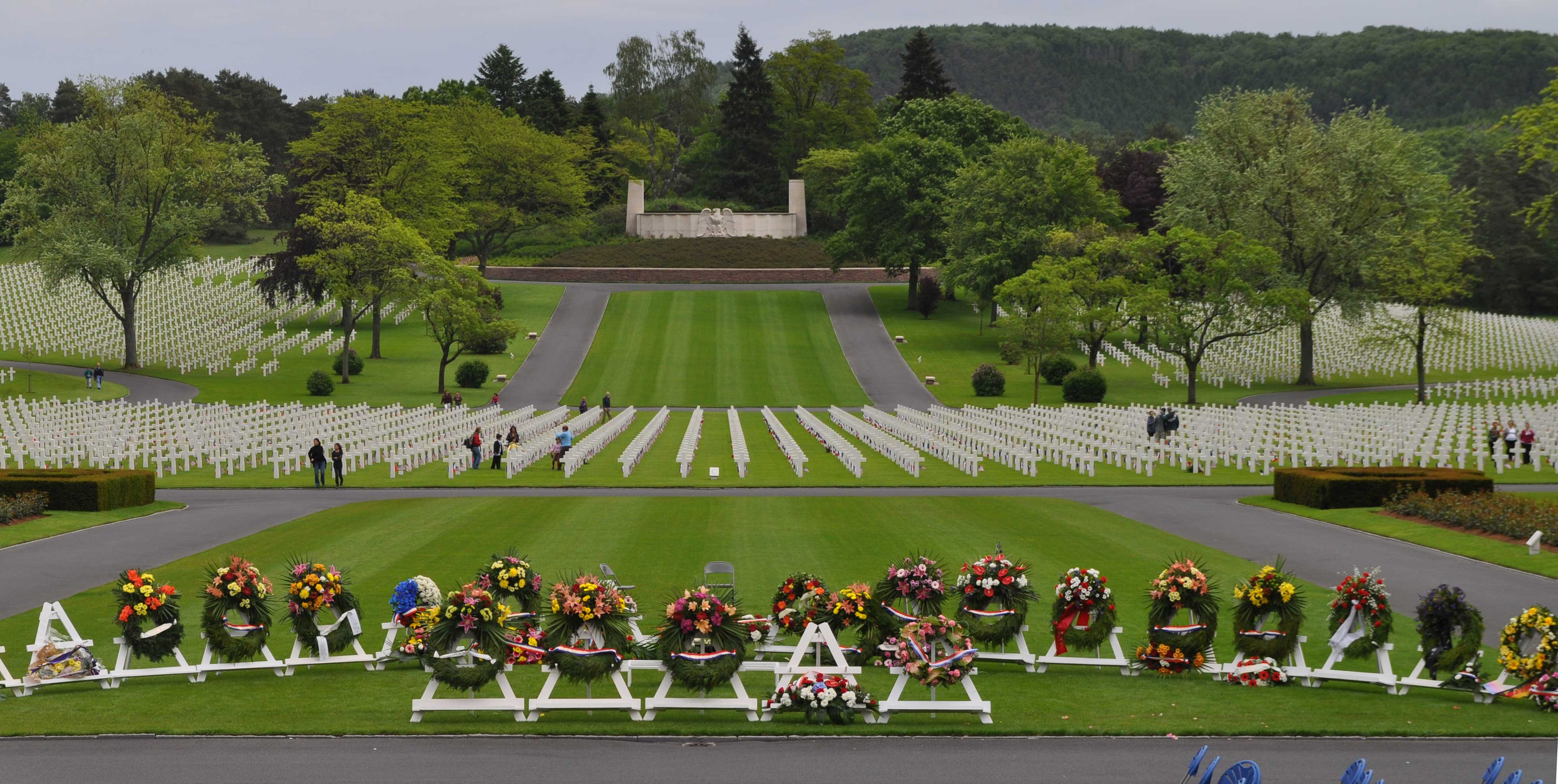
- Lorraine American Military Cemetery, Memorial Day 2010, ceremonial wreaths
- Used for those deceased 1944–1945
- Established: September 1944; 81 years ago (Completed 1960; 66 years ago)
- Location: 49°7′19″N 6°43′3″E near Saint-Avold, Moselle, France
- Designed by: Murphy & Locraft, Washington, D.C. (Monument); Allyn R. Jennings of Oley, Pennsylvania (Landscaping)
- Total burials: 10,481
- Commemorated: 444

Burials by nation
- United States

Burials by war
- World War II

Lorraine American Cemetery and Memorial is a Second World War American military war grave cemetery, located just outside Saint-Avold, Moselle, France. The cemetery, containing 10,481 American soldiers KIA (the second largest number of American burials in Europe, after the Meuse-Argonne American Cemetery of World War I dead, with 14,246), covers 113.5 acres (45.9 ha), was dedicated in 1960. It is administered by the American Battle Monuments Commission.

== History ==
During and shortly after the war over 16,000 American casualties were interred across the Saint Avold region in France. Those interred at the Lorraine American Cemetery died mostly in the autumn of 1944 during the Allied advance from Paris to the Rhine as the Americans sought to expel the Germans from fortress city of Metz and advance on the Siegfried Line during the latter stages of World War II. They were mainly part of the U.S. Third and Seventh Armies.

In the late 1940s many bodies from the Saint Avold region were repatriated to the US or concentrated at Lorraine.

== Layout ==
The cemetery's headstones are arranged in nine plots forming an elliptical design ending with an overlook feature. A memorial has ceramic operations maps with narratives and service flags. Either side of the memorial are Tablets of the Missing commemorating 444 soldiers missing in action (rosettes mark those since recovered and identified).

== Notable burials ==
- Medal of Honor recipients
  - Sergeant Salvador J. Lara (1920–1945 †), awarded the medal in 2014
  - Sergeant Andrew Miller (1916–1944 †), awarded the medal in 1945
  - Private Frederick C. Murphy (1918–1945 †), awarded the medal in 1946
  - Sergeant Ruben Rivers (c. 1921–1944 †), awarded the medal in 1977
  - Lieutenant David C. Waybur (1919–1945 †), awarded the medal in 1943 and killed in action 19 months later
- Others
  - Lieutenant Al Blozis (1919–1945 †), football player
  - Lieutenant Willard Bowsky (1907–1944 †), animator
  - Private Charley Havlat (1910–1945 †), last American to die before the German surrender on 7 May
  - Major George Preddy (1919–1944 †), flying ace, buried next to his brother Lieutenant William Preddy (1924–1945 †)

Anecdote: Sheltered from view, hidden by trees in a place a little apart, is a small vegetable garden created in 1962 by Bouaroua Aissa, gardener of the cemetery. More than 60 years later, this garden still exists and is maintained by another gardener who perpetuates Aissa's work.

== Gallery ==
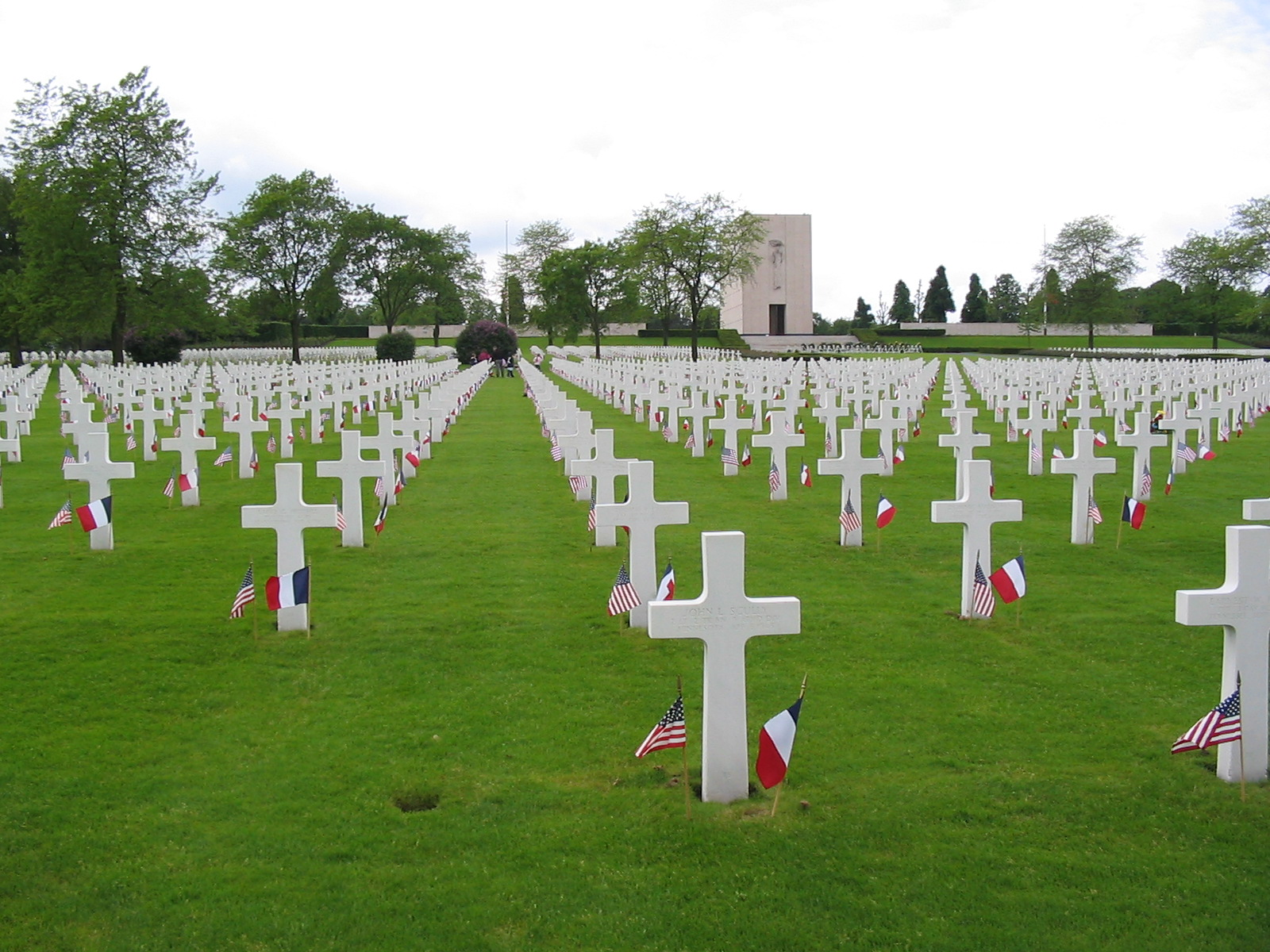
Facing southeast, toward the rear of the memorial

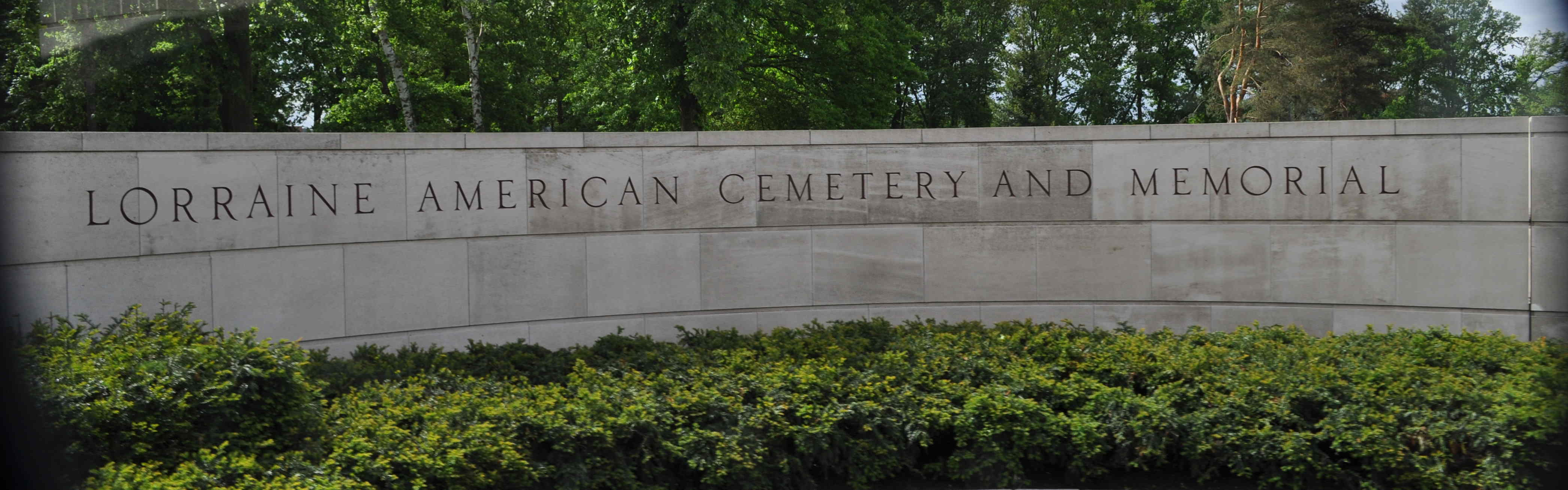
Lorraine American Military Cemetery, entrance sign

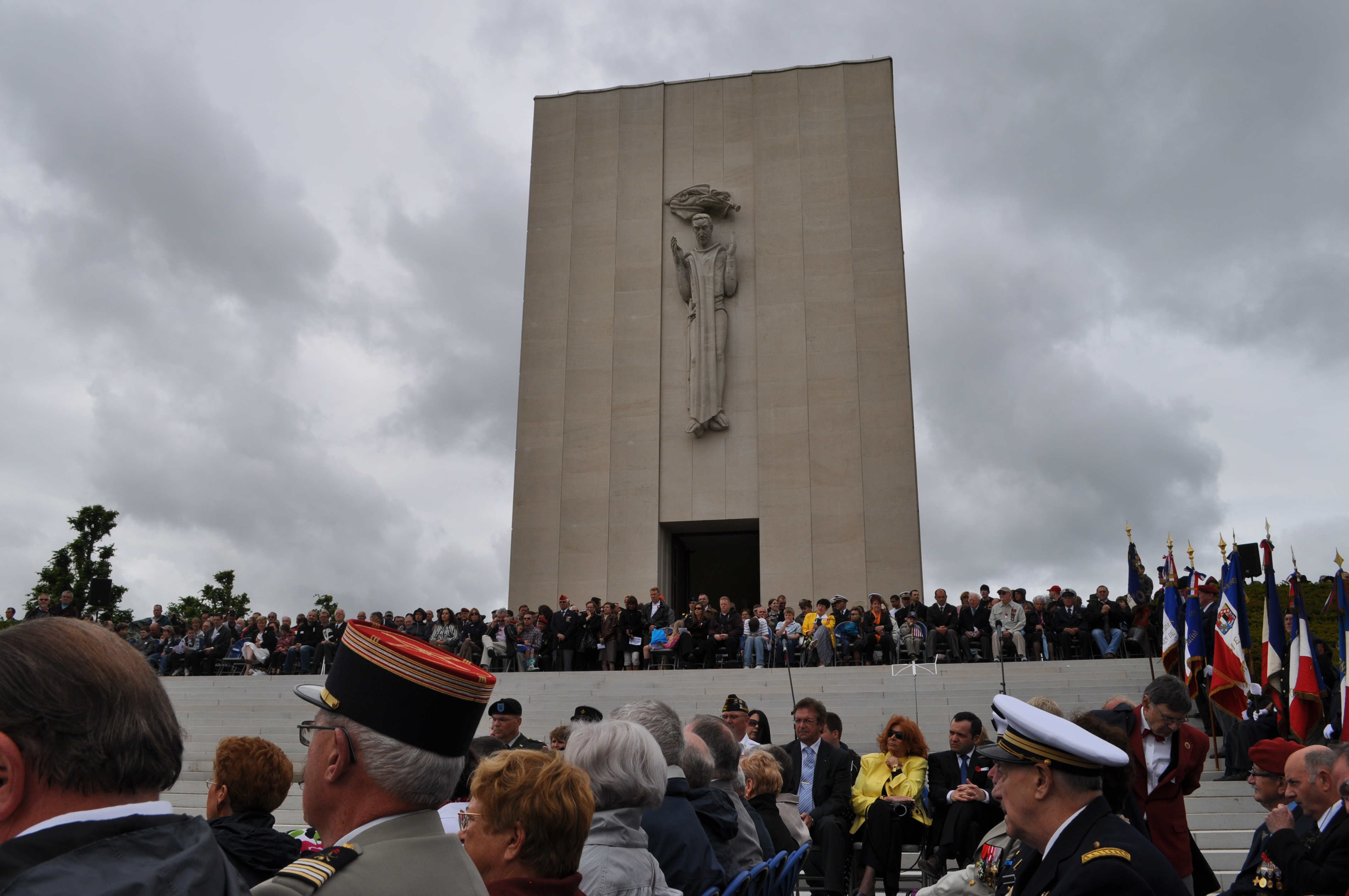
Lorraine American Military Cemetery, chapel

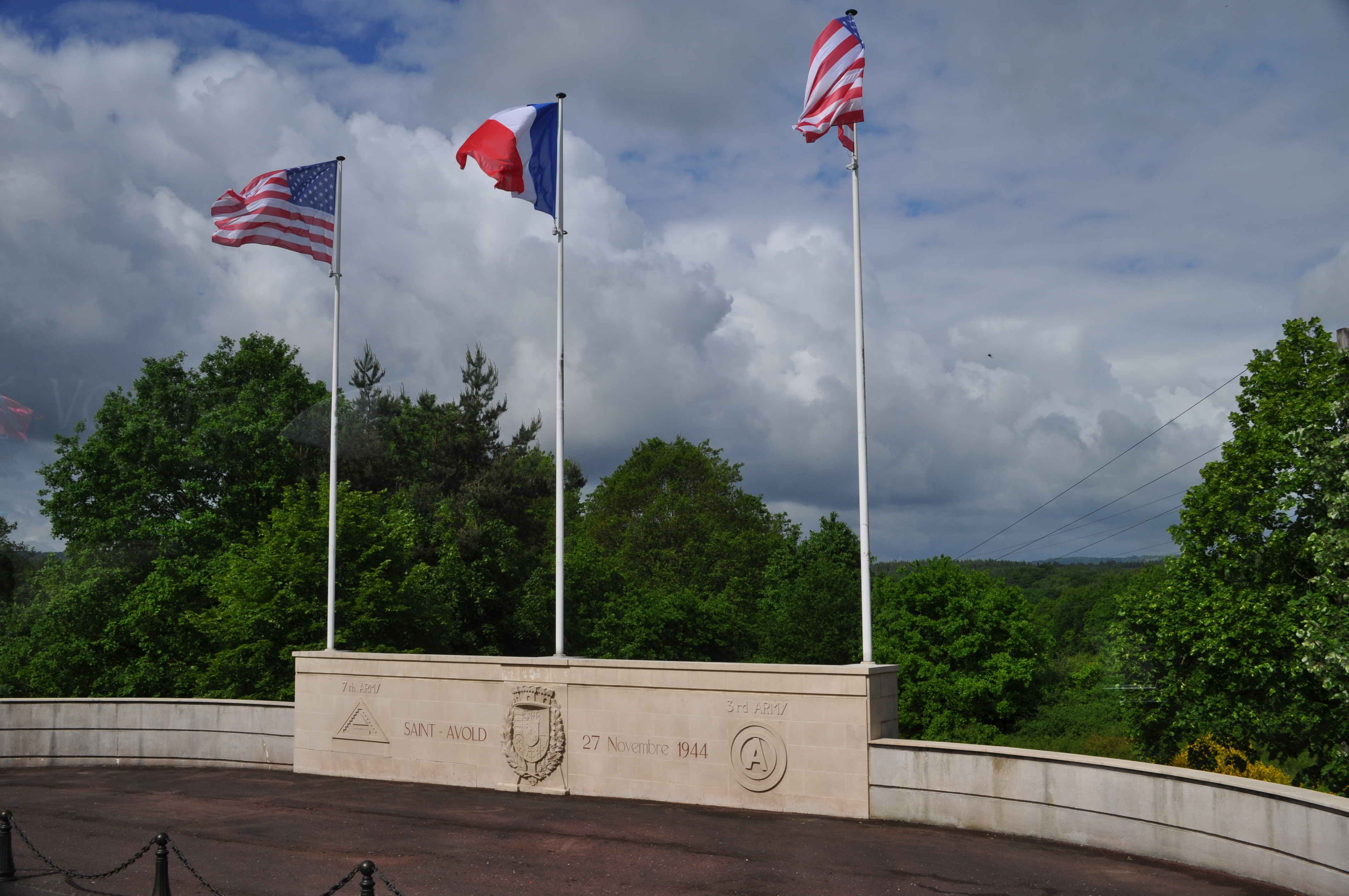
Lorraine American Military Cemetery, St-Avold, American and French flags
