= Ořechov (Žďár nad Sázavou District) =

- Municipality
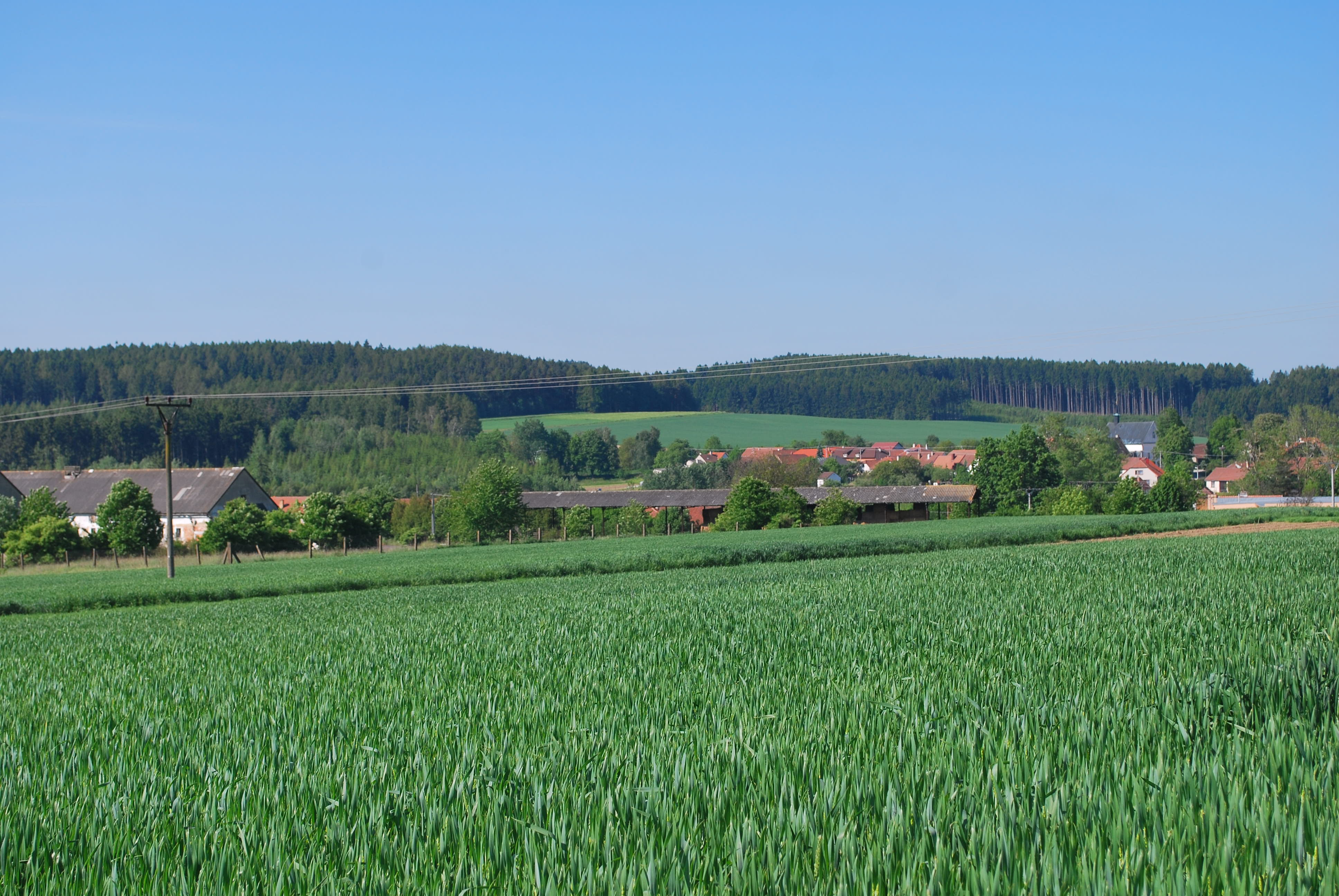
- General view

- Flag Coat of arms

- Location in the Czech Republic
- Coordinates: 49°21′2″N 16°8′20″E
- Country: Czech Republic
- Region: Vysočina
- District: Žďár nad Sázavou
- First mentioned: 1366

Area
  - Total: 5.35 km^{2} (2.07 sq mi)
- Elevation: 549 m (1,801 ft)

Population (2026-01-01)
  - Total: 336
  - Density: 62.8/km^{2} (163/sq mi)
- Time zone: UTC+1 (CET)
  - Summer (DST): UTC+2 (CEST)
- Postal code: 594 52
- Website: www.orechov-ronov.cz

Ořechov is a municipality and village in Žďár nad Sázavou District in the Vysočina Region of the Czech Republic. It has about 300 inhabitants.

Ořechov lies approximately 28 kilometres (17 mi) south-east of Žďár nad Sázavou, 40 km (25 mi) east of Jihlava, and 148 km (92 mi) south-east of Prague.

== Administrative division ==
Ořechov consists of two municipal parts (in brackets population according to the 2021 census):

- Ořechov (224)
- Ronov (87)

== Demographics ==
Historical population
Year	Pop.	±%
1869	474	—
1880	505	+6.5%
1890	428	−15.2%
1900	463	+8.2%
1910	449	−3.0%
1921	458	+2.0%
1930	426	−7.0%
1950	424	−0.5%
1961	427	+0.7%
1970	398	−6.8%
1980	346	−13.1%
1991	321	−7.2%
2001	310	−3.4%
2011	309	−0.3%
2021	311	+0.6%
Source: Censuses
