= Frederick C. Murphy =

United States Army Medal of Honor recipient

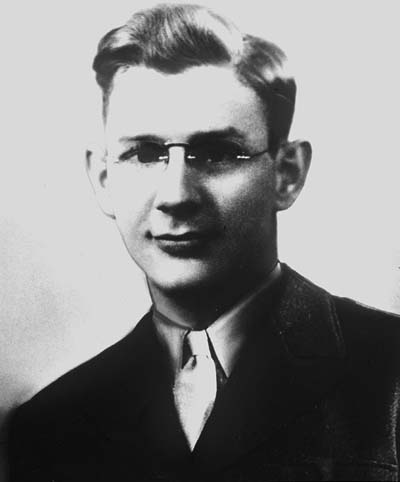
- Private First Class Frederick Murphy
- Born: July 27, 1918; Boston, Massachusetts, US
- Died: March 19, 1945 (aged 26); Saarlautern, Germany
- Burial place: Lorraine American Cemetery and Memorial, Saint-Avold, Moselle, France
- Military career
- Allegiance: United States of America
- Branch: United States Army
- Service years: 1943-1945
- Rank: Private First Class
- Units: 259th Infantry, 65th Infantry Division
- Conflicts: World War II
- Awards: Medal of Honor; Purple Heart with oak leaf cluster Bronze Star Medal; Good Conduct Medal; European–African–Middle Eastern Campaign Medal with bronze service star American Campaign Medal

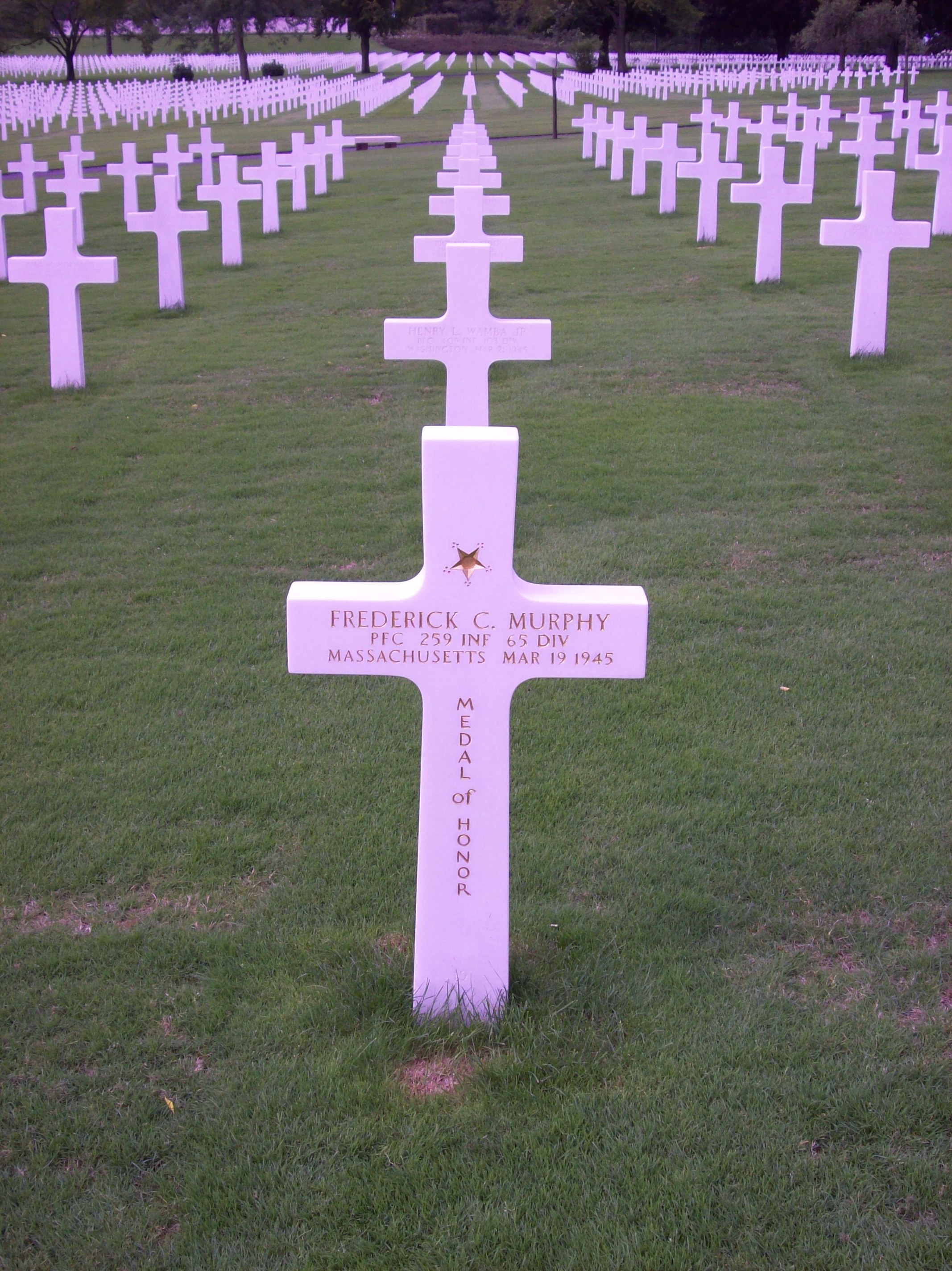
Murphy's grave in Lorraine, France

Frederick C. Murphy (July 27, 1918 – March 19, 1945) was a recipient of the Medal of Honor during World War II while serving as a medic in the US 65th Infantry Division.

== Background ==
Murphy was born in Boston, Massachusetts, and lived in Quincy and attended the Thayer Academy in Braintree from where he graduated in 1939. He entered the University of Pennsylvania later that year. The Japanese attack on Pearl Harbor in 1941 caused him to attempt to enlist with the U.S. Army. He was denied after failing two physical examinations and classified 4-F. After surgery to correct back problems, he successfully enlisted in November 1943 at Weymouth where he then lived. He became a medic in the U.S. Army 259th Infantry of the 65th Infantry Division. His basic training was at Camp Shelby, Mississippi, and his medical and surgical technician training was at the Fitzsimons General Hospital in Aurora, Colorado.

== Medal of Honor citation ==
- Rank and organization: Private First Class, U.S. Army, Medical Detachment, 259th Infantry, 65th Infantry Division.
- Place and date: Siegfried Line at Saarlautern, Germany, March 18, 1945.
- Entered service at: Weymouth, Mass.
- Birth: Boston, Mass.
- G.O. No.: 21, February 26, 1946.
- Citation:An aid man, he was wounded in the right shoulder soon after his comrades had jumped off in a dawn attack 18 March 1945, against the Siegfried Line at Saarlautern, Germany. He refused to withdraw for treatment and continued forward, administering first aid under heavy machinegun, mortar, and artillery fire. When the company ran into a thickly sown antipersonnel minefield and began to suffer more and more casualties, he continued to disregard his own wound and unhesitatingly braved the danger of exploding mines, moving about through heavy fire and helping the injured until he stepped on a mine which severed one of his feet. In spite of his grievous wounds, he struggled on with his work, refusing to be evacuated and crawling from man to man administering to them while in great pain and bleeding profusely. He was killed by the blast of another mine which he had dragged himself across in an effort to reach still another casualty. With indomitable courage, and unquenchable spirit of self-sacrifice and supreme devotion to duty which made it possible for him to continue performing his tasks while barely able to move, Pfc. Murphy saved many of his fellow soldiers at the cost of his own life.

PFC Murphy is buried at Lorraine Cemetery north of Saint-Avold, Lorraine, France. He left a wife and a daughter born two months after his death.

== Awards and decorations ==

Badge	Combat Medical Badge		
1st row	Medal of Honor		
2nd row	Bronze Star Medal	Purple Heart with 1 Oak leaf cluster	Army Good Conduct Medal
3rd row	American Campaign Medal	European–African–Middle Eastern Campaign Medal with 3 Campaign stars	World War II Victory Medal

== Namesakes ==
A victory ship, hull number 821, (VC2-S-AP2/WSAT) the USAT Private Frederick C Murphy, was named in his honor. The ship had originally been named SS Maritime Victory when it launched in 1945. It displaced 7,607 gross tons, and had an overall length of 455 feet, and beam of 62 feet. This ship was moored at Beaumont Reserve (Texas) and was sold for scrap in 2008.

Murphy Barracks in Stuttgart Germany was named for Pvt. Murphy.

The National Archives facility in Waltham, Massachusetts was named the Frederick C. Murphy Federal Center to honor Murphy.

Frederick C. Murphy Primary school in Weymouth, MA.

Murphy was honored by his alma mater and University of Pennsylvania Class of 1943 classmates at their 55th reunion in 1998 by (a) featuring his name as the most prominent name on the rebuilt University of Pennsylvania War Memorial on South 33rd Street, at the gateway to The Palestra and Franklin Field, and (b) dedicating to Murphy their class gift by naming the revamped circulation area at Penn's main Van Pelt Library as the Frederick C. Murphy circulation area.

== See also ==
- List of Medal of Honor recipients
