= Erlauf (municipality) =

- Municipality
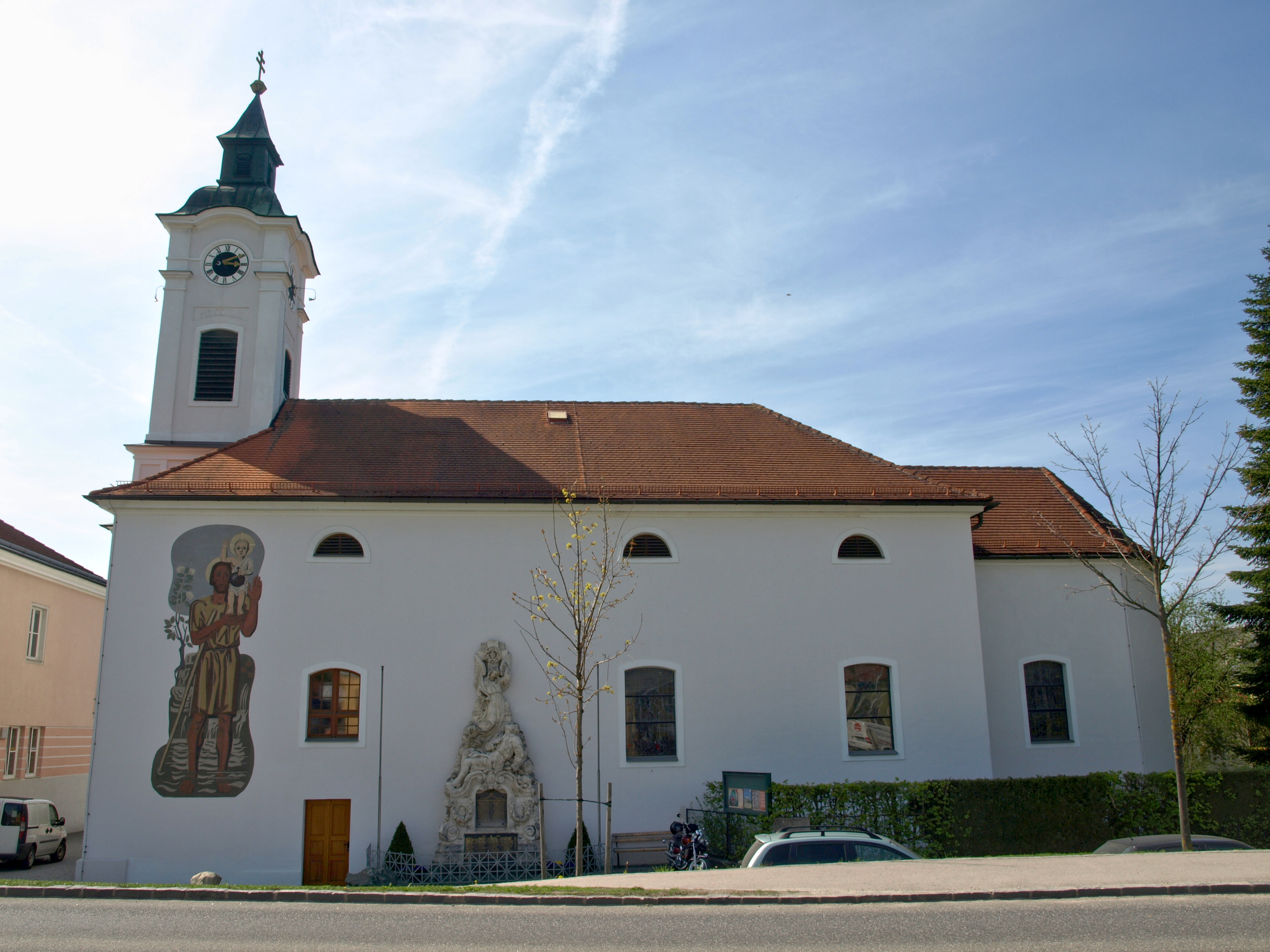
- Erlauf parish church

- Location within Austria
- Coordinates: 48°11′N 15°11′E
- Country: Austria
- State: Lower Austria
- District: Melk

Government
  - Mayor: Franz Engelmaier

Area
  - Total: 9.67 km^{2} (3.73 sq mi)
- Elevation: 225 m (738 ft)

Population (2018-01-01)
  - Total: 1,069
  - Density: 111/km^{2} (286/sq mi)
- Time zone: UTC+1 (CET)
  - Summer (DST): UTC+2 (CEST)
- Postal code: 3253
- Area code: 02757
- Website: www.riskommunal.at/erlauf

Erlauf is a municipality in the district of Melk in the Austrian state of Lower Austria.

== Population ==
Historical population
Year	Pop.	±%
1971	1,118	—
1981	1,061	−5.1%
1991	1,085	+2.3%
2001	1,140	+5.1%
