= New York Army National Guard =

Component of the US Army and military of the U.S. state of New York

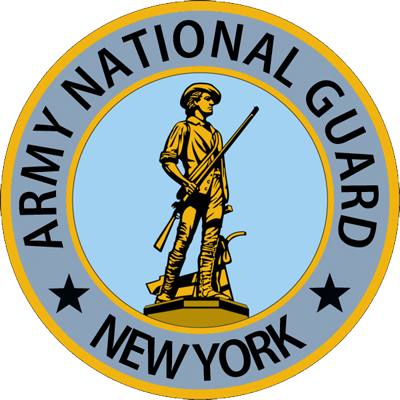
- Seal of the New York Army National Guard
- Active: 1906–present
- Country: United States
- Allegiance: (New York (state)) New York
- Branch: United States Army
- Role: United States Army National Guard
- Part of: New York National Guard
- Garrison/HQ: Latham, New York

Commanders
- Current commander: Major General Raymond F. Shields
- Command Chief Warrant Officer: Chief Warrant Officer 5 William J. Solmo
- Command Sergeant Major: Command Sergeant Major Leylan Jones

Insignia
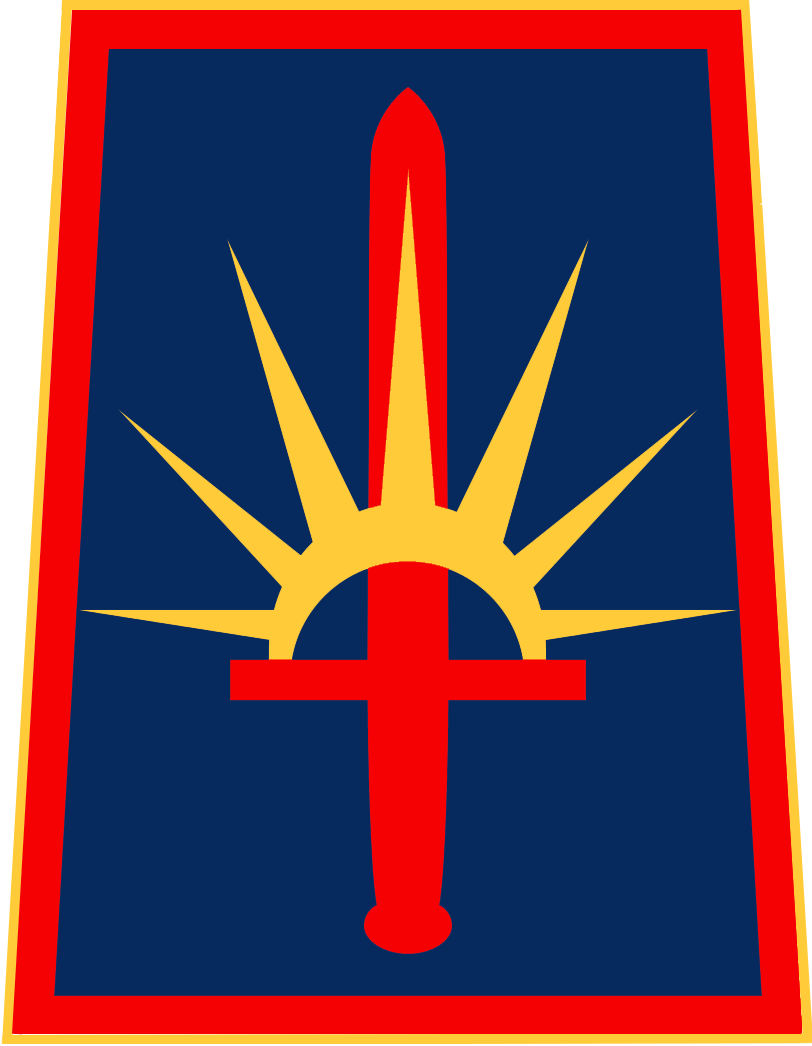
- SSI of the New York Army National Guard

- New York Army National Guard Crest

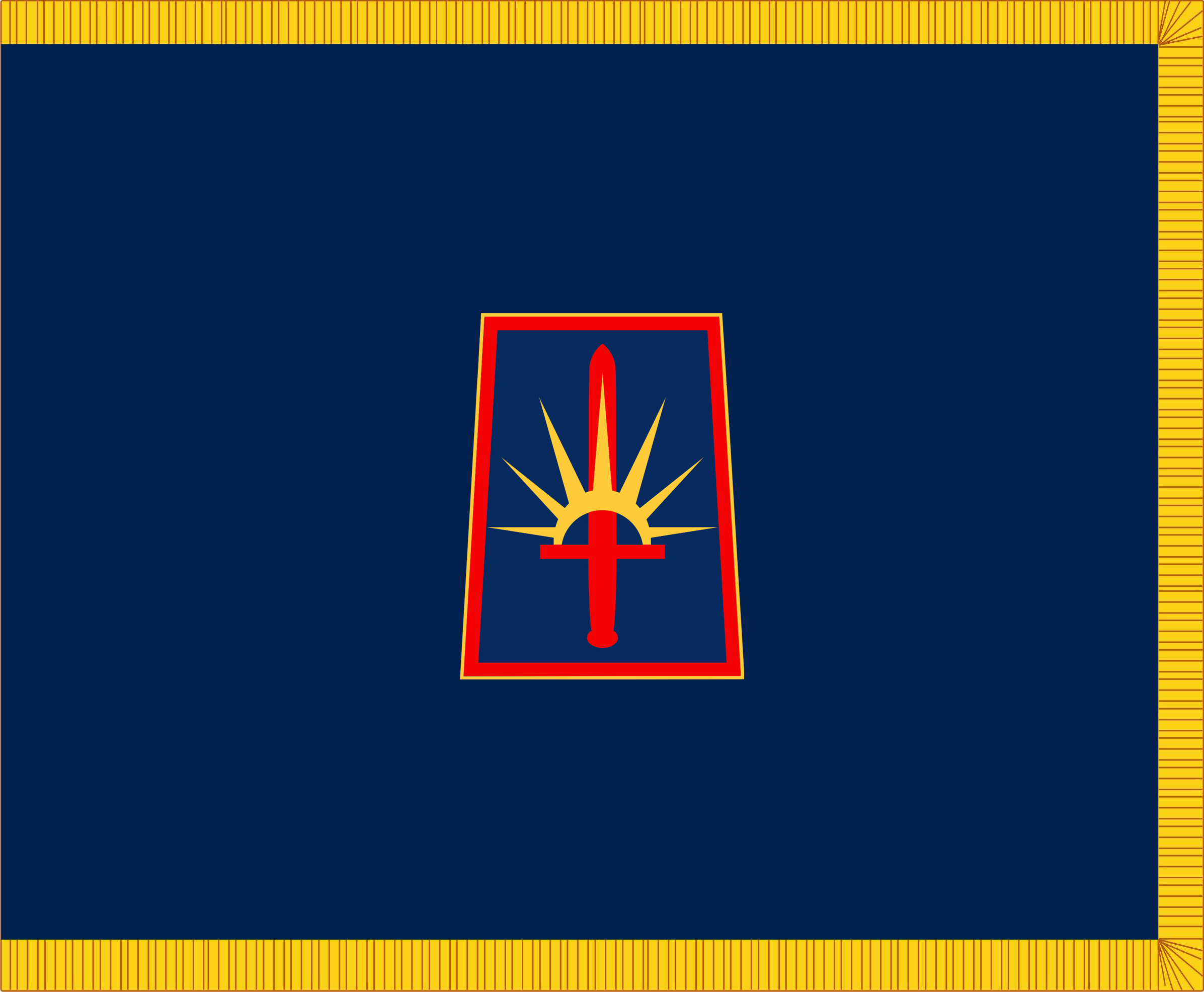
- New York Army National Guard Headquarters Flag

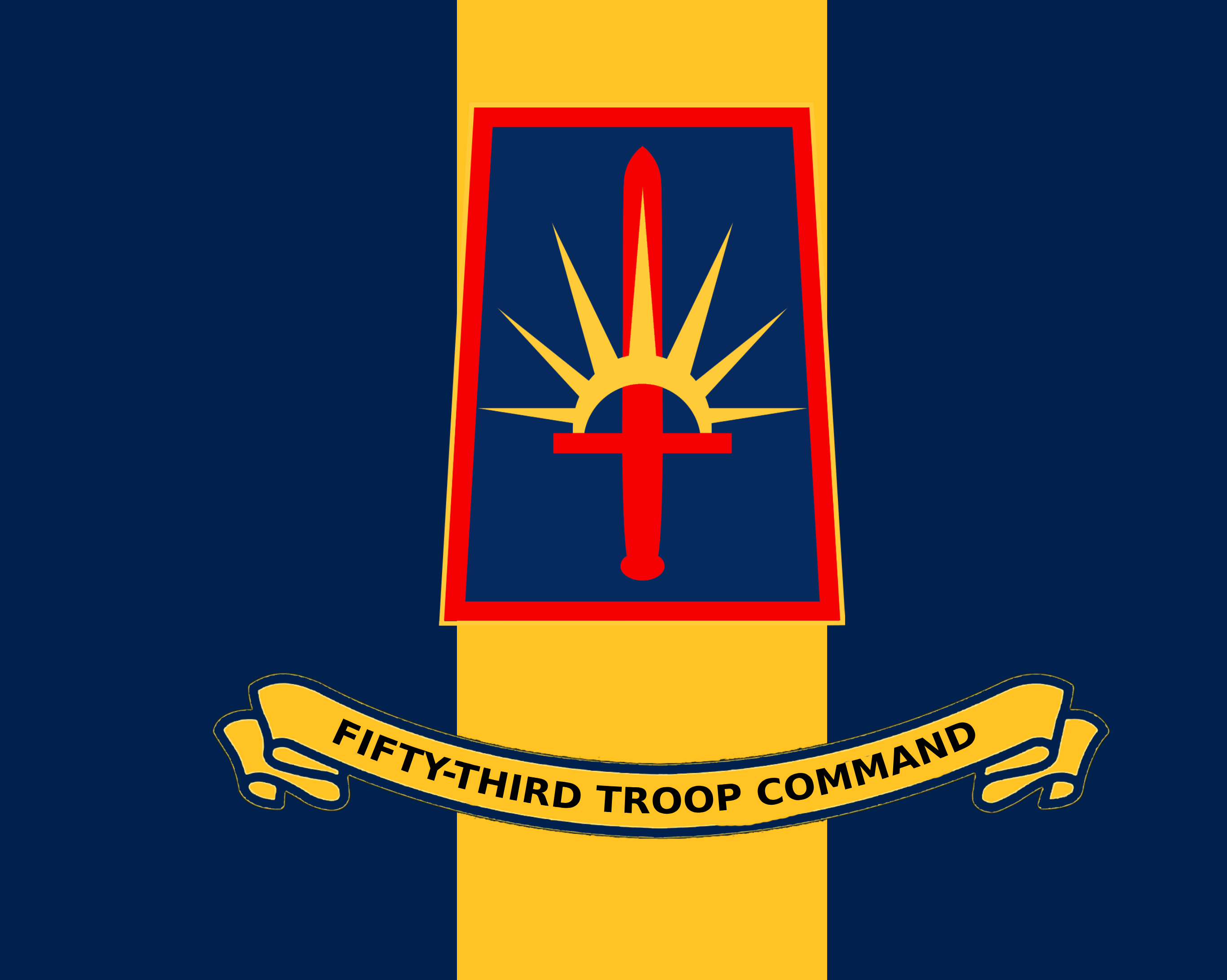
- New York Army National Guard 53rd Troop Command Flag

The New York Army National Guard is a component of the New York National Guard and the Army National Guard. Nationwide, the Army National Guard comprises approximately one half of the United States Army's available combat forces and approximately one third of its support organization. National coordination of various state National Guard units are maintained through the National Guard Bureau.

The New York Army National Guard maintains 57 armories, 21 Field and Combined Support Maintenance facilities, and three Army Aviation Support Facilities. New York Army National Guard units are trained and equipped as part of the United States Army. The same ranks and insignia are used and National Guardsmen are eligible to receive all United States military awards. The New York Guard also bestows a number of state awards for local services rendered in or to the state of New York.

The New York Army National Guard is a division of the Army National Guard, and although they are under control of the state, they can be federalized (as all Army National Guard units can), and will remain aligned with the federal government over the state government if requirements of the two conflict.

== History ==
During the American Revolution, New York City was occupied by the British 1775-1783; many of the Military companies existing prior to the war were broken up and enlisting in the Continental service. In 1786 the Militia was reestablished; the regiments in New York City were:

- Isaac Stoundenberg's 1st Regiment.
- Morris Lewis's 2nd Regiment.
- Aaron Burr's 3rd Regiment.
- Richard Varick's 4th Regiment
- Sebastian Bauman's New York City Regiment of Artillery.

=== American Civil War ===
Before the formal creation of the New York Army National Guard, the State of New York mobilized a number of militia regiments for short terms of service in the Union Army during moments of crisis in the American Civil War.

The militia regiments that New York mobilized included:

- 2nd Regiment New York State State Militia Infantry mustered into volunteer service as the 82nd New York Volunteer Infantry Regiment.

New York National Guard Infantry
- Active: 1861 to 1865
- Country: United States
- Allegiance: Union
- Branch: Infantry

- 4th Regiment National Guard Infantry was raised on June 18, 1863, for 30 days service in response to Robert E. Lee's invasion of Pennsylvania in June of that year. It served in Pennsylvania and was mustered out of service on July 24, 1863.
- 5th Regiment National Guard Infantry was raised on June 18, 1863, for 30 days service in response to Robert E. Lee's invasion of Pennsylvania in June of that year. It served in Pennsylvania and was mustered out of service on July 22, 1863.
- 6th Regiment National Guard Infantry was raised on June 18, 1863, for 30 days service in response to Robert E. Lee's invasion of Pennsylvania in June of that year. It served in Baltimore, Maryland, as part of the garrison of that city, and was mustered out of service on July 22, 1863.
- 8th Regiment National Guard Infantry (formerly 8th Regiment, New York State Militia) was mustered in on May 29, 1862, for 90 days service. It served in the defenses of Washington, DC, as part of the garrison of that city, and was mustered out of service on September 9, 1862. It was called up for a second time in June, 1863, for 30 days service in response to Robert E. Lee's invasion of Pennsylvania in June of that year. It served in Harrisburg, Pennsylvania, as part of the garrison of that city and 1st Brigade, 1st Division, Dept. of the Susquehanna, and was mustered out of service on July 23, 1863.
- 22nd Regiment National Guard Infantry served May 28, 1862, to July 24, 1863
- 25th Regiment National Guard Infantry was raised on May 31, 1862, for three months service. It served in the garrison of Suffolk, Virginia, and was mustered out of service on September 8, 1862.
- 28th Regiment National Guard Infantry was raised on June 20, 1863, in response to Robert E. Lee's invasion of Pennsylvania in June of that year. It saw no action during the campaign, and then returned to New York City to help suppress the draft riots there. It was mustered out on July 23, 1863. It was called up for a second time on September 2, 1864, for 100 days service and mustered out on November 13, 1864.
- 37th Regiment National Guard Infantry was raised on May 29, 1862, for three months service. It served in the Middle Department and was mustered out on September 2, 1862. It was mustered a second time for 30 days service during the Gettysburg campaign on June 18, 1863, and mustered out on July 22, 1863. The 37th was mustered a third time for 30 days on May 6, 1864, for guard duty at New York's harbor. It mustered out June 6, 1864.

The New York State Militia was active by the mid-1880s. In 1889 a group of wealthy equestrian enthusiasts were incorporated into the State Militia as Squadron A. Their heritage is carried on today by the 101st Cavalry Regiment.

=== New York Army National Guard ===
The Militia Act of 1903 organized the various state militias into the present National Guard system. The New York Army National Guard was formally created in 1906.

The New York Army National Guard dispatched elements of the 27th Infantry Division and the 42nd Infantry Division to both world wars. Douglas MacArthur served as an officer and brigade commander in the 42nd Infantry Division during the First World War. The 187th Field Artillery Group went ashore in the Normandy landings of June 1944 with the assault wave.

In 1959, the 212th Coast Artillery, which had previously been formed and serving with the NY ARNG, was reformed as the 212th Artillery. In the early 1960s, the NY ARNG included the 102nd Artillery Brigade (Air Defense), part of Army Air Defense Command, which in 1962 comprised 1-245, 2-209, 1-244, and 1-212th Artillery, equipped with a variety of missile systems.

For much of the final decades of the twentieth century, National Guard personnel typically served "One weekend a month, two weeks a year", with a portion working for the Guard in a full-time capacity.

In 1993, the 1st Battalion, 107th Infantry Regiment, was deactivated as part of nationwide force structure reductions. The 107th designation was reassigned to the former 205th Support Group, New York Army National Guard, creating the 107th Support Group.

=== Twenty-first century ===
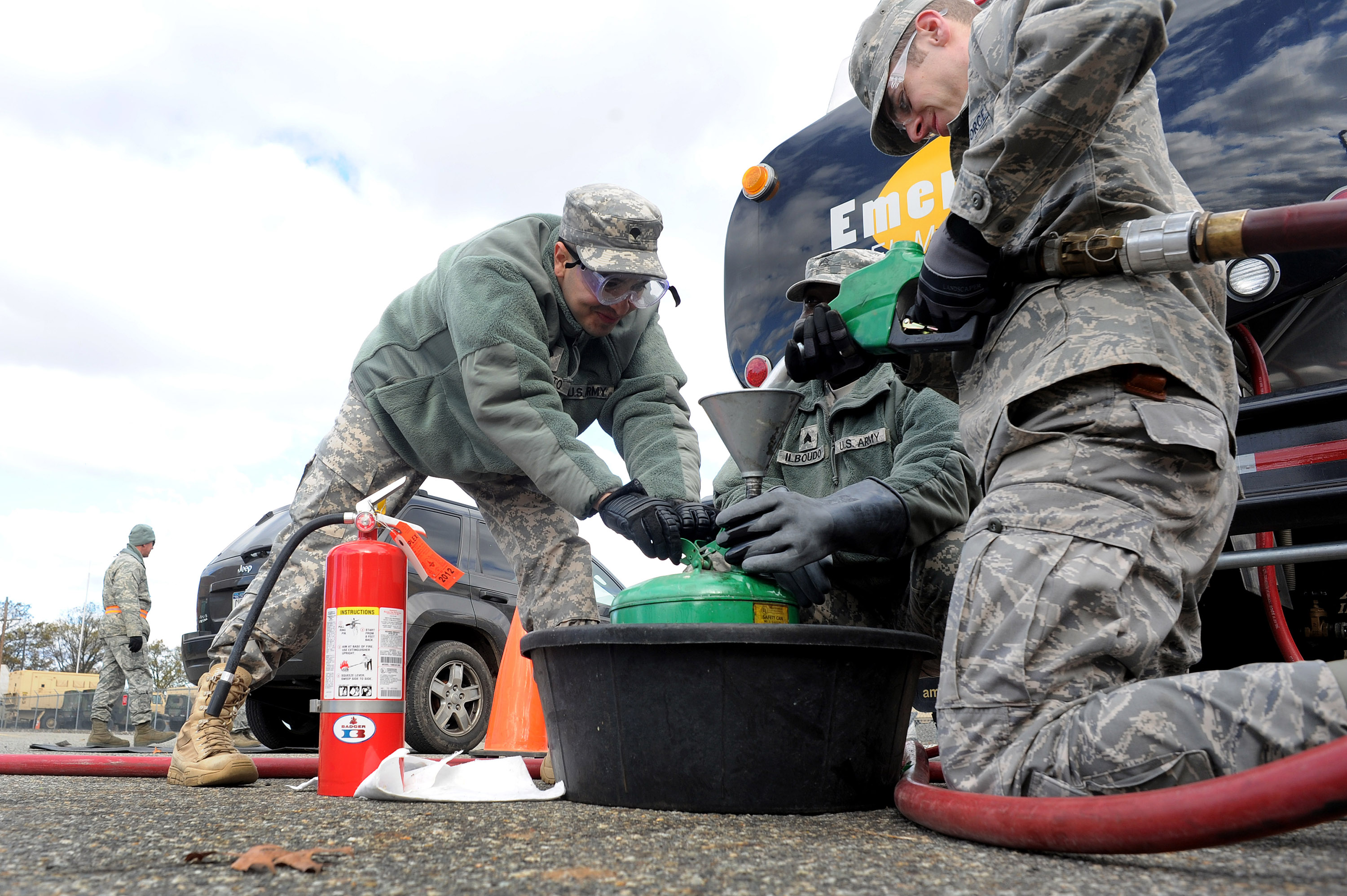
New York Army National Guardsmen distributing fuel at the Staten Island Armory to those in the local area affected by Hurricane Sandy

Since the 9/11 Attacks on New York City, New York Army National Guard Soldiers were brought back into force in 2003 to help in the "Ice Storm". Soon after that, they were deployed to Iraq and Afghanistan in support of the Global War on Terror, as well as faced an increase in domestic missions.

In the early 2000s, plans called for the typical National Guard unit (or National Guardsman) to serve one year of active duty for every three years of service. United States Department of Defense policy was that no Guardsman will be involuntarily activated for a total of more than 24 months (cumulative) in one six-year enlistment period. This policy was due to change on 1 August 2007; the new policy stated that soldiers will be given 24 months between deployments of no more than 24 months. However, individual states have differing policies.

The 2nd Battalion, 108th Infantry Regiment deployed to Iraq in 2004 along with the 105th MP Company. In 2004/2005 the 1st Battalion, 69th Infantry, along with Delta Company 1st Battalion, 101st Cavalry, served in Iraq; eventually assuming responsibility for security on the Baghdad International Airport Road.

In 2004 the Division Headquarters and division base units of the 42nd Infantry Division, the "Rainbow" Division, were mobilized for service in Iraq. The 42nd Infantry Division, took over responsibility for the area known as Multi-National Division North Central—the provinces of Salah Ah Din, Diyala, At Tamamim (or Kirkuk Province) and As Sulymaniah Province from the 1st Infantry Division on February 14, 2005. The 42nd Combat Aviation Brigade also deployed to Iraq during this period.

At one point during 2005 almost 3,500 members of the New York Army National Guard were serving in Iraq. Task Force Liberty, led by the 42nd Infantry Division, comprised 23,000 Soldiers including two Active Duty Army Brigades of the 3rd Infantry Division, the 278th Regimental Combat Team of the Tennessee Army National Guard, and the 116th Cavalry Brigade Combat Team from the Pacific Northwest.

About 25 NY ARNG soldiers deployed to Iraq in Sep 2006 as part of the 36th Combat Aviation Brigade.

In 2008 the 27th Brigade Combat Team was mobilized with the role of training Afghan National Army and Police forces in Afghanistan (Task Force Phoenix). The 2nd Squadron, 101st Cavalry deployed with the 27th BCT. Members of the 2nd Battalion, 108th Infantry, and 1st Battalion 69th Infantry, filled out vacancies in the deploying units. The brigade returned late 2008.

The 3rd Battalion, 142nd Aviation (Assault Helicopter) deployed to Iraq in late summer of 2008 in support of Multi-National Corps – Iraq, as did the 133rd Quartermaster Company. The battalion returned to New York in the spring of 2009.

The 27th Brigade Combat Team received a notification of sourcing and deployed to Afghanistan in February 2012. The various units within the 27th BCT were assigned various missions throughout Afghanistan, Kuwait, and Bahrain.

The HHD/107th Support Group has recently been reorganized and redesignated several times and is now the 53rd Army Digital Liaison Team.

=== Organization ===
As of February 2026 the New York Army National Guard consists of the following units:

- Joint Force Headquarters-New York, Army Element, at Albany Airport
  - Headquarters and Headquarters Detachment, Joint Force Headquarters-New York, Army Element, at Albany Airport
  - New York Recruiting & Retention Battalion, at Watervliet Arsenal
    - Company A, New York Recruiting & Retention Battalion, in Manhattan
      - Detachment 1, Company A, New York Recruiting & Retention Battalion, in Farmingdale
      - Detachment 2, Company A, New York Recruiting & Retention Battalion, at Fort Hamilton
      - Detachment 3, Company A, New York Recruiting & Retention Battalion, in Jamaica
    - Company B, New York Recruiting & Retention Battalion, in Troy
      - Detachment 1, Company B, New York Recruiting & Retention Battalion, in Queensbury
      - Detachment 2, Company B, New York Recruiting & Retention Battalion, in Leeds
    - Company C, New York Recruiting & Retention Battalion, in Syracuse
      - Detachment 1, Company C, New York Recruiting & Retention Battalion, in Buffalo
      - Detachment 2, Company C, New York Recruiting & Retention Battalion, in Rochester
      - Detachment 3, Company C, New York Recruiting & Retention Battalion, in Auburn
  - New York Medical Detachment, at Watervliet Arsenal
  - 1025th Judge Advocate General Detachment, at Albany Airport
  - 1076th Judge Advocate General Detachment, at Albany Airport
  - Camp Smith Training Site, in Cortlandt Manor
  - Army Aviation Support Facility #1, at Long Island MacArthur Airport
  - Army Aviation Support Facility #2, at Greater Rochester Airport
  - Army Aviation Support Facility #3, at Albany Airport
  - State Army Aviation Office, at Albany Airport
    - Detachment 5, Company C, 2nd Battalion (Fixed Wing), 245th Aviation Regiment (Detachment 20, Operational Support Airlift Activity), at Albany Airport (C-12 Huron)
  - Combined Support Maintenance Shop #1, at Camp Smith
  - Combined Support Maintenance Shop #2, in Staten Island
  - Combined Support Maintenance Shop #3, in Henrietta
  - Maneuver Area Training Equipment Site #1, at Fort Drum
  - Field Maintenance Shop #1, in Buffalo
  - Field Maintenance Shop #2, in Jamestown
  - Field Maintenance Shop #3, in Geneseo
  - Field Maintenance Shop #4, in Auburn
  - Field Maintenance Shop #5, in Syracuse
  - Field Maintenance Shop #6, in Utica
  - Field Maintenance Shop #7, in Kingston
  - Field Maintenance Shop #9, in Jamaica
  - Field Maintenance Shop #11, in Rochester
  - Field Maintenance Shop #12, at Watervliet Arsenal
  - Field Maintenance Shop #13, in Binghamton
  - Field Maintenance Shop #14, in Farmingdale
  - Field Maintenance Shop #11, in Queensbury
  - Field Maintenance Shop #17, in Troy
  - Field Maintenance Shop #19, at Albany Airport
  - 42nd Infantry Division, in Troy
    - Headquarters and Headquarters Battalion, 42nd Infantry Division, in Troy
      - Headquarters Support Company, 42nd Infantry Division, in Troy
        - Detachment 1, Headquarters Support Company, 42nd Infantry Division, in Staten Island
      - Company A (Operations), Headquarters and Headquarters Battalion, 42nd Infantry Division, in Troy
        - Detachment 1, Company A (Operations), Headquarters and Headquarters Battalion, 42nd Infantry Division, in Staten Island
      - Company B (Intelligence and Sustainment), Headquarters and Headquarters Battalion, 42nd Infantry Division, in Glenville
        - Detachment 1, Company B (Intelligence and Sustainment), Headquarters and Headquarters Battalion, 42nd Infantry Division, in Staten Island
      - Company C (Signal), Headquarters and Headquarters Battalion, 42nd Infantry Division, in Staten Island
        - Detachment 1, Company C (Signal), Headquarters and Headquarters Battalion, 42nd Infantry Division, in Troy
      - 42nd Infantry Division Band, at Camp Smith
      - 10th Mountain Division Main Command Post-Operational Detachment, in Syracuse
    - 27th Infantry Brigade Combat Team, in Syracuse
      - Headquarters and Headquarters Company, 27th Infantry Brigade Combat Team, in Syracuse
      - 2nd Squadron, 101st Cavalry Regiment, in Niagara Falls
        - Headquarters and Headquarters Troop, 2nd Squadron, 101st Cavalry Regiment, in Niagara Falls
        - Troop A, 2nd Squadron, 101st Cavalry Regiment, in Geneva
        - Troop B, 2nd Squadron, 101st Cavalry Regiment, in Jamestown
          - Detachment 1, Troop B, 2nd Squadron, 101st Cavalry Regiment, in Buffalo
        - Troop C (Dismounted), 2nd Squadron, 101st Cavalry Regiment, in Buffalo
      - 1st Battalion, 69th Infantry Regiment, in Manhattan
        - Headquarters and Headquarters Company, 1st Battalion, 69th Infantry Regiment, in Manhattan
        - Company A, 1st Battalion, 69th Infantry Regiment, in Harlem
        - Company B, 1st Battalion, 69th Infantry Regiment, in Farmingdale
        - Company C, 1st Battalion, 69th Infantry Regiment, in Harlem
          - Detachment 1, Company C, 1st Battalion, 69th Infantry Regiment, in Manhattan
        - Company D (Weapons), 1st Battalion, 69th Infantry Regiment, in Farmingdale
      - 2nd Battalion, 108th Infantry Regiment, in Utica
        - Headquarters and Headquarters Company, 2nd Battalion, 108th Infantry Regiment, in Utica
        - Company A, 2nd Battalion, 108th Infantry Regiment, in Geneseo
          - Detachment 1, Company A, 2nd Battalion, 108th Infantry Regiment, in Morrisonville
        - Company B, 2nd Battalion, 108th Infantry Regiment, at Camp Smith
        - Company C, 2nd Battalion, 108th Infantry Regiment, in Gloversville
          - Detachment 1, Company C, 2nd Battalion, 108th Infantry Regiment, in Leeds
        - Company D (Weapons), 2nd Battalion, 108th Infantry Regiment, in Ithaca
      - 1st Battalion, 182nd Infantry Regiment, in Melrose (MA) — (Massachusetts Army National Guard)
      - 1st Battalion, 258th Field Artillery Regiment, in Jamaica
        - Headquarters and Headquarters Battery, 1st Battalion, 258th Field Artillery Regiment, in Jamaica
          - Detachment 1, Headquarters and Headquarters Battery, 1st Battalion, 258th Field Artillery Regiment, in Peekskill
        - Battery A, 1st Battalion, 258th Field Artillery Regiment, in New Windsor
        - Battery B, 1st Battalion, 258th Field Artillery Regiment, at Camp Smith
        - Battery C, 1st Battalion, 258th Field Artillery Regiment, at Camp Smith
      - 152nd Brigade Engineer Battalion, in Buffalo
        - Headquarters and Headquarters Company, 152nd Brigade Engineer Battalion, in Buffalo
        - Company A (Combat Engineer), 152nd Brigade Engineer Battalion, in Manhattan
        - Company B (Combat Engineer), 152nd Brigade Engineer Battalion, in Lockport
        - Company C (Signal), 152nd Brigade Engineer Battalion, in Buffalo
        - Company D (Military Intelligence), 152nd Brigade Engineer Battalion, in Syracuse
          - Detachment 1, Company D (Military Intelligence), 152nd Brigade Engineer Battalion, at Greater Rochester Airport (RQ-28A UAV)
      - 427th Brigade Support Battalion, in Syracuse
        - Headquarters and Headquarters Company, 427th Brigade Support Battalion, in Syracuse
        - Company A (Distribution), 427th Brigade Support Battalion, in Rochester
        - Company B (Maintenance), 427th Brigade Support Battalion, at Fort Drum
        - Company C (Medical), 427th Brigade Support Battalion, in Buffalo
        - Company D (Forward Support), 427th Brigade Support Battalion, in Buffalo — attached to 2nd Squadron, 101st Cavalry Regiment
        - Company E (Forward Support), 427th Brigade Support Battalion, in Buffalo — attached to 152nd Brigade Engineer Battalion
        - Company F (Forward Support), 427th Brigade Support Battalion, in Jamaica — attached to 1st Battalion, 258th Field Artillery Regiment
        - Company G (Forward Support), 427th Brigade Support Battalion, in Glenville — attached to 2nd Battalion, 108th Infantry Regiment
        - Company H (Forward Support), 427th Brigade Support Battalion, in Farmingdale — attached to 1st Battalion, 69th Infantry Regiment
        - Company I (Forward Support), 427th Brigade Support Battalion, in Dorchester (MA) — attached to 1st Battalion, 182nd Infantry Regiment (Massachusetts Army National Guard)
    - 44th Infantry Brigade Combat Team, in Lawrenceville (NJ) — (New Jersey Army National Guard)
    - 86th Infantry Brigade Combat Team (Mountain), at Ethan Allen Firing Range (VT) — (Vermont Army National Guard)
    - 42nd Division Artillery, in Jamaica
      - Headquarters and Headquarters Battery, 42nd Division Artillery, in Jamaica
    - 42nd Combat Aviation Brigade, at Albany Airport
      - Headquarters and Headquarters Company, 42nd Combat Aviation Brigade, at Albany Airport
      - 3rd Battalion (General Support Aviation), 126th Aviation Regiment, at Joint Base Cape Cod (MA) — (Massachusetts Army National Guard)
        - Detachment 1, Company B (Heavy Lift), 3rd Battalion (General Support Aviation), 126th Aviation Regiment, at Greater Rochester Airport (CH-47F Chinook)
          - Detachment 2, Headquarters and Headquarters Company, 3rd Battalion (General Support Aviation), 126th Aviation Regiment, at Greater Rochester Airport
          - Detachment 2, Company D (AVUM), 3rd Battalion (General Support Aviation), 126th Aviation Regiment, at Greater Rochester Airport
          - Detachment 2, Company E (Forward Support), 3rd Battalion (General Support Aviation), 126th Aviation Regiment, at Greater Rochester Airport
      - 3rd Battalion (Assault), 142nd Aviation Regiment, at Long Island MacArthur Airport
        - Headquarters and Headquarters Company, 3rd Battalion (Assault), 142nd Aviation Regiment, at Long Island MacArthur Airport
          - Detachment 1, Headquarters and Headquarters Company, 3rd Battalion (Assault), 142nd Aviation Regiment, at Bradley Airport (CT) — (Connecticut Army National Guard)
          - Detachment 2, Headquarters and Headquarters Company, 3rd Battalion (Assault), 142nd Aviation Regiment, at Bangor Air National Guard Base (ME) — (Maine Army National Guard)
        - Company A, 3rd Battalion (Assault), 142nd Aviation Regiment, at Albany Airport (UH-60M Black Hawk)
        - Company B, 3rd Battalion (Assault), 142nd Aviation Regiment, at Long Island MacArthur Airport (UH-60M Black Hawk)
        - Company C, 3rd Battalion (Assault), 142nd Aviation Regiment, at Bradley Airport (CT) (UH-60M Black Hawk) — (Connecticut Army National Guard)
          - Detachment 1, Company C, 3rd Battalion (Assault), 142nd Aviation Regiment, at Bangor Air National Guard Base (ME) — (Maine Army National Guard)
        - Company D (AVUM), 3rd Battalion (Assault), 142nd Aviation Regiment, at Albany Airport
          - Detachment 1, Company D (AVUM), 3rd Battalion (Assault), 142nd Aviation Regiment, at Bradley Airport (CT) — (Connecticut Army National Guard)
          - Detachment 2, Company D (AVUM), 3rd Battalion (Assault), 142nd Aviation Regiment, at Bangor Air National Guard Base (ME) — (Maine Army National Guard)
        - Company E (Forward Support), 3rd Battalion (Assault), 142nd Aviation Regiment, in Farmingdale
          - Detachment 1, Company E (Forward Support), 3rd Battalion (Assault), 142nd Aviation Regiment, at Bradley Airport (CT) — (Connecticut Army National Guard)
          - Detachment 2, Company E (Forward Support), 3rd Battalion (Assault), 142nd Aviation Regiment, at Bangor Air National Guard Base (ME) — (Maine Army National Guard)
          - Detachment 3, Company E (Forward Support), 3rd Battalion (Assault), 142nd Aviation Regiment, at Albany Airport
      - 1st Battalion (Security & Support), 224th Aviation Regiment, at Weide Army Airfield (MD) — (Maryland Army National Guard)
        - Detachment 2, Company B, 1st Battalion (Security & Support), 224th Aviation Regiment, at Albany Airport (UH-60M Black Hawk)
      - 642nd Aviation Support Battalion, at Greater Rochester Airport
        - Headquarters Support Company, 642nd Aviation Support Battalion, at Greater Rochester Airport
        - Company A (Distribution), 642nd Aviation Support Battalion, in Dunkirk
          - Detachment 1, Company A (Distribution), 642nd Aviation Support Battalion, in Olean
        - Company B (AVIM), 642nd Aviation Support Battalion, at Long Island MacArthur Airport
          - Detachment 1, Company B (AVIM), 642nd Aviation Support Battalion, at McEntire Joint National Guard Base (SC) — (South Carolina Army National Guard)
          - Detachment 2, Company B (AVIM), 642nd Aviation Support Battalion, at Weide Army Airfield (MD) — (Maryland Army National Guard)
        - Company C (Signal), 642nd Aviation Support Battalion, at Fort Hamilton
        - Company C (MEDEVAC), 1st Battalion (General Support Aviation), 171st Aviation Regiment, at Greater Rochester Airport (HH-60L Black Hawk)
          - Detachment 2, Headquarters and Headquarters Company, 1st Battalion (General Support Aviation), 171st Aviation Regiment, at Greater Rochester Airport
          - Detachment 2, Company D (AVUM), 1st Battalion (General Support Aviation), 171st Aviation Regiment, at Greater Rochester Airport
          - Detachment 2, Company E (Forward Support), 1st Battalion (General Support Aviation), 171st Aviation Regiment, at Greater Rochester Airport
    - 42nd Division Sustainment Brigade, in Harlem
      - 42nd Division Sustainment Troops Battalion, in Harlem
        - Headquarters and Headquarters Company, 42nd Division Sustainment Brigade, in Harlem
        - 187th Signal Company, in Farmingdale
        - 1501st Quartermaster Company (Field Feeding), at Camp Smith
          - Detachment 1, 1501st Quartermaster Company (Field Feeding), in Troy
          - Detachment 2, 1501st Quartermaster Company (Field Feeding), in Rochester
        - 1569th Transportation Company (Medium Truck) (Cargo), in New Windsor
      - 27th Finance Battalion, in Whitestone
        - Headquarters and Headquarters Detachment, 27th Finance Battalion, in Whitestone
        - 4th Finance Company, in Whitestone
        - 7th Finance Company, in Whitestone
        - 14th Finance Company, in Whitestone
        - 37th Finance Company, in Whitestone
      - 119th Division Sustainment Support Battalion, in Vineland (NJ) — (New Jersey Army National Guard)
        - Headquarters & Headquarters Company, 119th Division Sustainment Support Battalion, in Vineland
        - Company A (Composite Supply Company), 119th Division Sustainment Support Battalion, in Staten Island
        - Company B (Support Maintenance Company), 119th Division Sustainment Support Battalion, in Staten Island
        - Company C (Composite Truck Company), 119th Division Sustainment Support Battalion, at Camp Smith
          - Detachment 1, Company C, 119th Division Sustainment Support Battalion, in Harlem
  - 53rd Troop Command, at Camp Smith
    - Headquarters and Headquarters Detachment, 53rd Troop Command, at Camp Smith
    - 2nd Civil Support Team (WMD), in Scotia
    - 24th Civil Support Team (WMD), at Fort Hamilton
    - 53rd Digital Liaison Detachment, in Manhattan
    - 138th Chaplain Detachment, at Camp Smith
    - 138th Public Affairs Detachment, at Camp Smith
    - Cyber Protection Team 173, at Camp Smith
    - 101st Expeditionary Signal Battalion, in Yonkers
      - Headquarters and Headquarters Company, 101st Expeditionary Signal Battalion, in Yonkers
      - Company A, 101st Expeditionary Signal Battalion, in Peekskill
      - Company B, 101st Expeditionary Signal Battalion, in Orangeburg
      - Company C, 101st Expeditionary Signal Battalion, in Yonkers
    - 104th Military Police Battalion, in Kingston
      - Headquarters and Headquarters Detachment, 104th Military Police Battalion, in Kingston
      - 107th Military Police Company (Combat Support), at Fort Hamilton
      - 222nd Chemical Company, at Fort Hamilton
      - 442nd Military Police Company (Combat Support), in Jamaica
      - 727th Military Police Detachment (Law Enforcement), Camp Smith
    - 153rd Troop Command, in Buffalo
      - Headquarters and Headquarters Detachment, 153rd Troop Command, in Buffalo
      - 272nd Military Police Detachment (Theater Detainee Reporting Center), in Auburn
      - 102nd Military Police Battalion, in Auburn
        - Headquarters and Headquarters Detachment, 102nd Military Police Battalion, in Auburn
        - 105th Military Police Company (Combat Support), in Buffalo
        - 206th Military Police Company (Combat Support), at Albany Airport
          - Detachment 1, 206th Military Police Company (Combat Support), in Utica
        - 222nd Military Police Company (Combat Support), in Rochester
          - Detachment 1, 222nd Military Police Company (Combat Support), in Hornell
      - 204th Engineer Battalion, in Binghamton
        - Headquarters and Headquarters Company, 204th Engineer Battalion, in Binghamton
        - Forward Support Company, 204th Engineer Battalion, in Binghamton
        - 152nd Engineer Company (Engineer Support Company), in Buffalo
        - 204th Engineer Platoon (Quarry), in Binghamton
        - 827th Engineer Company (Engineer Construction Company), in Horseheads
          - Detachment 1, 827th Engineer Company (Engineer Construction Company), in Walton
        - 1156th Engineer Company (Vertical Construction Company), at Camp Smith
          - Detachment 1, 1156th Engineer Company (Vertical Construction Company), in Kingston
      - 501st Ordnance Battalion (EOD), in Glenville
        - Headquarters and Headquarters Detachment, 501st Ordnance Battalion (EOD), in Glenville
        - 387th Ordnance Company (EOD), at Camp Edwards (MA) — (Massachusetts Army National Guard)
        - 430th Ordnance Company (EOD), in Washington (NC) — (North Carolina Army National Guard)
        - 466th Medical Company (Area Support), in Queensbury
        - 745th Ordnance Company (EOD), at Camp Grayling (MI) — (Michigan Army National Guard)
        - 753rd Ordnance Company (EOD), at Camp Dawson (WV) — (West Virginia Army National Guard)
        - 1108th Ordnance Company (EOD), in Glenville
        - 1427th Transportation Company (Medium Truck) (Cargo), in Queensbury
          - Detachment 1, 1427th Transportation Company (Medium Truck) (Cargo), at Fort Drum
  - 106th Regiment, Regional Training Institute, at Camp Smith
    - 1st Battalion (Infantry)
    - 2nd Battalion (Modular Training)

Aviation unit abbreviations: MEDEVAC — Medical evacuation; AVUM — Aviation Unit Maintenance; AVIM — Aviation Intermediate Maintenance

== Historic units ==
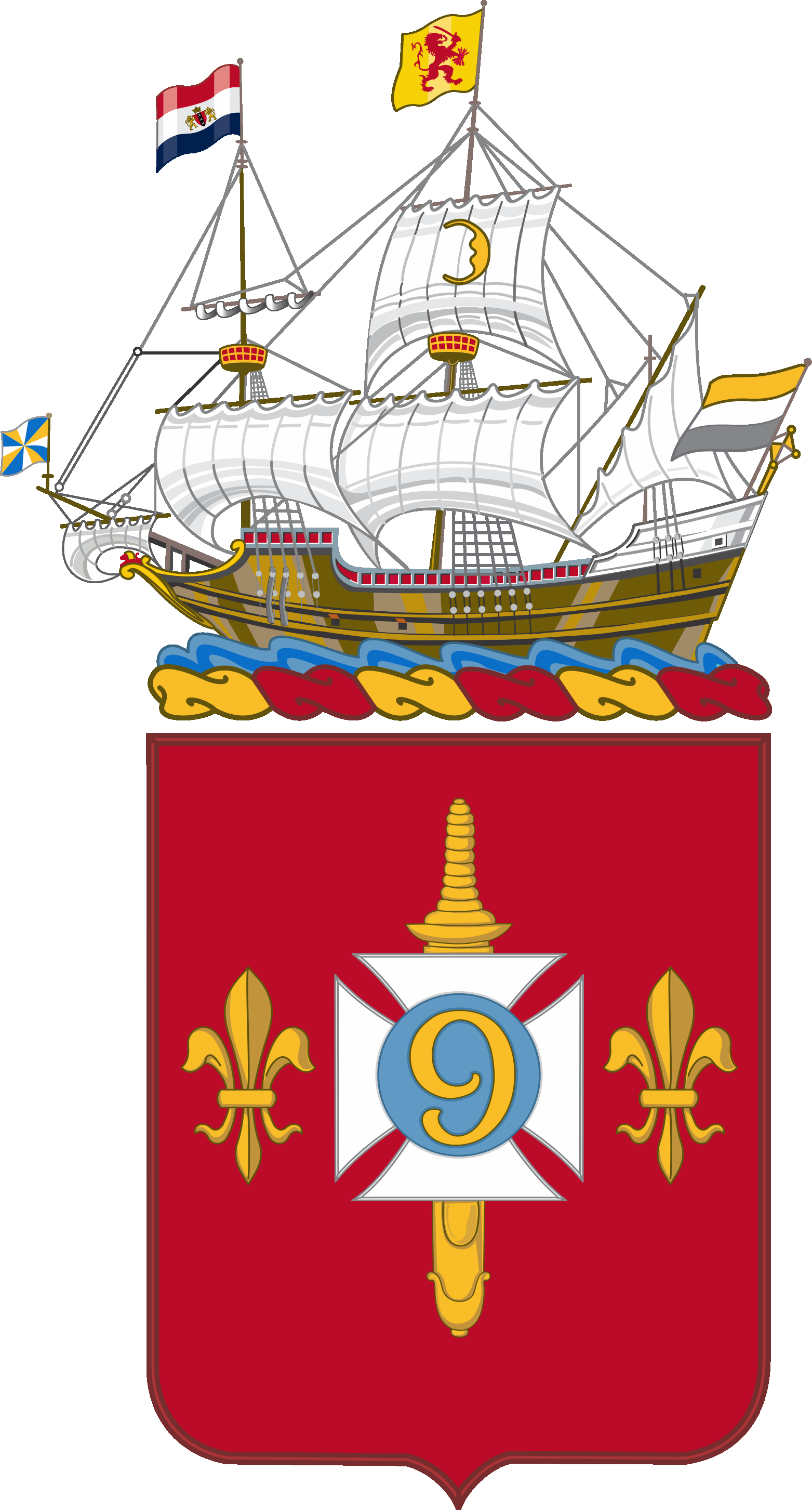
- 244th Air Defense Artillery Regiment
- 245th Coast Artillery Regiment
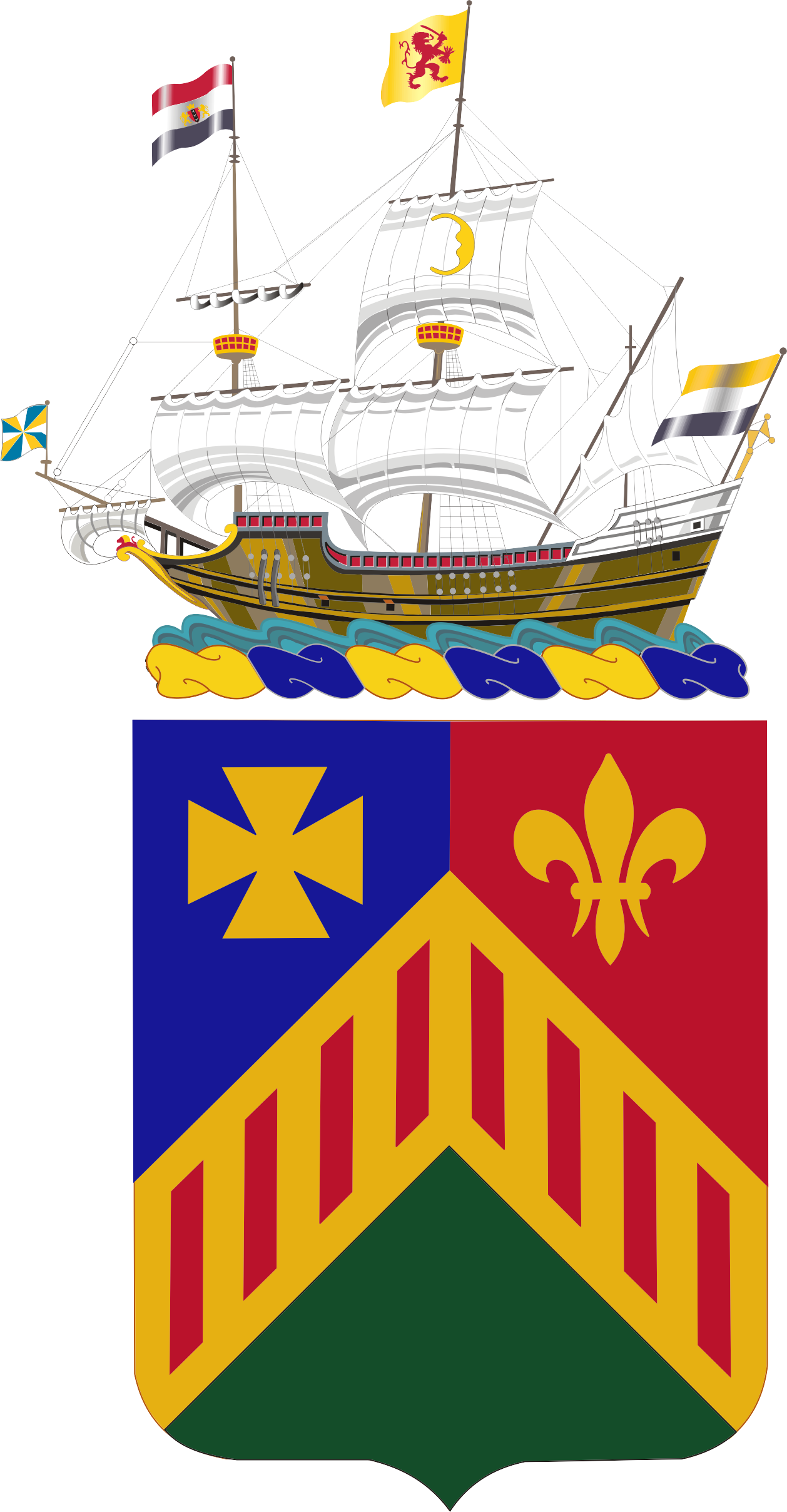
- 127th Armor Regiment
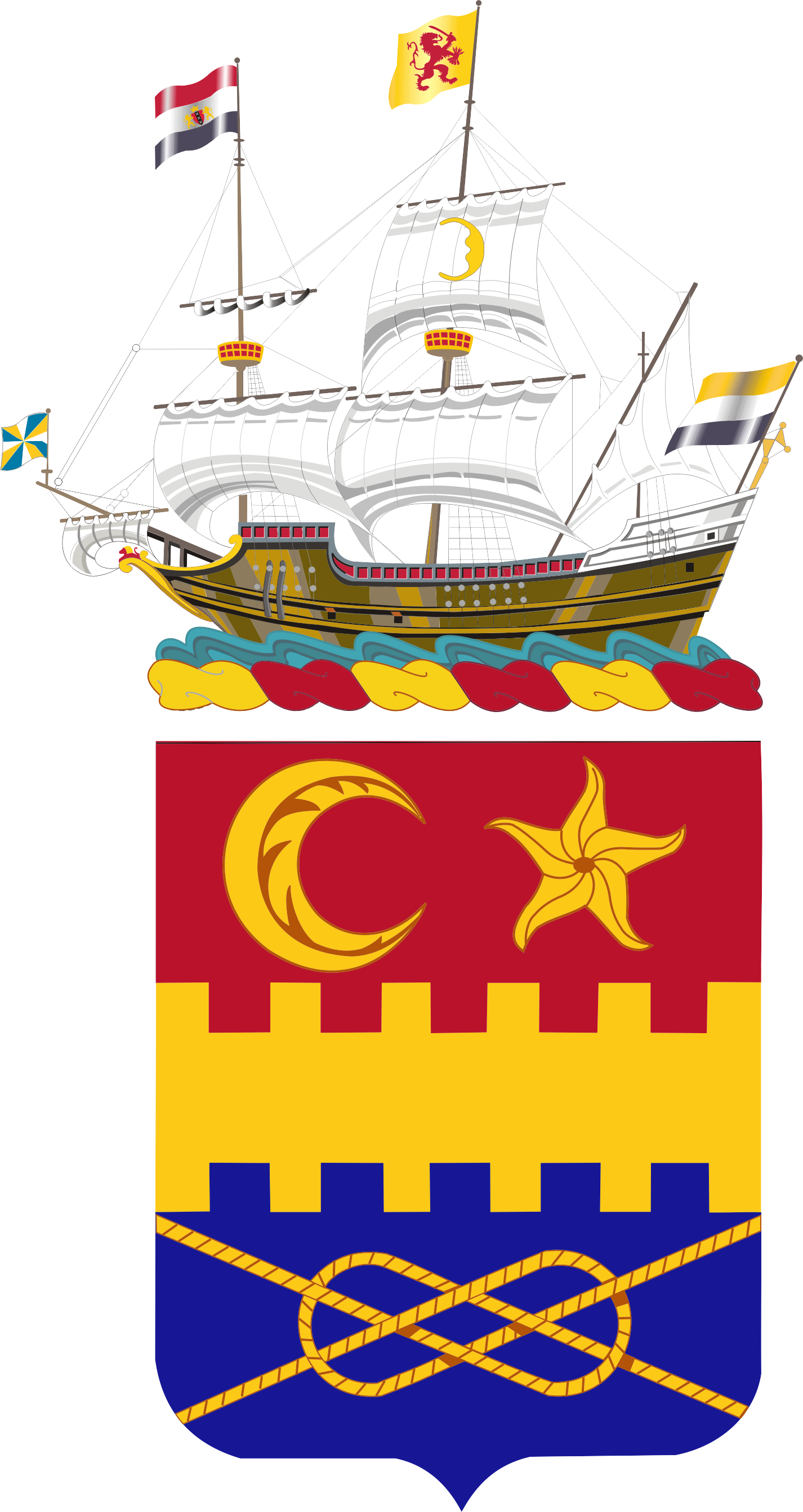
- 174th Armor Regiment
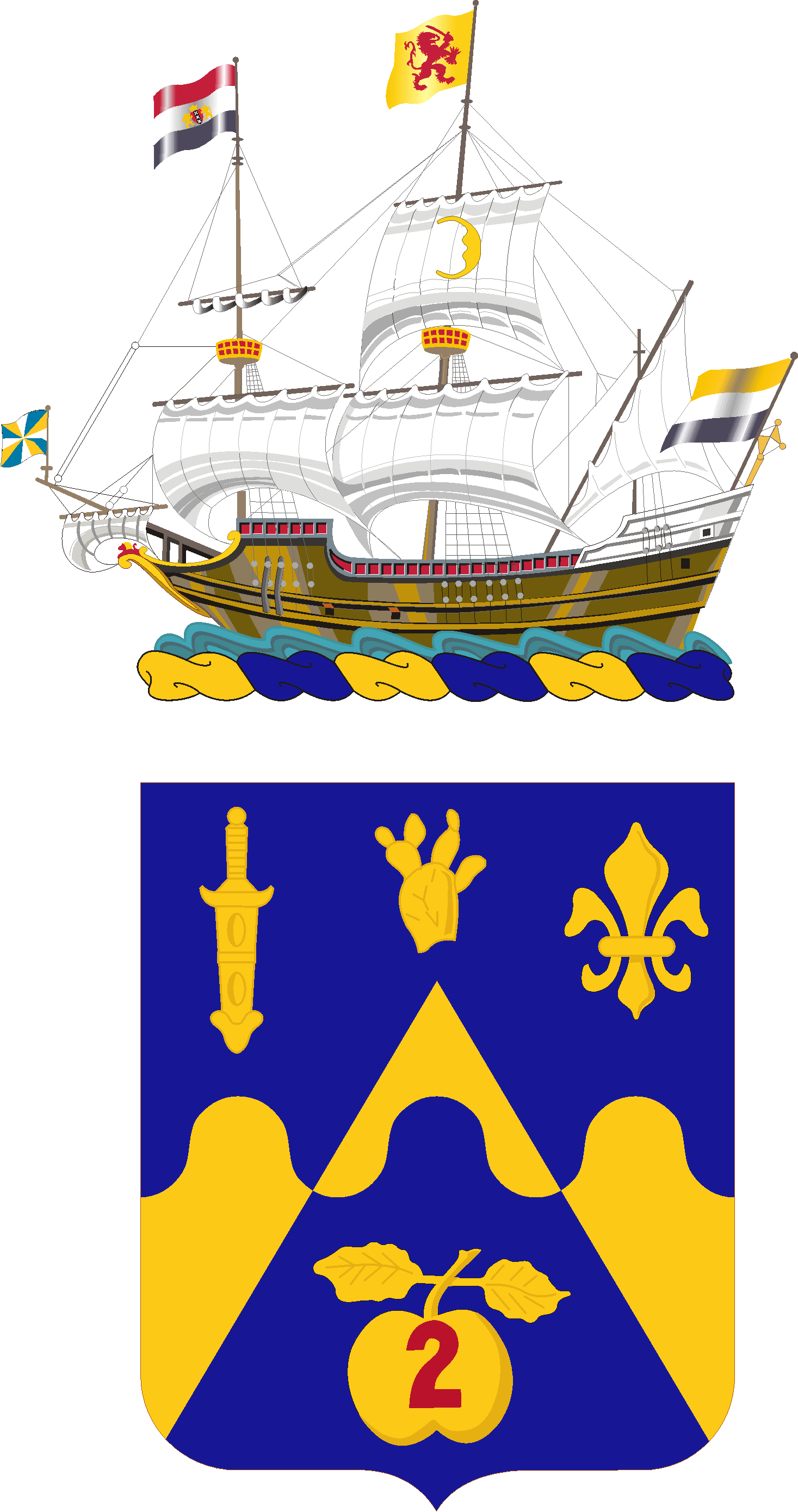
- 205th Armor Regiment
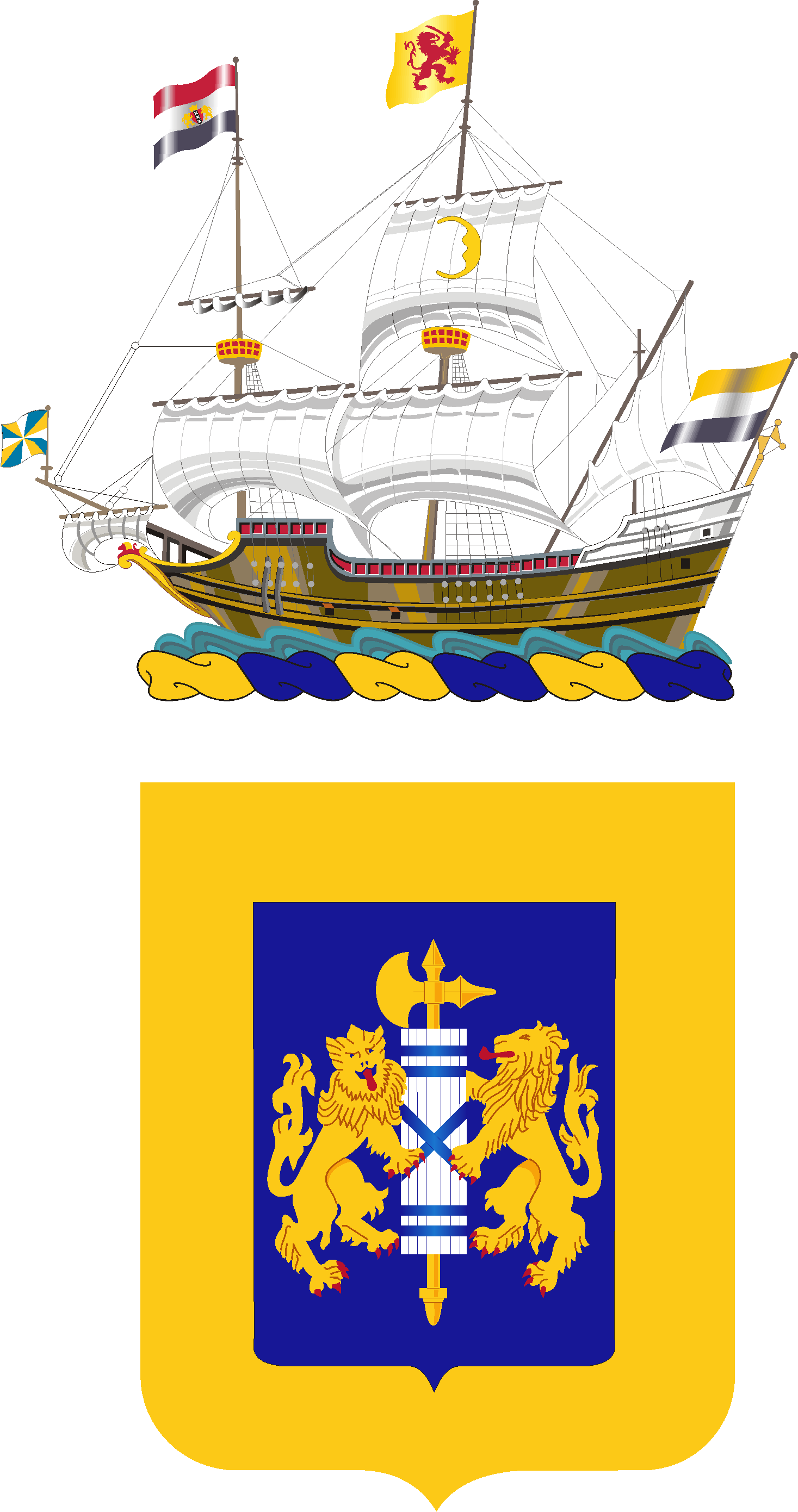
- 208th Armor Regiment
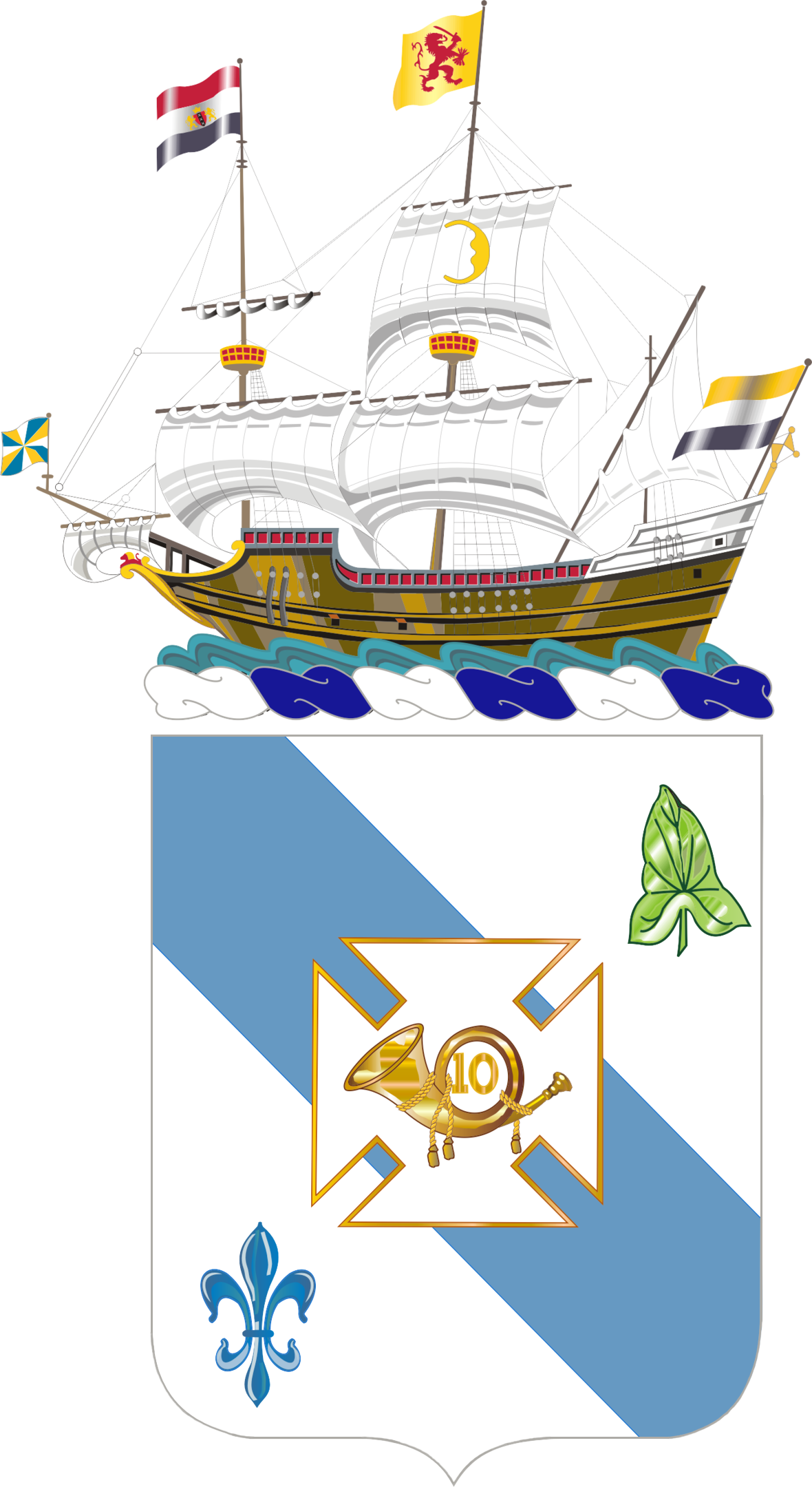
- 210th Armor Regiment
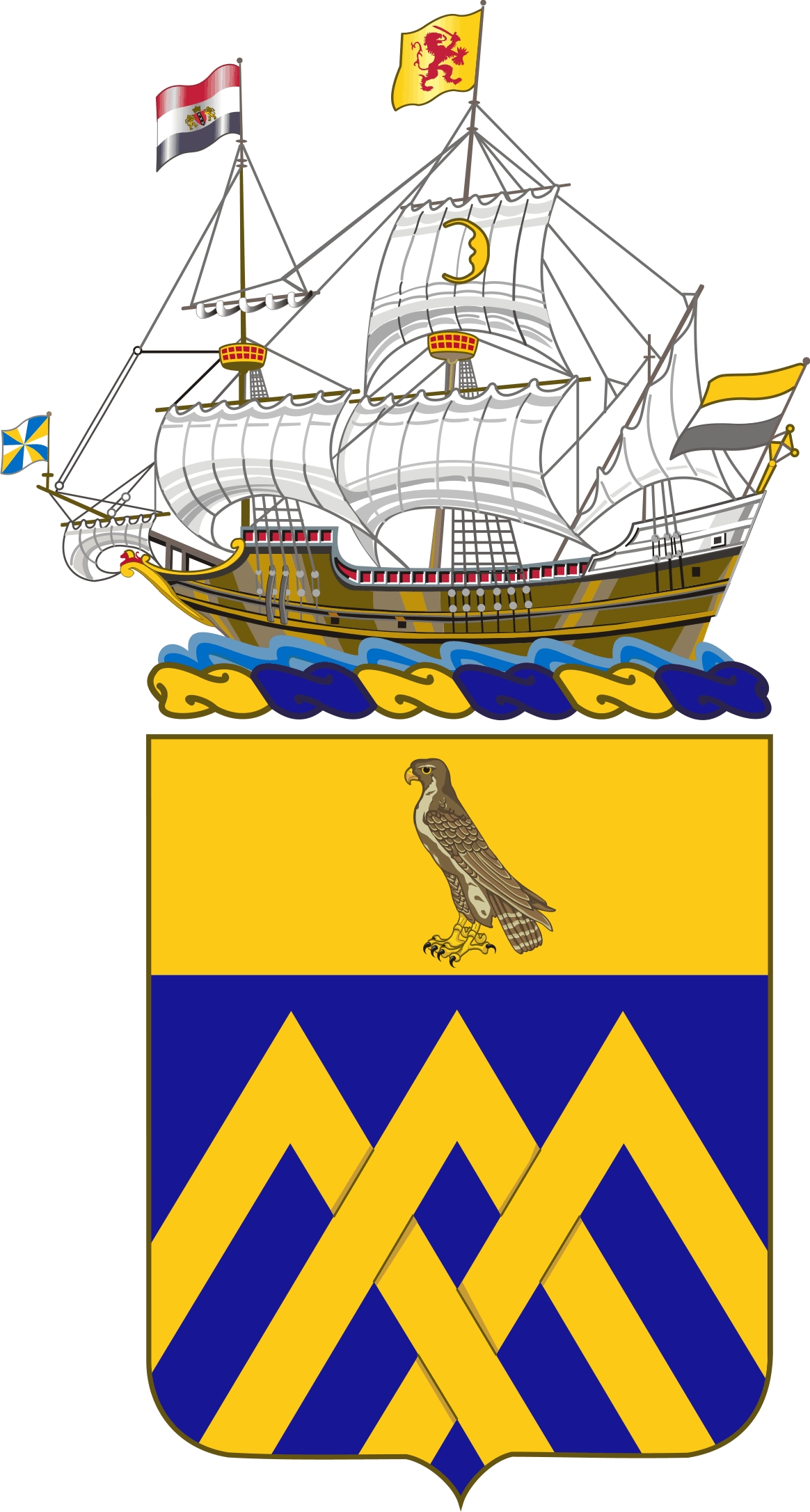
- 101st Cavalry Regiment
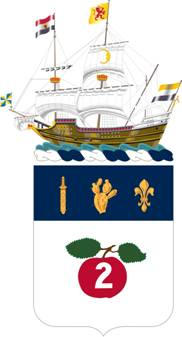
- 105th Infantry Regiment
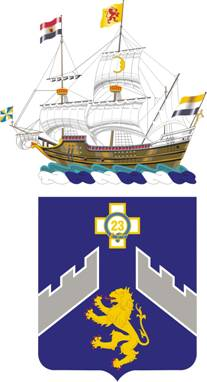
- 106th Infantry Regiment
- HHC/108th Support Group, one of only nineteen Army National Guard units with campaign credit for the War of 1812
- 93rd Infantry Brigade
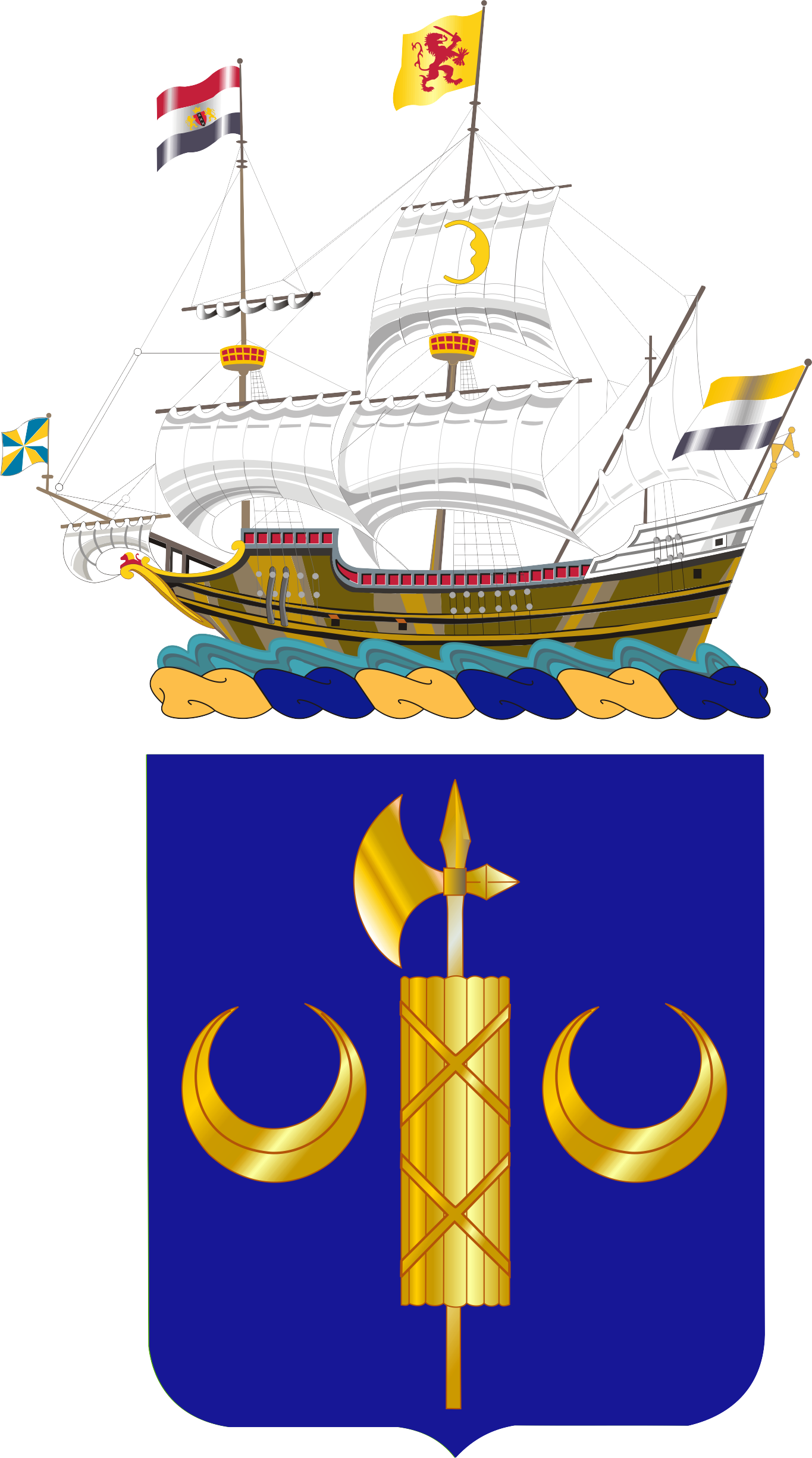
  - 71st Infantry Regiment
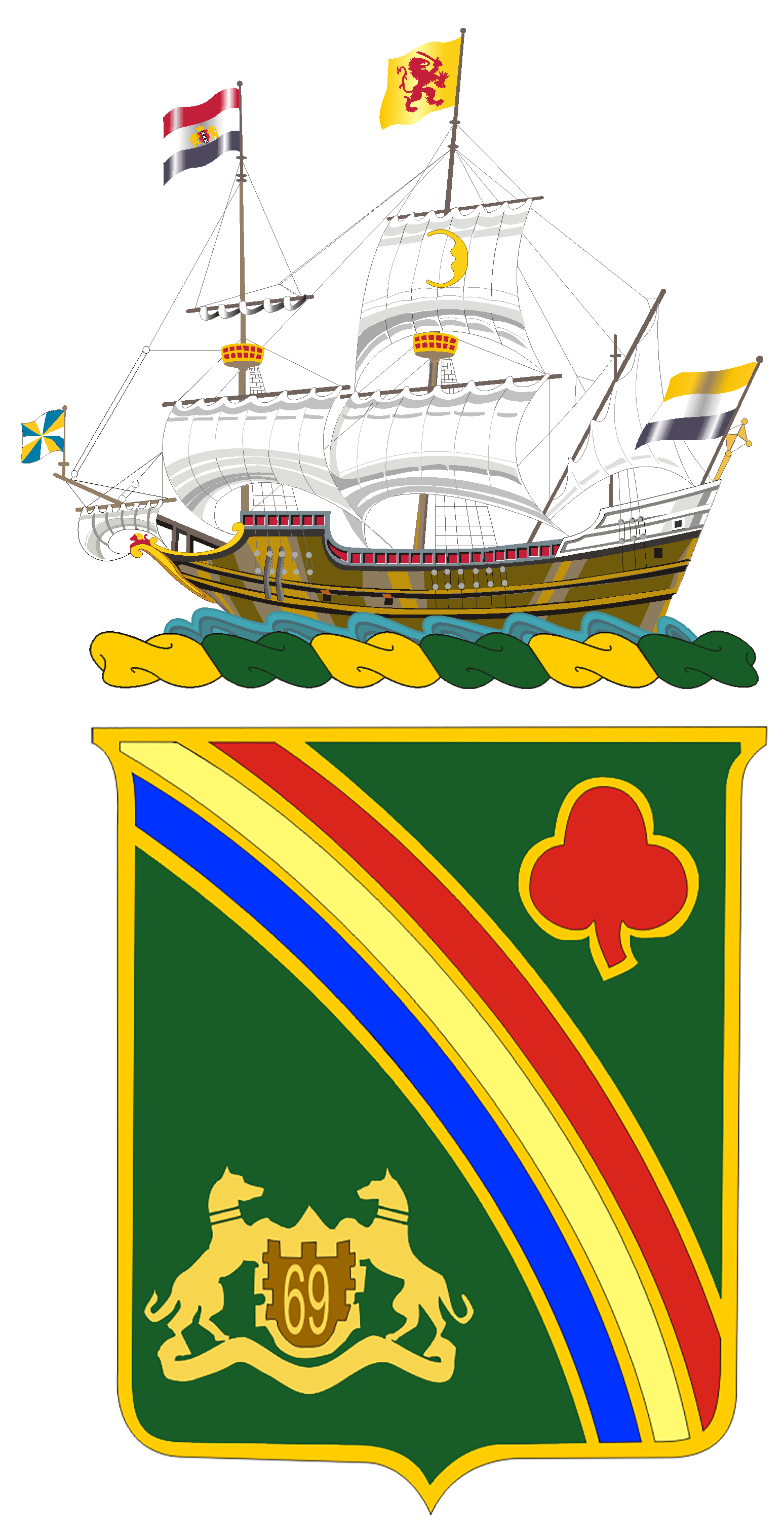
  - (165th Infantry) 69th Infantry Regiment
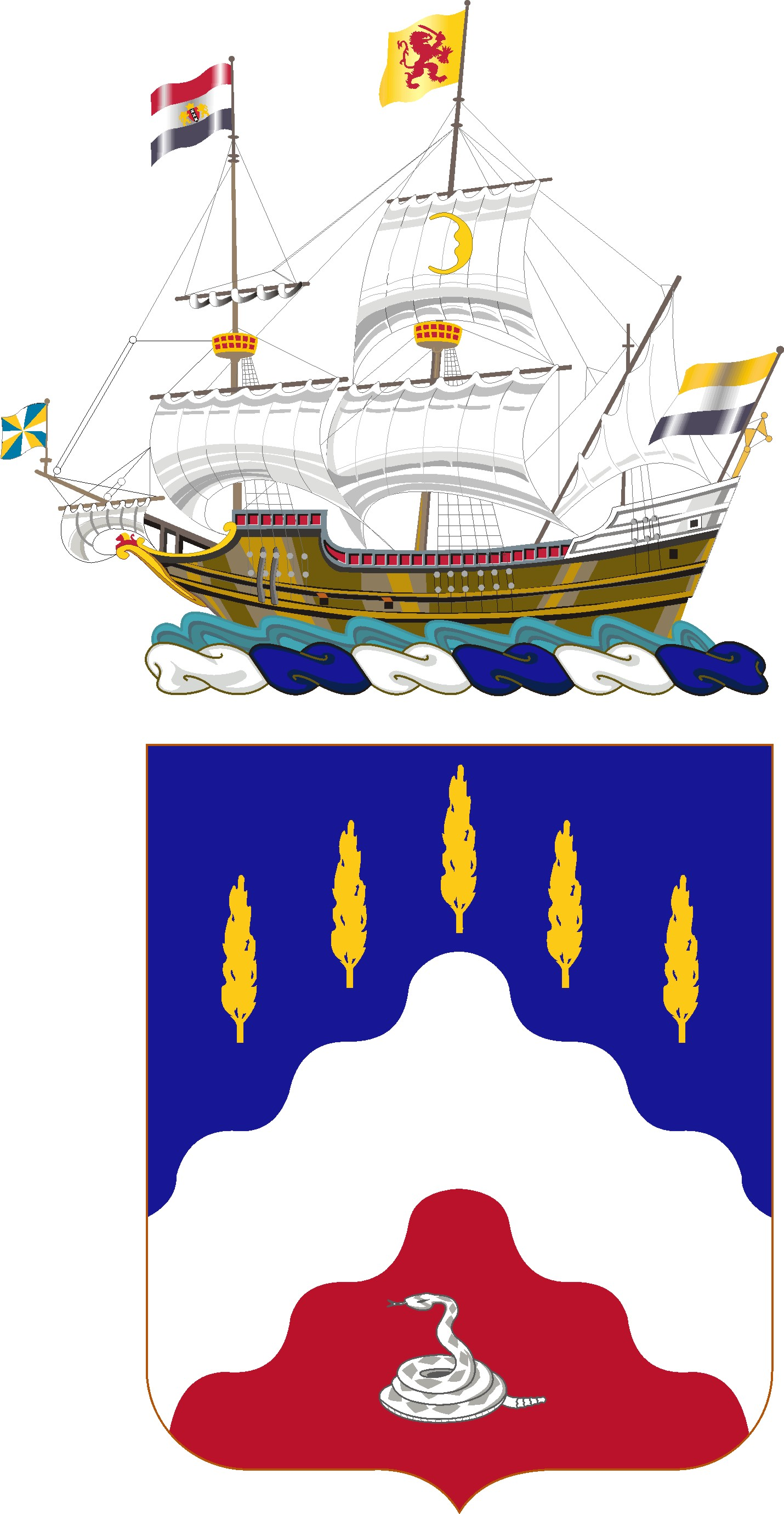
  - 369th Infantry Regiment
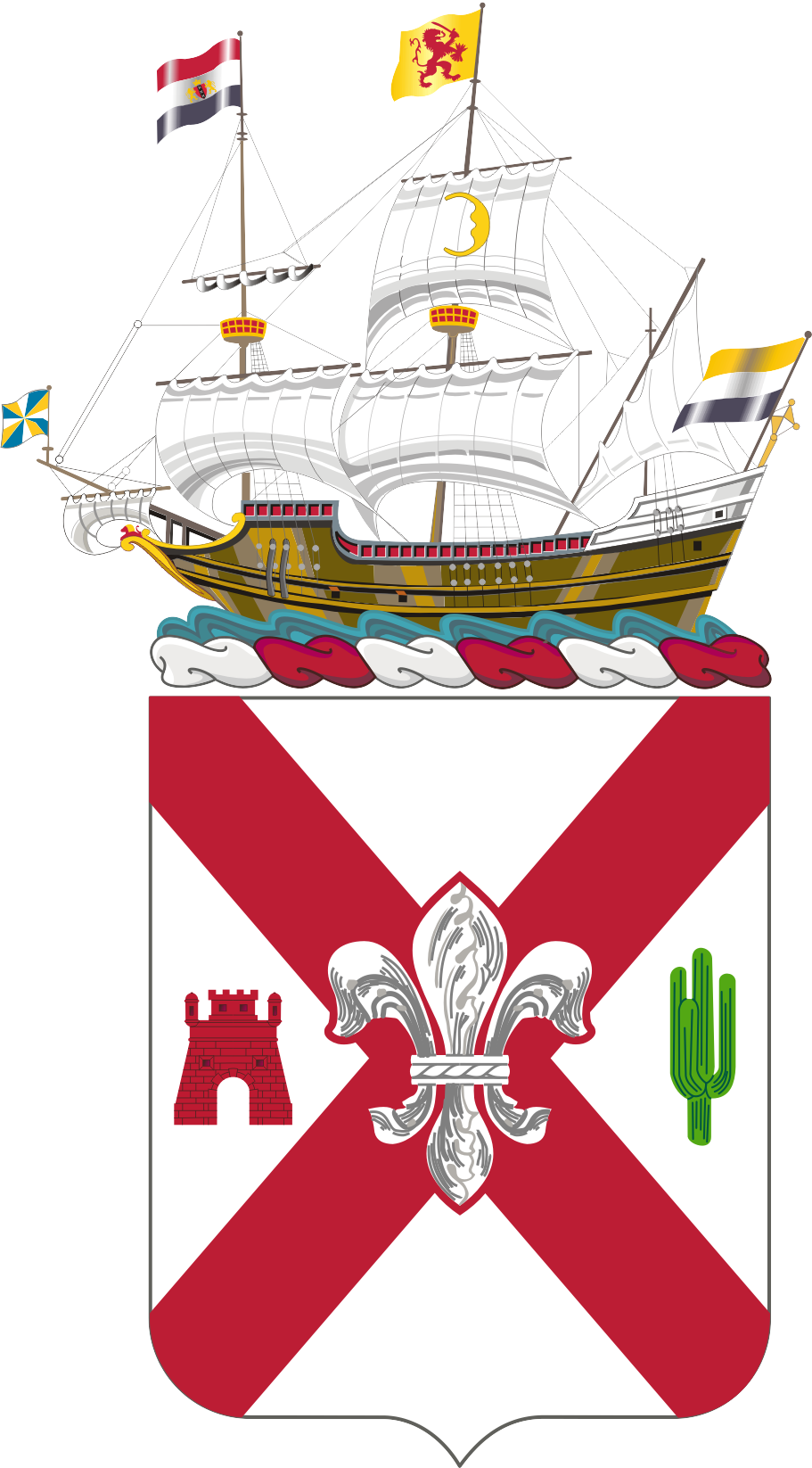
- 174th Infantry Regiment
- 242nd Infantry Regiment
- 104th Field Artillery Battalion
- 105th Field Artillery Battalion
- 106th Armored Field Artillery Battalion
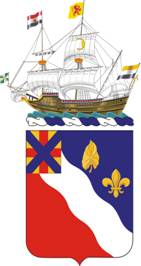
- 156th Field Artillery Regiment
- 170th Field Artillery Battalion
- 186th Armored Field Artillery Battalion
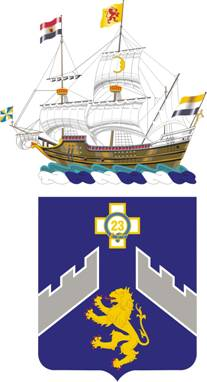
- 186th Field Artillery Regiment
- 187th Field Artillery Battalion
- 226th Field Artillery Battalion
- 249th Armored Field Artillery Battalion
- 270th Field Artillery Battalion
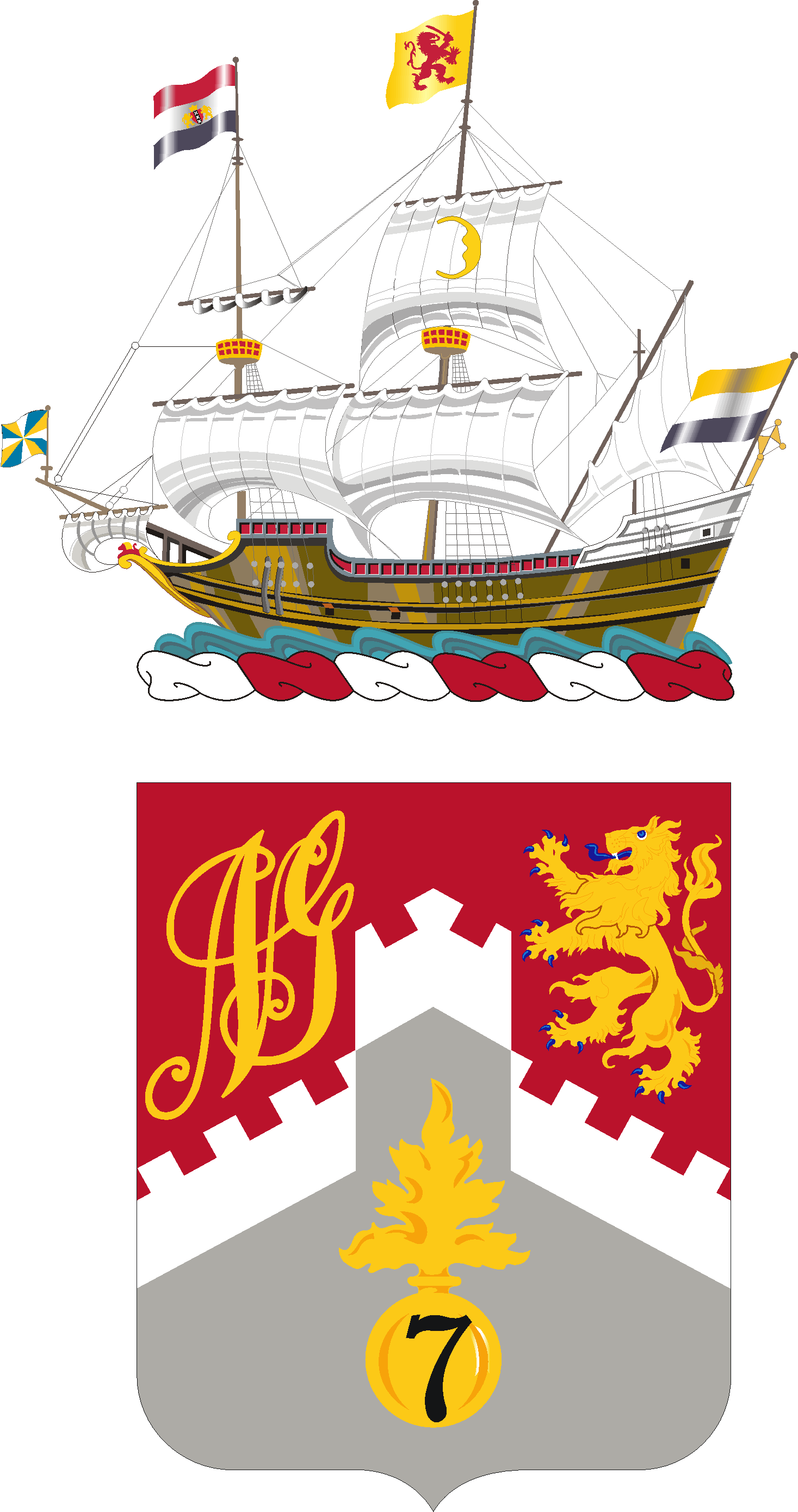
- 207th Coast Artillery (AA)
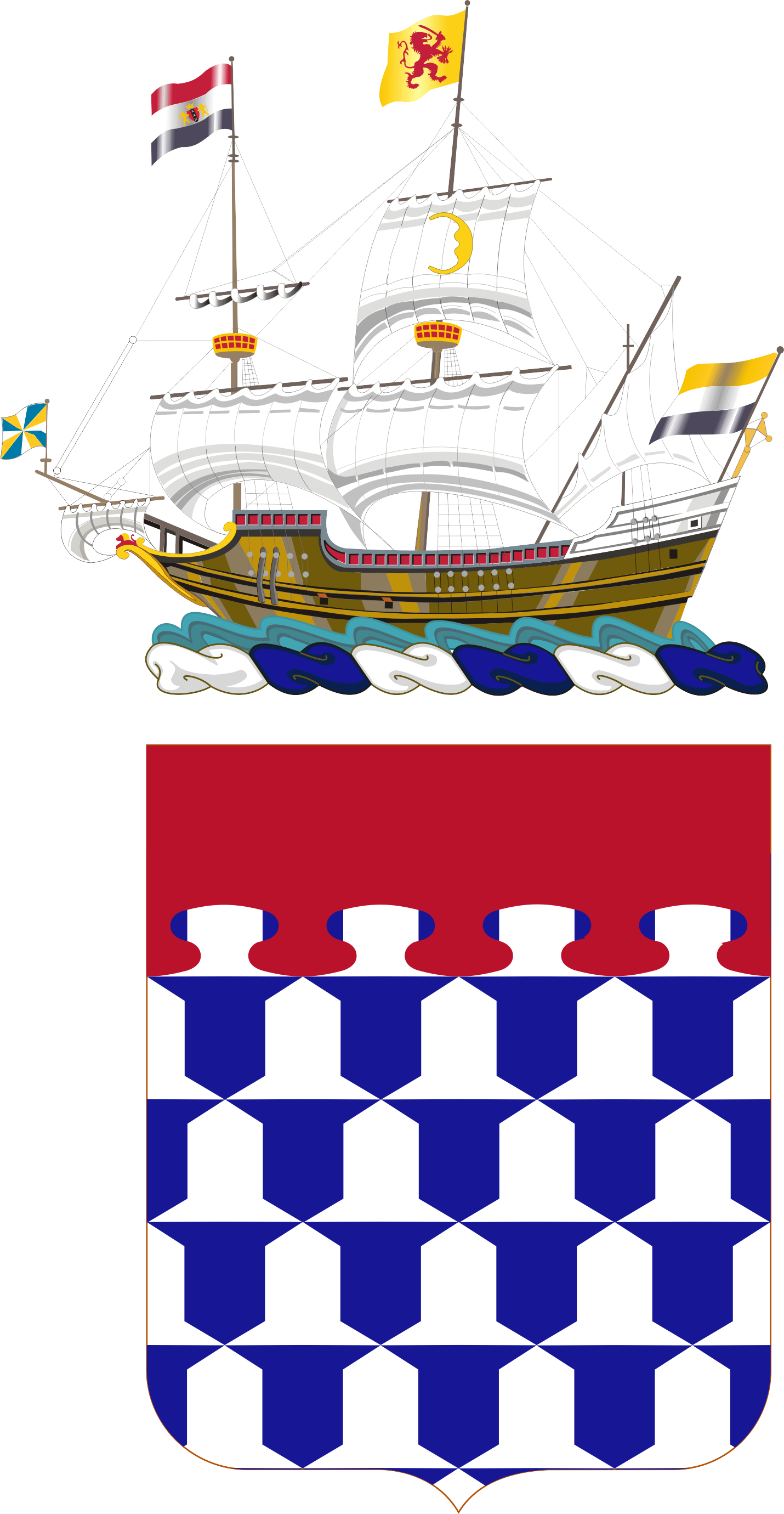
- 212th Coast Artillery (AA)
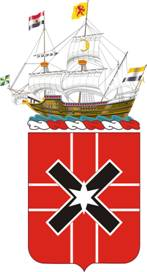
- 152nd Engineer Battalion

== See also ==
- Chauncey Pratt Williams
- Joint Task Force Empire Shield
