= Connecticut Army National Guard =

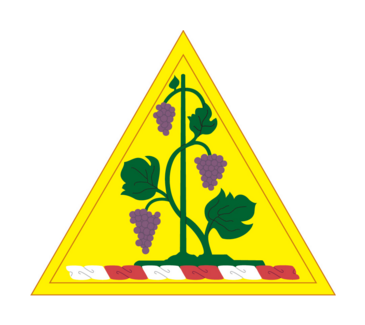
- Active: December 13, 1636 - present
- Country: United States
- Allegiance: Connecticut
- Branch: United States Army National Guard
- Type: ARNG Headquarters Command
- Garrison/HQ: Hartford, Connecticut
- Website: ct.ng.mil

Commanders
- Current commander: BG Ralph F. Hedenberg
- Command Sergeant Major: CSM Arthur Fredericks

Insignia
- Connecticut National Guard Crest

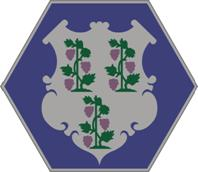
- Connecticut National Guard STARC DUI

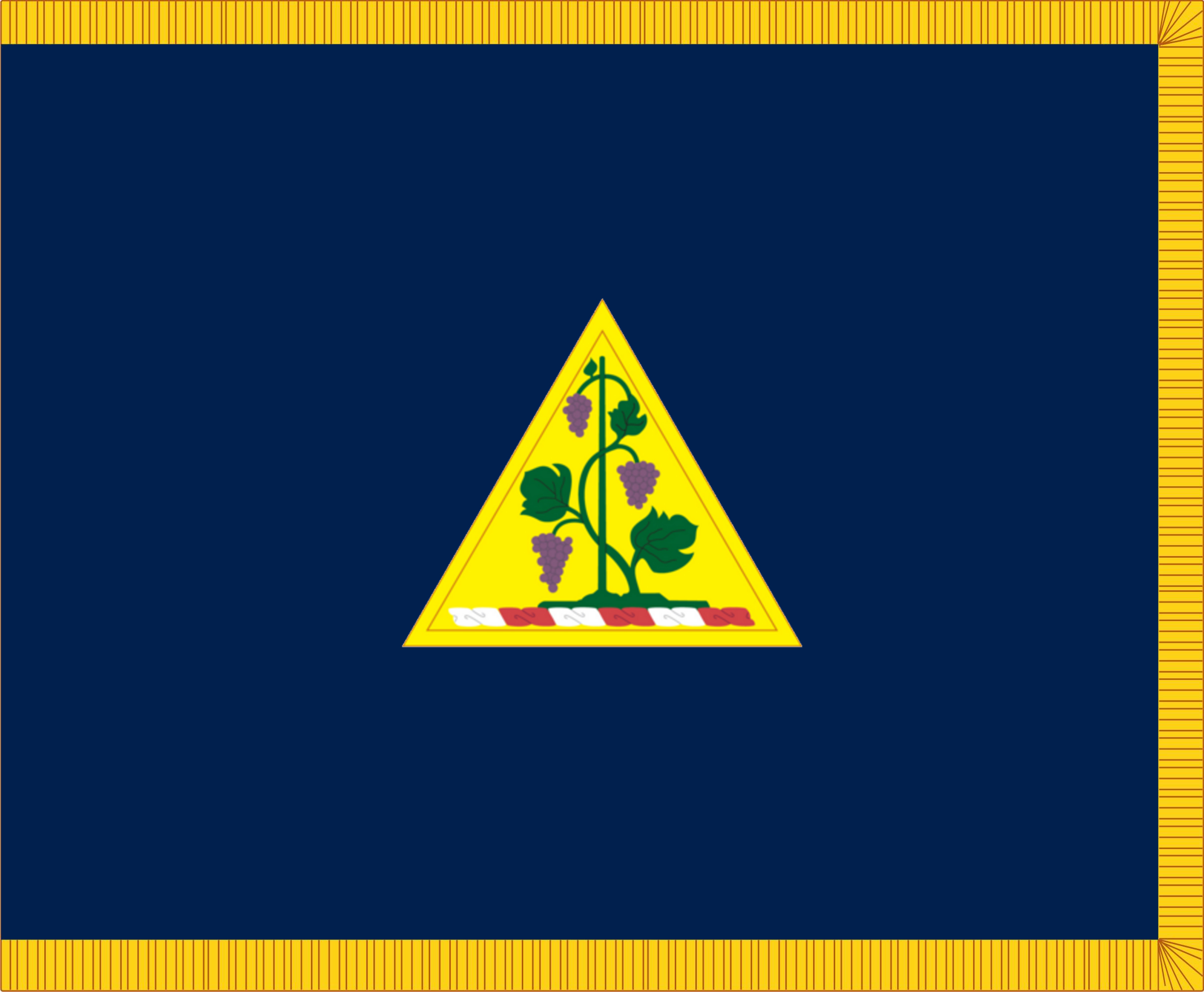
- Connecticut National Guard Headquarters Flag

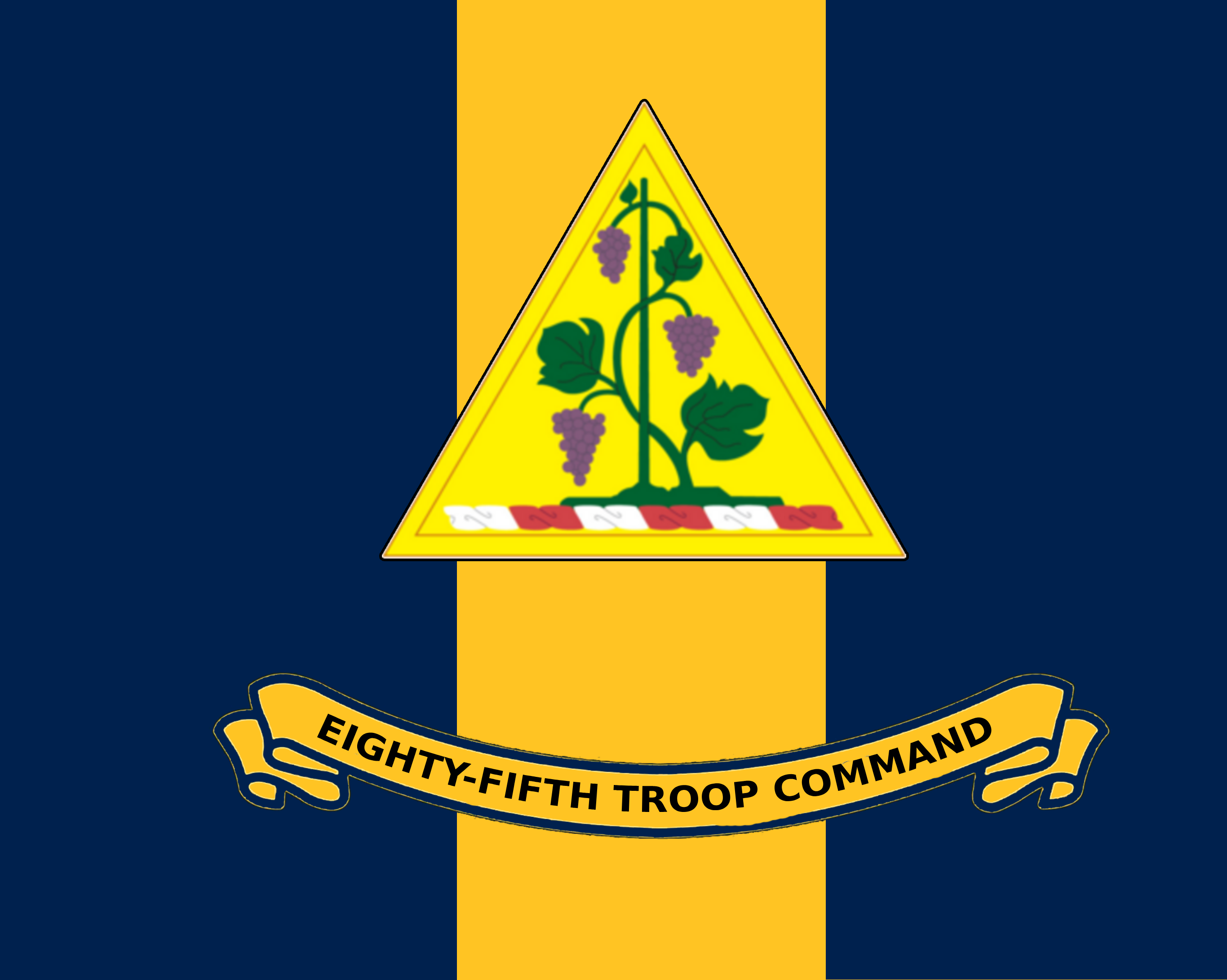
- Connecticut National Guard 85th Troop Command Flag

The Connecticut Army National Guard (CT ARNG) is the ground militia of the State of Connecticut, United States of America. It is, along with the Connecticut Air National Guard, an element of the Connecticut National Guard.

== History ==
The Connecticut Army National Guard was originally formed in 1672. During the War of 1812, the Federalist state government refused to place the state militia under control of the Democratic-Republican national government, which resulted in friction, especially following British attacks on New London and Stonington.

After the American Civil War came to an end in 1865, a segregated company was raised in the Fifth battalion of the Connecticut National Guard so that men of color in New Haven could serve their state. Company A (1870-1919), bearing throughout its service monikers to honor its primary instigator, James H. Wilkins - a sergeant with the famous 54th Massachusetts Volunteer Infantry during the Civil War who bore the national flag at the Battle of Olustee - was also known as the Wilkins Guard, the Wilkins Old Guard, and the Wilkins Tigers.

The Militia Act of 1903 organized the various state militias into the present National Guard system.

The 102nd Infantry Regiment fought with the 26th Infantry Division in World War I and then served with the 43rd Infantry Division from 1924 to 1951–52, including World War II and a deployment to West Germany during the Korean War. Other major historical regiments of Connecticut were the 169th Infantry Regiment and 192nd Field Artillery.

After 1968, the main formation in the state became the 43rd Infantry Brigade of the 26th Infantry Division. The brigade was disbanded during the 1990s. It was reorganized and redesignated as the Headquarters and Headquarters Company, 143rd Area Support Group on 30 September 1997.

== Sites and units from 1999 ==
In 2007, the Connecticut Army National Guard was composed of approximately 5,000 soldiers. It maintains facilities in 22 communities. In 1999, these facilities included 22 armories, eight maintenance shops, four aviation facilities, four training site facilities.

Its units include the 85th Troop Command, 143rd Area Support Group, 14th Civil Support Team (WMD), 248th Engineer Company, 250th Engineer Company, 143rd and 643rd Military Police Companies, 141st and 142nd Medical Companies, the 143rd Combat Service Support Battalion (formerly FSB), the 1109th Aviation Depot (AVCRAD), the 169th Regiment (RTI), and the 192nd Military Police Battalion. The primary combat unit is the 1st Battalion, 102nd Infantry Regiment, assigned to the 86th Infantry Brigade Combat Team, which is headquartered in Vermont.

One CT ARNG aviation base is the Army Aviation Support Facility at Bradley International Airport where the 1st Battalion, 169th Aviation Regiment operate the CH-47F, UH-60A/L, HH-60M & C-12U Other CT ARNG aviation units included Detachment 2, Company C, 3rd Battalion, 126th Aviation Regiment (HH-60M) and Company B, 2nd Battalion (General Support), 104th Aviation Regiment (CH-47F)

== Units in 2026 ==
As of February 2026 the Connecticut Army National Guard consists of the following units:

- Joint Force Headquarters-Connecticut, Army Element, in Hartford
  - Headquarters and Headquarters Detachment, Joint Force Headquarters-Connecticut, Army Element, in Hartford
  - Connecticut Recruiting & Retention Battalion, in Middletown
  - Connecticut Medical Detachment, in Niantic
  - Camp Nett Training Center, in Niantic
  - Stones Ranch Training Center, in East Lyme
  - Army Aviation Support Facility #1, at Bradley Airport
  - Unit Training Equipment Site #1, in East Lyme
  - Combined Support Maintenance Shop #1, in Windsor Locks
  - Field Maintenance Shop #1, in Middletown
  - Field Maintenance Shop #5, in Danbury
  - Field Maintenance Shop #8, in Windsor Locks
  - 85th Troop Command, in Niantic
    - Headquarters and Headquarters Company, 85th Troop Command, in Niantic
    - Company C (Signal), 572nd Brigade Engineer Battalion, in New London (part of 86th Infantry Brigade Combat Team (Mountain)
    - 14th Civil Support Team (WMD), in Windsor Locks
    - 242nd Engineer Detachment (Construction Management Team), in Niantic
    - 1st Battalion, 102nd Infantry Regiment (Mountain), in New Haven (part of 86th Infantry Brigade Combat Team (Mountain)
      - Headquarters and Headquarters Company, 1st Battalion, 102nd Infantry Regiment (Mountain), in New Haven
      - Company A, 1st Battalion, 102nd Infantry Regiment (Mountain), in Danbury
      - Company B, 1st Battalion, 102nd Infantry Regiment (Mountain), in Middletown
      - Company C, 1st Battalion, 102nd Infantry Regiment (Mountain), in New Britain
      - Company D (Weapons), 1st Battalion, 102nd Infantry Regiment (Mountain), in Middletown
      - Company H (Forward Support), 186th Brigade Support Battalion, in Southington
    - 192nd Military Police Battalion, in Niantic
      - Headquarters and Headquarters Detachment, 192nd Military Police Battalion, in Niantic
      - 143rd Military Police Company (Combat Support), in West Hartford
      - 643rd Military Police Company (Detention), in Westbrook
      - 928th Military Police Detachment (Military Working Dog), in Newtown
  - 143rd Regional Support Group, in Middletown
    - Headquarters and Headquarters Company, 143rd Regional Support Group, in Middletown
    - 118th Medical Battalion (Multifunctional), in Middletown
      - Headquarters and Headquarters Detachment, 118th Medical Battalion (Multifunctional), in Middletown
      - 141st Medical Company (Ground Ambulance), in Middletown
      - 142nd Medical Company (Area Support), in Danbury
    - 143rd Combat Sustainment Support Battalion, in Waterbury
      - Headquarters and Headquarters Company, 143rd Combat Sustainment Support Battalion, in Waterbury
      - 102nd Army Band, in Rockville
      - 130th Public Affairs Detachment, in Waterbury
      - 906th Quartermaster Platoon (Field Feeding), in Waterbury
      - 1048th Transportation Company (Medium Truck) (Cargo), in Enfield
    - 192nd Engineer Battalion, in Stratford
      - Headquarters and Headquarters Company, 192nd Engineer Battalion, in Stratford
      - Forward Support Company, 192nd Engineer Battalion, in Stratford
      - 246th Engineer Detachment (Fire Fighting Team — Fire Truck), in East Lyme
      - 247th Engineer Detachment (Well Drilling), in Norwich
      - 248th Engineer Company (Engineer Support Company), in Norwich
      - 250th Engineer Company (Multirole Bridge), in New London
      - 256th Engineer Detachment (Fire Fighting Team — Fire Truck), in East Lyme
  - 1109th Theater Aviation Sustainment Maintenance Group, in Groton
    - Headquarters and Headquarters Detachment, 1109th Theater Aviation Sustainment Maintenance Group, in Groton
    - Company A (Aviation Support), 1109th Theater Aviation Sustainment Maintenance Group, in Groton
    - Company B (Ground Support), 1109th Theater Aviation Sustainment Maintenance Group, in Pearl City (HI) — (Hawaii Army National Guard)
    - 1st Battalion (General Support Aviation), 169th Aviation Regiment, at Bradley Airport
      - Headquarters and Headquarters Company, 1st Battalion (General Support Aviation), 169th Aviation Regiment, at Bradley Airport
        - Detachment 1, Headquarters and Headquarters Company, 1st Battalion (General Support Aviation), 169th Aviation Regiment, at Birmingham–Shuttlesworth Airport (AL) — (Alabama Army National Guard)
        - Detachment 2, Headquarters and Headquarters Company, 1st Battalion (General Support Aviation), 169th Aviation Regiment, at Hunter Army Airfield (GA) — (Georgia Army National Guard)
        - Detachment 3, Headquarters and Headquarters Company, 1st Battalion (General Support Aviation), 169th Aviation Regiment, at Weide Army Airfield (MD) — (Maryland Army National Guard)
        - Detachment 4, Headquarters and Headquarters Company, 1st Battalion (General Support Aviation), 169th Aviation Regiment, at Concord Airport (NH) — (New Hampshire Army National Guard)
      - Company A (CAC), 1st Battalion (General Support Aviation), 169th Aviation Regiment, at Concord Airport (NH) (UH-60L Black Hawk) — (New Hampshire Army National Guard)
        - Detachment 1, Company A (CAC), 1st Battalion (General Support Aviation), 169th Aviation Regiment, at Isla Grande Airport (PR) — (Puerto Rico Army National Guard)
      - Company B (Heavy Lift), 1st Battalion (General Support Aviation), 169th Aviation Regiment, at Birmingham–Shuttlesworth Airport (AL) (CH-47F Chinook) — (Alabama Army National Guard)
        - Detachment 1, Company B (Heavy Lift), 1st Battalion (General Support Aviation), 169th Aviation Regiment, at Hunter Army Airfield (GA) — (Georgia Army National Guard)
      - Company C (MEDEVAC), 1st Battalion (General Support Aviation), 169th Aviation Regiment, at Weide Army Airfield (MD) (HH-60L Black Hawk) — (Maryland Army National Guard)
        - Detachment 1, Company C (MEDEVAC), 1st Battalion (General Support Aviation), 169th Aviation Regiment, at Muldrow Army Heliport (OK) — (Oklahoma Army National Guard)
        - Detachment 2, Company C (MEDEVAC), 1st Battalion (General Support Aviation), 169th Aviation Regiment, at Chesterfield County Airport (VA) — (Virginia Army National Guard)
      - Company D (AVUM), 1st Battalion (General Support Aviation), 169th Aviation Regiment, at Bradley Airport
        - Detachment 1, Company D (AVUM), 1st Battalion (General Support Aviation), 169th Aviation Regiment, at Concord Airport (NH) — (New Hampshire Army National Guard)
        - Detachment 2, Company D (AVUM), 1st Battalion (General Support Aviation), 169th Aviation Regiment, at Hunter Army Airfield (GA) — (Georgia Army National Guard)
        - Detachment 3, Company D (AVUM), 1st Battalion (General Support Aviation), 169th Aviation Regiment, at Weide Army Airfield (MD) — (Maryland Army National Guard)
        - Detachment 4, Company D (AVUM), 1st Battalion (General Support Aviation), 169th Aviation Regiment, at Muldrow Army Heliport (OK) — (Oklahoma Army National Guard)
        - Detachment 5, Company D (AVUM), 1st Battalion (General Support Aviation), 169th Aviation Regiment, at Chesterfield County Airport (VA) — (Virginia Army National Guard)
        - Detachment 6, Company D (AVUM), 1st Battalion (General Support Aviation), 169th Aviation Regiment, at Birmingham–Shuttlesworth Airport (AL) — (Alabama Army National Guard)
      - Company E (Forward Support), 1st Battalion (General Support Aviation), 169th Aviation Regiment, at Bradley Airport
        - Detachment 1, Company E (Forward Support), 1st Battalion (General Support Aviation), 169th Aviation Regiment, at Concord Airport (NH) — (New Hampshire Army National Guard)
        - Detachment 2, Company E (Forward Support), 1st Battalion (General Support Aviation), 169th Aviation Regiment, at Hunter Army Airfield (GA) — (Georgia Army National Guard)
        - Detachment 3, Company E (Forward Support), 1st Battalion (General Support Aviation), 169th Aviation Regiment, at Weide Army Airfield (MD) — (Maryland Army National Guard)
        - Detachment 4, Company E (Forward Support), 1st Battalion (General Support Aviation), 169th Aviation Regiment, at Muldrow Army Heliport (OK) — (Oklahoma Army National Guard)
        - Detachment 5, Company E (Forward Support), 1st Battalion (General Support Aviation), 169th Aviation Regiment, at Chesterfield County Airport (VA) — (Virginia Army National Guard)
        - Detachment 6, Company E (Forward Support), 1st Battalion (General Support Aviation), 169th Aviation Regiment, at Birmingham–Shuttlesworth Airport (AL) — (Alabama Army National Guard)
      - Company F (Air Traffic Services), 1st Battalion (General Support Aviation), 169th Aviation Regiment, at Hammond Northshore Airport (LA) — (Louisiana Army National Guard)
    - Detachment 1, Company B (Heavy Lift), 2nd Battalion (General Support Aviation), 104th Aviation Regiment, at Bradley Airport (CH-47F Chinook)
      - Detachment 2, Headquarters and Headquarters Company, 2nd Battalion (General Support Aviation), 104th Aviation Regiment, at Bradley Airport
      - Detachment 2, Company D (AVUM), 2nd Battalion (General Support Aviation), 104th Aviation Regiment, at Bradley Airport
      - Detachment 2, Company E (Forward Support), 2nd Battalion (General Support Aviation), 104th Aviation Regiment, at Bradley Airport
    - Detachment 2, Company C (MEDEVAC), 3rd Battalion (General Support Aviation), 126th Aviation Regiment, at Bradley Airport (HH-60M Black Hawk)
      - Detachment 4, Headquarters and Headquarters Company, 3rd Battalion (General Support Aviation), 126th Aviation Regiment, at Bradley Airport
      - Detachment 4, Company D (AVUM), 3rd Battalion (General Support Aviation), 126th Aviation Regiment, at Bradley Airport
      - Detachment 4, Company E (Forward Support), 3rd Battalion (General Support Aviation), 126th Aviation Regiment, at Bradley Airport
    - Company C, 3rd Battalion (Assault), 142nd Aviation Regiment, at Bradley Airport (UH-60M Black Hawk)
      - Detachment 1, Headquarters and Headquarters Company, 3rd Battalion (Assault), 142nd Aviation Regiment, at Bradley Airport
      - Detachment 1, Company D (AVUM), 3rd Battalion (Assault), 142nd Aviation Regiment, at Bradley Airport
      - Detachment 1, Company E (Forward Support), 3rd Battalion (Assault), 142nd Aviation Regiment, at Bradley Airport
    - Detachment 2, Company B, 2nd Battalion (Fixed Wing), 641st Aviation Regiment (Detachment 6, Operational Support Airlift Activity), at Bradley Airport (C-12 Huron)
  - 169th Regiment, Regional Training Institute, in Niantic
    - Headquarters and Headquarters Detachment
    - 1st Battalion Officer Candidate School
    - 2nd Battalion (Modular Training)
    - 3rd Battalion (Military Police Training)
    - 4th Battalion Warrant Officer Candidate School

Aviation unit abbreviations: CAC — Command Aviation Company; MEDEVAC — Medical evacuation; AVUM — Aviation Unit Maintenance; AVIM — Aviation Intermediate Maintenance; ATS — Air Traffic Service
