= 224th Aviation Regiment =

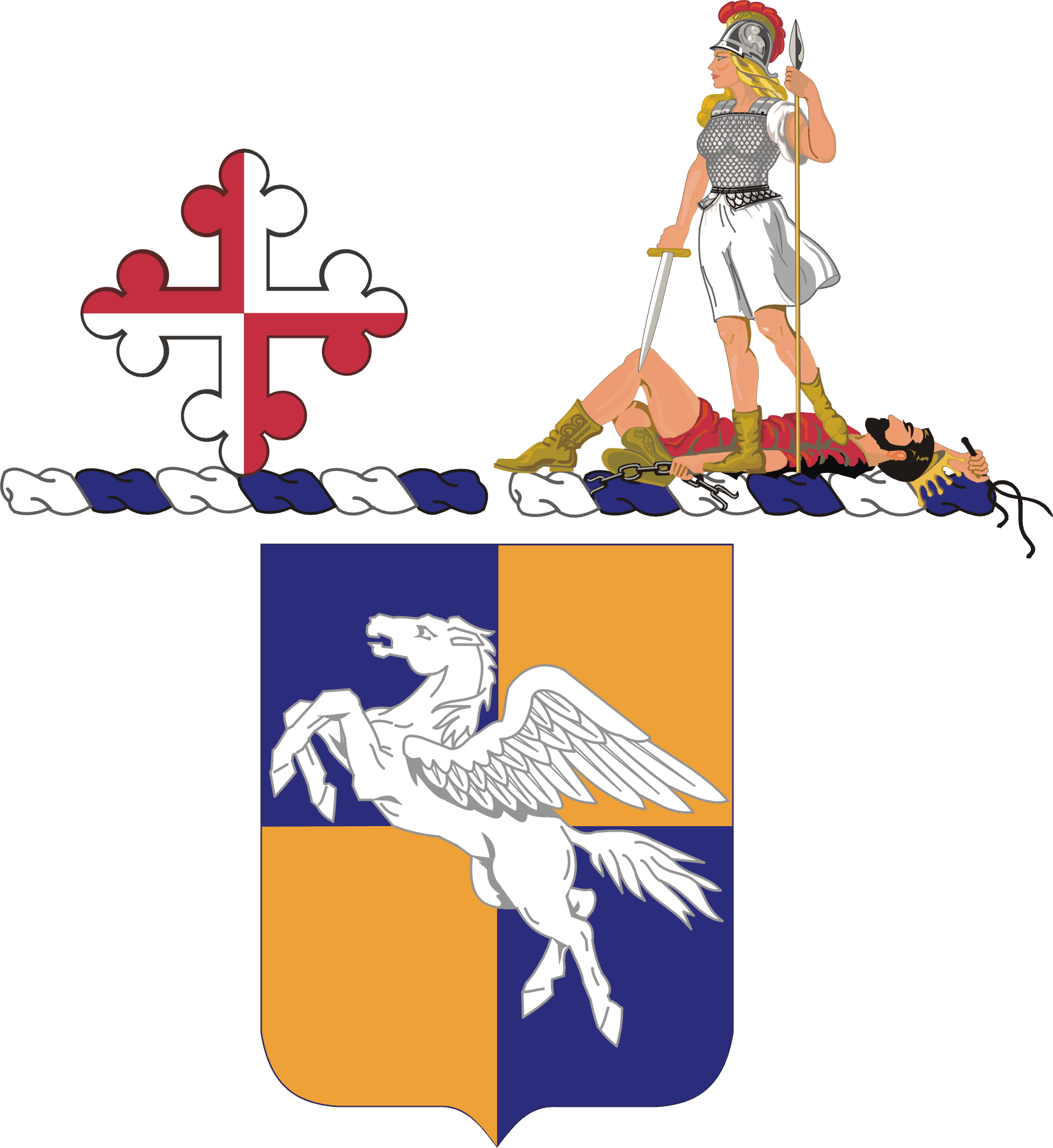
- Coat of arms
- Active: 1987–present
- Country: USA
- Branch: United States Army Aviation Branch
- Type: Aviation
- Part of: Maryland and Virginia Army National Guard

Insignia
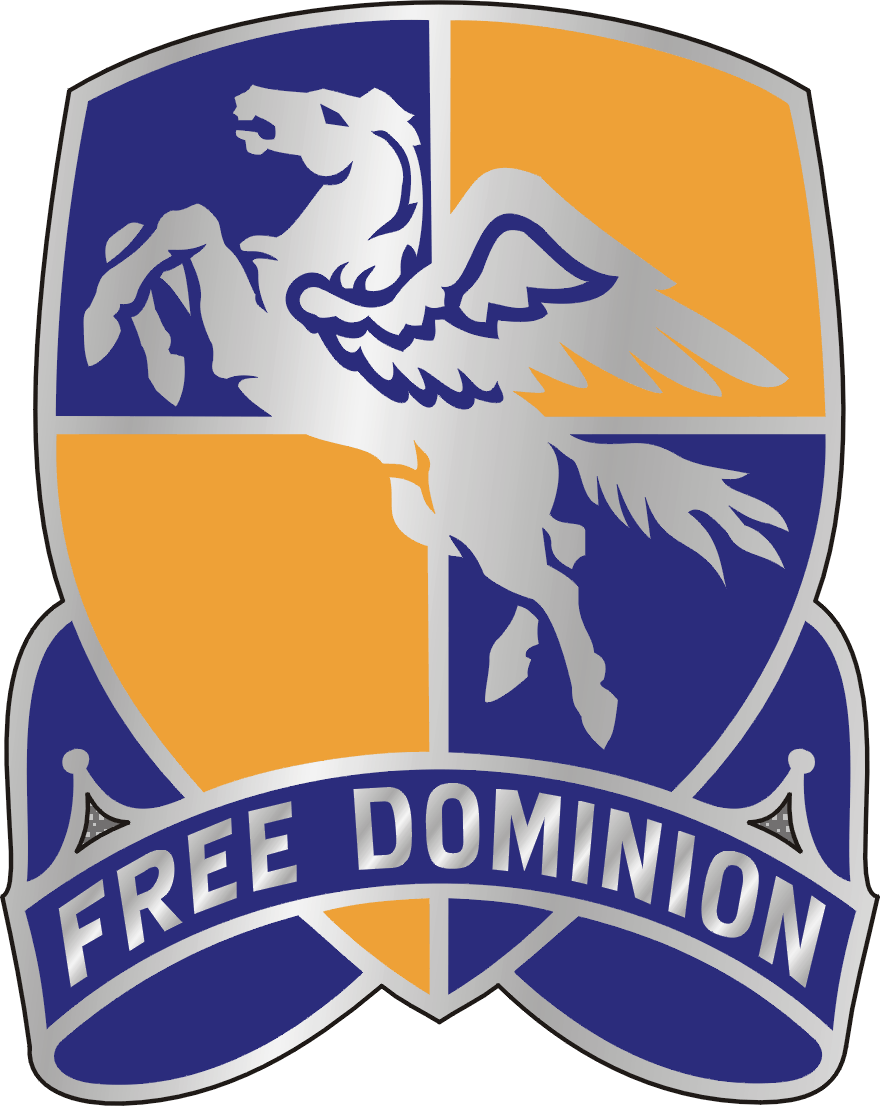
- Distinctive unit insignia

Aircraft flown
- Utility helicopter: UH-60L Black Hawk; UH-72A Lakota

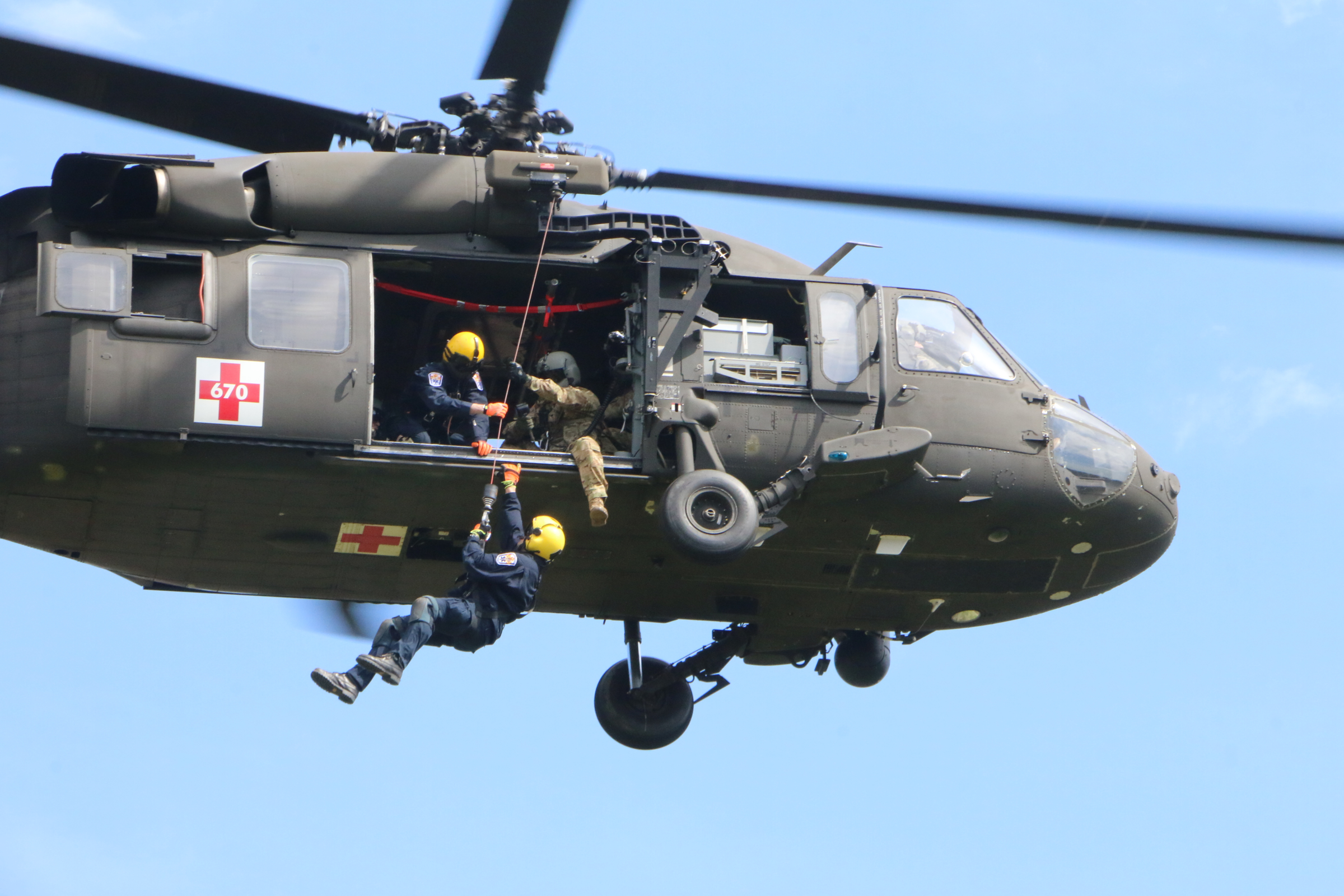
Soldiers assigned to the 2nd Battalion, 224th Aviation Regiment conduct rescue hoist demonstration during a Virginia Search and Rescue Conference, circa April 2018

The 224th Aviation Regiment is an aviation regiment of the U.S. Army National Guard.

== History ==
The 224th Aviation was constituted on 1 October 1987 in the Maryland and Virginia Army National Guards as a parent regiment under the United States Army Regimental System, and organized from existing units to include the 1st Battalion and Companies D, E, and F, part of the 29th Infantry Division. On 1 September 1990 it was reorganized to include the 1st and 2nd Battalions, as well as Company F. The 2nd Battalion traces its lineage back to the 2nd Company of the Richmond Howitzers, and thus has American Civil War Confederate, World War I, and World War II campaign credit. On 31 March 1992 Company G was activated. On 1 September 1995 the regiment was reduced to 2nd Battalion and Company F. On 1 September 2000 Company G was transferred from the 29th Division. On 1 September 2003 the regiment was reorganized to eliminate Company F.

On 25 August 2005, the 2nd Battalion was ordered into Federal active service. The 224th's 1st Battalion was activated with the 42nd Infantry Division on 1 October. The two battalions of the regiment included elements from the Maryland, District of Columbia, Guam, Maine, Massachusetts, New Jersey, New York, Pennsylvania, Vermont, and Virginia Army National Guards as a result of the reorganization. Additionally, a small contingent of six soldiers from the Oklahoma National Guard was attached to the 2nd Battalion from December 2005 until February 2007. In December, the 2nd Battalion participated in Exercise Desert Talon at Marine Corps Air Station Yuma alongside the 3rd Marine Aircraft Wing to test its capabilities.

On 25 February 2006, the 2nd Battalion began operations in Al Anbar Governorate during the Iraq War, attached to Marine Aircraft Group 16 (Reinforced) of the 3rd Marine Aircraft Wing at Al Asad Airbase. Equipped with the Sikorsky UH-60 Black Hawk, the battalion was the first Army aviation battalion to be attached to Marine aviation units during the war. On 20 February 2007, the 2nd Battalion was released from active Federal service and reverted to state control. For its actions in Anbar, the battalion (less Company C) was awarded the Navy Unit Commendation.

The regiment was again reorganized on 1 September of that year; as a result, its two battalions included elements from the Maryland, District of Columbia, Maine, Massachusetts, New Jersey, New York, Pennsylvania, Tennessee, Vermont, and Virginia Army National Guards. On 25 February 2011, the 2nd Battalion was ordered into active Federal service, deploying for Operation New Dawn in Iraq. It was returned to Virginia and was released from active Federal service on 30 March 2012, reverting to state control. For its actions the battalion (less Company C) received the Meritorious Unit Commendation (Army). On 2 September 2012 the regiment was reorganized to include elements from the Maryland, District of Columbia, Maine, Massachusetts, New Jersey, New York, Pennsylvania, Vermont, Virginia, and West Virginia Army National Guards in its two battalions.

== Structure ==
- 1st Battalion (Security & Support) at Weide Army Heliport (MD ARNG)
  - Headquarters and Headquarters Company at Ruth Army Aviation Maintenance Facility
    - Deployed to Kosovo between March 2013 and March 2014 for Kosovo Force 17.
  - A Company
    - Detachment 1 at Ruth Army Aviation Maintenance Facility
    - Detachment 2 at Latham, NY (NY ARNG)
  - B Company (UH-72A)
    - Detachment 1 at Army Aviation Support Facility #1, Mid-Ohio Valley Regional Airport (WV ARNG)
  - D Company at Davison Army Airfield (DC National Guard)
    - Detachment 1 (Vermont National Guard)
    - Detachment 2 (Guam National Guard)
- 2nd Battalion (Assault) (Sandston) (VA ARNG)
  - A Company (Sandston) (Alpha Dogs)
  - B Company (Sandston) (Beasts)
  - C Company at Ruth Army Aviation Maintenance Facility (MD ARNG)
    - Returned from Iraq in 2012.
  - D Company (Sandston) (Dragons)
  - E Company (Sandston) (Warriors)
  - Detachment 2, Company B, 248th Aviation Support Battalion (Sandston)(Battle Cats)
  - Detachment 26, Operational Support Airlift Command (Sandston)
  - G Company? (MD ARNG)
