= Chesterfield County Airport =

Airport in Virginia, United States

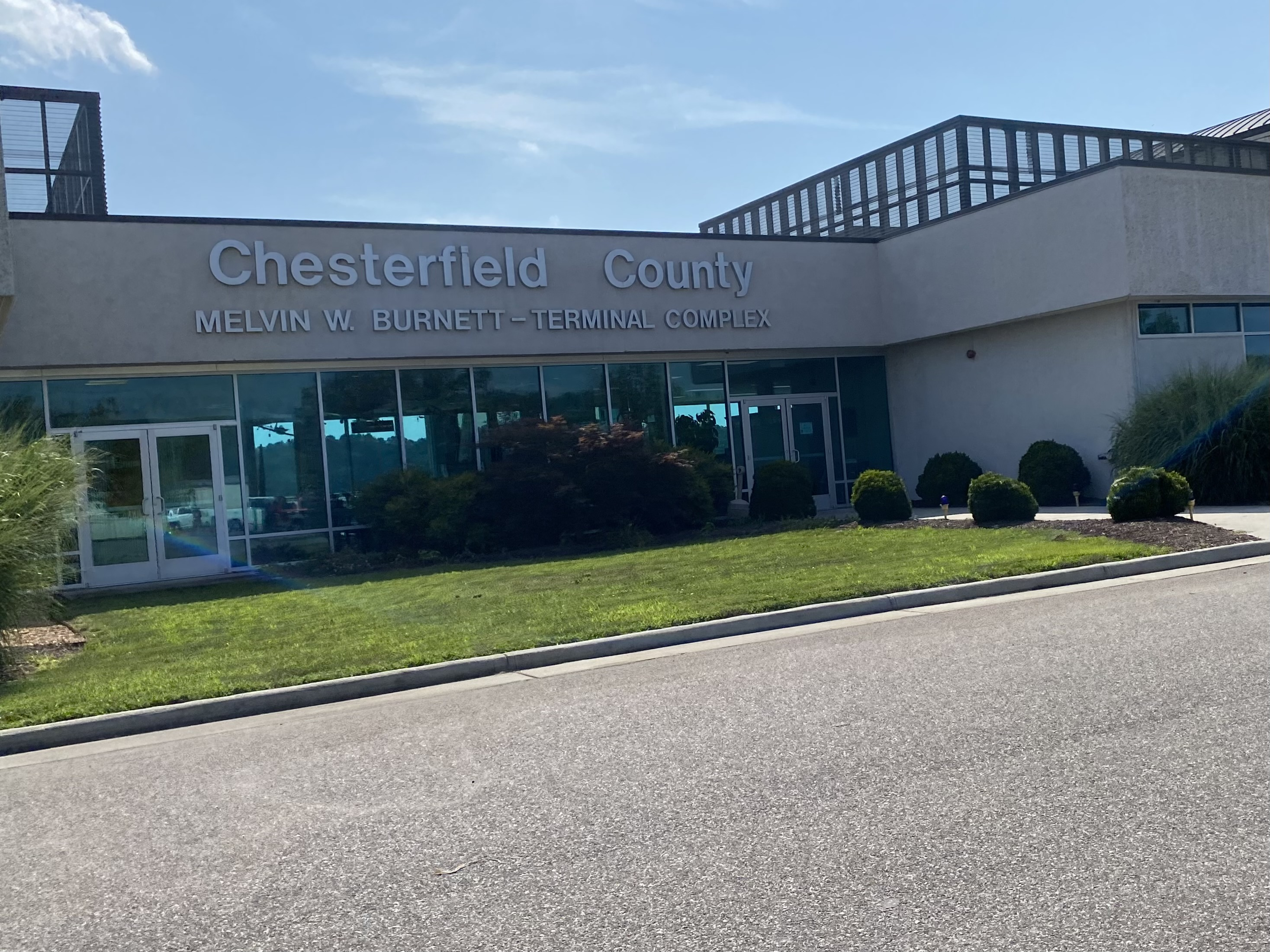
- IATA: none; ICAO: KFCI; FAA LID: FCI

Summary
- Airport type: Public
- Owner: Chesterfield County
- Serves: Richmond, Virginia
- Elevation AMSL: 236 ft (72 m)
- Coordinates: 37°24′24″N 077°31′30″W

Map
- Location of airport in Virginia / United States FCI (the United States)

Runways
Direction	Length		Surface
Direction	ft	m	Surface
15/33	5,500	1,676	Asphalt

Statistics (2020)
- Aircraft operations: 67,623
- Based aircraft: 102
- Source: Federal Aviation Administration

Chesterfield County Airport (ICAO: KFCI, FAA LID: FCI) is a public airport located 10 miles (16 km) southwest of the central business district of Richmond, Virginia, United States, in unincorporated Chesterfield County. It is owned by Chesterfield County.

Although most U.S. airports use the same three-letter location identifier for the FAA and IATA, Chesterfield County Airport is assigned FCI by the FAA but has no designation from the IATA.

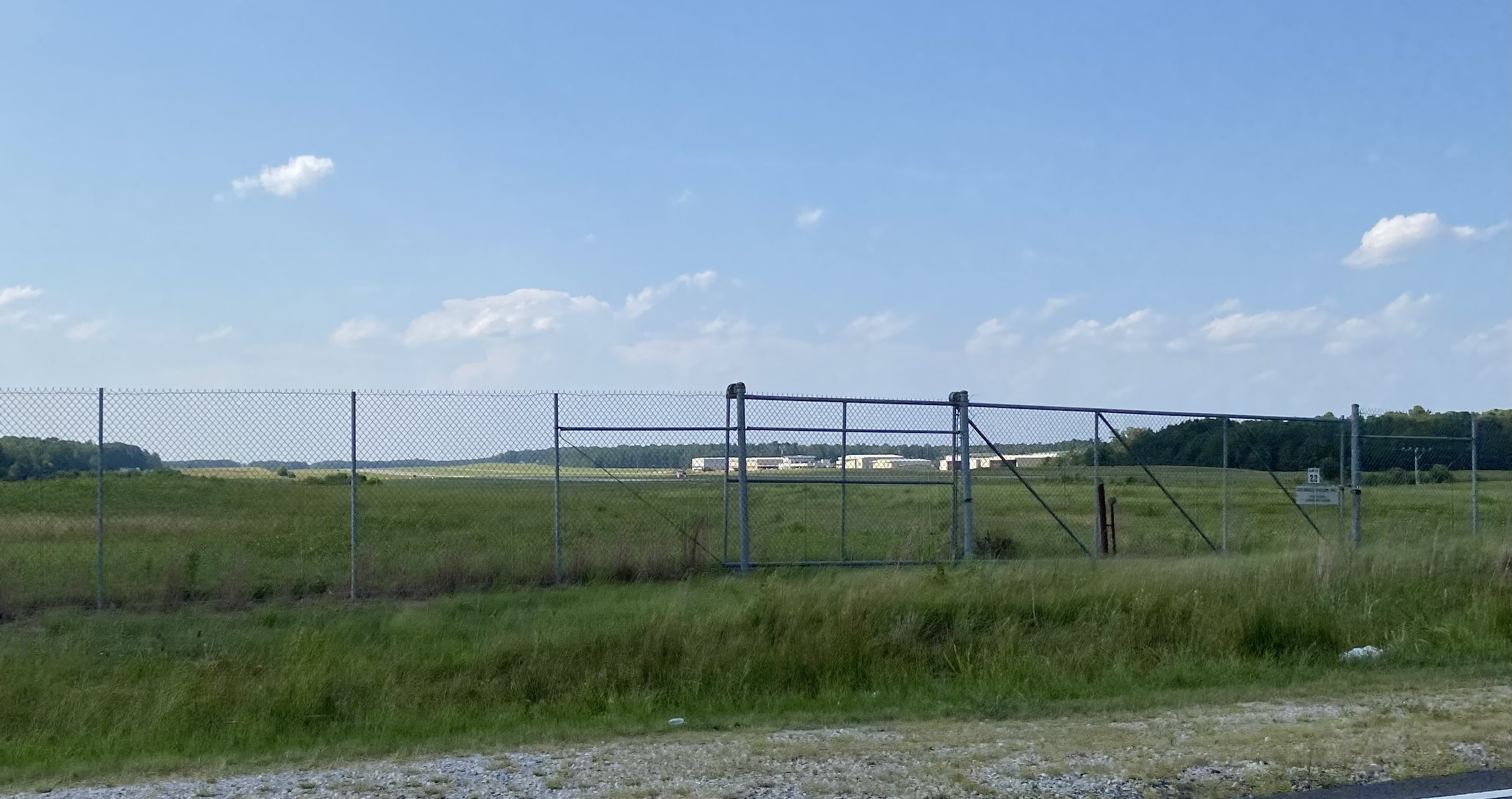
Chesterfield County Airport Runway

== Facilities and aircraft ==
Built in 1973, Chesterfield County Airport covers an area of 593 acres (240 ha), which contains one asphalt paved runway (15/33) measuring 5,500 x 100 ft (1,676 x 30 m). The runway was completely resurfaced in 2007 and repainted in 2008.

Chesterfield County Airport is designated by the FAA as an official general aviation reliever airport for the busier Richmond International Airport. The modern terminal building has internet access, Wi-Fi, flight planning room, showers, vending machines, restaurant, and pilot quiet rooms.

Dominion Aviation Services is the fixed-base operator (FBO) at this field. Fuel, flight training, and aircraft rental are available. Dominion is an FAA certified repair station.

Chesterfield County Airport is the home base of the Wingnuts Flying Club.

The airport is the second busiest in the Richmond region. For the 12-month period ending December 31, 2020, the airport had 67,623 aircraft operations, an average of 185 per day: 97% general aviation, 1% air taxi and 1% military.

There were at that time 102 aircraft based at this airport: 74 single engine, 14 multi-engine, 8 jet and 6 helicopters.

== Public safety and military ==
Chesterfield County Airport is home to part of the Virginia State Police Med-Flight Program and serves as an aviation support facility annex for the Virginia Army National Guard 224th Aviation Regiment. The state police currently has two fixed-wing aircraft and two helicopters based out of their aviation division hangar.
