= 212th Coast Artillery (United States) =

212th Coast Artillery Regiment
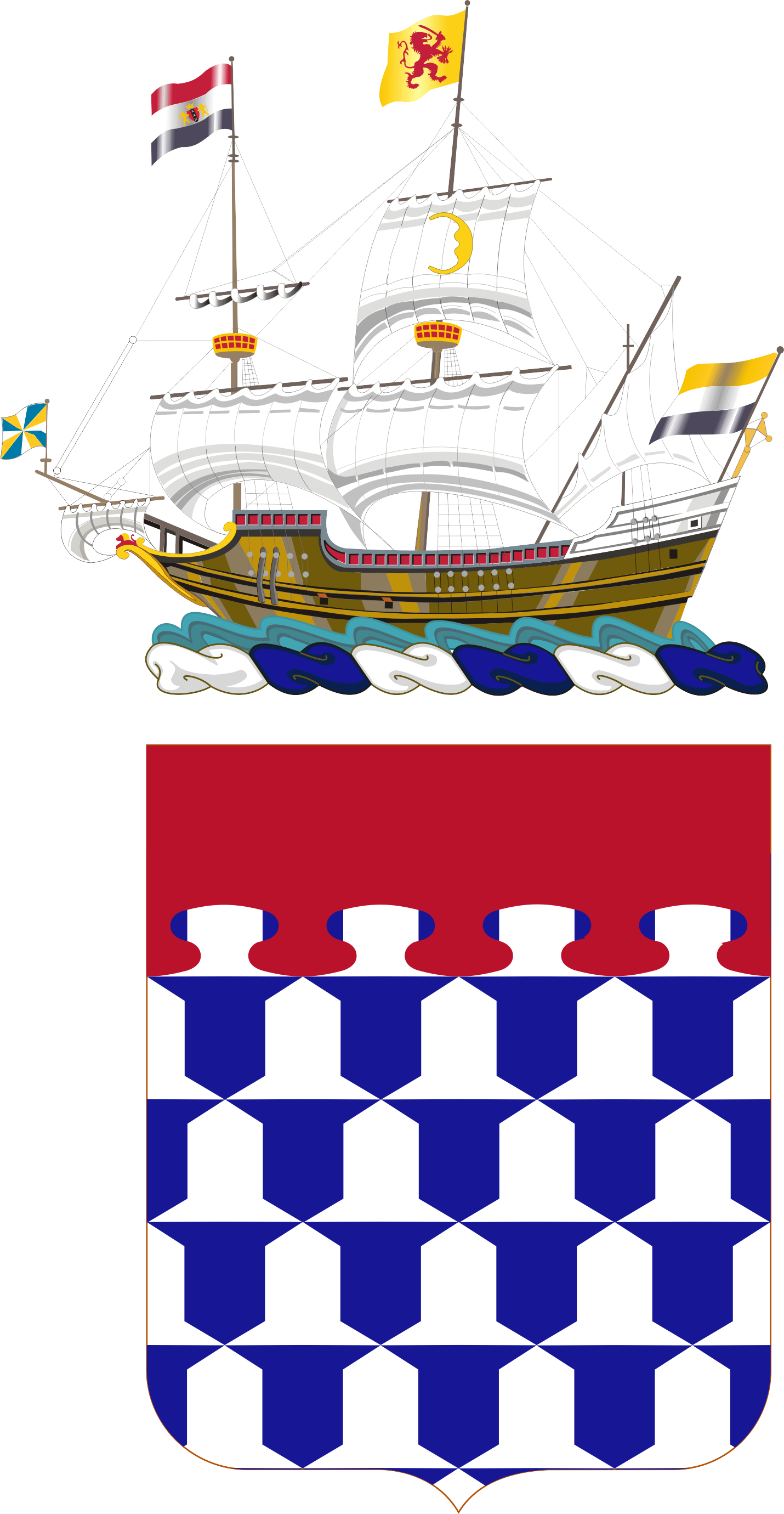
- Coat of arms
- Active: 1921
- Country: United States
- Branch: New York Army National Guard
- Size: Regiment
- Motto(s): "Pro Patria" (For Country)

Commanders
- Notable commanders: Colonel Edward E. Gauche

The 212th Coast Artillery was a Coast Artillery regiment in the New York National Guard.

== Lineage ==
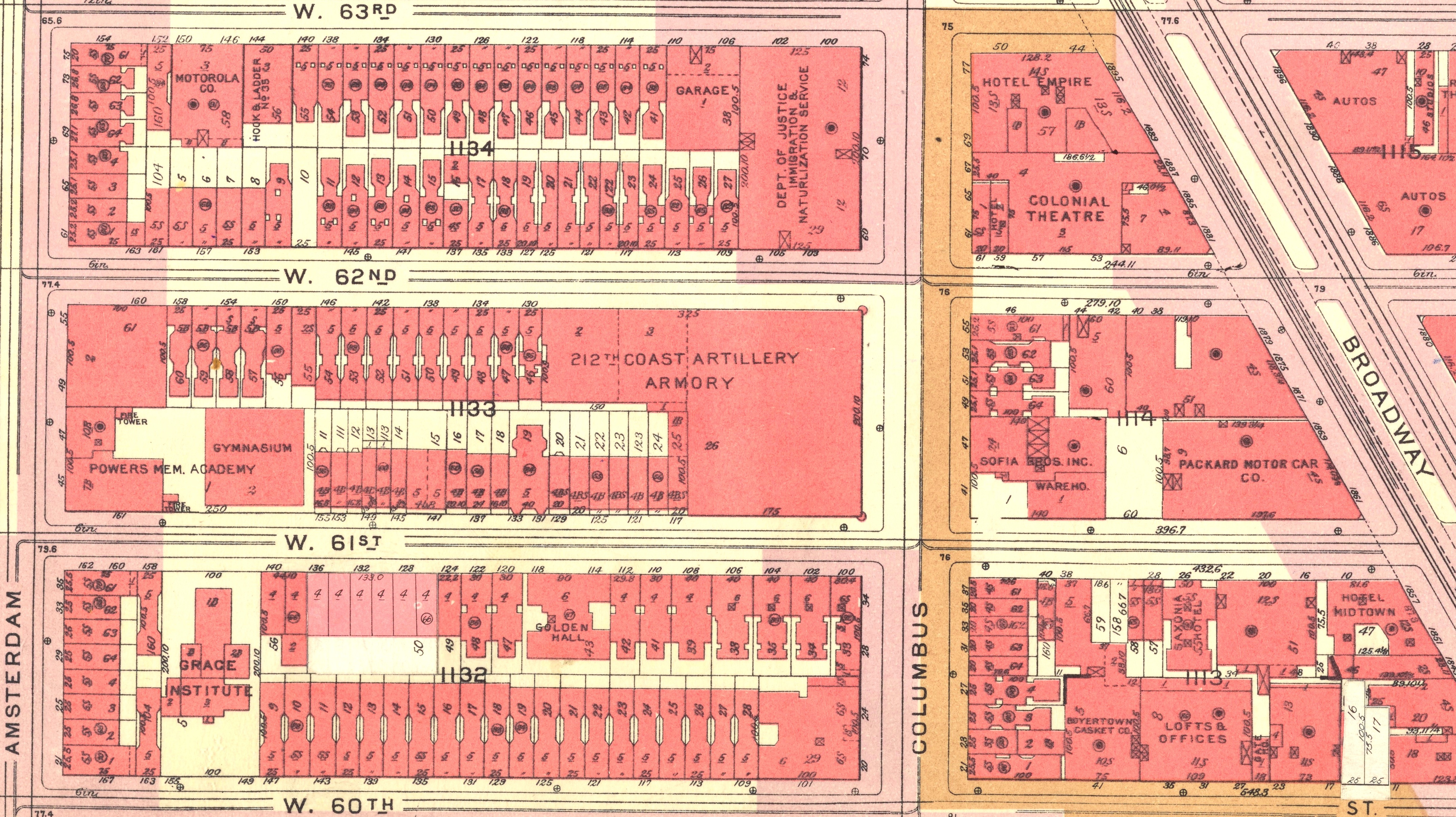
Armory in New York City on a 1950s map

Originally organized as 12th New York Volunteer Infantry in 1859, broken up into Pioneer Infantry 4 January 1918. It was reorganized as 212th Artillery (AA)(Coast Artillery Corps), 9 December 1921 as follows:

- HHB- ?
- 1st Battalion from 59th Pioneer Infantry
- 2nd Battalion from 52nd Pioneer Infantry

Redesignated 14 May 1924 as 212th Coast Artillery (AA)

- inducted into federal service 10 February 1941
- 3rd Battalion constituted 27 May 1942 and organized at Seattle, Washington

Regiment broken up 10 September 1943 at Seattle, Washington as follows-

- HHB as HHB 212th Antiaircraft Artillery Group
- 1st Battalion as 773rd Antiaircraft Artillery Gun Battalion
- 2nd Battalion as 212th Antiaircraft Artillery Automatic Weapons Battalion
- 3rd Battalion as 336th Antiaircraft Artillery Searchlight Battalion
- 212th Antiaircraft Artillery Automatic Weapons Battalion redesignated 142nd Antiaircraft Artillery Battalion, 1 February 1949. Redesignated as 642nd Transportation Battalion, 16 March 1959.
- 773rd reorganized and redesignated 16 March 1959 as 212th Artillery, a parent regiment under the Combat Arms Regimental System.

== Distinctive unit insignia ==
- Description

A Silver color metal and enamel device 1 1/8 inches (2.9 cm) in height overall consisting of a shield blazoned: Vair, a chief nebuly Gules. Attached below the shield a Red scroll turned Silver inscribed “PRO PATRIA” in silver letters.

- Symbolism

The shield of vair represents the allocation of the Regiment to southern New York, as fur constituted a great part of the early trade of this state. Vair originated from the fur of a kind of squirrel (the vair) which was bluey-gray upon the back and white underneath. The red chief is for Artillery and the nebuly partition line is the heraldic symbol for clouds, the field of antiaircraft fire. The motto translates to "For Country".

- Background

The distinctive unit insignia was originally approved for the 212th Coast Artillery Regiment on 25 November 1927. It was redesignated for the 773d Antiaircraft Artillery Gun Battalion on 21 August 1952. It was redesignated for the 773d Antiaircraft Artillery Battalion on 25 March 1958. The insignia was redesignated for the 212th Artillery Regiment on 3 April 1962.

== Coat of arms ==
=== Blazon ===
- Shield

Vair, a chief nebuly Gules.

- Crest

That for the regiments and separate battalions of the New York Army National Guard: On a wreath of the colors Argent and Azure, the full-rigged ship “Half Moon” all Proper. Motto: PRO PATRIA (For Country).

=== Symbolism ===
- Shield

The shield of vair represents the allocation of the Regiment to southern New York, as fur constituted a great part of the early trade of this state. Vair originated from the fur of a kind of squirrel (the vair) which was bluey-gray upon the back and white underneath. The red chief is for Artillery and the nebuly partition line is the heraldic symbol for clouds, the field of antiaircraft fire.

- Crest

The crest is that of the New York Army National Guard.

=== Background ===
The coat of arms was originally approved for the 212th Coast Artillery Regiment on 29 November 1927. It was redesignated for the 773d Antiaircraft Artillery Gun Battalion on 21 August 1952. It was redesignated for the 773d Antiaircraft Artillery Battalion on 25 March 1958. The insignia was redesignated for the 212th Artillery Regiment on 3 April 1962.
