= Weide Army Airfield =

Weide Army Heliport
- IATA: EDG; ICAO: KEDG; FAA LID: EDG

Summary
- Location: Edgewood Arsenal, Maryland
- Built: May 1941
- Elevation AMSL: 21 ft / 6 m
- Coordinates: 39°23′31″N 076°17′29″W

Map
- Location of airport in Maryland

Runways
Direction	Length		Surface
Direction	ft	m	Surface
1-19	1,704	519	Asphalt

Weide Army Heliport (IATA: EDG, ICAO: KEDG, FAA LID: EDG) is a heliport, formerly Weide Army Airfield, located 2 miles (3 km) from Edgewood Arsenal, in the U.S. state of Maryland.

== History ==
On 25 September 1976, a 40,409 square foot building was dedicated at the airfield. About 70 helicopters were based at the airfield to respond to natural disasters.

In 2013, a 100,000 sq ft addition was dedicated to support six CH-47 parking pads.

== See also ==
- Phillips Army Airfield
