= John W. Cudmore =

Surgeon and US Army major general

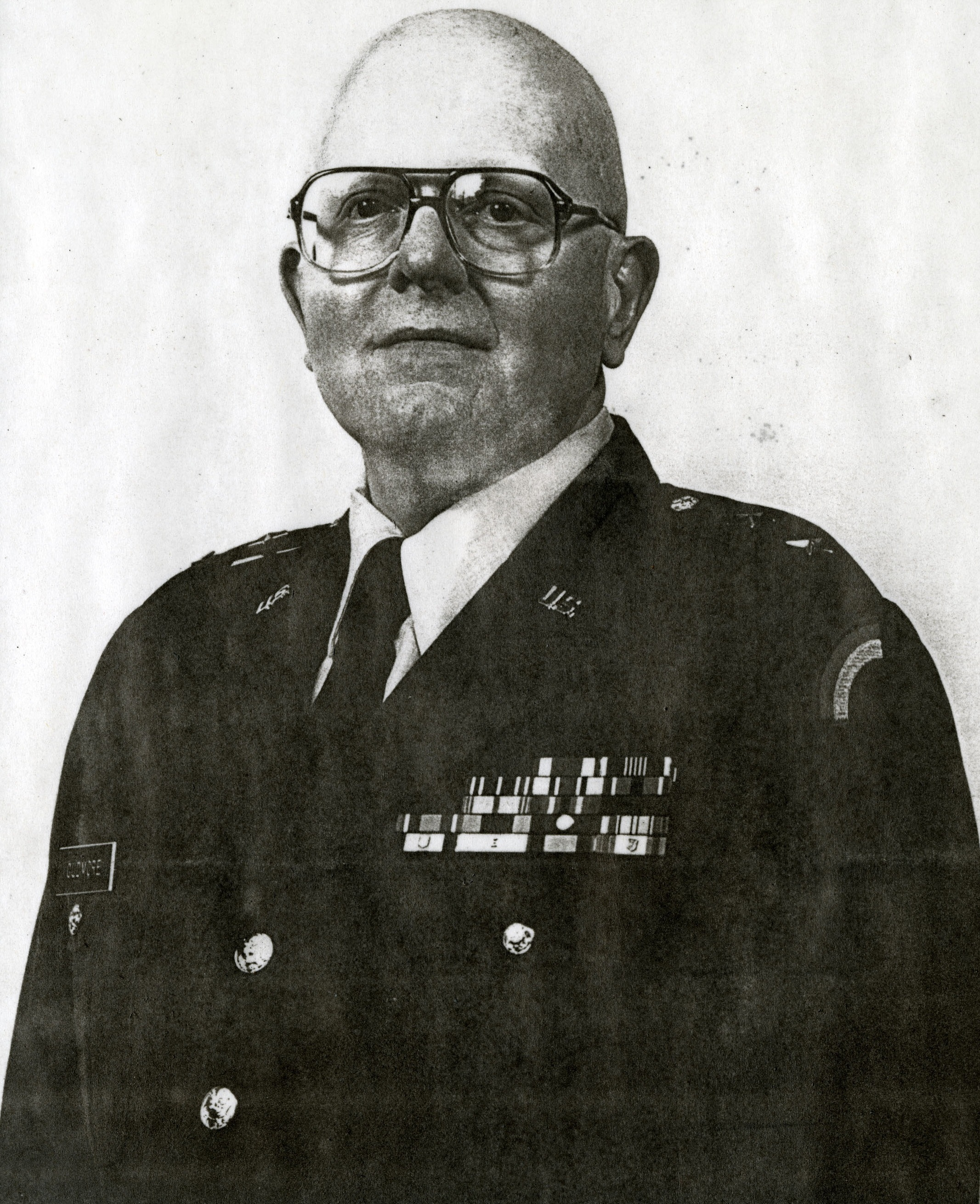
- Cudmore as commander of the 42nd Infantry Division in 1993
- Born: 7 August 1938; Buffalo, New York, US
- Died: 22 February 2023 (aged 84); Buffalo, New York, US
- Burial place: Forest Lawn Cemetery, Buffalo, New York, US
- Education: St. Michael's College, Toronto; University at Buffalo School of Medicine; United States Army Command and General Staff College; United States Army War College
- Spouse: Suzanne Helen Schramm (m. 1964–2023)
- Children: 2
- Military career
- Service: New York Army National Guard
- Service years: 1963–1993
- Rank: Major General
- Nickname: "Jack"
- Units: United States Army Medical Corps; United States Army Corps of Engineers
- Commands: 244th Medical Group; Headquarters Troop Command, New York Army National Guard; Empire State Military Academy; 42nd Infantry Division
- Conflicts: Cold War
- Awards: Meritorious Service Medal; Army Commendation Medal; Army Achievement Medal; Humanitarian Service Medal (Partial list)
- Other work: Surgeon

John W. Cudmore (7 August 1938 – 22 February 2023) was an American surgeon and military officer from Buffalo, New York. After receiving his medical degree in 1962, he completed his surgical internship and residency at Buffalo General Hospital, then remained there as an attending surgeon. He later became president of the hospital's medical staff, and in 1982 joined Health Care Plan of Western New York as the organization's chief of surgery. Cudmore was also a clinical associate professor at the University at Buffalo School of Medicine.

Cudmore joined the New York Army National Guard in 1963. As a Medical Service Corps officer who was also qualified as an Engineer officer, Cudmore was a staff officer for and commander of several National Guard units, including staff surgeon for the 221st Engineer Group and 27th Armored Brigade, and commander of the 244th Medical Group and Headquarters Troop Command. During his military career, he took part in disaster relief and medical support missions throughout New York, including the 1971 Attica Prison riot and 1972 floods in the Southern Tier. He participated in the response to the Blizzard of 1977 and provided medical support during the 1980 Winter Olympics. From 1991 to 1993, he commanded the 42nd Infantry Division with the rank of major general.

In 1993, Cudmore retired from the military and lived in Amherst, New York. In 2001, he retired from his civilian medical career. Cudmore died in Buffalo on 22 February 2023. Cudmore was buried at Forest Lawn Cemetery in Buffalo.

== Early life ==
John William Cudmore was born in Buffalo, New York on 7 August 1938, the son of Dr. William E. Cudmore and Dr. Marguerite M. (Runstadler) Cudmore. He was raised and educated in Buffalo, and was a 1954 graduate of Canisius High School. Cudmore then attended St. Michael's College at the University of Toronto, from which he graduated with a Bachelor of Arts degree in 1958. While in college, Cudmore joined the Theta Delta Chi fraternity and served as secretary and vice president of the Senate Club. In addition, he was an editor of the college newspaper, The Mike. Cudmore was also active in athletics, and played basketball, soccer, water polo, and football.

He then enrolled at the University at Buffalo School of Medicine, from which he received his M.D. in 1962. While in medical school, Cudmore became a member of the Phi Chi fraternity. He was also the vice president of his class and a co-editor of the Medentian yearbook.

=== Family ===
In June 1964, Cudmore married Suzanne Helen Schramm of Kenmore, New York. They were married until his death and were the parents of two children, Jane and William.

== Civilian career ==
After receiving his medical degree, Cudmore completed his surgical internship and residency at Buffalo General Hospital, then remained on the staff as an attending surgeon. He was subsequently appointed president of the hospital's medical staff, and he remained at Buffalo General until 1982, when he became chief of surgery for the Health Care Plan of Western New York. Cudmore was also a clinical associate professor of surgery at the University at Buffalo Medical School and was active in the Buffalo Surgical Society. He retired in 2001.

== Military career ==
Cudmore joined the New York Army National Guard as a first lieutenant in 1963. As a Medical Service Corps officer, he served as a medical staff officer for or commander of several units, including staff surgeon of the 221st Engineer Group and the 27th Armored Brigade. He also commanded the 244th Medical Group for several years. Cudmore was also qualified as an Engineer officer, and his senior command assignments included New York's Headquarters Troop Command and the Empire State Military Academy. He was a graduate of both the United States Army Command and General Staff College and the United States Army War College. In 1991, Cudmore succeeded Martin E. Lind as commander of the 42nd Infantry Division and received promotion to major general. He completed this assignment in 1993 and was succeeded by Robert J. Byrne, after which he retired from the military.

During his military career, Cudmore was activated to provide medical support during several natural disasters and other events. In 1971, he was among the National Guard members who responded to the Attica prison riot. Cudmore testified in a civil suit brought by inmates and former inmates who sought damages because they claimed the state caused unnecessary deaths and injuries by overreacting. During his testimony, Cudmore recounted a chaotic scene of wounded inmates and corrections officers, and stated that armed corrections officers had blocked his path as he attempted to treat injured prisoners.

Cudmore was also part of the New York National Guard's response to the 1972 flooding in the Southern Tier that followed Hurricane Agnes. During the National Guard's response to the Blizzard of 1977, Cudmore made headlines when he flew by helicopter with a five month old baby who was experiencing respiratory issues; his effort to provide life support while en route to a hospital in Bradford, Pennsylvania was covered extensively in the news and in subsequent documentaries.

In 1980, Cudmore commanded National Guard soldiers who provided medical support during that year's Winter Olympics in Lake Placid, New York. Dozens of athletes, officials, organizers, and spectators experienced cold weather injuries as a result of sustained sub-zero temperatures, and he was responsible for overseeing their treatment and evacuation.

== Later life ==
In retirement, Cudmore resided in Amherst, New York. He was a car enthusiast, and belonged to a Lockport, New York sports car club in the late 1950s. He also restored a 1947 MG-TC and a 1974 MG-B GT, which won awards at several car shows. He frequently provided medical support at race tracks in Western New York, and was a member of the Sports Car Club of America and the Buffalo Octagon Association, an organization of MG fans. (Note: MG's logo is an octagon that contains the letters "MG".) Cudmore was also a soccer enthusiast and was a founder of the Delaware Soccer Club, a Buffalo-area youth league, in which he coached and officiated.

Cudmore died in Buffalo on 28 February 2023. He was buried at Forest Lawn Cemetery in Buffalo.

== Dates of rank ==
- First Lieutenant, 19 March 1963
- Captain, 7 April 1965
- Major, 7 October 1969
- Lieutenant Colonel, 25 October 1973
- Colonel, 5 April 1978
- Brigadier General, 23 March 1988
- Major General, 6 February 1991
