= Joseph L. Biehler =

American major general (born 1964)

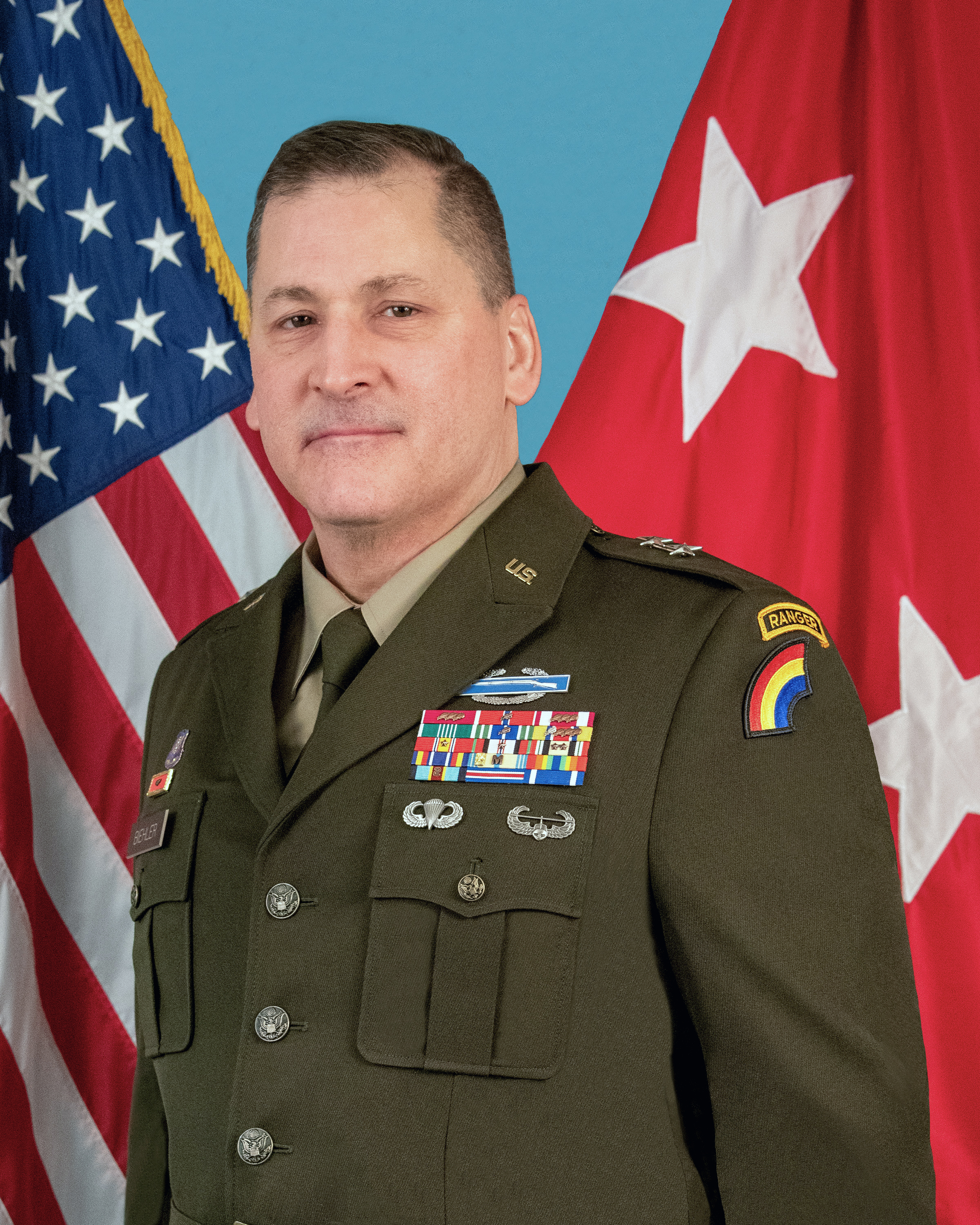
- Biehler as a major general in 2024
- Born: November 17, 1964; Rochester, New York, U.S.
- Education: St. John Fisher University; United States Army Command and General Staff College; United States Army War College
- Spouse: Sonya A. Iwasiw (m. 1998)
- Children: 2
- Military career
- Service: United States Army; New York Army National Guard
- Service years: 1987–2024
- Rank: Major General
- Unit: U.S. Army Infantry Branch
- Commands: 42nd Infantry Division; 53rd Troop Command; 27th Infantry Brigade Combat Team; 2nd Battalion, 108th Infantry Regiment; D Company, 1st Battalion, 108th Infantry Regiment; A Company, 1st Battalion, 108th Infantry Regiment
- Wars: War in Afghanistan; Iraq War; Operation Spartan Shield
- Awards: Legion of Merit (4); Bronze Star Medal (2); Meritorious Service Medal (4); Complete list
- Other work: Chief Financial Officer, Safran Federal Systems

Joseph L. Biehler (born November 17, 1964) is a career officer in the United States Army. A longtime member of the New York Army National Guard, in February 2024 he was promoted to major general as commander of the 42nd Infantry Division.

A native of Rochester, New York, Biehler was raised and educated in Henrietta, New York and graduated from McQuaid Jesuit High School. In 1987, he received bachelor's degrees in management and accounting from St. John Fisher University and received his commission in the New York Army National Guard through the Army Reserve Officers' Training Corps. While pursuing a career in corporate accounting and finance, Biehler became an Infantry officer, and advanced through the ranks in command and staff assignments, including commands at the company, battalion, and brigade level. He served in the War in Afghanistan and Iraq War, and graduated from the United States Army Command and General Staff College and United States Army War College.

As a general officer, Biehler served as deputy commander of the 42nd Infantry Division and commander of the 53rd Troop Command, including deployment to Saudi Arabia for Operation Spartan Shield. In February 2024, Biehler was assigned to command the 42nd Division and received promotion to major general. In September 2024, he retired from the military and was succeeded by Major General Jack A. James Jr.

== Early life and civilian career ==
Joseph Leonard Biehler (pronounced BEE-lur) was born in Rochester, New York on November 17, 1964, the son of John and Barbara Biehler. He was raised and educated in Henrietta, New York, and is a 1983 graduate of McQuaid Jesuit High School. He then attended St. John Fisher University, from which he graduated in 1987 with a Bachelor of Science (BS) degree in management and a BS in accounting. Biehler is a Certified Public Accountant, and in his civilian career, he advanced through accounting and leadership positions including accountant for Deloitte & Touche, finance director of L3Harris, and chief financial officer of Safran Federal Systems, a technology company that provides satellite navigation systems to U.S. federal agencies.

=== Family ===
In August 1998, Biehler married Sonya A. Iwasiw of Webster, New York. They reside in Webster and are the parents of twin sons.

== Military career ==
=== Early career ===
Biehler participated in the Army Reserve Officers' Training Corps while in college and in 1987 he received his commission as a second lieutenant of Infantry. Biehler's early career included completion of the Infantry School's Infantry Officer Basic and Advanced Courses, United States Army Airborne School, United States Army Air Assault School, and Ranger School. His initial assignments included: executive officer, Headquarters and Headquarters Company, 2nd Battalion, 174th Infantry Regiment (June 1987 to February 1988); student at the Infantry Officer Basic Course (February to May 1988); student at the Ranger School (June to August 1988); a second tour as executive officer of 2nd Battalion, 174th Infantry Regiment (August 1988 to September 1989); mortar platoon leader, Company A, 2nd Battalion, 174th Infantry Regiment (October 1989 to September 1990); infantry platoon leader, Company D, 1st Battalion, 108th Infantry Regiment (October 1990 to August 1992); and executive officer, D Company, 1st Battalion, 108th Infantry Regiment (September 1992 to August 1993).

=== Continued career ===
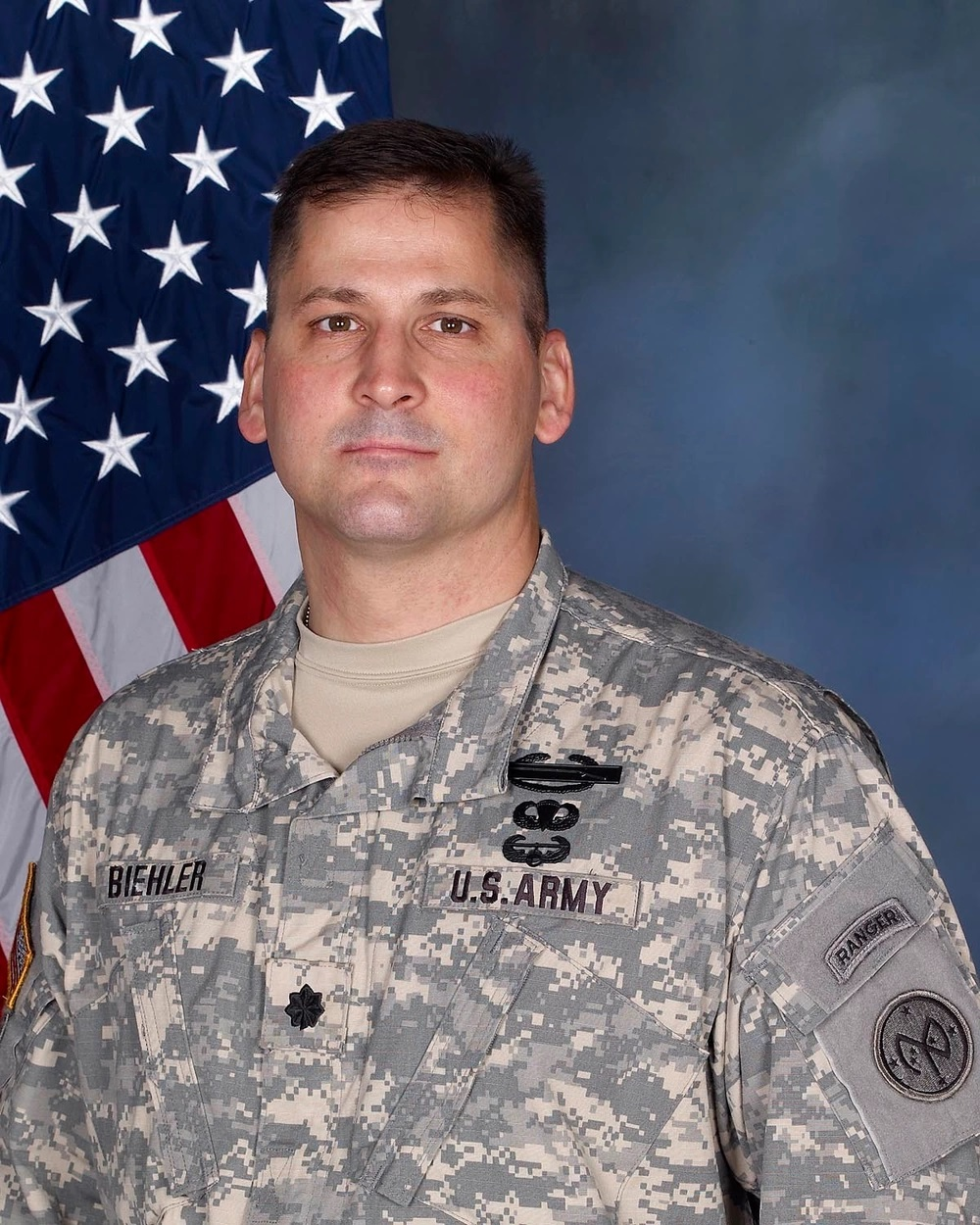
Biehler at the time of his assignment to command the 27th Infantry Brigade Combat Team in 2013

As Biehler's career continued, his company grade officer assignments included: commander, Company A, 1st Battalion, 108th Infantry (September 1993 to September 1995); commander, Company D, 1st Battalion, 108th Infantry (September 1995 to April 1996); commander, Company A, 1st Battalion, 108th Infantry (May 1996 to April 1998); logistics officer (S-4), Headquarters and Headquarters Company, 1st Battalion, 108th Infantry (May 1998 to September 1999); assistant plans, operations and training officer (S-3 Air), Headquarters and Headquarters Company, 1st Battalion, 108th Infantry (October 1999 to January 2000); commander, Company D, 1st Battalion, 108th Infantry (February 2000 to December 2002); and plans officer, Headquarters and Headquarters Company, 27th Infantry Brigade Combat Team (December 2002 to July 2003).

Biehler's field grade officer postings included: plans, operations, and training officer (S-3), Headquarters and Headquarters Company, 2nd Battalion, 108th Infantry, including deployment for Operation Iraqi Freedom in Dujail, Iraq; executive officer, Headquarters and Headquarters Company, 2nd Battalion, 108th Infantry (April 2005 to March 2008); liaison officer, Headquarters, 42nd Infantry Division (April to December 2008); commander, 2nd Battalion, 108th Infantry Battalion, including deployment to Shindand, Afghanistan during Operation Enduring Freedom (December 2008 to February 2013); and commander, 27th Infantry Brigade Combat Team (February 2013 to April 2017).

The professional military education Biehler completed as he advanced through the ranks included the United States Army Combined Arms and Service Staff School, United States Army Command and General Staff College, and United States Army War College. Biehler received a Master of Strategic Studies degree upon completing the war college program of instruction.

=== General officer ===
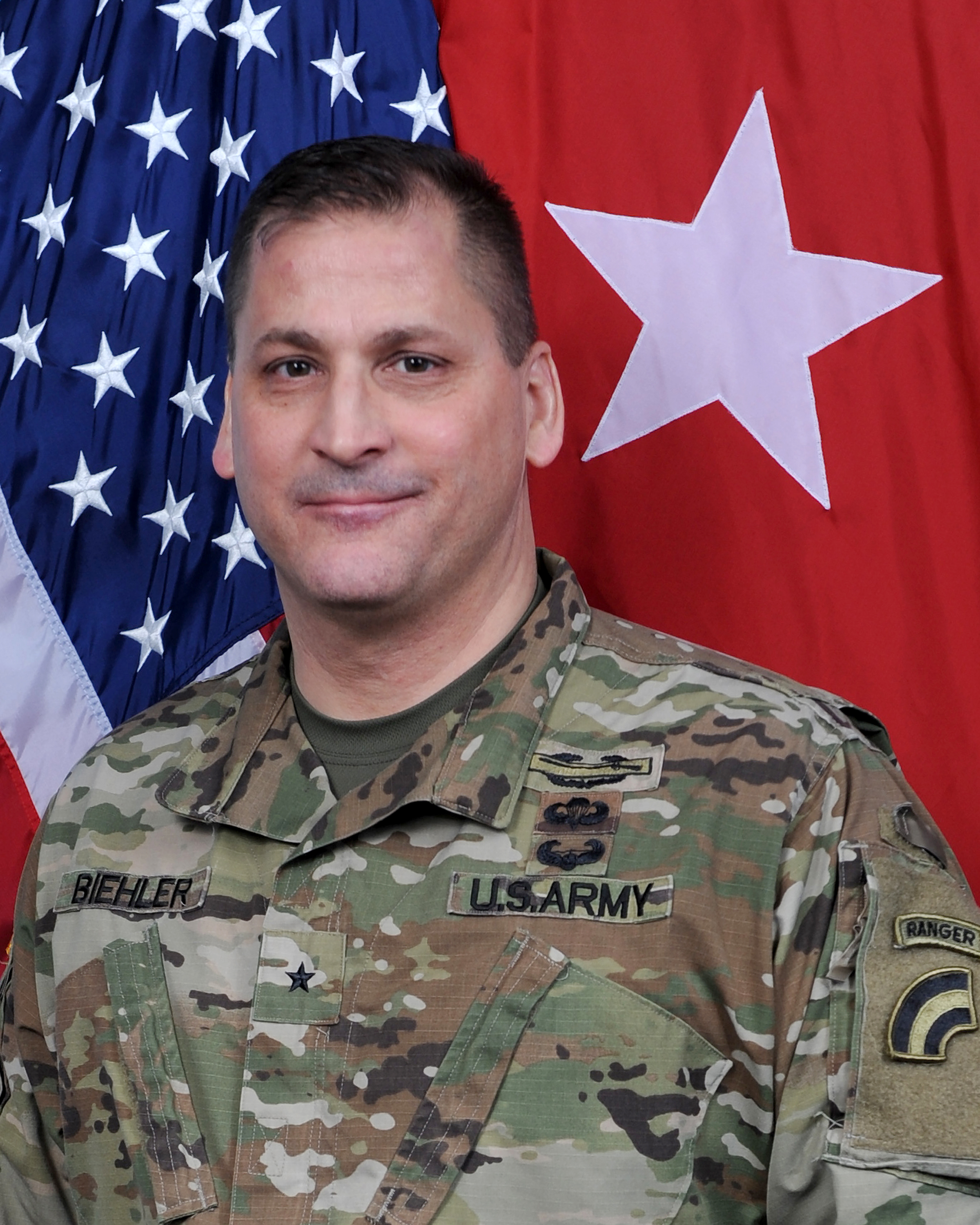
Biehler as deputy commander of the 42nd Division, 2018

After receiving promotion to brigadier general, Biehler served as deputy commanding general for maneuver at Headquarters, 42nd Infantry Division from March 2017 to October 2021, including deployment to Saudi Arabia for Operation Spartan Shield. Professional military education Biehler completed as a general officer included the Army Strategic Education Program – Basic (ASEP-B), the Dual Status Commander Course, and the Joint Task Force Commander Course.

In October 2021, Biehler was assigned as commander of the 53rd Troop Command. In December 2023, Biehler relinquished this command in preparation for assignment as commanding general of the 42nd Infantry Division. In February 2024, Biehler assumed command of the division and was promoted to major general. He retired in September 2024 and was succeeded by Major General Jack A. James Jr.

== Awards ==
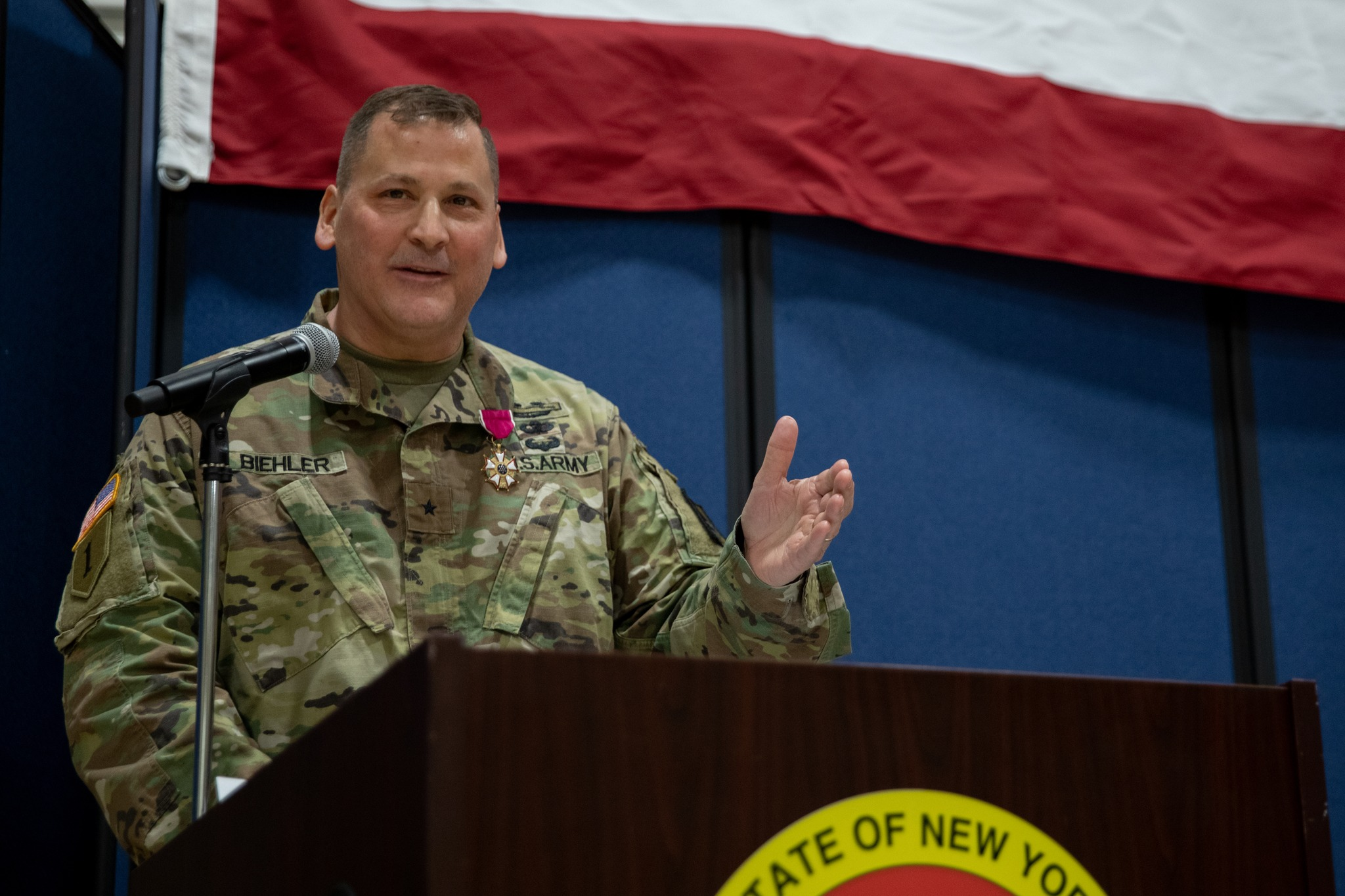
Biehler receives Legion of Merit, December 2023

Biehler's awards and decorations include:

- Legion of Merit with 4 bronze oak leaf clusters
- Bronze Star Medal with 1 bronze oak leaf cluster
- Meritorious Service Medal with 3 bronze oak leaf clusters
- Army Commendation Medal
- Army Achievement Medal with 1 bronze oak leaf cluster
- Army Meritorious Unit Commendation with 1 bronze oak leaf cluster
- Army Reserve Components Achievement Medal with 1 silver and 3 bronze oak leaf clusters
- National Defense Service Medal with 1 bronze service star
- Afghanistan Campaign Medal with 1 bronze service star
- Iraq Campaign Medal with 2 bronze service stars
- Global War on Terrorism Service Medal
- Armed Forces Reserve Medal with Gold hourglass and "M" device
- Army Service Ribbon
- Overseas Service Ribbon with numeral 2
- Army Reserve Components Overseas Training Ribbon
- North Atlantic Treaty Organization Medal
- New York State Long and Faithful Service Medal with gold and silver shield
- New York State Operation Enduring Freedom Service Ribbon
- New York State Operation Iraqi Freedom Service Ribbon
- New York State Conspicuous Service Cross
- Combat Infantryman Badge
- Parachutist Badge
- Air Assault Badge
- Ranger Tab

== Effective dates of promotion ==
The effective dates of Biehler's promotions are:

- Major general, February 3, 2024
- Brigadier general, May 1, 2017
- Colonel, August 1, 2013
- Lieutenant colonel, July 31, 2008
- Major, March 25, 2003
- Captain, June 14, 1994
- First lieutenant, May 27, 1990
- Second lieutenant, June 13, 1987
