= 101st Expeditionary Signal Battalion =

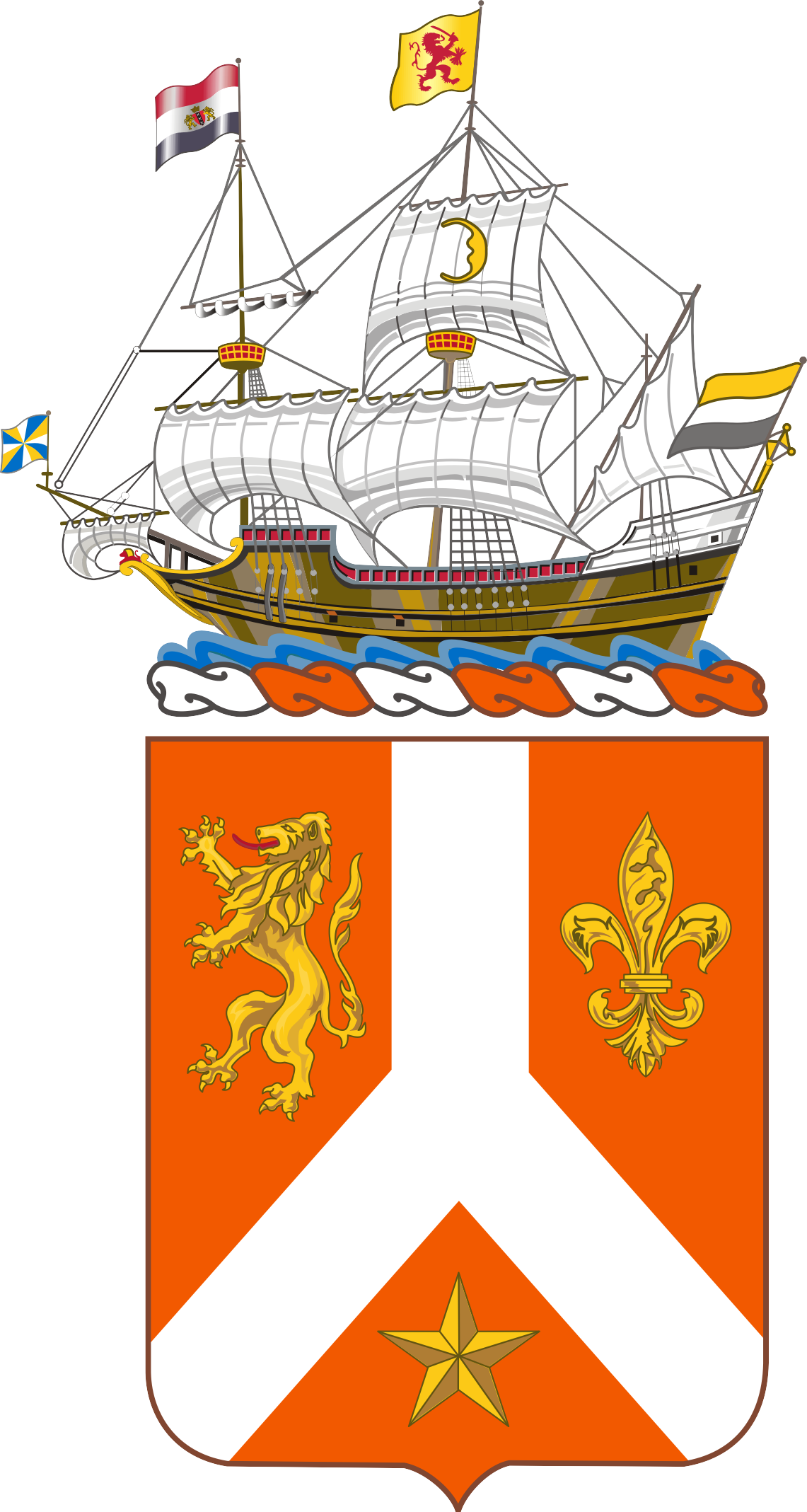
- New York Army National Guard Shoulder Sleeve insignia
- Active: 1 August 2004 – PRESENT
- Country: United States
- Allegiance: United States Army
- Branch: United States Army National Guard
- Type: Headquarters
- Role: Signal
- Size: Battalion
- Part of: New York National Guard
- Garrison/HQ: Yonkers, New York
- Mottos: "Pro Patria Et Unitate" (For Country and Unity)
- Anniversaries: Federally recognized on 6 December 1886. Reorganized as the 101st Signal Bn on 1 August 2004.
- Engagements: WWI: Ypres-Lyes, Somme Offensive, Flanders. WWII: Leyte, Ryukyus. Korean War: First UN counteroffensive, CCF Spring offensive, UN summer-fall offensive, Second Korean winter, Korea – summer/fall 1952, Third Korean Winter, Korea – summer 1953.

Commanders
- Current commander: LTC Paul Mulligan

Insignia
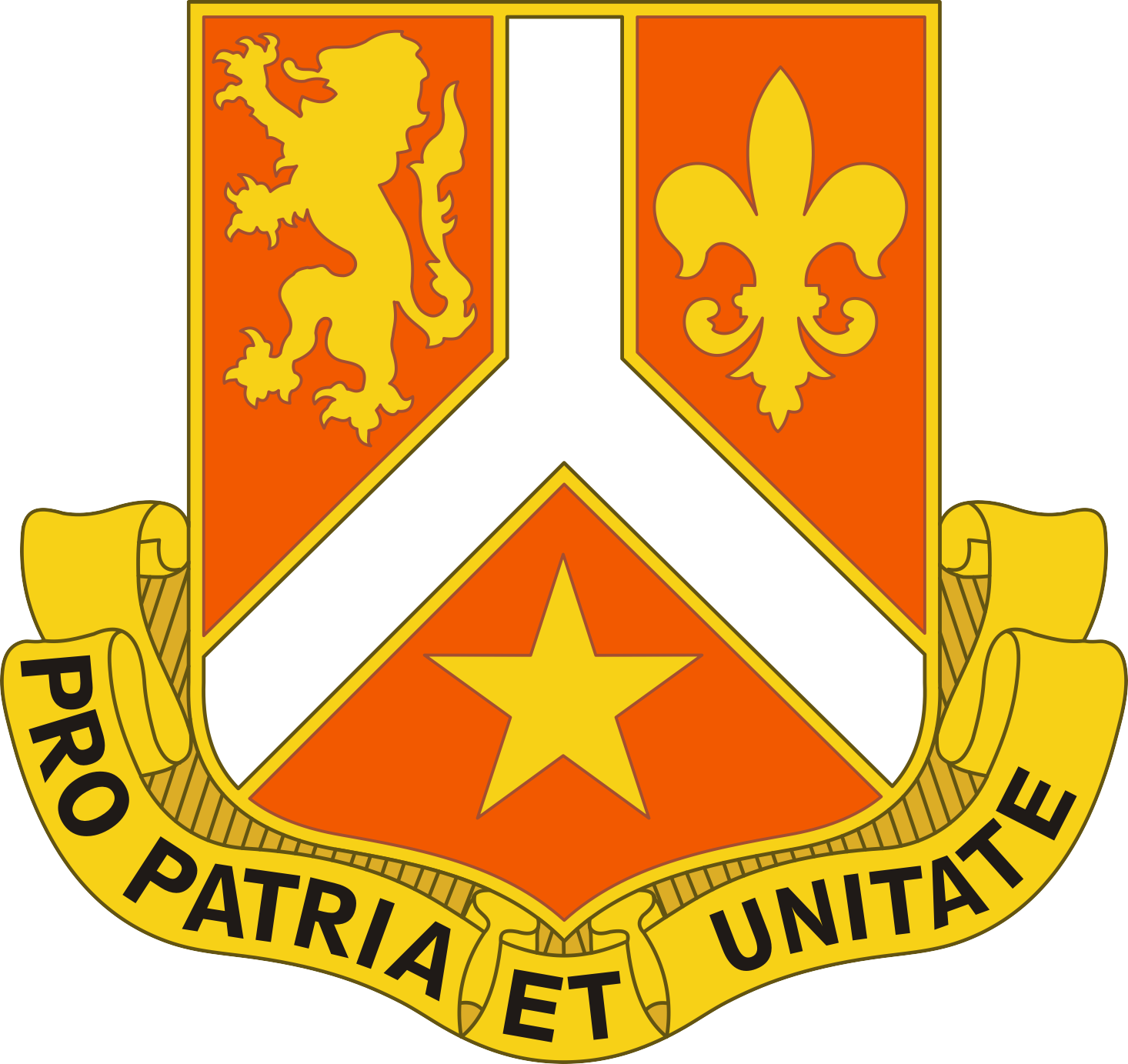
- Distinctive unit insignia

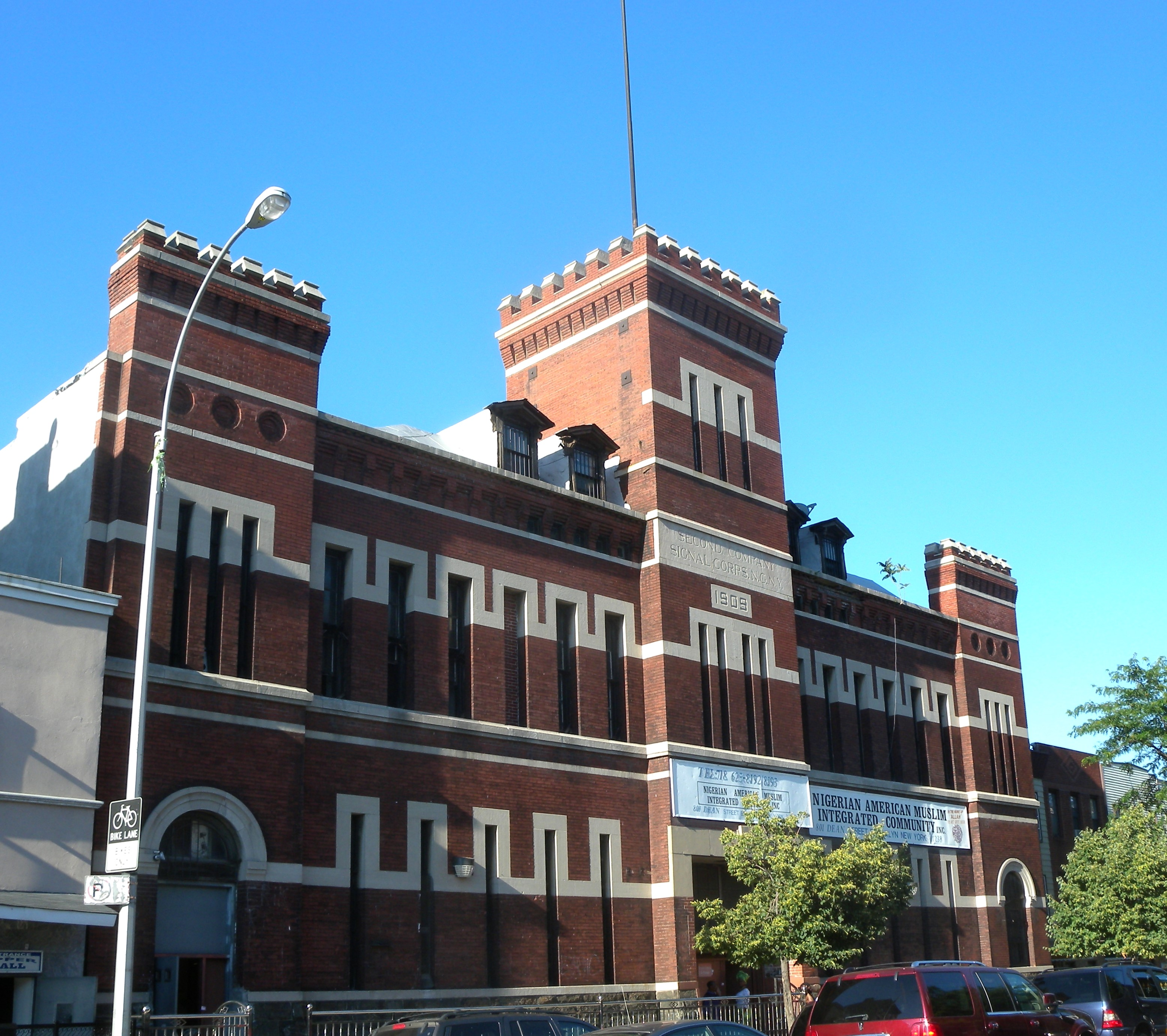
Former Second Company Armory, Brooklyn

The 101st Signal Battalion, headquartered in Yonkers, New York, is an Echelons Above Corps Signal Unit of the New York Army National Guard. It is subordinate to the 53rd Troop Command.

== Mission ==
The mission of the 101st Signal Battalion is to provide and manage communications and information systems support for the command and control of combined arms forces. Signal support includes Network Operations (information assurance, information dissemination management, and network management) and management of the electromagnetic spectrum. Signal support encompasses designing, installing, maintaining, and managing information networks; to include communications links, computers, and other components of local and wide area networks.

Soldiers belonging to the 101st Signal Battalion plan, install, operate, and maintain voice and data communications networks that employ single and multi-channel satellite, tropospheric scatter, terrestrial microwave, switching, messaging, video-teleconferencing, visual information, and other related systems. They also integrate tactical, strategic and sustaining base communications, information processing and management systems into a seamless global information network that supports knowledge dominance for Army, joint and coalition operations.

== Organization ==
- 101st Expeditionary Signal Battalion, in Yonkers
  - Headquarters and Headquarters Company, 101st Expeditionary Signal Battalion, in Yonkers
  - Company A, 101st Expeditionary Signal Battalion, in Peekskill
  - Company B, 101st Expeditionary Signal Battalion, in Orangeburg
  - Company C, 101st Expeditionary Signal Battalion, in Yonkers

== History ==
Organized 6 December 1886 and 29 December 1894, in the New York National Guard at New York and Brooklyn, respectively, as the Provisional Signal Corps of the 1st and 2d Brigades. Following this, the units were restructured and on 11 November 1892, were designated the Provisional Signal and Telegraph Corps of the 1st and 2d Brigades, respectively.

After three years, on 10 January 1895, they were redesignated as the 1st and 2d Signal Corps. Another restructuring occurred on 23 July 1903, becoming the 1st and 2d companies, Signal Corps. Following this, they consolidated on 7 February 1914, as the 1st Battalion, Signal Corps.

Following this, they were called into federal service on 18 June 1916, for service on the Mexican Border. They were redesignated as the 102d Field Signal Battalion and were assigned to the 27th Division on 1 October 1917.

They were demobilized on 31 March 1919 at Camp Upton, New York. After this, they consolidated with the 1st Battalion, Signal Corps, New York Guard. The consolidated unit reorganized into the New York National Guard as the 1st Battalion, Signal Corps; headquarters was recognized federally on 3 May 1921, in New York.

The 1st Battalion, Signal Corps, was redesignated 1 June 1921 as the 101st Signal Battalion. Inducted into federal service 13 January 1941 at home stations, furthermore deactivated 8 December 1945 at Camp Stoneman, California.

The first battalion was reorganized and federally recognized 16 October 1947 with headquarters at Yonkers. After this, they were redesignated on 1 March 1950, as the 101st Signal Battalion. From August 1968 to March 1974, the battalion was commanded by Vincent W. Lanna, who later attained the rank of major general and commanded the 42nd Infantry Division from 1983 to 1985.

The unit was deactivated on 20 August 1994 at Camp Smith, Peekskill, NY, and lay dormant until 1 September 2004, when it was reconstituted into the Army Force structure and into the New York Army National guard.

== Decorations ==
- Meritorious Unit Commendation, Streamer embroidered KOREA.
- Philippine Presidential Unit Citation, Streamer embroidered 17 October 1944 to 4 July 1945.
- Republic of Korea Presidential Unit Citation, Streamer embroidered KOREA.
