= Vincent W. Lanna =

American general (1925–2010)

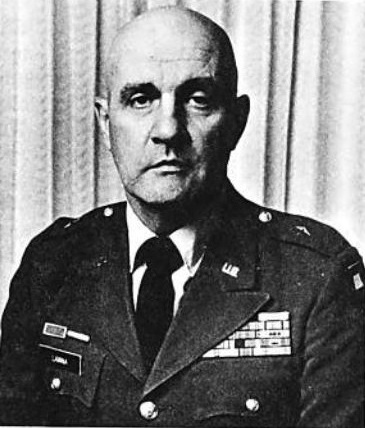
- Lanna as a brigadier general in 1979
- Born: December 23, 1925; Yonkers, New York, US
- Died: August 26, 2010 (aged 84); Yonkers, New York, US
- Burial place: Ferncliff Cemetery and Mausoleum, Hartsdale, New York, US
- Alma mater: St. John's University; St. John's University School of Law; United States Army Command and General Staff College; United States Army War College
- Spouse(s): Mary Repoli; Florence Mozdziak
- Children: 1
- Military career
- Service: United States Marine Corps Reserve; United States Army; United States Army Reserve; New York Army National Guard
- Service years: 1942–1985
- Rank: Major General
- Unit: United States Army Signal Corps
- Commands: Company C, 101st Signal Battalion; Headquarters and Headquarters Company, 101st Signal Battalion; 101st Signal Battalion; 187th Signal Group; Headquarters Troop Command, New York Army National Guard; 42nd Infantry Division
- Conflicts: World War II; Berlin Crisis of 1961
- Awards: Purple Heart; Meritorious Service Medal; New York State Conspicuous Service Cross
- Other work: Attorney

Vincent W. Lanna (23 December 1925 – 26 August 2010) was an American attorney and military officer from Yonkers, New York. A veteran of World War II and the Berlin Crisis of 1961, his career in uniform spanned 1942 to 1985, and he attained the rank of major general. Lanna served in the United States Marine Corps Reserve, United States Army, United States Army Reserve, and New York Army National Guard, and commanded the National Guard's 42nd Infantry Division from 1983 to 1985.

Lanna was raised and educated in Yonkers, and was a graduate of Gorton High School. In 1942, he enlisted in the United States Marine Corps Reserve. During 1942 and 1943, he served in the Asiatic-Pacific campaign. In December 1943, he received a medical discharge, after which he was employed by the United States Army Signal Corps as a defense plant inspector. In May 1945, he enlisted in the United States Army, and he served in Europe with the 14th Infantry Regiment, a unit of the 71st Infantry Division. He was discharged in 1946 and served briefly in the United States Army Reserve.

In 1949, Lanna was commissioned in the New York Army National Guard's 106th Infantry Regiment. Originally qualified as an Infantry officer, he subsequently transferred to the Signal Corps and was assigned as the 106th Infantry's communications staff officer. He attended St. John's University, then enrolled at St. John's University School of Law, from which he graduated with a LL.B. degree in 1952. Lanna was admitted to the bar in 1953 and established a practice that specialized in criminal defense.

As Lanna's military career progressed, he command assignments included a company of the 101st Signal Battalion, the 101st Signal Battalion, the 187th Signal Group, and the New York Army National Guard's Headquarters Troop Command. From 1983 to 1985, he commanded the 42nd Infantry Division. He retired from the military in 1986.

After retiring from the military, Lanna continued to practice law. He served as commander of the New York Guard for several years beginning in 1987. Lanna died in Yonkers on 26 August 2010. He was buried at Ferncliff Cemetery and Mausoleum in Hartsdale, New York.

== Early life ==
Vincent William Lanna was born in Yonkers, New York on 23 December 1925, a son of Ettore and Clelia (Fornelli) Lanna. He grew up and was educated in Yonkers, and was a graduate of Gorton High School. In January 1942, he enlisted in the United States Marine Corps Reserve. In early 1943, he completed basic training at Marine Corps Recruit Depot Parris Island. He then received training in communications as a member of the 1st Telephone Company at Marine Corps Base Camp Lejeune.

Lanna served with the 1st Marine Division in the Asiatic-Pacific campaign during 1942 and 1943 and was wounded during the Guadalcanal campaign. He was discharged medically as a corporal in December 1943, then worked for the United States Army Signal Corps as an inspector of plants that manufactured wartime communications equipment. In May 1945, he enlisted in the United States Army. Assigned to the 14th Infantry Regiment, a unit of the 71st Infantry Division, he served in Europe at the end of the war and during the post-war Occupation of Germany. He was discharged in August 1946 and joined the United States Army Reserve's 77th Infantry Division.

=== Family ===
In September 1945, Lanna married Mary Repoli (1923–2000) of Yonkers. He later married Florence Mozdziak (1925–2013). With his first wife, Lanna was the father of a daughter, Patricia. With his second, he was the stepfather of daughter Michelle (Thomas) Lambusta.

== Start of career ==
After returning to the United States, Lanna attended St. John's University for two years, then began attendance at St. John's University School of Law. He received his LL.B. degree in 1952 and attained admission to the bar in January 1953. Lanna established a practice in Yonkers, where he specialized in criminal defense. In 1971, St. John's converted law degrees including Lanna's from LL.B. to Juris Doctor, in keeping with the American Bar Association's effort to have the law degree recognized as a post-graduate educational accomplishment.

== Continued career ==
In April 1949, Lanna transferred his military membership to the New York Army National Guard and was commissioned as a second lieutenant of Infantry. Assigned as the communications officer on the staff of the 106th Infantry Regiment, Lanna held this position until March 1953, and he received promotion to first lieutenant in August 1950.

=== Military education ===
The professional education Lanna completed during his career included:

- United States Marine Corps Field Communications School, 1942
- United States Army Signal School Officer Career Course, 1964
- United States Army Signal School Field Grade Officer Refresher Course, 1968
- Civil Disturbance Senior Officer Orientation Course, 1969
- United States Army Command and General Staff College, 1972
- Senior Commander Orientation Course, 1973
- Air-Ground Operations Course, 1974
- Senior Officer Preventive Maintenance Course, 1974
- United States Army War College, Senior Reserve Component Officer Course, 1983

== Later career ==
Lanna was promoted to captain in March 1954 and he served as commander of Company C, 101st Signal Battalion from March 1954 to May 1959. From May 1959 to May 1963, Lanna commanded the battalion's Headquarters and Headquarters Company. From September 1961 to August 1962, he served on active duty when the battalion was called up for federal service at Fort Devens, Massachusetts during the Berlin Crisis of 1961. In June 1962, he was among the battalion members chosen to travel to Berlin to observe ongoing military operations, develop a training program for soldiers scheduled to arrive later that year, and become familiar with plans for countering a Soviet attack if one occurred.

In May 1963, Lanna was assigned as the 101st Signal Battalion's plans, operations, and training officer (S3) and he was promoted to major in June. In January 1966, he was assigned as the battalion's executive officer. He was assigned to command of the battalion in August 1968 and promoted to lieutenant colonel in January 1969. Lanna was assigned to command the 187th Signal Group in March 1974, and he was promoted to colonel the following month. He was appointed deputy commander of the New York Army National Guard's Emergency Command Section in December 1977 and promoted to brigadier general in August 1978.

In July 1981, Lanna was promoted to major general and in February 1982 he was assigned to command the New York National Guard's Headquarters Troop Command. In August 1983 he was appointed to command the 42nd Infantry Division. He served until 31 December 1985, when he retired from the military and was succeeded by Bernard G. Ehrlich.

In 1988, Lanna was appointed commander of the New York Guard, the volunteer organization that augments the National Guard. He continued in this position until September 1990, and was succeeded by Enoch H. Williams. Lanna died in Yonkers on 26 August 2010. His burial took place at Ferncliff Cemetery and Mausoleum in Hartsdale, New York.

== Awards ==
=== Federal awards ===
Lanna's federal awards included:

- Purple Heart
- Meritorious Service Medal
- Good Conduct Medal
- American Campaign Medal
- Asiatic–Pacific Campaign Medal
- European–African–Middle Eastern Campaign Medal
- World War II Victory Medal
- Army of Occupation Medal
- Armed Forces Reserve Medal with gold hourglass
- Army Reserve Components Achievement Medal
- Presidential Unit Citation
- Meritorious Unit Commendation

=== State awards ===
Among Lanna's state awards were:

- New York State Conspicuous Service Cross
- New York State Long and Faithful Service Medal (35 years)

== Dates of rank ==
=== United States Marine Corps ===
- Private to Corporal, 17 February 1942 to 23 February 1943

=== United States Army ===
- Private to Staff Sergeant, 21 May 1945 to 22 August 1946

=== United States Army Reserve ===
- Enlisted service, 23 August 1946 to 17 April 1949

=== Army National Guard ===
Lanna's National Guard dates of rank were:

- Second Lieutenant, 18 April 1949
- First Lieutenant, 15 August 1950
- Captain, 24 March 1954
- Major, 5 June 1963
- Lieutenant Colonel, 30 January 1969
- Colonel, 11 April 1974
- Brigadier General, 22 August 1978
- Major General, 30 July 1981
