= Palm Harbor, Florida =

- Census-designated place
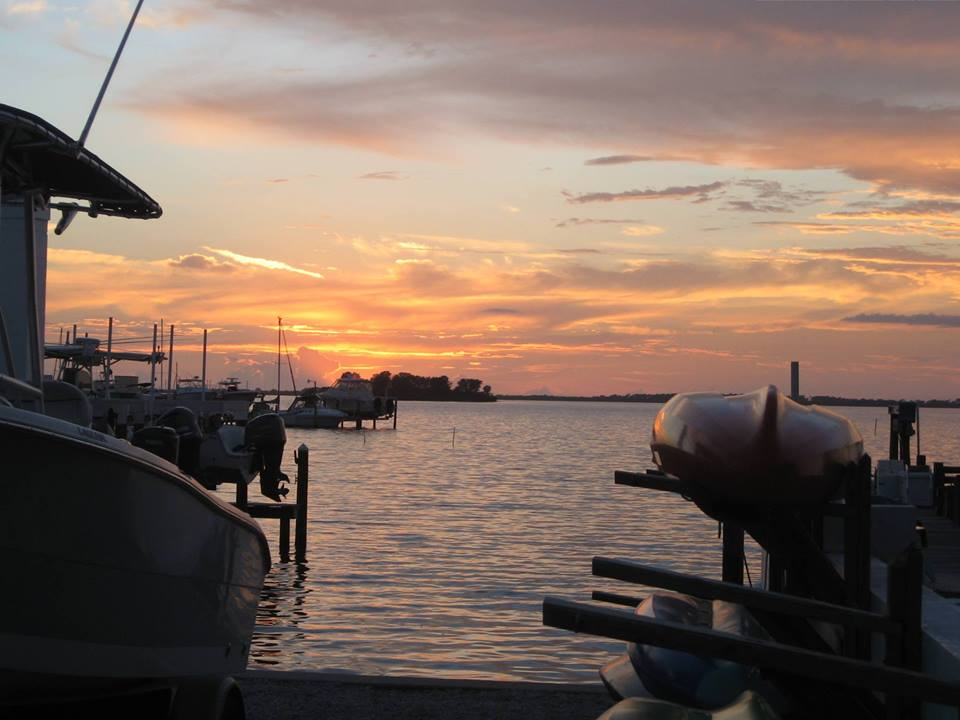
- Sunset in the Ozona neighborhood

- Location in Pinellas County and the state of Florida
- Coordinates: 28°05′05″N 82°44′52″W
- Country: United States
- State: Florida
- County: Pinellas

Area
  - Total: 28.10 sq mi (72.79 km^{2})
  - Land: 17.36 sq mi (44.96 km^{2})
  - Water: 10.75 sq mi (27.83 km^{2})
- Elevation: 26 ft (7.9 m)

Population (2020)
  - Total: 61,366
  - Density: 3,535/sq mi (1,364.9/km^{2})
- Time zone: UTC-5 (Eastern (EST))
  - Summer (DST): UTC-4 (EDT)
- ZIP codes: 34682-34685
- Area code: 727
- FIPS code: 12-54350
- GNIS feature ID: 2403390

Palm Harbor is a census-designated place (CDP) and unincorporated community in Pinellas County, Florida, United States. As of the 2020 census, the CDP had a population of 61,366.

== Culture ==
Palm Harbor is located 22 miles (35 km) north of downtown St. Petersburg and west of Tampa. It is a largely residential community with several concentrations of commerce. Downtown Palm Harbor, north of Tampa Road between U.S. Highway 19 Alternate and Omaha Street hosts many small shops and eateries along with a handful of historic buildings. U.S. Highway 19, a mile or two east of downtown, offers access to higher concentrations of commerce, with an array of national chain restaurants and retailers. One entrance to Innisbrook Resort and Golf Club, a nationally regarded golf course and home of the PGA's Valspar Championship, is found on U.S. 19 just north of Alderman Road.

The historic downtown district of Palm Harbor, at Florida Avenue and Alt. US 19 and CR 1, has numerous festivals and craft fairs. Old Palm Harbor Main Streets, Inc., a 501(c)(3) not-for-profit organization, hosts their signature event the first Friday of every month. "Palm Harbor's First Friday Celebrations" are a popular community event for youngsters and adults alike. There are rides and games for the children, with opportunities to dine on food from the many local restaurants, enjoy local artists and crafters displaying and selling their wares. Annually, the first Sunday in October marks when the "Taste of Palm Harbor" festival is held. The event is presented by the Palm Harbor Junior Women's Club with the proceeds benefiting their "Making a Difference" grants & scholarships program. The Taste of Palm Harbor traditionally offers live music and the tasting of samples from over 20 local restaurants, many of which make seafood their specialty.

== Government ==
Palm Harbor is an unincorporated part of Pinellas County. HB 183 – Town of Palm Harbor/Pinellas County, from 2009, was the most recent local bill that would have scheduled a referendum allowing Palm Harbor voters the opportunity to decide whether they wanted to incorporate, but the bill died in committee. Pinellas County legislators had voted on January 22, 2009, to support a bill allowing voters in Palm Harbor to decide whether they wanted their unincorporated community to become the county's 25th city. It passed over the objections of Pinellas County Commissioner Susan Latvala, who said she was appearing in both her official capacity and as a Palm Harbor resident. The Legislature would first have needed to conduct a feasibility study to make sure that cityhood made fiscal sense.

In 1985, the Pinellas County Board of County Commissioners enacted County Code 85–28, which set into place the Palm Harbor Community Services Agency (PHCSA), a special taxing district to which tax was levied in the form of millage to provide for recreational and library services to the unincorporated community. The PHCSA board is a volunteer panel elected by the voters within the district to oversee the funding of Palm Harbor Library, East Lake Community Library and Palm Harbor Parks & Recreation.

== Recreation ==
Palm Harbor has various recreational amenities. The area is home to John Chesnut Sr. Park, located in the East Lake region, as well as H.S. "Pop" Stansell Park, located to the west of Palm Harbor Boulevard and overlooking St. Joseph's Sound. The Palm Harbor Community Services District also manages several sport complexes in the community: J. Stephen Putnam Park, Palm Field, and Sunderman Recreation Complex. The community activity center is located at 1500 16th Street, managed by the District's parks and recreation department. This facility was originally constructed by Pinellas County in the late 1990s as a senior recreation facility, however lacked the funding to remain open and available to the community. The District received the property in 2004, and started youth, teen and adult programs, youth summer camps and community services.

Palm Harbor is also the home to the Rheba Sutton White Chapel. This historic facility, which was under Pinellas County ownership previously, lacked the funding to keep its doors open and was given to the Palm Harbor Community Services District in November 2012. Now managed by the District's parks and recreation department, the chapel was completely restored and is the site for many banquets, weddings and community special events. Harbor Hall, the banquet facility built next to the chapel, also serves as a banquet and recreational space.

== Palm Harbor Library ==
=== Library history ===
Palm Harbor Library opened April 1, 1978, funded by a Municipal Service Taxing Unit (MSTU), and is the only library in the state of Florida funded by a MSTU. Ozona Elementary School teacher, Jeanette Malouf, noted that students did not have a library close enough to their homes to borrow books. The closest libraries at the time were the Dunedin Library and Tarpon Springs Library, both of which charged fees to members not living in their respective cities. Jeanette Malouf was the Vice President of the Palm Harbor Civic Club, which donated $400 as start-up for funding of the library. With donated books, and building supplies by various community members, the first floor of a home on 1205 Omaha Ave. donated by Bill Honey was renovated into a small library.

The Palm Harbor Library ran entirely on volunteers, which formed the group, the Palm Harbor Friends of the Library Inc. on December 18, 1979. The Palm Harbor Friends of the Library elected officials in 1980, where Jeanette Malouf was named director of the library. The library continued to run on community donations and fundraisers and their semi-annual book sales. With 10,000 volumes, the library moved to historical Palm Harbor Methodist Church on 12th Street in Old Palm Harbor in December 1980. By 1982, the library volumes had doubled to 20,000 and served over 2,000 families within the community, and also acquired a new service of accessibility through the donation of a large-print section in memory of Lea Gibbons. As the library continued to grow, it needed more space. The Florida State Library opened up a grant for public libraries of $200,000 to be included 1984–85 budget. Palm Harbor Library encountered two issues in qualification for the grant; the first was that it could only be made to a government agency (and at the time Palm Harbor was unincorporated), but Pinellas County Administrator Fred Marquis supported their application. The second issue was that the community must match the grant of $200,000, which Pinellas County donated 8 acres of 6th Street, counting for $100,000, and the rest must be raised. Ultimately, the grant was vetoed by Governor Graham on June 30, 1983, due to funding and denied tax raises by legislation.

Through extensive fundraising and membership fees, Malouf and the Palm Harbor Friends of the Library continued work towards the goal of building the library. In February 1985, Senator Curt Kiser proposed a bill to create a Special District Status for the Palm Harbor Fire District, which was approved in June. This allowed Palm Harbor to tax themselves for various services such as a library, which led to the development of the MSTU. In order to buy land for the Palm Harbor Library, a proposal for tax-free bonds was approved by the PHCSA and the County Commissioner approved the purchase of the site on Nebraska Avenue as the site for the Palm Harbor Library. The Palm Harbor Library officially opened at its new and current location on Nebraska Avenue on July 5, 1988.

== Geography ==
According to the United States Census Bureau, the CDP has a total area of 26.6 square miles (68.9 km^{2}), of which 17.4 square miles (45.0 km^{2}) is land, and 9.2 square miles (23.9 km^{2}), comprising 34.67%, is water.

Palm Harbor has a unique "hilly" geography which is uncommon in Florida.

== History ==
The area that is now Palm Harbor was largely uninhabited until settlers began arriving in the 1860s. The area became known as "Curlew", with the Curlew Pioneer Cemetery, established in 1869, and the Curlew Methodist Church. A post office named "Bay St. Joseph" opened in 1878. In 1881, Henry B. Plant, with the help of his 2nd cousin, Reino Milvid, opened the San Marino Hotel in what later became Palm Harbor in 1885. The Gulf View Hotel also opened around that time. The Sutherland Improvement Company acquired land in the Curlew/Bay St. Joseph area and developed it into the settlement of Sutherland. In 1888 the Sutherland Post Office opened. The Orange Belt Railway reached Sutherland in 1890.

The name was changed to Palm Harbor in 1925. Sutherland boasted two beautiful hotels, the larger one becoming Southern College in 1902. It sat high on the bluff overlooking Sutherland Bayou and the Gulf of Mexico. Sutherland was thought to be named after the Duke of Sutherland, who visited these parts after landing at Tarpon Springs in 1887. Local pioneers dismiss this coincidence, pointing out that the name Sutherland is a shortening of Southern Land and Development Company, the group which originally platted the community in 1888.

Palm Harbor was once home to the Florida State Headquarters of the Ku Klux Klan when Donald Kersey, who was not a member of the Klan, allowed the organization to use his 13-acre property just north of Tampa Road on US-19 beginning in 1977. Kersey allowed the KKK to use his land when a portion of it was rezoned from commercial to residential which cost him a substantial amount of money. The KKK told Kersey that they needed to go underground to not gain any attention from authorities but that his land would be a great place to try to recruit people into the organization. Kersey stated that he told the zoning commission that he would make them pay for their zoning decisions which ended up bringing the Klan to the small unincorporated town. The land was sold in 2006 with a large strip mall built on it with a subdivision behind that structure. While Kersey got his revenge on the zoning committee with his actions, the locals did resist since the building was burned down on four occasions and the Palm Harbor Chamber of Commerce passed a resolution condemning the group and the actions of Mr. Kersey. Once his actions were known to locals, his house was set ablaze when someone tried to burn the KKK buildings down on the property. Citizens of Palm Harbor also resisted the Klan's relocation. Palm State Bank President Frank S. Weaner, a member of the Jewish community, waged a long campaign against the presence of the Klan in Palm Harbor. He attempted to foster a dialogue between himself and the Florida Grand Dragon Jack Gregory. While these discussions did slowly change the viewpoint of Gregory, they did little to dislodge the group from the community. Weaner later debated Grand Wizard David Duke national head of the KKK, before a nationally publicized rally, and proceeded to inform him that much of the Klan's literature about the Jewish people was wrong. Eventually, the land was sold in 2006 and the Klan's activity began to wane in the 1990s.

== Demographics ==
Historical population
Census	Pop.	Note	%±
1980	5,215		—
1990	50,256		863.7%
2000	59,248		17.9%
2010	57,439		−3.1%
2020	61,366		6.8%

=== Racial and ethnic composition ===
Palm Harbor racial composition (Hispanics excluded from racial categories) (NH = Non-Hispanic)
Race	Pop 2010	Pop 2020	% 2010	% 2020
White (NH)	51,091	51,669	88.95%	84.20%
Black or African American (NH)	1,044	1,013	1.82%	1.65%
Native American or Alaska Native (NH)	103	85	0.18%	0.14%
Asian (NH)	906	1,257	1.58%	2.05%
Pacific Islander or Native Hawaiian (NH)	20	24	0.03%	0.04%
Some other race (NH)	84	210	0.15%	0.34%
Two or more races/Multiracial (NH)	784	2,351	1.36%	3.83%
Hispanic or Latino (any race)	3,407	4,757	5.93%	7.75%
Total	57,439	61,366	100.00%	100.00%

=== 2020 census ===
As of the 2020 census, Palm Harbor had a population of 61,366. The median age was 51.2 years. 16.5% of residents were under the age of 18 and 27.9% of residents were 65 years of age or older. For every 100 females there were 89.2 males, and for every 100 females age 18 and over there were 86.4 males age 18 and over.

100.0% of residents lived in urban areas, while 0.0% lived in rural areas.

There were 27,662 households in Palm Harbor, of which 21.5% had children under the age of 18 living in them. Of all households, 47.9% were married-couple households, 16.2% were households with a male householder and no spouse or partner present, and 29.5% were households with a female householder and no spouse or partner present. About 31.9% of all households were made up of individuals and 17.7% had someone living alone who was 65 years of age or older. There were 16,344 families in the CDP.

There were 31,238 housing units, of which 11.4% were vacant. The homeowner vacancy rate was 1.5% and the rental vacancy rate was 9.9%.

Racial composition as of the 2020 census
Race	Number	Percent
White	52,977	86.3%
Black or African American	1,090	1.8%
American Indian and Alaska Native	137	0.2%
Asian	1,285	2.1%
Native Hawaiian and Other Pacific Islander	26	0.0%
Some other race	1,059	1.7%
Two or more races	4,792	7.8%
Hispanic or Latino (of any race)	4,757	7.8%

=== 2010 census ===
As of the 2010 United States census, there were 57,439 people, 25,779 households, and 15,909 families residing in the CDP.

=== 2000 census ===
As of the census of 2000, there were 59,248 people, 25,461 households, and 16,906 families residing in the CDP. The population density was 1,276.6/km^{2} (3,306/mi^{2}). There were 28,044 housing units at an average density of 604.2/km^{2} (1,565/mi^{2}). The racial makeup of the CDP was 95.83% White, 0.97% African American, 0.19% Native American, 1.28% Asian, 0.02% Pacific Islander, 0.60% from other races, and 1.10% from two or more races. Hispanic or Latino of any race were 3.45% of the population.

In 2000, there were 25,461 households, out of which 27.0% had children under the age of 18 living with them, 55.3% were married couples living together, 8.5% had a female householder with no husband present, and 33.6% were non-families. 28.1% of all households were made up of individuals, and 14.2% had someone living alone who was 65 years of age or older. The average household size was 2.28 and the average family size was 2.79.

In 2000, in the CDP, the population was spread out, with 20.8% under the age of 18, 5.1% from 18 to 24, 27.1% from 25 to 44, 23.7% from 45 to 64, and 23.4% who were 65 years of age or older. The median age was 43 years. For every 100 females, there were 88.7 males. For every 100 females age 18 and over, there were 85.5 males.

In 2000, the median income for a household in the CDP was $45,404, and the median income for a family was $52,925. Males had a median income of $41,003 versus $29,287 for females. The per capita income for the CDP was $26,470. About 4.3% of families and 5.5% of the population were considered below the poverty line, including 5.2% of those under age 18 and 6.5% of those age 65 or over.

== Notable people ==
- Gus Bilirakis, congressman serving as the U.S. representative for Florida's 12th congressional district since 2013
- Michael Bilirakis, congressman who lived in Palm Harbor during his time in office
- Jack A. James Jr. (born 1968), US Army major general
- Ted Larsen, pro football offensive lineman
- Mike Rinder (1955-2025), former executive for and later critic of the Church of Scientology.
- Richie Scheinblum (1942–2021), Major League Baseball All Star outfielder
- Ben Sweat, left-back for MLS club New England Revolution
- Henry Zebrowski, comedian and actor

== See also ==
- Palm Harbor Fire Rescue
- Joseph L. Carwise Middle School
- Palm Harbor Middle School
- Palm Harbor University High School
