= Jack A. James Jr. =

US Army major general

Jack A. James
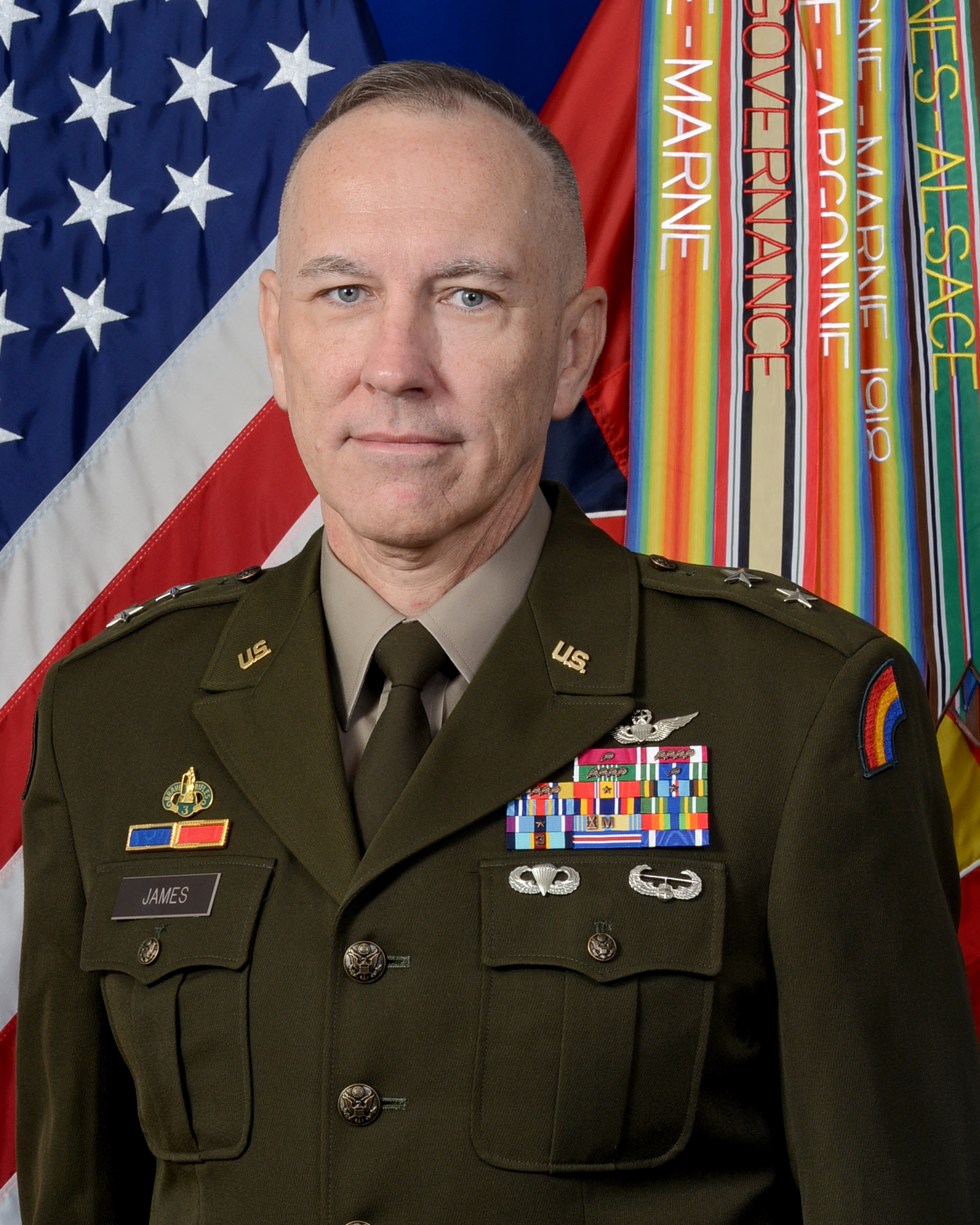
- Born: 1968 (age 57–58); Paterson, New Jersey, US
- Education: United States Military Academy; New York University; United States Army Command and General Staff College; United States Army War College
- Spouse(s): Annette Dalley (m. 1992–1998) Lesia R. Koropey (m. 2006)
- Children: 3
- Military career
- Service: United States Army; New York Army National Guard
- Service years: 1992–Present
- Rank: Major General
- Unit: United States Army Aviation Branch
- Commands: 42nd Infantry Division; 53rd Troop Command; 42nd Combat Aviation Brigade; 642nd Aviation Support Battalion; R Troop, 3rd Armored Cavalry Regiment
- Conflicts: Operation Uphold Democracy; Stabilization Force (SFOR); Operation Enduring Freedom; Operation Epic Fury
- Awards: Legion of Merit (2); Meritorious Service Medal (5); Army Commendation Medal (5); Army Achievement Medal (2); Complete list
- Other work: Vice President, New York Life Insurance Company

Jack A. James (born 1968) is a career officer in the United States Army. A veteran of the United States Army and New York Army National Guard, in September 2024 he was promoted to major general and appointed to command the 42nd Infantry Division. In October 2026 he was assigned as deputy commander of the United States Army Transformation and Training Command. James took part in Operation Uphold Democracy in Haiti, and Stabilization Force (SFOR) duties in Bosnia and Herzegovina, in addition to taking part in Operation Enduring Freedom. His awards and decorations include the Legion of Merit with oak leaf cluster, Meritorious Service Medal with four oak leaf clusters, Army Commendation Medal with four oak leaf clusters, and Army Achievement Medal with oak leaf cluster.

A native of Paterson, New Jersey, James was raised in New Jersey and graduated from the United States Military Academy at West Point in 1992 with a bachelor of science degree in foreign affairs. After becoming qualified as an army aviator in 1993, he served on active duty in Hawaii and Colorado and advanced from second lieutenant to captain. During his time on active duty, James served in Haiti during Operation Uphold Democracy and Bosnia and Herzegovina as part of the Stabilization Force (SFOR). After leaving the regular army in 2001, he became a member of the New York Army National Guard while pursuing a civilian career as an executive with the New York Life Insurance Company. In 2003, he received a master of business administration degree from New York University.

In the National Guard, James served in command and staff assignments including commander of the 642nd Aviation Support Battalion in Kuwait during Operation Enduring Freedom. In 2015, he graduated from the United States Army War College with a master of science degree in strategic studies. He was promoted to brigadier general in 2019, and served as New York's assistant adjutant general for army while also commanding the 53rd Troop Command. He served as the 42nd Infantry Division's assistant division commander for maneuver from 2021 to 2023, and again commanded the 53rd Troop Command from 2023 to 2024. In September 2024, he was appointed to command the 42nd Infantry Division and received promotion to major general. After leading the Task Force Spartan mission in the Middle East, in October 2026 James was appointed deputy commander of the Transformation and Training Command.

== Early life ==
Jack Alan James was born in Paterson, New Jersey in 1968, the son of Jack A. James Sr. and Sheila (Danckwerth) James. He was raised and educated in New Jersey, and graduated from Wayne Valley High School in 1987. In 1988, he began attendance at the United States Military Academy (West Point). He graduated in 1992 with a bachelor of science degree in foreign affairs and received his commission as a second lieutenant in the Aviation Branch.

== Start of career ==
After receiving his commission, James attended the Aviation Officer Basic Course at Fort Rucker, Alabama from June 1992 to July 1993. From June 1993 to October 1994, he was assigned as executive officer, of Company C, 2nd Aviation Regiment at Camp Stanley, South Korea. In October 1994, he was assigned as assistant plans, operations and training officer (Assistant S-3) for 1st Battalion, 25th Aviation Regiment at Wheeler Army Airfield, Hawaii, where he remained until April 1995, including deployment to Haiti for Operation Uphold Democracy. From April 1995 to September 1996, he was a platoon leader with Company C, 1st Battalion, 25th Aviation Regiment. He next served as logistics staff officer (S-4) for 1st Battalion, 25th Aviation Regiment, a position he held from September 1996 to July 1997.

James returned to Fort Rucker in July 1997 to attend the Aviation Officer Advanced Course. After his May 1998 graduation, he remained at Fort Rucker as a student in the AH-64 helicopter Qualification Course. After graduating in August 1998, he was assigned to the 3rd Armored Cavalry Regiment at Fort Carson, Colorado, where he served as the 4th Squadron's assistant S-3. In 1998, James also graduated from the United States Army Command and General Staff College's Combined Arms and Services Staff School at Fort Leavenworth, Kansas. From October 1999 to October 2001, he commanded Troop R, 4th Squadron, 3rd Armored Cavalry Regiment, including deployment to Bosnia and Herzegovina for Stabilization Force (SFOR) duties. James then left the regular army, and his break in service lasted until June 2002, when he joined the New York Army National Guard.

== Continued career ==
From June 2002 to March 2003, James served as Intelligence and Operations staff officer (S-2/3) for the 642nd Aviation Support Battalion in Brooklyn. In 2003, he graduated from New York University with a master of business administration degree in finance and management. James served as executive officer of 3rd Battalion, 142nd Aviation Regiment in Latham from April 2003 to March 2007. In 2005, he completed the United States Army Command and General Staff College course. James served on temporary active duty during the National Guard's 2005 response to Hurricane Katrina. While serving in the National Guard, he pursued a civilian career in business and finance, and became a vice president of the New York Life Insurance Company.

From April 2007 to November 2011, he served as S-3 of the 42nd Combat Aviation Brigade in Latham. In 2008, he graduated from the United States Air Force's Air War College course. He next assumed command of the 642nd Aviation Support Battalion in Rochester, which he led from November 2011 to November 2014, including temporary active duty during the National Guard's 2012 response to Hurricane Sandy, as well as deployment to Kuwait for Operation Enduring Freedom. James commanded the 42nd Combat Aviation Brigade in Latham from November 2014 to June 2019. In 2015, he graduated from the United States Army War College as a Distinguished Graduate with a master of science degree in strategic studies.

== Career as general officer ==
In 2019, James was promoted to brigadier general and assigned as the New York National Guard's assistant adjutant general for army and commander of the 53rd Troop Command in Cortland Manor. From October 2021 to November 2023, he was assistant division commander for maneuver at the 42nd Infantry Division headquarters in Troy. In December 2023, he was again assigned as assistant adjutant general and commander of the 53rd Troop Command. In September 2024, James was promoted to major general and assigned to command the 42nd Infantry Division. The division held a formal change of command ceremony at Fort Indiantown Gap, Pennsylvania in mid-November.

During James's division command, he led Task Force Spartan, the Army’s 10,000 soldier Middle East stabilization force during 2025 and 2026. When the 2026 Iran war (Operation Epic Fury) launched in February, James led the Task Force Spartan transition into a warfighting role. James returned to the United States in June 2026, and in October he was succeeded as 42nd Division commander by Brigadier General Richard P. Cipro. James then began an assignment as deputy commander for Reserve and National Guard affairs at the army's Transformation and Training Command (T2COM).

The courses James completed after becoming a general officer include the Joint Task Force Commanders Course (2021), Dual Status Commander's Course (2022), and Senior Leader Development Seminar (Army Strategic Education Program Basic [ASEP-B]) (2022). He is a master aviator, and is qualified on the AH-64A, AH-1F, UH-60A/L, UH-1H, and UH-72 aircraft.

James is a resident of Palm Harbor, Florida. He is a German language speaker, and his professional memberships include the Army Aviation Association of America, Military Association of New York, Association of the United States Army, and Rainbow Division Veterans Foundation. James is a recipient of the Army Aviation Association's Order of Saint Michael (Silver).

== Effective dates of promotion ==
James's effective dates of promotion are:

- Major General, 1 September 2024
- Brigadier General, 10 June 2019
- Colonel, 12 May 2015
- Lieutenant Colonel, 1 April 2008
- Major, 2 October 2003
- Captain, 1 June 1996
- First Lieutenant, 30 May 1994
- Second Lieutenant, 30 May 1992

== Awards ==
James' awards include:

- Legion of Merit with 1 Bronze oak leaf cluster
- Meritorious Service Medal with 4 Bronze oak leaf clusters
- Army Commendation Medal with 4 Bronze oak leaf clusters
- Army Achievement Medal with 1 Bronze Oak Leaf Cluster
- Army Reserve Components Achievement Medal with 4 Bronze oak leaf clusters
- National Defense Service Medal with Bronze service star
- Armed Forces Expeditionary Medal with Bronze service star
- Global War on Terrorism Expeditionary Medal
- Global War on Terrorism Service Medal
- Korean Defense Service Medal
- Humanitarian Service Medal with Bronze service star
- Armed Forces Reserve Medal with Bronze hourglass and "M" device
- Army Service Ribbon
- Army Overseas Service Ribbon with Numeral "3"
- Army Reserve Components Overseas Training Ribbon
- North Atlantic Treaty Organization Medal
- New York State Long and Faithful Service Medal with 2 Silver Shields
- New York State Conspicuous Service Cross
- Humane Service to New York State Medal
- Louisiana Emergency Service Medal
- Mississippi Emergency Service Medal
- Master Army Aviator Badge
- Parachutist Badge
- Air Assault Badge
