= 42nd Combat Aviation Brigade =

US military unit

Shoulder Sleeve Insignia of 42nd Infantry Division, higher headquarters of the Combat Aviation Brigade

The Combat Aviation Brigade, 42nd Infantry Division is a subordinate command of the 42nd Infantry Division. Once contained solely within New York, force reductions and reorganizations have resulted in units from several different states making up the brigade.

== Structure ==
Source DMNA.

- Headquarters and Headquarters Company (HHC), Latham, NY
- 3rd Battalion, 142nd Aviation Regiment, Ronkonkoma, NY
  - Company A, Latham, NY
  - Company B, Ronkonkoma, NY
  - Company D, Latham, NY
  - Company E, Farmingdale, NY
    - Detachment 2, Company A, 1st Security & Support Battalion, 224th Aviation Regiment (S&S)
    - Detachment 3, Company E, 3rd Battalion, 142nd Aviation Regiment
- 642nd Aviation Support Battalion (642nd ASB), Rochester, NY
  - HHC, Rochester, NY
    - Detachment 2, HHC 3rd Battalion, 126th Aviation Regiment (3-126th Aviation Battalion) (TOC) at Rochester
    - Detachment 1, Company B, 3-126th Aviation Battalion (heavy lift) at Rochester
    - Detachment 2, Company D, 3-126th Aviation Battalion (maintenance) at Rochester
    - Detachment 2, Company E, 3-126th Aviation Battalion (support) at Rochester
  - Company A, Dunkirk, NY
    - Detachment 1 at Olean, NY
  - Company B, Ronkonkoma, NY
  - Company C, Brooklyn, NY
  - C Company 1st General Support Aviation Battalion, 171st Aviation Regiment (C-1-171st GSAB) at Rochester
    - Detachment 2, Headquarters and Headquarters Company (2-HHC), 1-171st GSAB at Rochester
    - Company C, 1-171st GSAB at Rochester
    - Detachment 2, Company D, 1-171st GSAB at Rochester
    - Detachment 1, Company E, 1-171st GSAB

== Activation and history ==
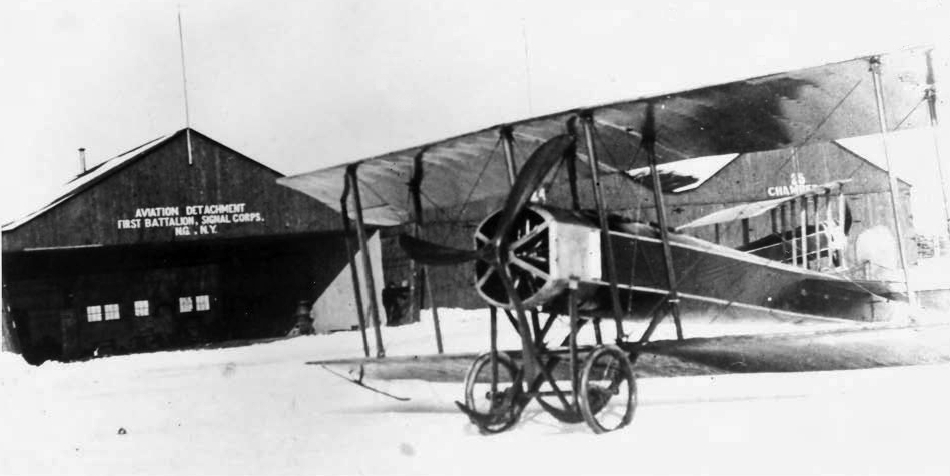
Gallaudet Tractor biplane rented by Aviation Detachment, 1st Battalion, Signal Corps, New York National Guard, 1915.

The New York National Guard played an active role in Army aviation from the early 1900s through the end of World War II. The Combat Aviation Brigade, 42d Infantry Division traces its history from 1947 when the post-World War II reorganization of the United States military created the United States Air Force as an entity separate from the Army. This reorganization also led to the creation of the Air National Guard.

In 1947 the New York Army National Guard fielded a fixed-wing aviation detachment of L-19 "Bird Dogs" assigned to Miller Field on Staten Island. This detachment and aircraft from the II Corps and 101st Armored Cavalry Regiment were organized as the 42d Aviation Company at Huntington Station, Long Island in 1959.

In 1963, the 42d Division's aviation units were reorganized as the 42d Aviation Battalion, based at Zahn's Airport, Long Island. The battalion was equipped with O-1A Bird Dog and U-6 Beaver fixed-wing aircraft.

The battalion expanded as the United States Army began fielding helicopters, including the creation of "lettered" subordinate companies (Company A, 42d Aviation Battalion, and so on) and companies from other states. In 1968 the battalion received OH-13s and OH-23s. In 1971, Company A (Niagara Falls) and Company B (Long Island NY) received Bell H-13, UH-1 and OH-6 helicopters. These companies consisted mainly of "lift" capacity and fielded the Delta and Hotel model UH-1, but each company had "Attack" platoons that flew "Charlie" and "Mike" model gunships.

By 1985 the 42d Aviation Battalion was fielding the Bell AH-1 Cobra and Hughes OH-6 Cayuse, as well as the Bell UH-1 Iroquois.

In October 1986 another reorganization resulted in the creation of the Aviation Brigade, 42d Infantry Division, and the expansion of the 42nd Aviation Battalion into two. The 1st Battalion, 142nd Aviation Regiment (Attack) headquartered in Latham, was established in 1989, and the 2d Battalion, 142nd Aviation Regiment (Assault) in Niagara Falls, New York in 1991.

In 1995 the Army’s "Aviation Restructuring Initiative" again reorganized the Aviation Brigade. 2-142d Aviation was inactivated, moved to Rochester as the redesignated as 1-142d, and received the AH-1 ‘F’ model helicopter. 1-142d in Latham was re-flagged as the 3d Battalion, 142d Aviation Regiment (Assault), and received the UH-60 ‘Blackhawk’ helicopter.

== Operation Iraqi Freedom ==
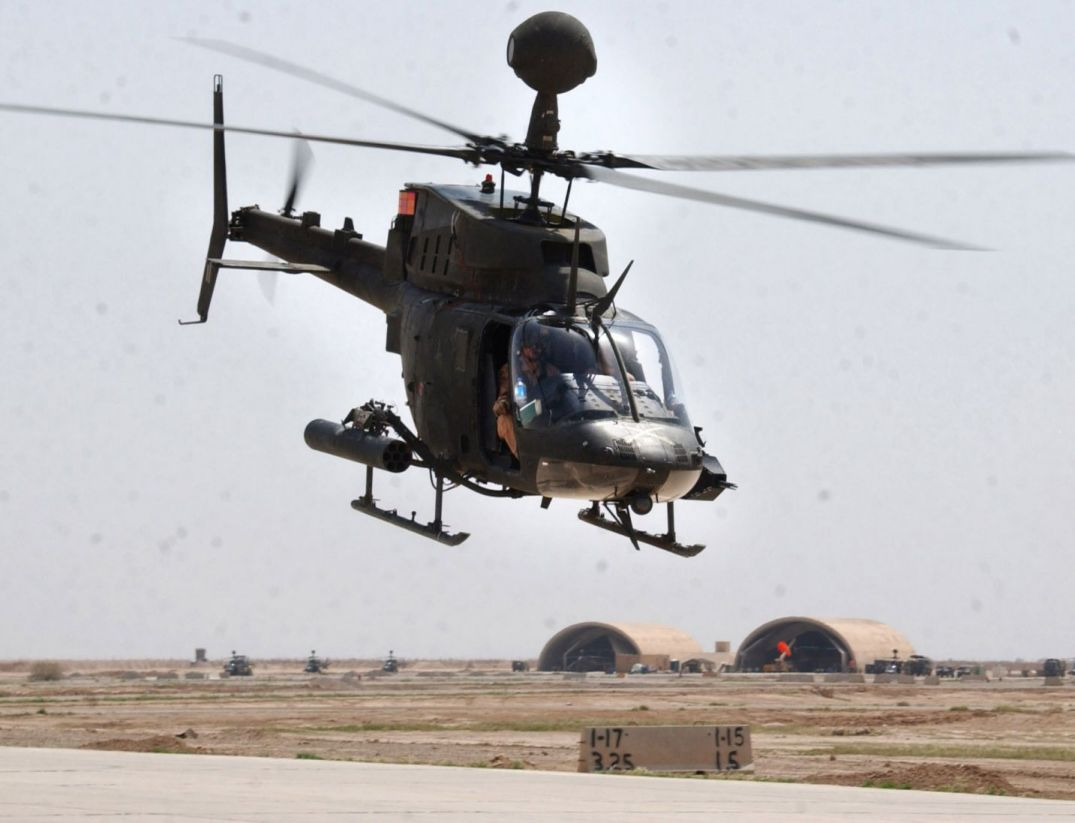
OH-58D from the 1st Squadron, 17th Cavalry Regiment returns to Forward Operating Base Mackenzie, Iraq, 2005.

The Aviation Brigade headquarters deployed to Iraq as part of the 42d Division (Task Force Liberty) in May, 2004 and returned in November, 2005. Units subordinate to the Aviation Brigade in Iraq included:

- Headquarters and Headquarters Company, Aviation Brigade, 42d Infantry Division
- 642d Aviation Support Battalion
- 1st Battalion, 150th Aviation Regiment (General Support), NJ ARNG
- 1st Battalion, 140th Aviation Regiment (General Support), CA ARNG
- 8th Battalion, 229th Aviation Regiment (Attack), USAR
- 1st Squadron, 17th Cavalry Regiment, 82nd Airborne Division.

== Post Iraqi Freedom ==
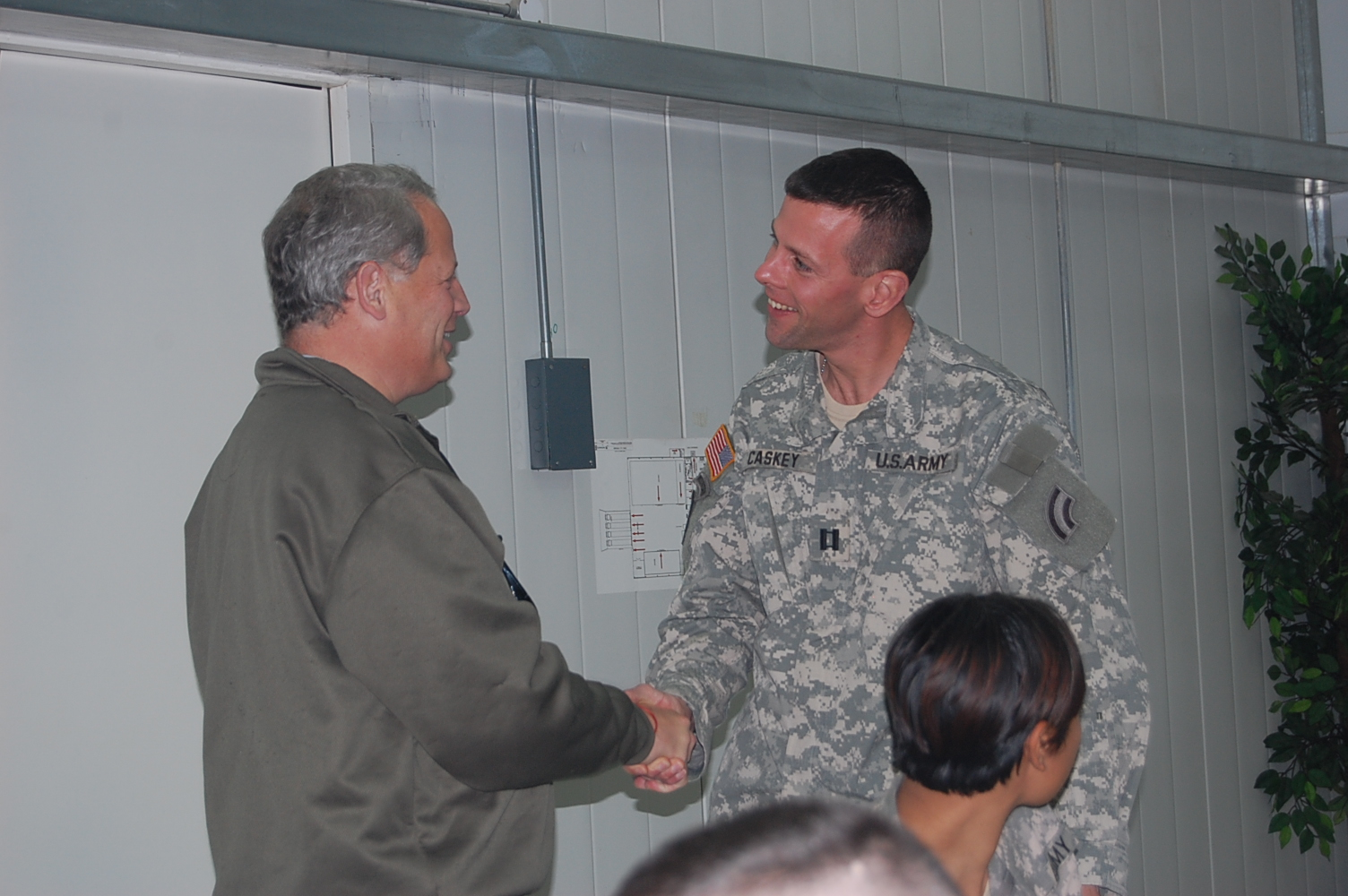
Congressman Steve Israel greets Brian S. Caskey (3-142 Aviation) during Israel's 2008 visit to Iraq.

The 2005 modular reorganization of Army combat divisions included the redesignation from "Aviation Brigade" to "Combat Aviation Brigade" (CAB). In 2006, the headquarters of the Combat Aviation Brigade, 42d Infantry Division was relocated to Latham, New York.

As part of planned force reductions following military operations in Iraq and Afghanistan, the 42nd Infantry Division has reconfigured and redistributed subordinate units. As of 2013, the Combat Aviation Brigade has units in eleven states. Units based in New York include: Dunkirk; Jamestown; Olean; Rochester; Latham; Brooklyn; Patchogue; and Ronkonkoma.

New York Army National Guard Aviation units and individual volunteers have also continued to serve overseas in Iraq, Afghanistan, and elsewhere. In 2013, the Combat Aviation Brigade was deployed in support of Operation Enduring Freedom under the command of Brigadier General Jack A. James Jr.

Note: While commonly referred to as the 42nd Combat Aviation Brigade, the U.S. Army Center of Military History confirms that its correct designation is Combat Aviation Brigade, 42nd Infantry Division.
