= 204th Engineer Battalion (United States) =

204th Engineer Battalion (Combat)(Heavy)
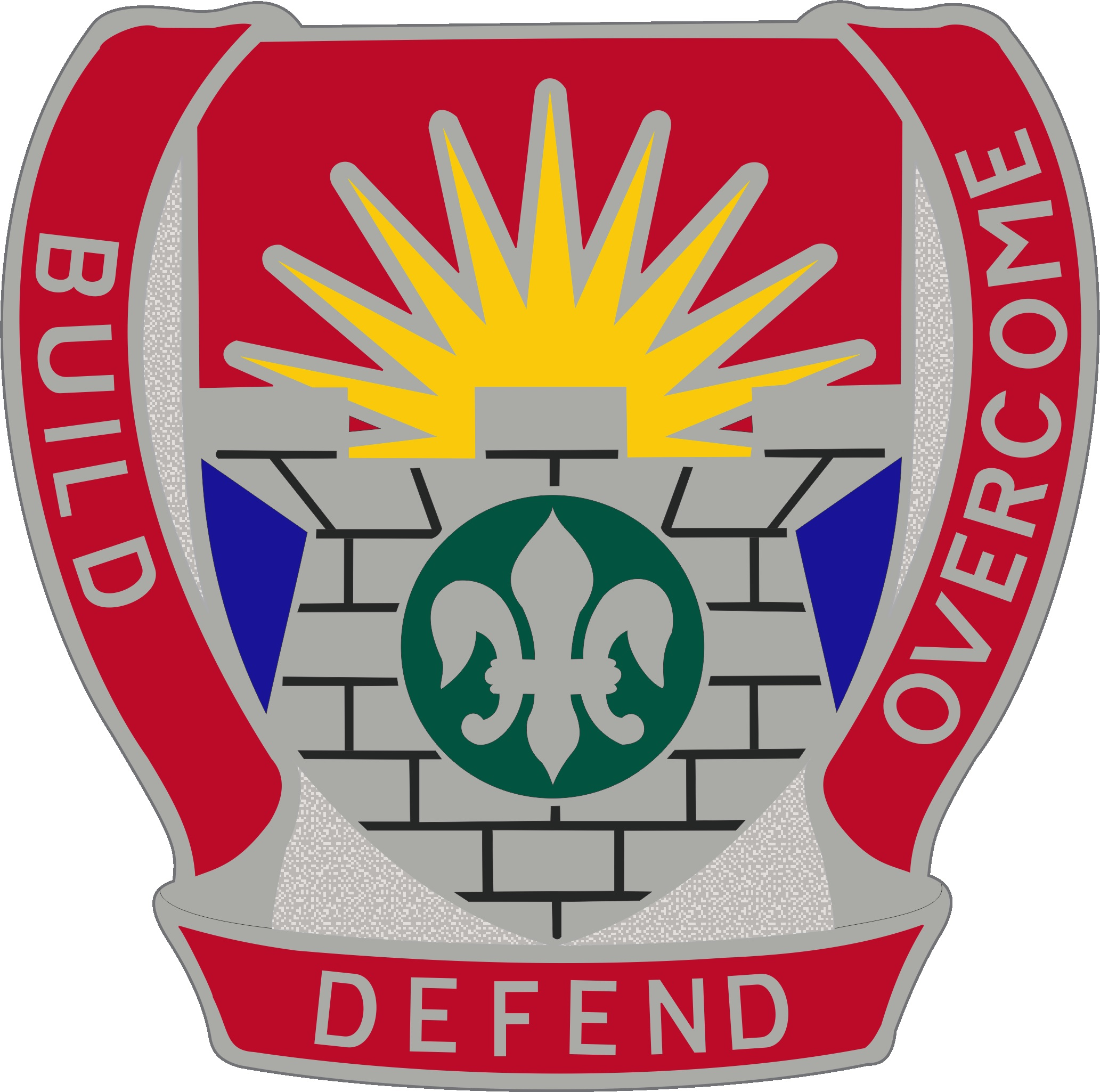
- 204 Eng Bn unit insignia
- Country: United States
- Branch: U.S. Army National Guard (New York)
- Type: Combat Heavy Engineers
- Mottos: Build, Defend, Overcome

Commanders
- Commander: LTC Nicholas Whaley
- CSM: CSM Jay Symonds

The 204th Engineer Battalion, United States Army Corps of Engineers, was constituted on 1 December 1967 in the New York Army National Guard. It was organized on 1 February 1968 from existing units in south-central New York. The headquarters of the unit was established in Binghamton, New York.

== History ==
The units which formed the battalion brought with them the campaign credits and unit awards earned in previous service to the United States. The Service Company has seven campaign credits for World War I and three credits for service in the Pacific during World War II. Company A has three campaign credits for World War I and another three for service in World War II. Company B has three World War I credits and nine World War II credits. Of the latter, five are for service in Europe and four are for service in the Pacific. The company also received a Meritorious Unit Commendation and a Philippine Presidential Unit Citation. Company C has one American Civil War credit, three World War I credits, and 10 World War II credits. Five of these are based on service of predecessor units in Europe and the other five are for service in the Pacific. In addition, Company C earned a Presidential Unit Citation for Saipan and a French Croix de Guerre with Silver Star for World War I service in the Meuse-Argonne. The unit was twice cited in the Order of the Day of the Belgian Army.

== Twenty-first century ==
The 204th Engineer Battalion offered assistance to New York following the September 11 terrorist attacks on the World Trade Center.

Elements of the battalion have been activated for both the War in Afghanistan (2001-2021) (Operation Enduring Freedom) and the U.S. phase of the Iraq War (2003–2011) (Operation Iraqi Freedom). Additionally, the battalion has been activated numerous times for state service including response to the 2006 Southern Tier floods, and the February 2007 snow storms in Oswego, NY. Among many distinguished members of the 204th Engineer Battalion are recent retiree's First Sergeant James Zemanick (HSC 1SG), MSG Jeffrey Mancuso (204 En Bn Operations Sergeant), SFC Susanna Stacy (Assistant Battalion Operations Sergeant) and SSG Paul Musa Jr (HSC Recon NCO). MSG Mancuso and SSG Musa both have multiple combat tours. MSG Mancuso was awarded the Bronze Star for service with the NY STT (3/2 Stryker Brigade Combat Team) in Afghanistan. SFC Stacy is OEF veteran who served in Afghanistan. 1SG Zemanick served in Operation Desert Shield/Storm.

== Organization ==
- 204th Engineer Battalion, in Binghamton
  - Headquarters and Headquarters Company, 204th Engineer Battalion, in Binghamton
  - Forward Support Company, 204th Engineer Battalion, in Binghamton
  - 152nd Engineer Company (Engineer Support Company), in Buffalo
  - 204th Engineer Platoon (Quarry), in Binghamton
  - 827th Engineer Company (Engineer Construction Company), in Horseheads
    - Detachment 1, 827th Engineer Company (Engineer Construction Company), in Walton
  - 1156th Engineer Company (Vertical Construction Company), at Camp Smith
    - Detachment 1, 1156th Engineer Company (Vertical Construction Company), in Kingston
