= 27th Infantry Brigade Combat Team =

- Shoulder sleeve insignia
- Active: 1 April 1986–1 August 2007 (27th Infantry Bge.); 1 August 2007–present (27th IBCT)
- Country: United States
- Allegiance: New York Army National Guard
- Branch: United States Army National Guard
- Type: Infantry
- Size: Brigade
- Part of: 42nd Infantry Division (United States)
- Garrison/HQ: Syracuse
- Nickname: Empire (special designation)
- Engagements: Iraq War; War in Afghanistan

Commanders
- Current commander: Colonel Bradley Frank (since July 2023)

Insignia
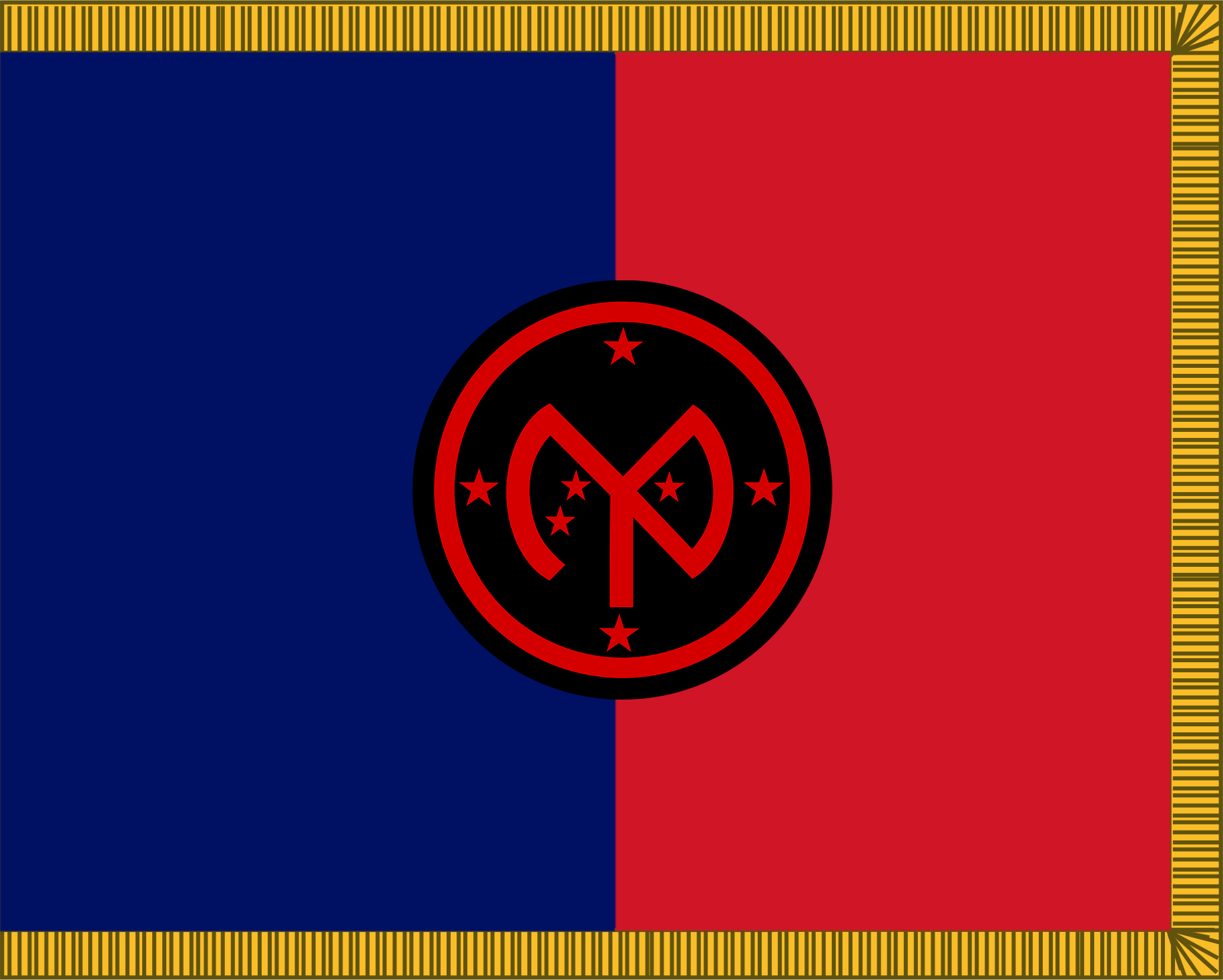
- 27th Infantry Brigade Flag

The 27th Infantry Brigade Combat Team ("Empire") is an infantry brigade combat team of the New York Army National Guard, one of the brigades that make up the 42nd Infantry Division.

The stated mission of the 27th Infantry Brigade is to maintain a manned, trained and equipped force capable of rapid deployment to any area within New York to aid civil authorities. The 27th Infantry Brigade Combat Team is also tasked with overseas deployment missions and must be capable to respond to any threat, foreign or domestic.

== History ==
After World War I the 27th Infantry Division was reactivated back in the New York National Guard for peacetime service, climaxed by participation in the First Army maneuvers of 1940.

From soon after World War II to 1967–68 the 27th Infantry Division remained active in the National Guard. The 27th was redesignated as an armored division from 1955-1968.

=== Reduction to brigade, 1967-68 ===
In 1968, the division was reduced to become a brigade of the 50th Armored Division.

Composition of the 27th Brigade, 50th Armored Division in 1968:

- Headquarters & Headquarters Company
- 1st Battalion, 127th Armor
- 1st Battalion, 108th Infantry
- 1st Battalion, 174th Infantry
- Troop B, 5th Squadron, 117th Cavalry
- 1st Battalion, 156th Artillery (later 156th Field Artillery)
- Company C, 104th Engineer Battalion
- Company C, 50th Medical Battalion
- Company C, 50th Maintenance Battalion
- Detachment 1, Company B, 250th Supply & Transportation Battalion
- 127th Quartermaster Detachment

=== Conversion to light infantry ===
The 27th Brigade was reconstituted as a separate infantry brigade (light) in the 1980s and was originally established as a "round-out" brigade to the Army's 10th Mountain Division (Light Infantry) at Fort Drum.

In the 1990s, the Army National Guard nationwide was reorganized and the 27th was established as one of 15 separate "enhanced" brigades, subject to priority call up in the event of a federal mobilization.

In 1998, the 27th Brigade was committed to disaster recovery operations in the New York's North Country following a devastating ice storm which struck in January. The 27th was called again for state emergency response in the wake of a destructive wind storm which struck Syracuse on Labor Day that year forcing an early close to the New York State Fair.

In the summer of 2001, the 27th Brigade deployed for an intense three-week training period at the U.S. Army's Joint Readiness Training Center at Fort Polk, LA. Nearly 4,000 soldiers from the New York Army National Guard participated, making it the largest single exercise for the New York National Guard since World War II. The terrorist attacks of 9-11, 2001 struck within weeks of when the brigade returned home. Many members of the brigade lived or worked in New York City at the time and several unit members were actually at the World Trade Center during the attacks. Scores of unit members mustered at the headquarters of B Co, 1st Bn, 105th Infantry located at the 69th Regiment Armory on Lexington Avenue and within a matter of hours, roughly two platoons from B Company, including several soldiers and officers from other 27th Brigade units, deployed further downtown in two public buses borrowed from the MTA. Their mission was to assist the New York Police Department in their security and recovery efforts and was the first Army unit to respond to Ground Zero on 9-11.

Following extensive state and federal active duty for Homeland Defense in response to the terrorist attacks of 9-11, 2001, subordinate units of the 27th underwent individual call ups for Operation Iraqi Freedom in 2003. In 2006, following the return of most New York National guard units from federal active duty in Iraq, the New York Army National Guard was "re-set" and the 27th was reorganized as an infantry brigade combat team. The brigade was formed when the 27th Infantry Division was deactivated in 1967. (However, a previous 27th Brigade was active from Jul 1918 – Feb 1919 as part of the 14th Division, comprising the 10th and 77th Regiments.)

On 1 October 2003 elements from the 27th were mobilized in support of Operation Iraqi Freedom. Comprising the 2d Battalion, 108th Infantry (with volunteers from the 1st Battalion, 108th Infantry and the 1st Battalion, 105th Infantry); Company C, 427th Support Battalion; 827th Engineers Company; and Fire Support Teams from the 1st Battalion, 156th Field Artillery, Task Force Hunter deployed into Iraq in Feb 2004 after pre-deployment training at Fort Drum, New York and Fort Polk, Louisiana.

On 1 August 2007, the unit was redesignated as the 27th Infantry Brigade Combat Team, as part of the Army's move to a "modular" force, and it lost its former status as a separate brigade. Retaining its historic shoulder patch from the 27th Infantry Division (United States), the 27th became, once again, a component of the 42nd Infantry Division. Until then it had been designated the 27th Infantry Brigade (Light) and had been one of the fifteen "enhanced brigades" found in the Army National Guard's force structure. From 1985 until 2005, the 27th had also been the "round-out" brigade of the Regular Army's 10th Mountain Division (Light Infantry), based in upstate New York at Fort Drum. It lost this mission when the 10th added its 3d and 4th Brigades, composed of active-duty Regular Army soldiers, during its own reorganization.

On 27 September 2007 advanced elements from the 27th, primarily composed of soldiers from the 2d Battalion, 108th Infantry and 1st Battalion, 69th Infantry, as well as volunteers from 2d Squadron, 101st Cavalry, began shipping out from New York State to Fort Bragg for pre-deployment training and exercises prior to a combat deployment in Afghanistan. The main brigade element mobilized on 16 January 2008. After conducting mobilization training at Fort Bragg, NC they deployed to Afghanistan beginning in March, 2008. In Afghanistan, the 27th consisted of only two battalions: a Security Forces (SECFOR) battalion and the Logistics Task Force (LTF) and was primarily responsible for the physical security of various base camps and operating bases. Individuals were "sliced" off of their parent units and assigned to police mentor teams (PMTs) or to embedded training teams (ETTs) while the bulk of the 27th conducted security operations from their FOBs. It resulted in 27th Brigade soldiers serving throughout Afghanistan. The SECFOR battalion was built around the 2d Squadron, 101st Cavalry Regiment. The LTF conducted logistics support throughout the Task Force Phoenix area of operation and supported civil military operations throughout the country. They were in-country for roughly nine months.

The 27th BCT took command of Task Force Phoenix on 26 April 2008 from the 218th BCT, South Carolina Army National Guard. They were relieved on 19 December 2008 by the 33d BCT, Illinois Army National Guard.

The 27th BCT mobilized in 2012 for Camp Shelby Mississippi, and left for the Middle East not long thereafter. Elements of the brigade's 427th BSB were trained in customs duties and organized to support the return of equipment from the Afghanistan theater and to 427th BSB's A Co (the transportation company) was sent to Kuwait. The 2nd Battalion, 108th Infantry, along with the 2nd Squadron, 101st Cavalry, and the South Carolina Army National Guard's 4th Battalion, 118th Infantry, based in Union, S.C. also deployed to conduct security missions. A Co. 27th BSTB based in Lockport, N.Y. conducted Route Clearance.

== Organization 2025 ==
- 27th Infantry Brigade Combat Team, in Syracuse (NY)
  - Headquarters and Headquarters Company, 27th Infantry Brigade Combat Team, in Syracuse (NY)
  - 2nd Squadron, 101st Cavalry Regiment, in Niagara Falls (NY)
    - Headquarters and Headquarters Troop, 2nd Squadron, 101st Cavalry Regiment, in Niagara Falls (NY)
    - Troop A, 2nd Squadron, 101st Cavalry Regiment, in Geneva (NY)
    - Troop B, 2nd Squadron, 101st Cavalry Regiment, in Jamestown (NY)
      - Detachment 1, Troop B, 2nd Squadron, 101st Cavalry Regiment, in Buffalo (NY)
    - Troop C (Dismounted), 2nd Squadron, 101st Cavalry Regiment, in Buffalo (NY)
  - 1st Battalion, 69th Infantry Regiment, in Manhattan (NY)
    - Headquarters and Headquarters Company, 1st Battalion, 69th Infantry Regiment, in Manhattan (NY)
    - Company A, 1st Battalion, 69th Infantry Regiment, in Harlem (NY)
    - Company B, 1st Battalion, 69th Infantry Regiment, in Farmingdale (NY)
    - Company C, 1st Battalion, 69th Infantry Regiment, in Harlem (NY)
      - Detachment 1, Company C, 1st Battalion, 69th Infantry Regiment, in Manhattan (NY)
    - Company D (Weapons), 1st Battalion, 69th Infantry Regiment, in Farmingdale (NY)
  - 2nd Battalion, 108th Infantry Regiment, in Utica (NY)
    - Headquarters and Headquarters Company, 2nd Battalion, 108th Infantry Regiment, in Utica (NY)
    - Company A, 2nd Battalion, 108th Infantry Regiment, in Geneseo (NY)
      - Detachment 1, Company A, 2nd Battalion, 108th Infantry Regiment, in Morrisonville (NY)
    - Company B, 2nd Battalion, 108th Infantry Regiment, at Camp Smith (NY)
    - Company C, 2nd Battalion, 108th Infantry Regiment, in Gloversville (NY)
      - Detachment 1, Company C, 2nd Battalion, 108th Infantry Regiment, in Leeds (NY)
    - Company D (Weapons), 2nd Battalion, 108th Infantry Regiment, in Ithaca (NY)
  - 1st Battalion, 182nd Infantry Regiment, in Melrose (MA) — (Massachusetts National Guard)
    - Headquarters and Headquarters Company, 1st Battalion, 182nd Infantry Regiment, in Melrose (MA)
    - Company A, 1st Battalion, 182nd Infantry Regiment, in Stoughton (MA)
    - Company B, 1st Battalion, 182nd Infantry Regiment, in Melrose (MA)
    - Company C, 1st Battalion, 182nd Infantry Regiment, in Braintree (MA)
    - Company D (Weapons), 1st Battalion, 182nd Infantry Regiment, in Middleborough (MA)
  - 1st Battalion, 258th Field Artillery Regiment, in Jamaica (NY)
    - Headquarters and Headquarters Battery, 1st Battalion, 258th Field Artillery Regiment, in Jamaica (NY)
      - Detachment 1, Headquarters and Headquarters Battery, 1st Battalion, 258th Field Artillery Regiment, in Peekskill (NY)
    - Battery A, 1st Battalion, 258th Field Artillery Regiment, in New Windsor (NY)
    - Battery B, 1st Battalion, 258th Field Artillery Regiment, at Camp Smith (NY)
    - Battery C, 1st Battalion, 258th Field Artillery Regiment, at Camp Smith (NY)
  - 152nd Brigade Engineer Battalion, in Buffalo (NY)
    - Headquarters and Headquarters Company, 152nd Brigade Engineer Battalion, in Buffalo (NY)
    - Company A (Combat Engineer), 152nd Brigade Engineer Battalion, in Manhattan (NY)
    - Company B (Combat Engineer), 152nd Brigade Engineer Battalion, in Lockport (NY)
    - Company C (Signal), 152nd Brigade Engineer Battalion, in Buffalo (NY)
    - Company D (Military Intelligence), 152nd Brigade Engineer Battalion, in Syracuse (NY)
      - Detachment 1, Company D (Military Intelligence), 152nd Brigade Engineer Battalion, at Greater Rochester Airport (NY) (RQ-28A UAV)
  - 427th Brigade Support Battalion, in Syracuse (NY)
    - Headquarters and Headquarters Company, 427th Brigade Support Battalion, in Syracuse (NY)
    - Company A (Distribution), 427th Brigade Support Battalion, in Rochester (NY)
    - Company B (Maintenance), 427th Brigade Support Battalion, at Fort Drum (NY)
    - Company C (Medical), 427th Brigade Support Battalion, in Buffalo (NY)
    - Company D (Forward Support), 427th Brigade Support Battalion, in Buffalo (NY) — attached to 2nd Squadron, 101st Cavalry Regiment
    - Company E (Forward Support), 427th Brigade Support Battalion, in Buffalo (NY) — attached to 152nd Brigade Engineer Battalion
    - Company F (Forward Support), 427th Brigade Support Battalion, in Jamaica (NY) — attached to 1st Battalion, 258th Field Artillery Regiment
    - Company G (Forward Support), 427th Brigade Support Battalion, in Glenville (NY) — attached to 2nd Battalion, 108th Infantry Regiment
    - Company H (Forward Support), 427th Brigade Support Battalion, in Farmingdale (NY) — attached to 1st Battalion, 69th Infantry Regiment
    - Company I (Forward Support), 427th Brigade Support Battalion, in Dorchester (MA) — attached to 1st Battalion, 182nd Infantry Regiment (Massachusetts Army National Guard)

== Commander ==
In July 2023, Colonel Bradley Frank assumed command of the 27th IBCT, succeeding Colonel Sean Flynn, who was promoted to brigadier general Flynn had assumed command in 2021, succeeding Colonel Robert Charlesworth, who commanded the brigade beginning in 2019. Charlesworth commanded the brigade until 2021, following Colonel Christopher R. Cronin, who had been in command from 2017 to 2019. Cronin had succeeded Joseph L. Biehler, who led the 27th Brigade from 2013 to 2017.

== In popular fiction ==
The military units depicted in the movie Cloverfield are members of the 27th Infantry Brigade.

The military units in the movie I Am Legend are members of the 27th Infantry Brigade, specifically the 1st Battalion, 69th Infantry Regiment.

Elements of the 27th Infantry Division are depicted in the HBO miniseries The Pacific.
