= 142nd Aviation Regiment =

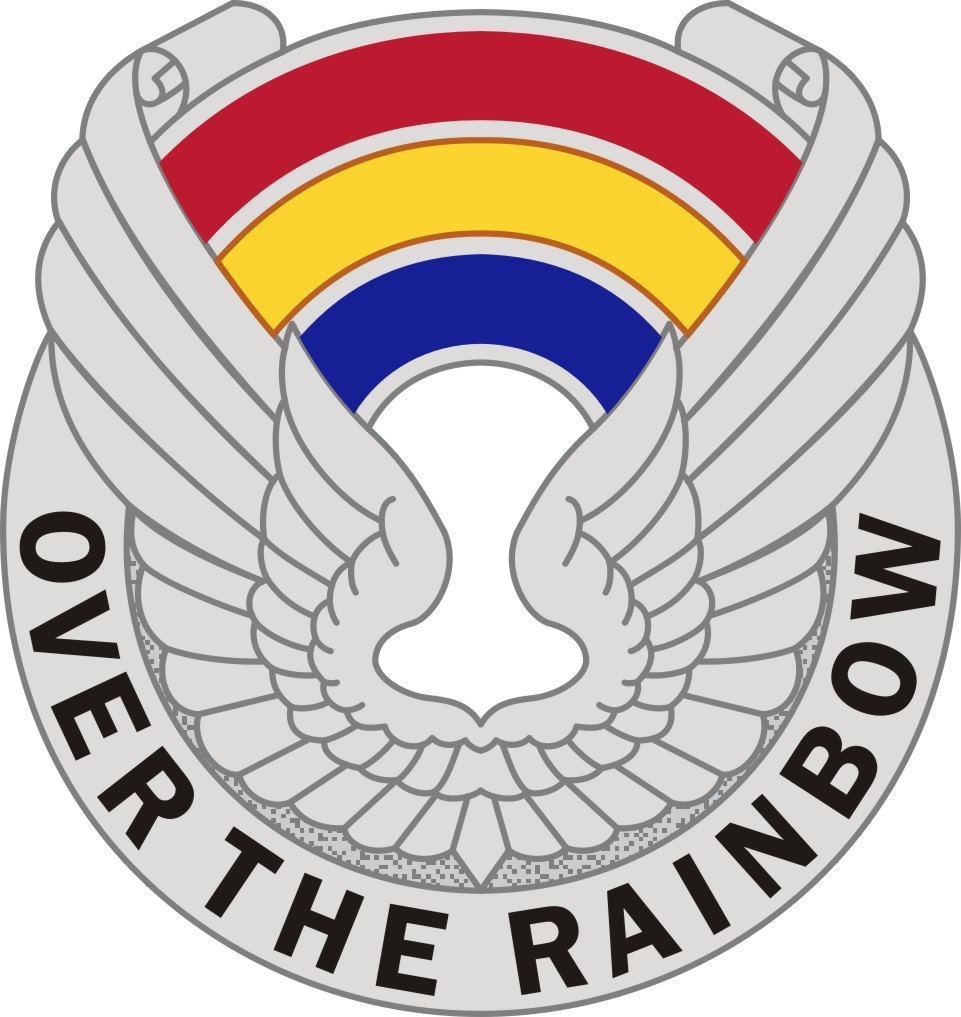
- Insignia of the 142nd Aviation Regiment
- Country: United States of America
- Branch: United States Army Aviation Branch
- Type: Aviation

Aircraft flown
- Utility helicopter: UH-60L Black Hawk

The 142nd Aviation Regiment is an aviation regiment of the United States Army. It is part of the 42nd Combat Aviation Brigade, 42nd Infantry Division.

The 1-142 Aviation and the 642nd Divisional Aviation Support Battalion were consolidated and re-designated as the 642d Aviation Support Battalion after the battalion's return from deployment to Iraq in late 2005. The Battalion’s colors moved to its new headquarters at the Patriot Way armory in Rochester. The consolidation took place on 5 August 2006.

== Structure ==
- 1st Battalion
- 3d Battalion (Assault)
  - Iraq 2008-2009
  - Headquarters & Headquarters Company (NY ARNG), Ronkonkoma, New York
    - Detachment 1 (NY ARNG), Ronkonkoma, New York
    - Detachment 2 (ME ARNG), Aviation Support Facility, Bangor Armory, Bangor, Maine
  - Company A (NY ARNG), Latham, New York)
  - Company B (NY ARNG), Ronkonkoma, New York
  - Company C (CT ARNG), Army Aviation Support Facility, Windsor Locks, Connecticut
    - Detachment 1 (ME ARNG), Aviation Support Facility, Bangor Armory, Bangor, Maine
  - Company D (NY ARNG), Latham, New York
    - Detachment 1 (NY ARNG), Latham, New York
    - Detachment 2 (ME ARNG), Aviation Support Facility, Bangor Armory, Bangor, Maine
  - Company E (NY ARNG), Farmingdale, New York
    - Detachment 2 (ME ARNG), Aviation Support Facility, Bangor Armory, Bangor, Maine
    - Detachment 3 (NY ARNG), Latham, New York
