= 53rd Troop Command =

53rd Troop Command (1994–) 53rd Infantry Brigade (1917–1919) 3rd Brigade, New York State Militia (1886–1917)
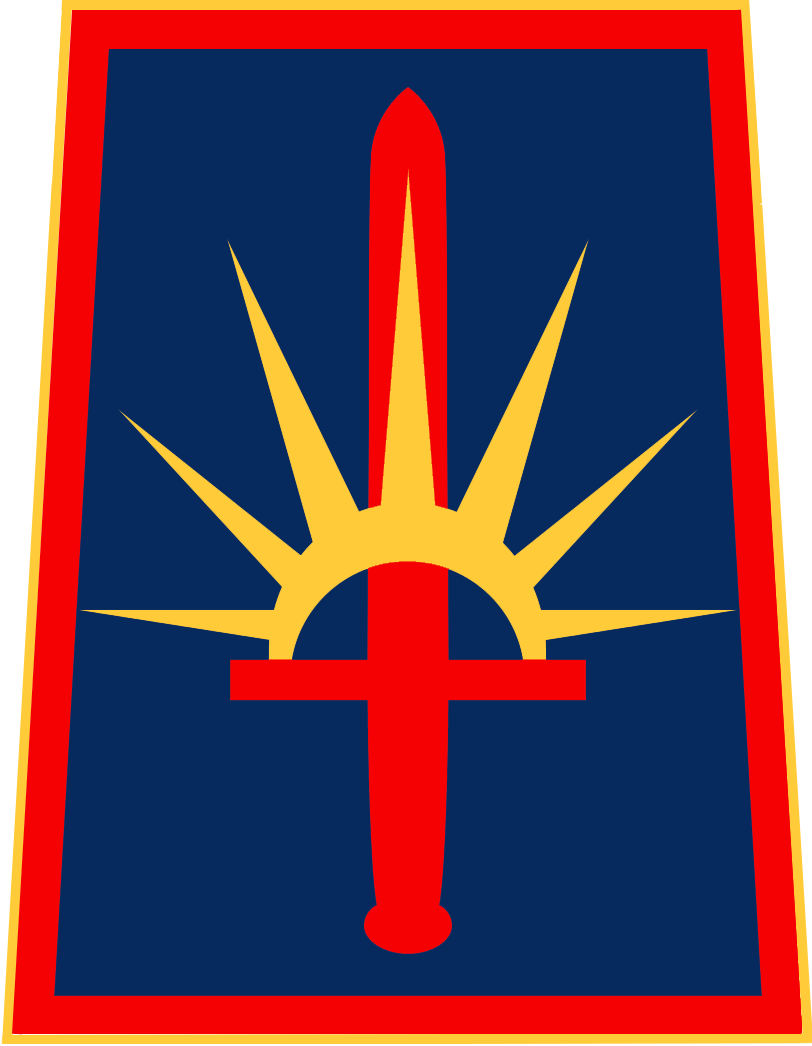
- 53rd Troop Command shoulder sleeve insignia
- Active: 1917–present
- Country: United States
- Branch: United States Army National Guard
- Type: Headquarters
- Part of: New York Army National Guard
- Garrison/HQ: Camp Smith
- Engagements: World War I Western Front, World War I World War II

Commanders
- Current commander: Brigadier General Isabel Rivera Smith

Insignia
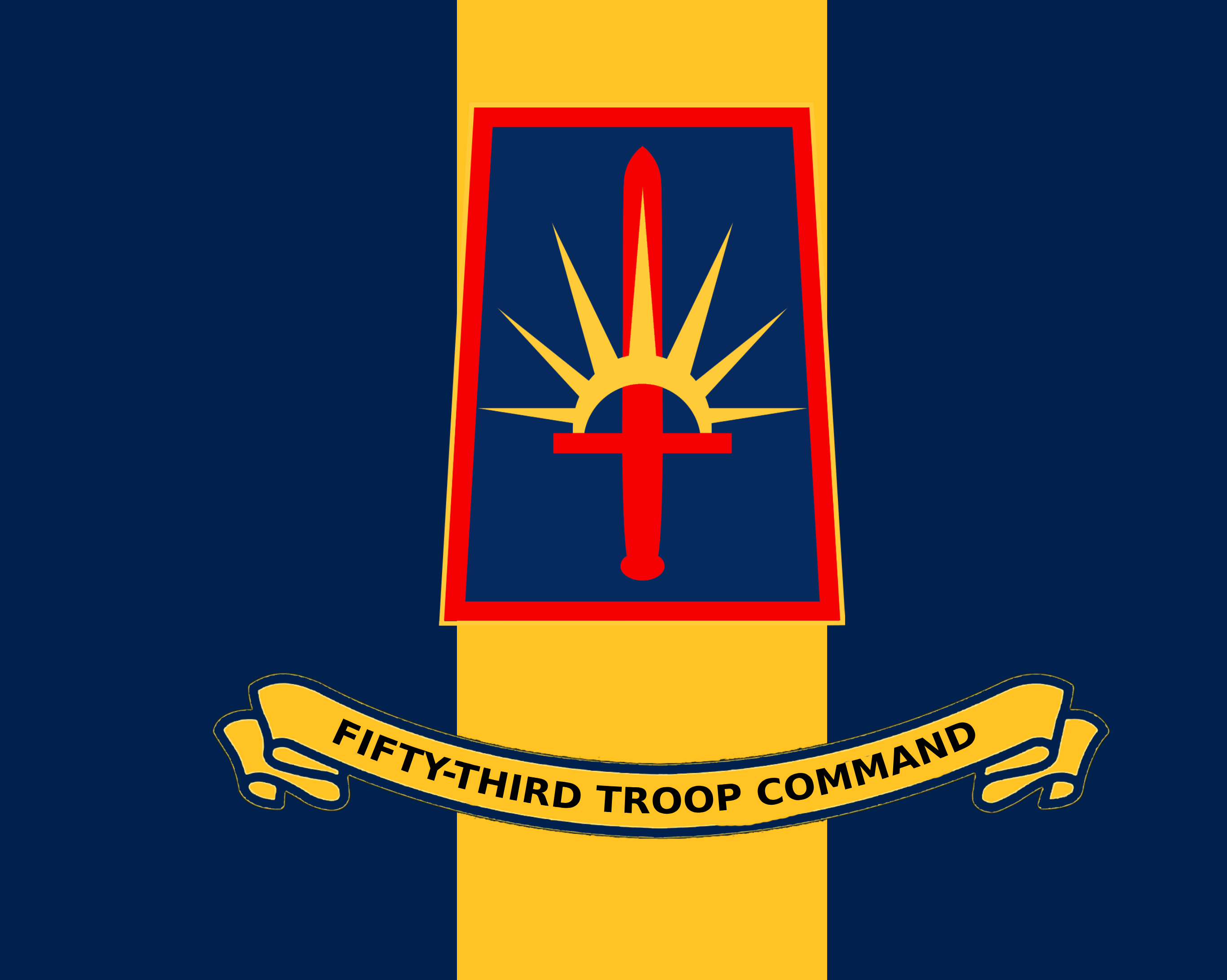
- New York Army National Guard 53rd Troop Command Flag

The 53rd Troop Command is an administrative headquarters of the New York Army National Guard that provides direction for units not under another brigade or other formation headquarters (HQ). It also provides administrative support to units from other formations in the New York area that are stationed a long way from their higher HQ.

== History ==
The 53rd Troop Command descends from a New York Army National Guard administrative grouping established after the American Civil War. Following the Civil War, efforts were made to link the varied military units in New York under overall headquarters. As a result of this the 3rd Brigade, New York State Militia, came into being on 5 August 1886.

The Brigade consisted of the 4th Battery at Troy, the 6th Battery in Binghamton, the 10th Battalion in Albany (Infantry), and a number of separate companies. The separate companies included the 3rd Company at Oneonta, the 4th Company at Yonkers, the 5th Company at Newburgh, the 12th Company in Troy, the 14th Company at Kingston, the 15th Company at Poughkeepsie, the 16th Company at Catskill, the 18th Company in Glens Falls, the 19th Company in Poughkeepsie, the 20th Company in Binghamton, the 21st Company in Troy, the 22nd Company in Saratoga, the 23rd Company in Hudson, the 24th Company in Utica, the 27th Company in Malone, the 28th Company in Utica, and the 31st Company in Albany.

=== World War I ===
For World War I the Headquarters Detachment was organized on 12 July 1917 and on 16 July 1917 mustered into federal service. It arrived in Camp Wadsworth, Spartanburg, South Carolina in early fall and was redesignated the 53rd Brigade of the U.S. 27th Division. It was now composed of the 105th Infantry Regiment, the 106th Infantry Regiment and the 105th Machine Gun Battalion.
During May 1918, the 53rd Brigade sailed to France and assembled with the Division in the Rue area.

The 53rd was involved in the following major operations:

- The Dickebursch-Scherpenberg Defensive Sector in Flanders
- The Ypres-Lys Offensive in Belgium
- The Somme Offensive (1918) in Picardy

These operations covered secondary battles, engagements and minor operations of the East Poperinghe Line, Vierstraat Ridge, the Hindenburg Line, Le Selle River Jonc DeMer Ridge and the St. Maurice River.

=== Demobilization and inter-war years ===
The 53d Brigade returned to the US early in 1919 and was demobilized at Camp Upton Long Island on 30 March 1919. It resumed the designation of the 3rd Brigade, National Guard of New York.

In 1921, the 3rd Brigade, consisting of the 2nd, 10th and the 23rd regiments, National Guard of New York, was redesignated as the 53d Brigade. The Headquarters Company of the 53rd was organized on 13 July 1921 and was again assigned to the US 27th Division. The regiments were redesignated to their World War I designations, and once more assumed its old composition of the 105th Infantry Regiment (former 2nd New York) and 106th Infantry Regiment (former 106th New York) and elements of the 10th New York Regiment.

=== World War II ===
In September 1940, the 106th Infantry was taken out of the Brigade (and redesignated a Coastal Artillery regiment), it was replaced by the 10th Infantry. In December 1940 the 10th was redesignated the 106th Infantry Regiment.

On 15 October 1940 the 27th Division was activated for World War II. During December 1941 the Division deployed to its training areas at Fort McClellan, Alabama, to California. From 27 February to 15 March the Division moved to Hilo, Hawaii. The 27th Division was the first National Guard unit to go overseas, this began the longest wartime overseas service of any National Guard Division in the US Army. The Division garrisoned the Hawaiian Islands, the 53d Brigade was responsible for the "big" island of Hawaii. On 31 August 1942 the Division was "triangulized" into three main Regimental Combat Teams (RCT). The Headquarters 53rd Brigade was redesignated the 27th Cavalry Reconnaissance Troop.

The history of the 27th Division in the Pacific includes; 16 June to 9 July 1944 Saipan, 9 April to September 1945 Okinawa, September to 12 December 1945 occupation of Japan in the Sasebo area of Honshū and towards the end of September in Northern Japan. Specific parts of RCTs of the 27th participated in other campaigns but they did not include the 27th Cavalry Reconnaissance Troop. The Division left Yokohama on 12 December 1945 and arrived in Seattle, Washington 26 December 1945. The Division was deactivated 31 December 1945 at Ft Lawton, Washington.

=== Creation of State Area Command ===
Creation of State Area Command (STARC), Headquarters Troop Command (HTC) at Washington Avenue Armory, Albany, which replaced the CAC.

With the completion of the new headquarters and armory in Latham the HTC was relocated to Latham in November 1986. The closure of the Washington Avenue Armory in early 1991 and other force structure saw the HTC relocated to Glenmore Road Armory in Troy, to replace the 205th Support Group and 27th Rear Area Operations Center (RAOC) which relocated to NYC. Upon the re-designation of the 42d Infantry Division as Armor, and the headquarters of a consolidated North East Division, the HTC and the 42d in the 14th Street Armory in New York City exchanged locations. The closure of the 14th Street Armory compelled the HTC to relocate to Camp Smith, Peekskill. In 1998 space became available at the Valhalla Armory and the headquarters was again relocated to this facility.

The National Guard Bureau advised on 26 March 1994 that troop commands had been authorized to be redesignated with a numerical designation. Effective 1 July 1994, the STARC-HTC was redesignated with its old 53d designation as the 53rd Troop Command.

== Organization ==
- 53rd Troop Command, at Camp Smith
  - Headquarters and Headquarters Detachment, 53rd Troop Command, at Camp Smith
  - 2nd Civil Support Team (WMD), in Scotia
  - 24th Civil Support Team (WMD), at Fort Hamilton
  - 53rd Digital Liaison Detachment, in Manhattan
  - 138th Chaplain Detachment, at Camp Smith
  - 138th Public Affairs Detachment, at Camp Smith
  - Cyber Protection Team 173, at Camp Smith
  - 101st Expeditionary Signal Battalion, in Yonkers
    - Headquarters and Headquarters Company, 101st Expeditionary Signal Battalion, in Yonkers
    - Company A, 101st Expeditionary Signal Battalion, in Peekskill
    - Company B, 101st Expeditionary Signal Battalion, in Orangeburg
    - Company C, 101st Expeditionary Signal Battalion, in Yonkers
  - 104th Military Police Battalion, in Kingston
    - Headquarters and Headquarters Detachment, 104th Military Police Battalion, in Kingston
    - 107th Military Police Company (Combat Support), at Fort Hamilton
    - 222nd Chemical Company, at Fort Hamilton
    - 442nd Military Police Company (Combat Support), in Jamaica
    - 727th Military Police Detachment (Law Enforcement), Camp Smith
  - 153rd Troop Command, in Buffalo
    - Headquarters and Headquarters Detachment, 153rd Troop Command, in Buffalo
    - 272nd Military Police Detachment (Theater Detainee Reporting Center), in Auburn
    - 102nd Military Police Battalion, in Auburn
      - Headquarters and Headquarters Detachment, 102nd Military Police Battalion, in Auburn
      - 105th Military Police Company (Combat Support), in Buffalo
      - 206th Military Police Company (Combat Support), at Albany Airport
        - Detachment 1, 206th Military Police Company (Combat Support), in Utica
      - 222nd Military Police Company (Combat Support), in Rochester
        - Detachment 1, 222nd Military Police Company (Combat Support), in Hornell
    - 204th Engineer Battalion, in Binghamton
      - Headquarters and Headquarters Company, 204th Engineer Battalion, in Binghamton
      - Forward Support Company, 204th Engineer Battalion, in Binghamton
      - 152nd Engineer Company (Engineer Support Company), in Buffalo
      - 204th Engineer Platoon (Quarry), in Binghamton
      - 827th Engineer Company (Engineer Construction Company), in Horseheads
        - Detachment 1, 827th Engineer Company (Engineer Construction Company), in Walton
      - 1156th Engineer Company (Vertical Construction Company), at Camp Smith
        - Detachment 1, 1156th Engineer Company (Vertical Construction Company), in Kingston
    - 501st Ordnance Battalion (EOD), in Glenville
      - Headquarters and Headquarters Detachment, 501st Ordnance Battalion (EOD), in Glenville
      - 387th Ordnance Company (EOD), at Camp Edwards (MA) — (Massachusetts Army National Guard)
      - 430th Ordnance Company (EOD), in Washington (NC) — (North Carolina Army National Guard)
      - 466th Medical Company (Area Support), in Queensbury
      - 745th Ordnance Company (EOD), at Camp Grayling (MI) — (Michigan Army National Guard)
      - 753rd Ordnance Company (EOD), at Camp Dawson (WV) — (West Virginia Army National Guard)
      - 1108th Ordnance Company (EOD), in Glenville
      - 1427th Transportation Company (Medium Truck) (Cargo), in Queensbury
        - Detachment 1, 1427th Transportation Company (Medium Truck) (Cargo), at Fort Drum

== Mission ==
Command, control, and supervise Army National Guard units attached to the Troop Command so as to provide manned, trained and equipped units capable of immediate expansion to war strength and available for service in time of war or national emergency or when appropriate to augment the active army.

In 2019, Brigadier General Joseph L. Biehler assumed command of the 53rd Troop Command, succeeding Brigadier General Jack A. James Jr., who was assigned to Biehler's former post as deputy commander of the 42nd Infantry Division. In December 2023, James returned as the 53rd Troop Command's commanding general after Biehler was selected to command the 42nd Division.
