= Camp Smith (New York) =

Military base in New York State, US

Coordinates: 41°17′56″N 73°56′31″W

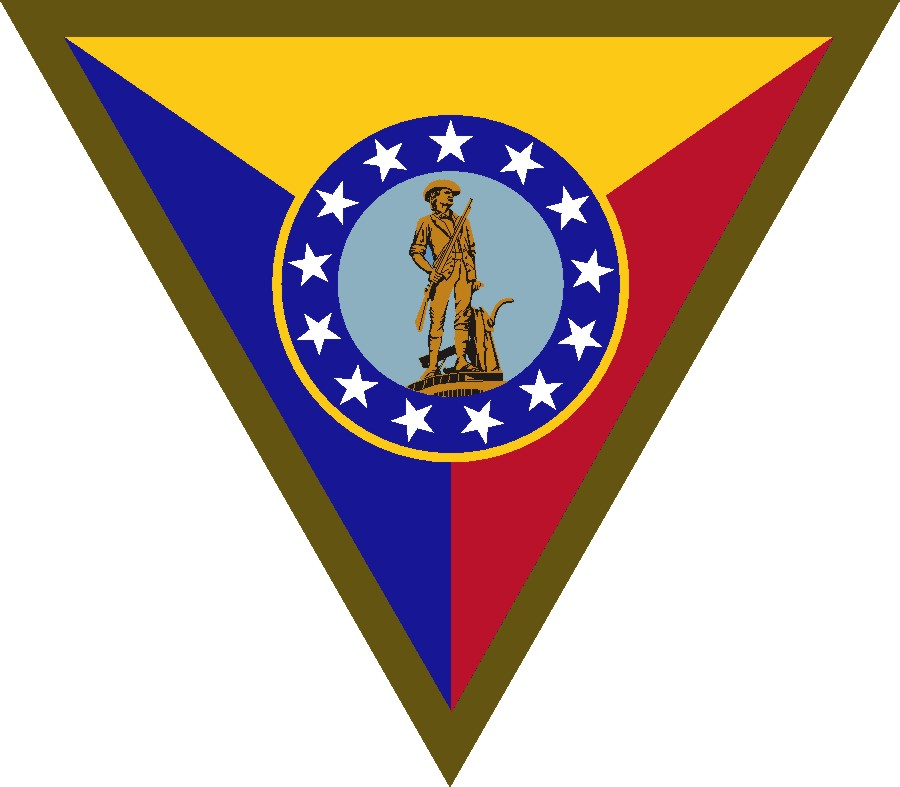
Army National Guard Training Center Guidance Council

Camp Smith is a military installation of the New York Army National Guard in Cortlandt Manor, in the Town of Cortlandt, near Peekskill, New York, about 30 miles (48 km) north of New York City, at the northern border of Westchester County, and consists of 1,900 acres (7.7 km^{2}). Established in 1882 by General Frederick Townsend, Adjutant General of New York, it was formerly known as Camp Townsend, but was renamed in 1919 to Camp Smith for Governor Alfred E. Smith of New York.

The camp has been used as an annual training site for National and State Guard regiments since its establishment, and recently has served as the home of the Empire State Military Academy, as well as the state's Non-Com, Officer Candidate School, and a Westchester County DES satellite fire training center. It also hosts some other units (e.g. The Headquarters and Headquarters Detachment of the 53rd Troop Command, 42nd Infantry Division Band, 138th Chaplain Support Team).

In 2011, the camp was named Training Center Garrison Command: New York in a re-patching ceremony where they also unfurled a new flag for the camp.
