= Long Island MacArthur Airport =

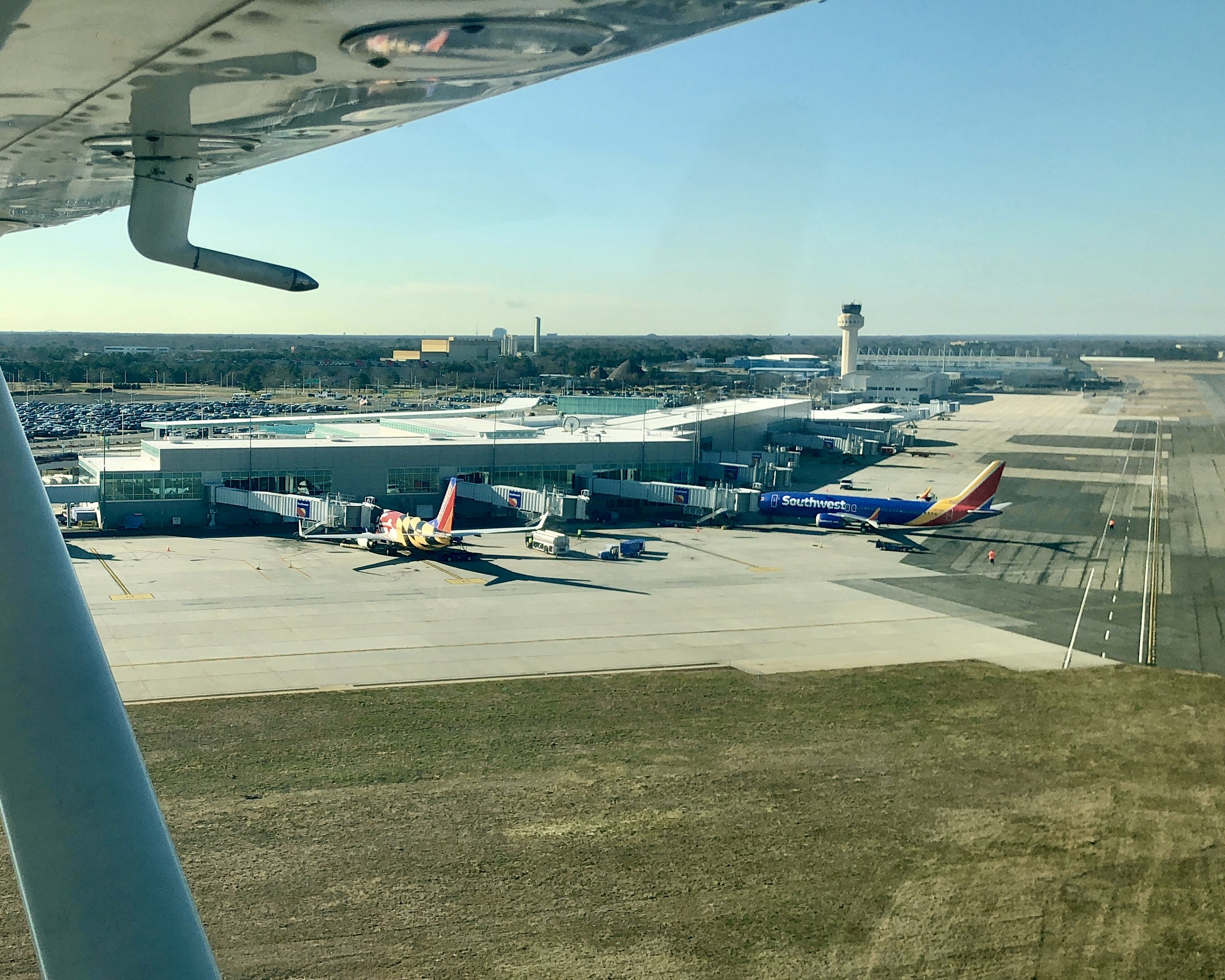
- Long Island MacArthur Airport’s terminal in 2018
- IATA: ISP; ICAO: KISP; FAA LID: ISP; WMO: 72505

Summary
- Airport type: Public
- Owner/Operator: Town of Islip
- Serves: Long Island and New York metropolitan area
- Location: 100 Arrival Avenue; Ronkonkoma, New York, U.S.
- Time zone: EST (UTC−05:00)
  - Summer (DST): EDT (UTC−04:00)
- Elevation AMSL: 99 ft (30 m)
- Coordinates: 40°47′43″N 073°06′01″W
- Website: flymacarthur.com

Maps
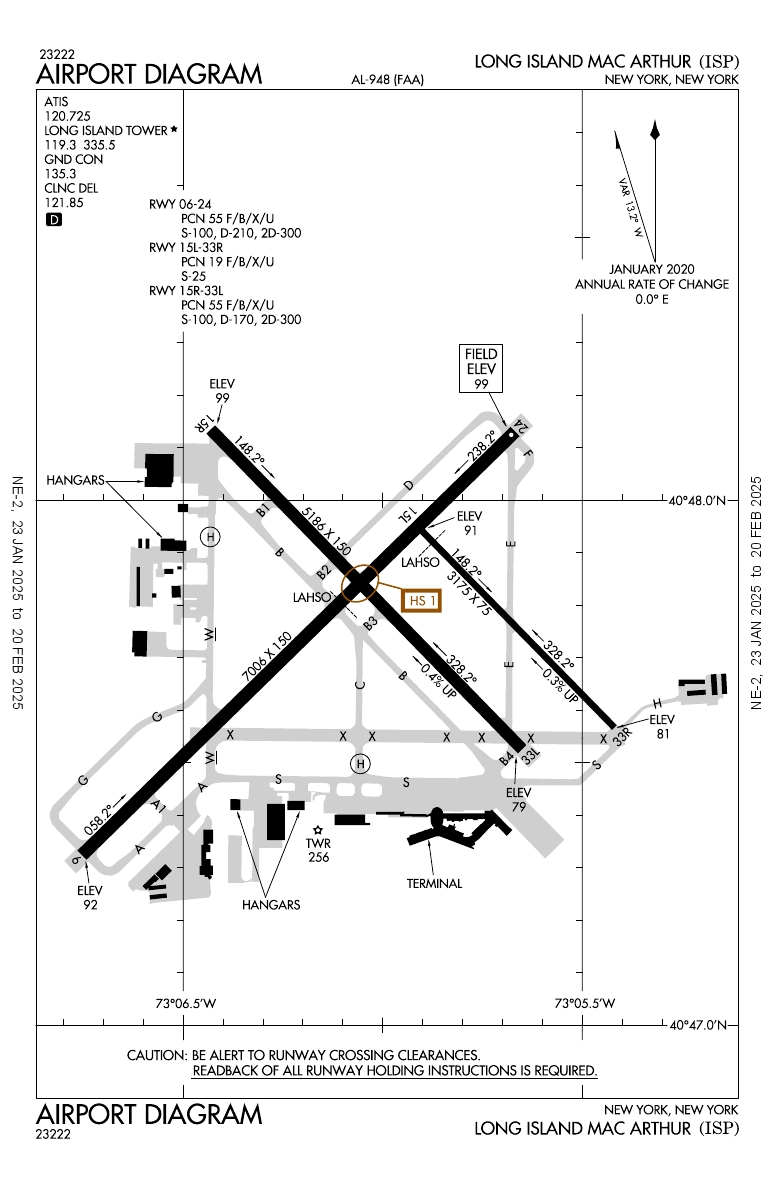
- FAA airport diagram as of 2025
- Interactive map of Long Island MacArthur Airport

Runways
Direction	Length		Surface
Direction	ft	m	Surface
06/24	7,006	2,135	Asphalt
15L/33R	3,175	968	Asphalt
15R/33L	5,186	1,581	Asphalt

Helipads
Number	Length		Surface
Number	ft	m	Surface
H1	50	15	Asphalt
H2	50	15	Asphalt

Statistics (2025)
- Aircraft operations: 170,453
- Based aircraft (2022): 273
- Total passengers: 1,580,000
- Source: Federal Aviation Administration

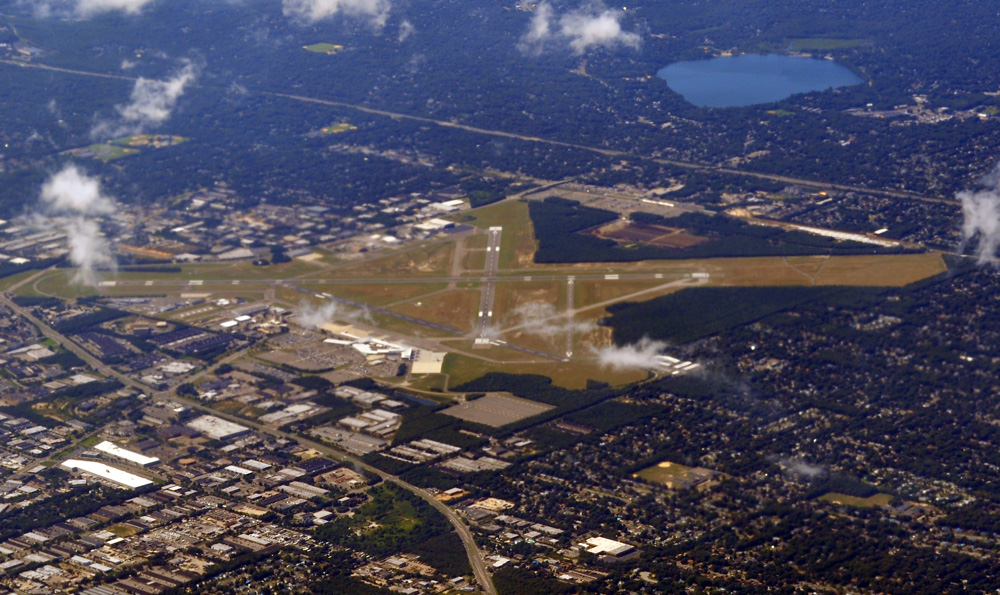
Aerial view of MacArthur Airport

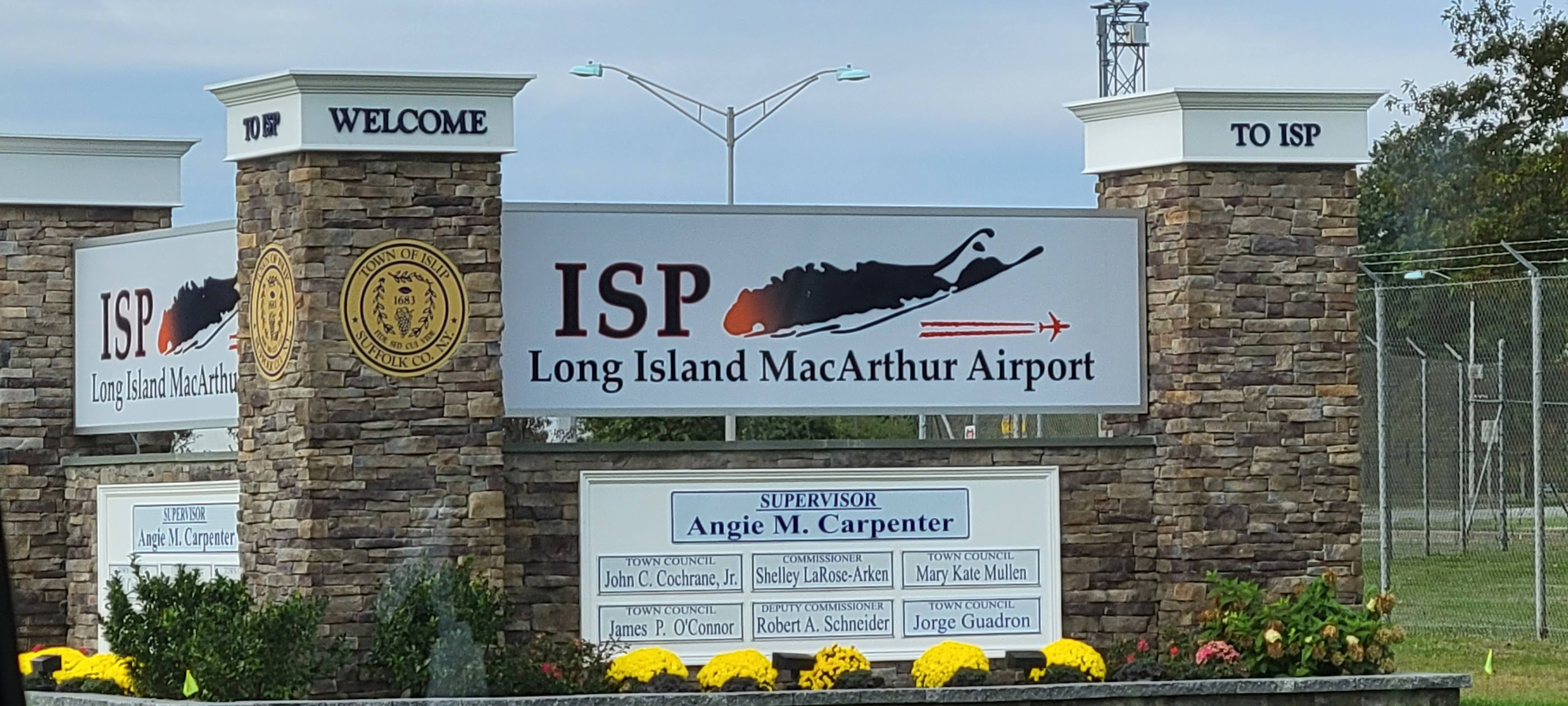
A welcome sign to the airport

Long Island MacArthur Airport (IATA: ISP, ICAO: KISP, FAA LID: ISP), formerly known as Islip Airport, is a public airport located in Ronkonkoma, New York, within the Town of Islip in Suffolk County, on Long Island. Covering 1,311 acres (531 ha), the airport was established in 1942, activated in 1943, and began operating as a commercial airport in 1960. It has three runways and two helipads.

Owned and operated by the Town of Islip, MacArthur Airport serves Nassau and Suffolk counties as an alternative to John F. Kennedy and LaGuardia airports – both of which are located in Queens, a borough of New York City. Shuttle buses connect the airport to the Long Island Rail Road's Ronkonkoma station.

The Federal Aviation Administration (FAA) designated the airport an Official Metro Airport in early 2011, meaning it is now grouped with LaGuardia, Kennedy, and Newark in travel and informational searches for New York airports, thus providing better exposure. MacArthur Airport does not share the congested airspace of the city-centric airports, and it has an exceptional record of on-time performance. In 2009, 83.6% of flights arrived on time and 85.6% of flights departed on time.

In 2016, it had 124,154 aircraft operations, an average of 340 per day; 84% general aviation; 7% scheduled airline; 6% air taxi and 2% military. In 2024, the airport served more than 1.36 million airline passengers. In July 2018, 247 aircraft were based at Islip: 141 single-engine, 30 multi-engine, 36 jets, 31 helicopters, and 9 military. The town-owned Islip Foreign Trade Zone is adjacent & directly connected to the airport.

== History ==
=== Early years ===
In April 1942, the Town of Islip contracted with the federal government to build an airfield on town-owned land for military use. Within months, the Civil Aeronautics Administration – the predecessor to today's Federal Aviation Administration – funded the construction of the airport and three paved runways through the federally-funded Development of Landing Areas for National Defense (DLAND) program. Originally named Islip Airport, at the suggestion of Charles H. Duryea – a local elected official, the airport was renamed MacArthur Airport after U.S. Army General Douglas MacArthur, whose dramatic escape from the Philippines during World War II had captured the attention of the world. The airport was officially activated in May 1943.

In 1944, Lockheed Aircraft Corporation built the first hangar at the airport. Five years later, the Town of Islip built the airport's first terminal building, in preparation for airline flights. Through the 1950s, the Sperry Corporation conducted aerospace research at the airport.

In 1947, the Town of Islip offered the airport to the Port of New York Authority (which is today the Port Authority of New York and New Jersey). The offer was rejected by the authority because of the airport's location outside of the port region.

=== Commercial service era ===
In 1960, Allegheny Airlines was the first scheduled passenger airline at Islip, flying to Boston, Philadelphia, and Washington, D.C. The March 1961 Official Airline Guide lists five weekday Convair 440 departures: a nonstop to Washington National, one to Baltimore, and three flights direct to Boston via several stops. The General Douglas MacArthur Terminal was completed in 1966. In 1967 Mohawk Airlines began two Fairchild Hiller FH-227 flights a day, to Bridgeport and Albany and beyond with one flight continuing to Toronto. By 1969 Mohawk was flying BAC One-Elevens nonstop to Syracuse. In 1972 Mohawk had nonstops to Albany with direct service to Buffalo and Rochester. Mohawk would soon be merged into Allegheny Airlines.

In 1971, American Airlines began flying nonstop Boeing 727-100s to Chicago O'Hare Airport. By 1974 Allegheny had started BAC One-Elevens and McDonnell Douglas DC-9-30s nonstop to Albany and Ronald Reagan Washington National Airport, and direct jets to Burlington, Vermont, Cincinnati, and Detroit. Allegheny continued operating Convair 580s nonstop to Albany, Boston, Bridgeport, and Washington, D.C., in addition to direct Convair 580s to Buffalo and Rochester. Allegheny would be renamed USAir, which then became US Airways, with these respective airlines operating service into the airport for many years before US Airways was merged into American.

The Official Airline Guide (OAG) shows the following passenger jets to Long Island MacArthur nonstop from the following at various times from the late 1960s to the late 1990s, with types:

- Allegheny Airlines: Albany, New Haven, Washington, D.C., National Airport – BAC One-Eleven, McDonnell Douglas DC-9-30
- American: Chicago O'Hare Airport, Raleigh/Durham – Boeing 727-100, Boeing 727-200, Fokker 100, McDonnell Douglas MD-80
- Braniff International Airlines: Orlando – Boeing 727-200
- Carnival Air Lines: Fort Lauderdale, Fort Myers, Orlando, Tampa, West Palm Beach – Boeing 737-400
- Continental: Washington, D.C., Dulles International Airport – Boeing 737-300
- Delta Express: Fort Lauderdale, Orlando, Tampa – Boeing 737-200
- Eastern Airlines: Atlanta, Fort Lauderdale, Orlando, Providence – Boeing 727-100, Boeing 727-200
- Mohawk Airlines: Syracuse – BAC One-Eleven
- New York Air: Washington, D.C., Dulles International Airport - McDonnell Douglas DC-9-30
- Northeastern International Airways: Boston, Fort Lauderdale, Hartford, Orlando, Philadelphia, St. Petersburg, West Palm Beach – Boeing 727-100, Boeing 727-200, Douglas DC-8
- Spirit Airlines: Detroit, Fort Lauderdale, Fort Myers, Tampa, West Palm Beach – McDonnell Douglas MD-80, McDonnell Douglas MD-87
- United: Chicago O'Hare Airport – Boeing 727-100, Boeing 727-200
- USAir: Albany, Baltimore, Charlotte, Fort Lauderdale, Orlando, Pittsburgh, Syracuse, Washington, D.C., National Airport – Boeing 727-200, Boeing 737-200, Boeing 737-300, Boeing 737-400, BAC One-Eleven, Fokker F28, Fokker 100, McDonnell Douglas DC-9-30

A number of commuter and regional airlines served the airport from the late 1970s to the late 1990s, including Allegheny Commuter, Altair Airlines, Atlantic Coast Airlines operating as United Express, Business Express Airlines operating as Delta Connection, Continental Express, Empire Airlines (1976-1985), Mall Airways, Metro Airlines Northeast operating as Trans World Express, Mohawk Airlines (a later commuter air carrier version), NewAir and its predecessor New Haven Airways, Piedmont Regional Airlines operating on behalf of Piedmont Airlines (1948-1989), Pilgrim Airlines, Precision Airlines operating as Northwest Airlink, Ransome Airlines, Air Vermont and USAir Express and its successor US Airways Express. According to the OAG, prop types operated by these smaller airlines to the airport included the ATR-42, Beechcraft 99, Beechcraft 1900C, BAe Jetstream 31, de Havilland Canada DHC-6 Twin Otter, de Havilland Canada DHC-7 Dash 7, de Havilland Canada DHC-8 Dash 8, Dornier 228, Embraer EMB-110 Bandeirante, Nord 262, Piper Navajo, Saab 340, Short 330, Short 360 and Swearingen Metro.

In 1989, construction of two small, four-gate concourses connected to the existing terminal building commenced. The project was completed in 1990; the two concourses included the first jet bridges installed at the airport.

In 1994, Continental Express was operating ATR-42s nonstop between the airport and the Continental Airlines hub at Newark Airport. By 1999, Atlantic Southeast Airlines (ASA) flying as Delta Connection was operating Canadair CRJ-200s nonstop to the Delta Air Lines hub in Atlanta while Comair, also flying as Delta Connection, was operating Canadair CRJ-200s nonstop to Delta's hub in Cincinnati. Also in 1999, Continental Express was flying Embraer ERJ-145s nonstop to the Continental Airlines hub in Cleveland. Southwest Airlines also arrived at Islip in 1999, with nonstop Boeing 737-700s to Baltimore, Chicago Midway Airport, Nashville, and Tampa.

In the early 2000s, Continental Express continued to serve the airport with nonstop regional jets to Cleveland while Continental Connection scheduled nonstop turboprops to Albany, New York; both services ended in 2005. Spirit Airlines scheduled flights to several Florida cities and Detroit, before moving to LaGuardia Airport in 2001; in May 2008 the airline resumed service to Fort Lauderdale from MacArthur, but dropped it shortly thereafter. Delta Express, which had nonstops to Orlando and Fort Lauderdale, dropped MacArthur Airport in 2003 after a decline in traffic. Delta Connection regional jet service to Atlanta flown by Atlantic Southeast Airlines (ASA) on behalf of Delta Air Lines ended on May 1, 2008, following a mid-April announcement that Delta and Northwest Airlines were planning to merge – a move that led to changes for the merged airline.

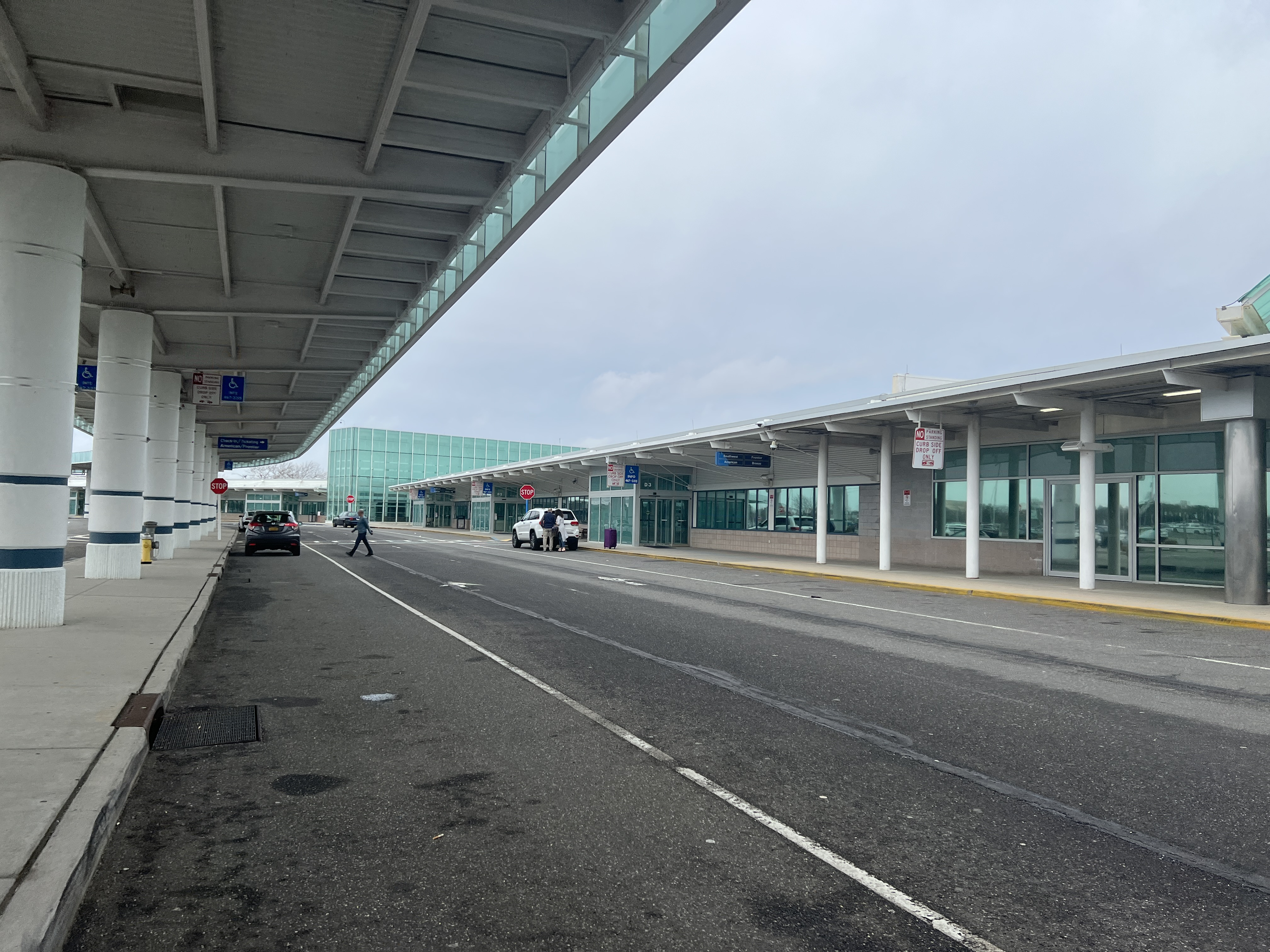
Arrival Avenue in front of the terminal building in February 2023

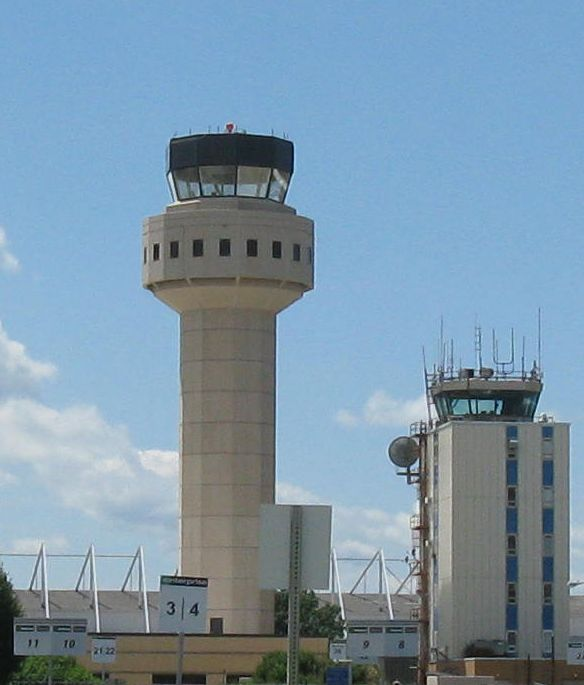
ISP's current (left) and former (right) control towers; the current tower was finished in 2010

Following the September 11, 2001 attacks, MacArthur Airport saw a 25% decrease in passenger traffic. Passenger traffic later increased, but they decreased again in 2006. Charts depicting annual operations and passenger boardings are in Appendix C and D. In 2005 MacArthur Airport had 173,135 total operations; during this year 1,055,832 passenger were enplaned, 7.07% more than 2004. In 2006 MacArthur had 189,390 total operations with 1,138,061 passenger boardings. The year 2007 brought total operations at MacArthur down to 184,760 but passenger boardings increased to 1,167,515, MacArthur's highest boardings in the last 6 years. In 2008, total operations at MacArthur were 179,230 and passenger boardings were down to 1,048,768; in 2009, 159,736 total operations and 929,902 passenger boardings. From 2005 to 2009 almost every category of MacArthur's operations has declined: airline, military, air taxi, and general aviation. A figure was released in the 2010s citing a 46.4% decrease from 2007 to 2012, the most loss in any small hub airport. The figures rose back up as the decade progressed, but temporarily dipped down again in 2020 due to COVID-19. By 2023, the figures had again increased, with 1,278,000 passengers recorded that year.

In 2004, MacArthur Airport embarked on an expansion that included a new, Gensler-designed Southwest Airlines terminal built by the airline at a cost of $65 million. Phase one of the expansion included four gates to be used by Southwest, as well as space for shops and restaurants. Phase two, completed in November 2006, added four more gates for a total of eight new gates. Prior to the expansion project, passengers had to pass back through the ticketing area of the airport to reach the baggage claim area. With the completion of Phase two, the new concourse provided a more convenient exit point to baggage claim, ground transportation, and the airport's roadway exit. Nevertheless, the location of the baggage claim area still requires most travelers using the airport's long-term parking lots to pass back through the ticketing area of the airport to reach their vehicles. The construction of the 2004 expansion caused a scandal when it was discovered that the new concourse was built without the needed approvals from New York State and with numerous violations.

The then-Suffolk County District Attorney Thomas J. Spotta, who was involved in the investigation of the scandal, stated that large portions of the new concourse were in violation of fire and safety codes, causing risks to public safety. Violations included the main electrical control room being built with improperly-placed fire sprinklers, creating an explosion risk – and natural gas pipes being constructed right below the terminal's air conditioning intake manifolds, creating a risk for gas entering the terminal through its ventilation systems in the event of a gas leak. Town officials eventually pled guilty to corruption charges in connection to the scandal, and work was done to rectify the violations and bring the terminal up to all safety and fire codes.

A major proponent of the airport's 2004–2006 expansion projects was Peter J. McGowan, then the Islip Town Supervisor; the new concourse was named after McGowan. The terminal was renamed the Veterans Memorial Concourse in homage to Long Island's distinction as home to more military veterans than almost any other community in the United States.

As part of the new terminal project, there was also a proposal was made to move the Big Duck – a historic structure and tourist attraction long associated with Long Island – to the new terminal from its original location in Flanders on the South Fork, at an estimated cost of at least $60,000. It was claimed that this move would both boost the number of visitors and help to publicize the new terminal building at the airport. Ultimately, the Big Duck was never relocated to MacArthur Airport, and on October 6, 2007, it was returned to its original location in Flanders.

In late September 2007, Ryanair, an ultra-low cost airline based in Ireland, proposed to fly between MacArthur Airport and its hub in Dublin, Ireland. The proposal was ultimately called off.

A new control tower was completed in 2010 and opened in 2011 to replace the tower built in the early 1960s, which had become functionally obsolete and had fallen into disrepair. In 2010, construction also began on a new Fuel Farm, which would the open the following year and increase the airport's jet fuel supply; it was built through a partnership between the Town of Islip and Southwest Airlines. Soon thereafter, the roadway in front of the terminal was reconfigured; another taxiway was also constructed along with other projects using FAA airport improvement program funds. Development of the West Side, home to a thriving general aviation sector, was to be underway in late 2010.

While the airport continues to expand, it has added numerous amenities – including free courtesy cell phone parking. In November 2009, MacArthur Airport became the only airport in the tri-state region to offer free wireless Internet service in the entire terminal and in the courtesy cell phone parking lot. In addition, the airport launched several tools designed to provide up-to-date information to travelers, including its first official website, flyLIMA.com.

In 2014, the airport opened an international arrivals & U.S. Customs facility for private plane passengers, which is able to accommodate non-U.S. Citizens.

In January 2016, plans were announced to build a U.S. Customs Station at MacArthur Airport for commercial flights, with help from financial assistance from New York State Governor Andrew Cuomo – an attempt at making MacArthur an international destination and at enticing airlines to add MacArthur to their destinations; the proposal had been discussed for a number of years by local, state, and federal officials. A marketing campaign for the airport was soon launched by the Town of Islip, including through advertisements on public transportation, digital marketing, and radio spots. Additionally, a new logo and slogan were unveiled.

Allegiant Air previously operated two weekly flights on a seasonal basis to Fort Myers/Punta Gorda, Florida using McDonnell Douglas MD-80s but no longer serves the airport. PenAir began operating two daily nonstop flights to Boston in July 2013, but stopped flying to MacArthur a year later. The last legacy carrier to serve Islip was American Airlines with Embraer ERJ-145 code share flights operated by its American Eagle Airlines regional affiliate Piedmont Airlines to Philadelphia. Service to Washington–National ended on July 2, 2014, after the merger between US Airways and American. The newly merged airline had to cut service to 17 cities from Washington–National because of an antitrust lawsuit preventing the airline from monopolizing slots at National Airport. American Airlines reapplied for nonstop service between MacArthur Airport and Washington–National when two slots opened up, but the airline lost the bid for both in early 2015.

In January 2017, the airport was used as the landing location for the aircraft carrying Joaquin "El Chapo" Guzman to New York with law enforcement agents for his prosecution, following his arrest and extradition to the United States from Mexico.

A Breeze Airways Airbus A220 at the terminal at MacArthur Airport in 2026

On July 17, 2017, Frontier Airlines announced service to 10 new cities using aircraft as large as the Airbus A321, which approaches the Boeing 757 in range and passenger capacity – a first for the airport in that past decade. Breeze Airways began service to and from the airport in 2022 and added additional routes in 2023.

In 2020, a new general aviation hangar opened at the airport. Ground was also broken that year on a new intermodal transportation facility.

In September 2022, American Airlines ended service to Islip citing a regional pilot shortage as the main reason behind the cut. Also taking place in 2022 was the opening of a new ground transportation center at the airport. This facility houses all of the rental car agencies present on-site at the airport.

In February 2023, the airport property was designated as a superfund site due to chemicals being detected in the soil and groundwater; negotiations between the New York State Department of Environmental Conservation and the Town of Islip soon started, with both parties working to ensure the site's cleanup.

Also taking place in February 2023 was the commencement of a major, $26 million terminal renovation project. The Airport received an additional $2.7 million in federal funds for further terminal renovations that June.

In February 2024, the Federal Aviation Administration approved the Town of Islip's plan to erect a new terminal on the north side of the airport, to be built as part of the Midway Crossing project. The $3.3 billion project will consist of a new terminal and parking facilities; the new terminal will be directly connected to the Ronkonkoma Long Island Rail Road station via a pedestrian walkway. The first phase of the terminal's construction will see the construction of eight gates.

In June 2024, JetBlue announced that it would commence service at MacArthur Airport, with flights set to begin that October. The airline's service at MacArthur Airport, by the end of 2024, became profitable faster than at any other airport it served. It would announce expand its operations at the airport and add additional destinations in 2025.

On March 11, 2025, Avelo Airlines announced service to MacArthur Airport, with flights beginning that May.

On May 29, 2025, Cape Air announced that it would commence service at MacArthur on July 3, with multiple daily flights between it and Boston.

In September 2026, RetrieveAir – a public charter airline offering travelers the ability to travel with their dogs and cats throughout the flight – announced that it would move its operations to MacArthur Airport from Republic Airport in nearby East Farmingdale, after outgrowing its existing facilities.

== Facilities ==
=== Runways and taxiways ===
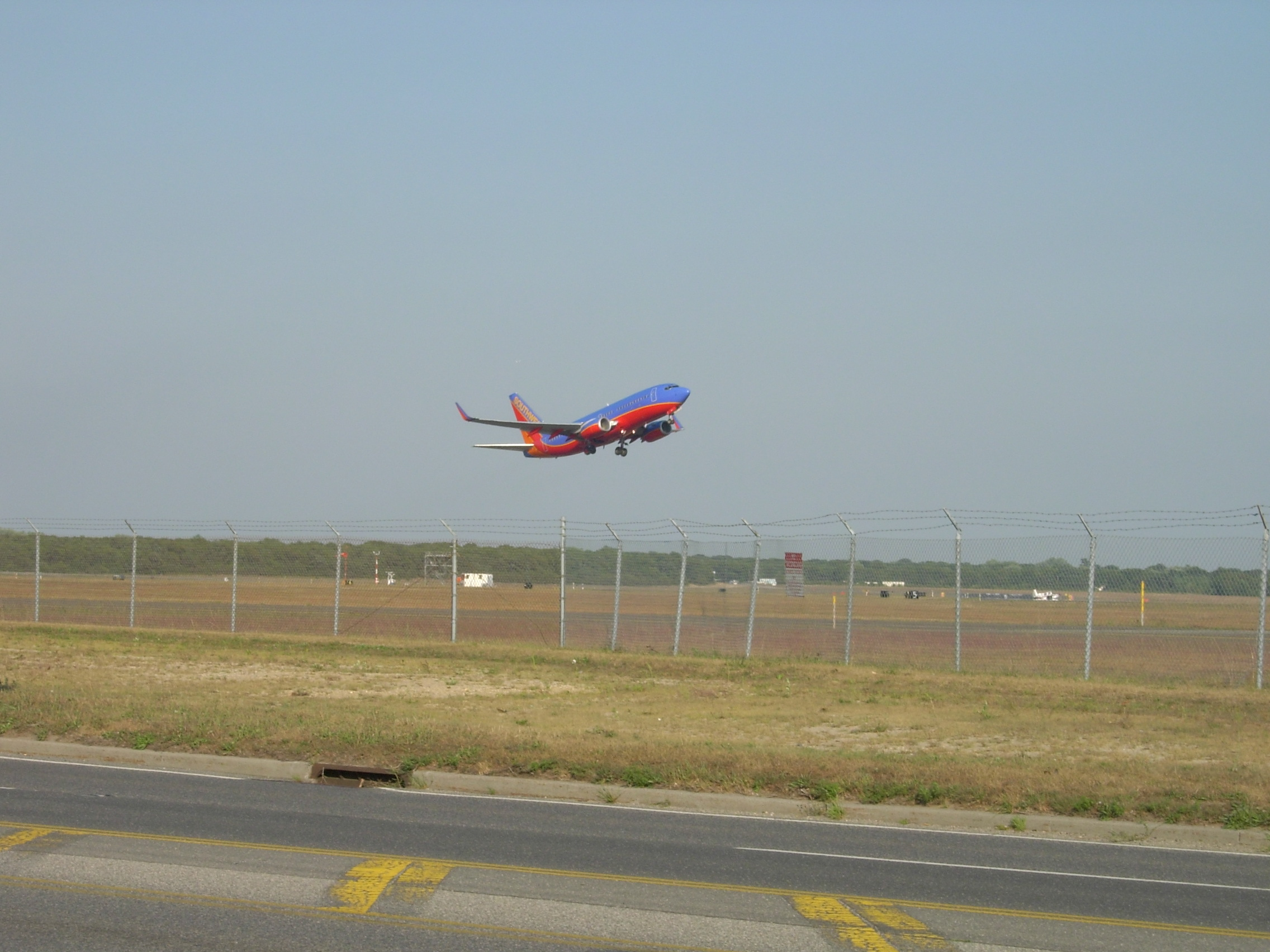
A Southwest Airlines Boeing 737-700 taking off from Runway 24

The airport covers 1,311 acres (531 ha) of land and, as of 2025, has three runways and two helipads:

Number	Length	Width	Notes
06/24	7,006 feet (2,135 m)	150 feet (46 m)	Equipped at both ends with an Instrument Landing System (ILS) and Approach Lighting Systems (ALS) with medium-intensity approach light system with runway alignment indicator lights (MALSR) – in addition to a precision approach path indicator (PAPI) Visual Glide Slope Indicator system. Glide slope is 3.00° (both ends). Instrument approach procedures are ILS, LOC, and RNAV (GPS) (06/24). The ILS category for Runway 06 is SA CAT I-II. Runway surface is grooved asphalt.
15R/33L	5,186 feet (1,581 m)	150 feet (46 m)	Equipped at both ends with a precision approach path indicator (PAPI) Visual Glide Slope Indicator system. Glide slope is 3.00° (15R) and 3.10° (33L). Runway surface is grooved asphalt.
15L/33R	3,175 feet (968 m)	75 feet (23 m)	Runway surface is asphalt.
~~10/28~~	~~5,034 feet (1,534 m)~~	~~150 feet (46 m)~~	Runway closed in the late 2010s. Runway 28 was equipped with a visual approach slope indicator (VASI) Visual Glide Slope Indicator system. Runway surface was asphalt.
Helipad H1	50 feet (15 m)	50 feet (15 m)	Helipad surface is asphalt.
Helipad H2	50 feet (15 m)	50 feet (15 m)	Helipad surface is asphalt.

=== Terminal ===
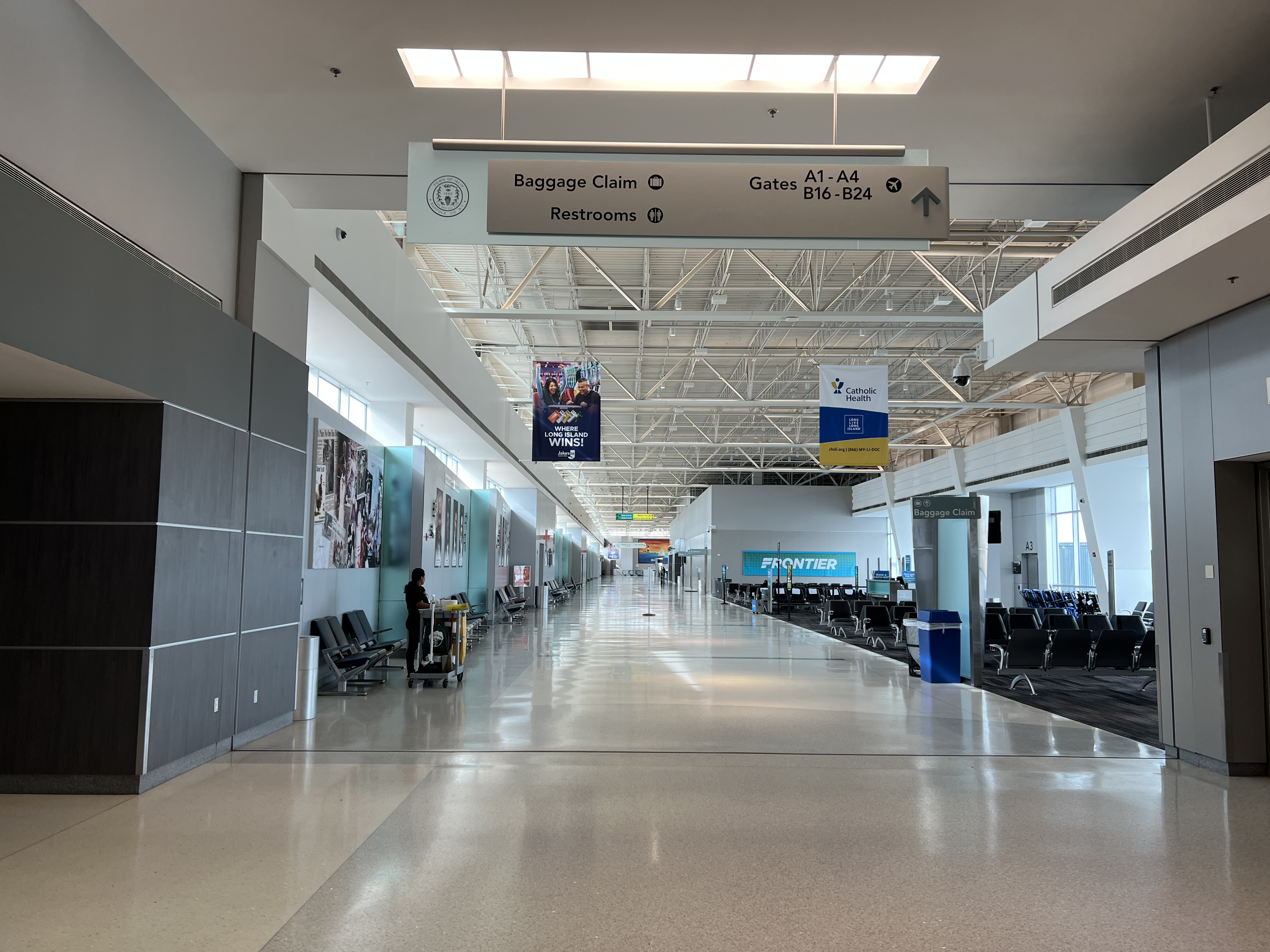
Concourse A in February 2023

MacArthur Airport’s original terminal opened in 1966. The terminal was expanded between 1989 and 1990, with the creation of two concourses with two gates each. In 2004, construction commenced on the current terminal through an expansion and renovation project funded by Southwest Airlines; the terminal expansion was built off and replaced portions of the existing 1966 terminal, while other, existing portions were renovated.

Additionally, the radio station WRCN-FM maintains its offices and studios within the airport.

=== Air navigation ===
MacArthur Airport has a 158-foot (48 m) control tower, located on the south side of the airport. The tower, which replaced one built in the early 1960s, was built at a cost of roughly $20 million (2010 USD) and includes a 525-square-foot (48.8 m^{2}) control cab.

The airport is also equipped with an Automated Surface Observing System (ASOS) for weather forecasting, in addition to having an Automatic Terminal Information Service (ATIS).

Furthermore, the New York Air Route Traffic Control Center (ZNY) – known as an ARTCC for short – is located on the grounds of the airport.

=== General aviation ===
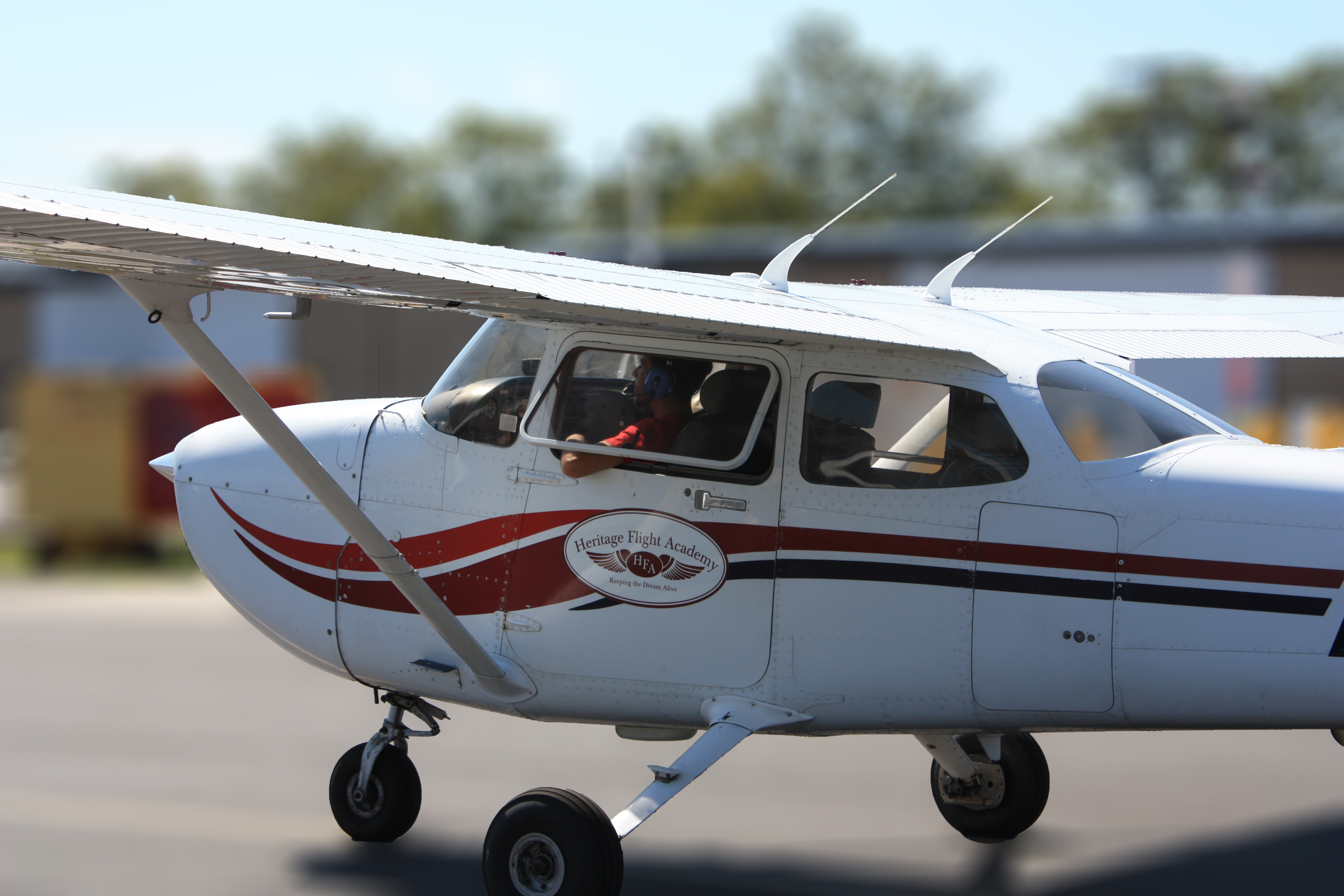
A Heritage Flight Academy Cessna 172 at the airport

Long Island MacArthur Airport's houses numerous general aviation tenants and buildings. Tenants include Sheltair Aviation and ExcelAire – the latter of which is headquartered at the airport – as well as numerous flight schools, such as ATP Flight School.

=== New York Army National Guard Aviation Regiment ===
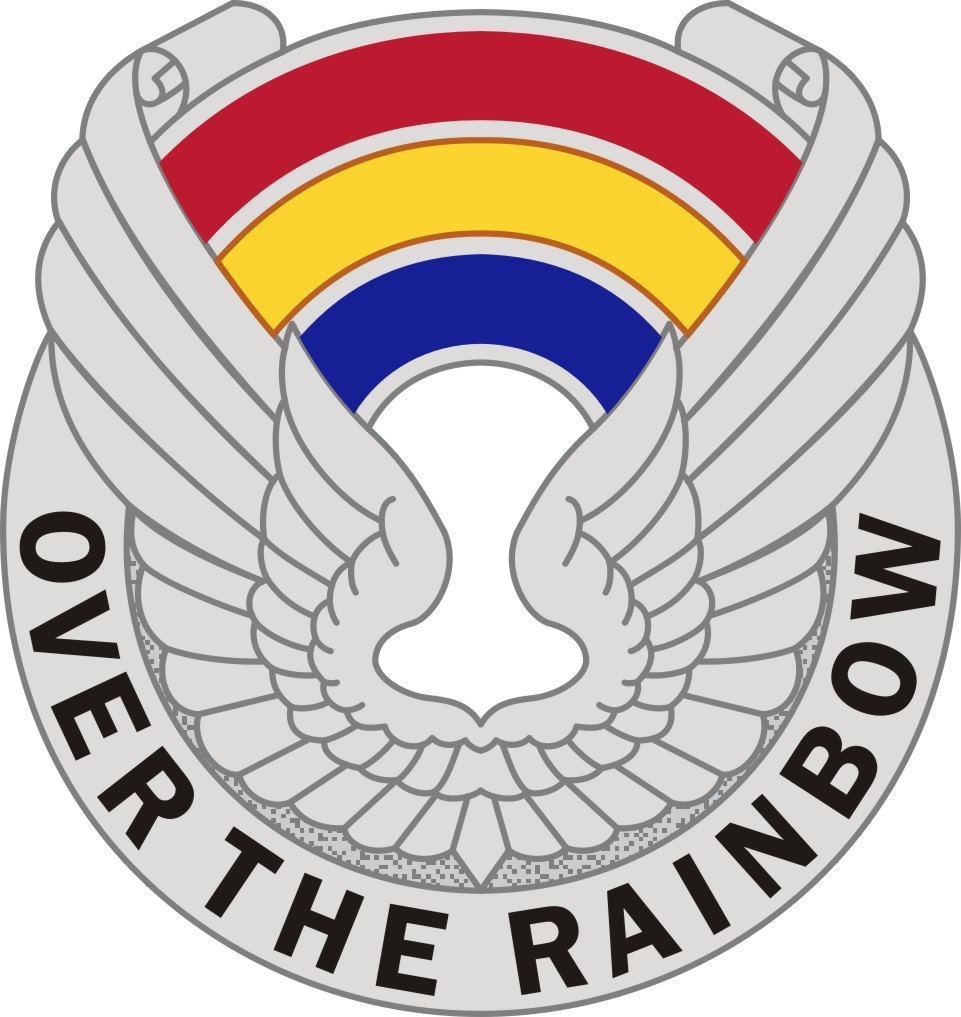
142nd Aviation Regiment insignia

The 3rd Battalion (Assault Helicopter), 142nd Aviation Regiment of the New York Army National Guard, equipped with Sikorsky UH-60M Black Hawk helicopters, is headquartered at MacArthur Airport. The regiment is part of the larger 42nd Combat Aviation Brigade and 42nd Infantry Division. Until the early 1990s, the 2nd Battalion (Attack) of the regiment was based at MacArthur Airport, equipped with Bell Helicopter AH-1 Cobra (F model) gunships. In 2006, the 3rd Battalion (Assault), 142nd Aviation Regiment moved its headquarters from Latham, New York to Long Island MacArthur Airport, bringing its Black Hawk helicopters. In May 2007, following yet another reorganization in which the battalion was re-configured, the unit received its mobilization alert order to participate in Operation Iraqi Freedom. Over the course of their deployment, the unit – which came to be known as Task Force Jester – flew more than 15,000 flight hours. The last of the battalion's troops returned home to Long Island MacArthur Airport in May 2009. An Army Aviation Support Facility is also housed at the airport.

=== Suffolk County Police Department Aviation Unit ===
The Suffolk County Police Department (SCPD) Aviation Section has a law enforcement and MEDEVAC helicopter based at MacArthur Airport. The base is staffed 24 hours a day by police pilots, as well as flight paramedics employed by the Stony Brook University Medical Center.

=== Civil Air Patrol ===
The airport is also home to Civil Air Patrol's Long Island Group's Suffolk Cadet Squadron 10.

=== Jet fuel farm ===
The airport has a jet fuel farm with a maximum storage capacity of 300,000 gallons of jet fuel.

== Airport operations ==
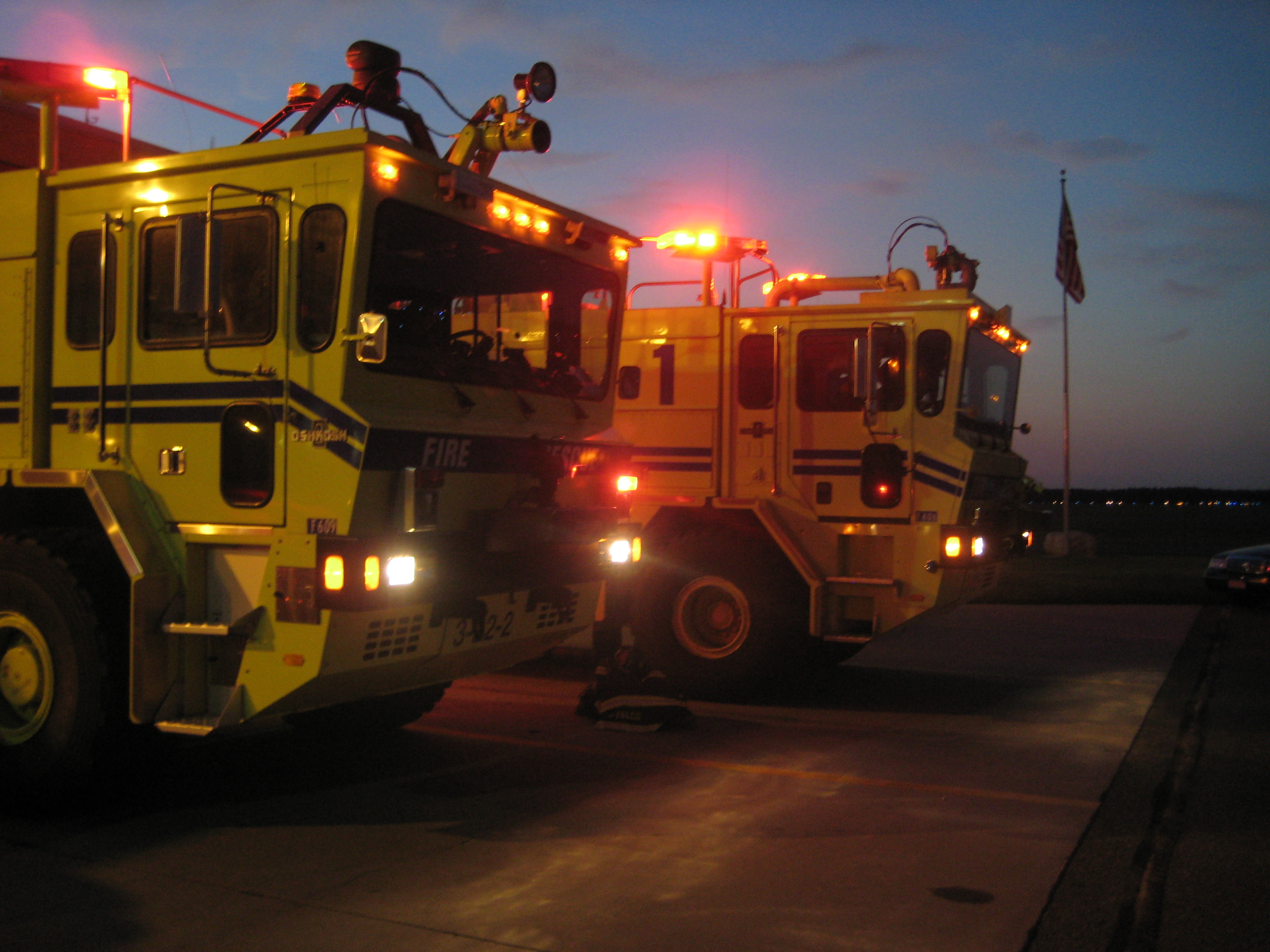
Two of the airport's crash response trucks in 2008

Long Island MacArthur Airport's airspace is designated as class C with a ceiling 4,100 feet (1,200 m) above mean sea level when the airport's control tower is staffed. Between midnight and 6:00 AM, when the control tower is closed, the airport's airspace reverts to class E.

At night, Runway 15L/33R – the airport's smallest and narrowest runway – is not used for takeoffs or landings.

All passenger food catering within the airport terminal is provided by HMSHost.

=== Airport administration ===
Long Island MacArthur Airport is owned by the Town of Islip and is operated by the Town of Islip Department of Aviation. The department is led by the Commissioner of Aviation and Transportation, which works closely with the Islip Town Council to manage & operate the airport. The Department of Aviation's divisions include Airport Operations, Custodial, Fire Rescue, Law Enforcement, Maintenance, Construction, and Administration.

As of May 2025, the Commissioner of Aviation and Transportation is Rob Schneider.

== Access ==
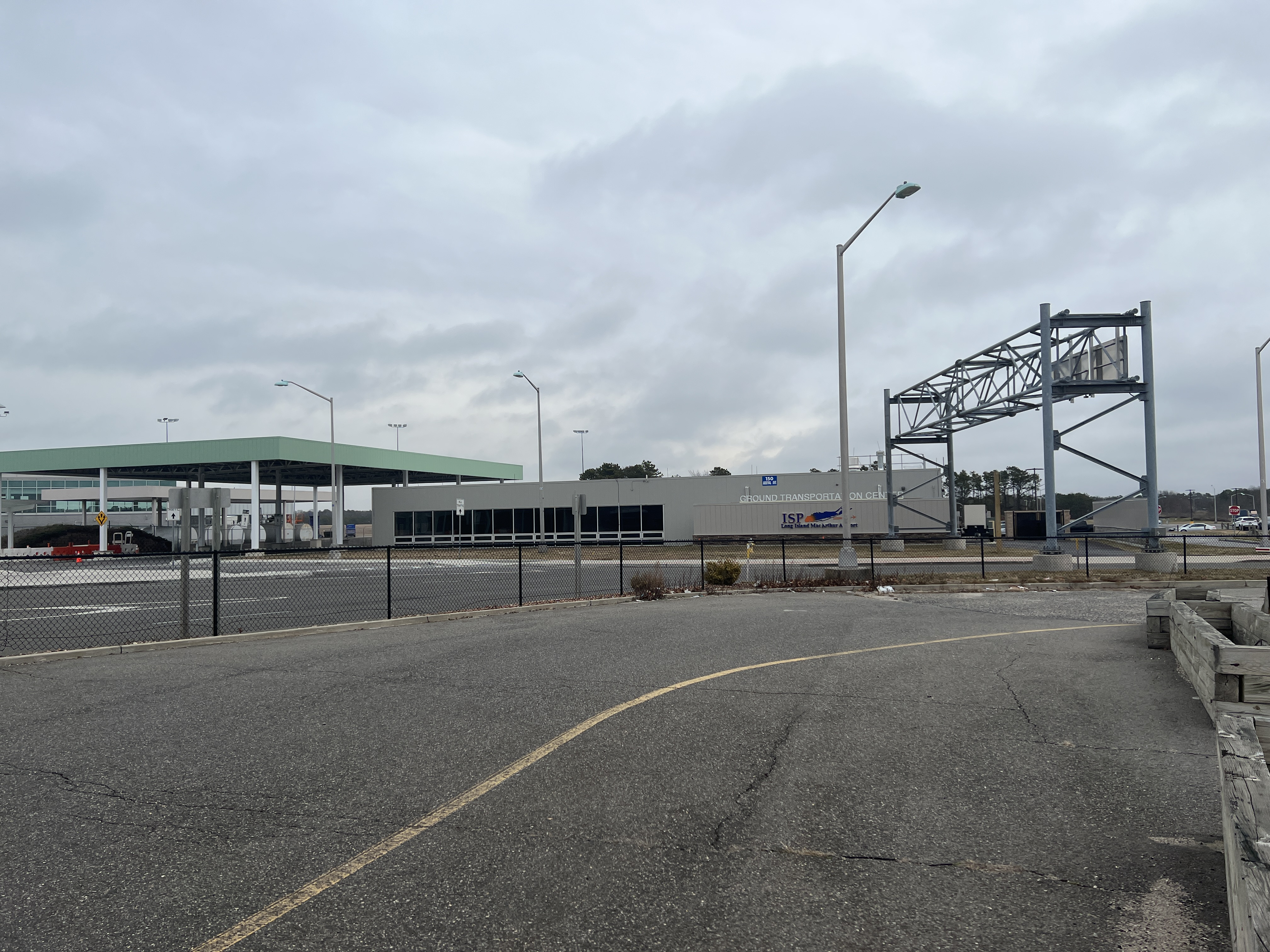
The airport's Ground Transportation Center in February 2023

=== Car ===
MacArthur Airport's terminal is accessible from Veterans Memorial Highway (NY 454) via Johnson Avenue. It is also accessible from the Long Island Expressway (I-495) via Exits 57, 59, and 60, as well as from Sunrise Highway (NY 27) via Exit 49.

=== Public transportation ===
==== Bus ====
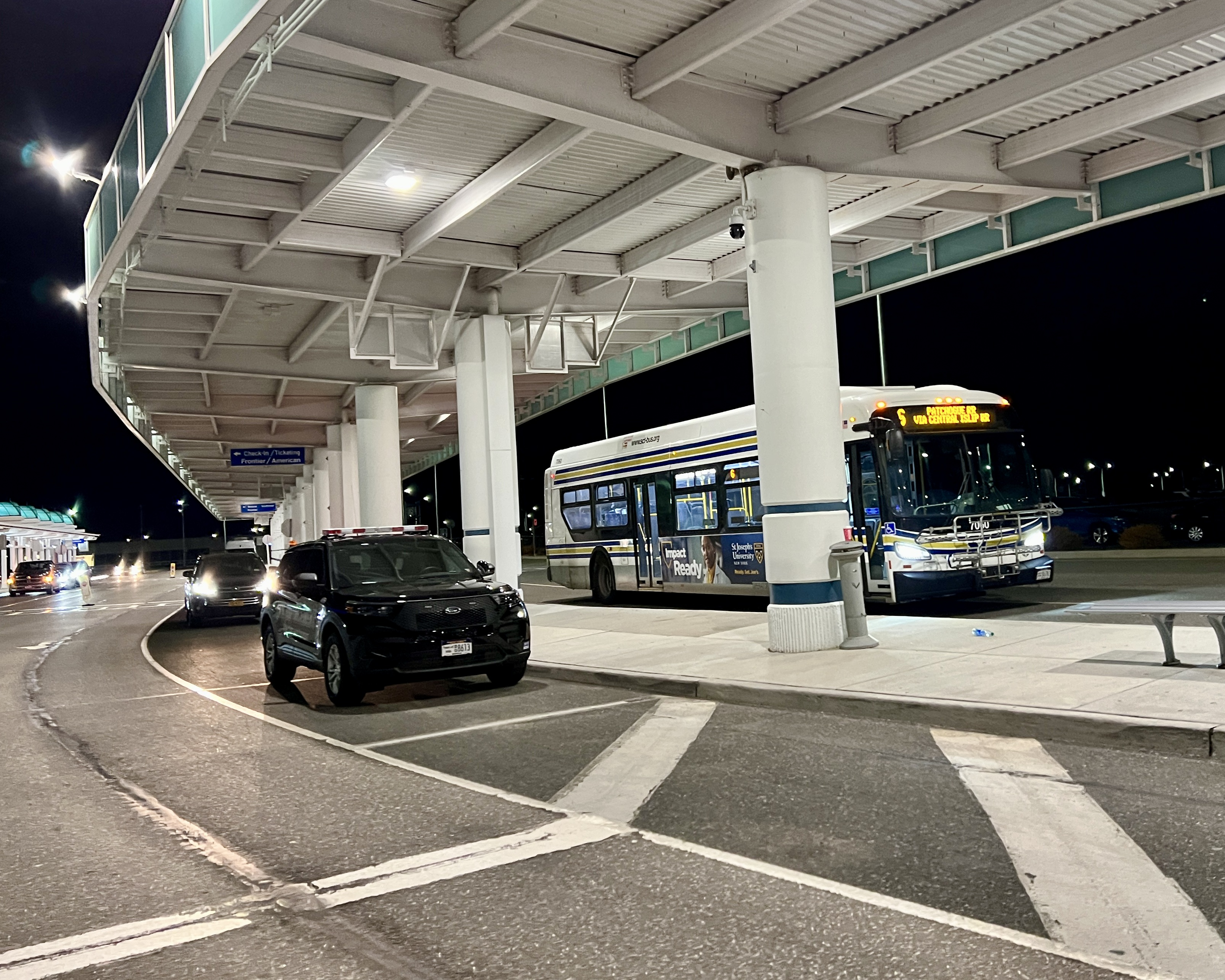
A Suffolk Transit bus stopped at the terminal in December 2023

Bus connections
System	Route(s)	Refs
Suffolk County Transit	6	

Suffolk Transit's Route 6 bus route serves the airport, connecting it with the Walt Whitman Mall in Huntington Station to the west, and the Patchogue LIRR station in Patchogue to the east. Route 6 also stops at the Central Islip LIRR station.

The Hampton Jitney's Westhampton, Montauk, and North Fork lines stop along the Long Island Expressway (I-495) at Exit 60. Known as the Islip Airport Connection, the stop is a short taxicab ride away from the airport terminal.

==== Rail ====
Rail connections
System	Station	Line(s)	Refs
Long Island Rail Road	Ronkonkoma	Ronkonkoma Branch	
Long Island Rail Road	Central Islip via SCT RT 6	Ronkonkoma Branch	
Long Island Rail Road	Patchogue via SCT RT 6	Montauk Branch	

MacArthur Airport is connected with the Long Island Rail Road's adjacent Ronkonkoma station by shuttles and taxi service. The LIRR offers passengers transportation to nearby New York City. Additionally, Amtrak's Northeast Regional will begin serving the Ronkonkoma LIRR station – and thus the airport – in or about 2028, providing MacArthur Airport with inter-city rail service.

The Central Islip and Patchogue stations are also accessible from the airport, via Suffolk County Transit's Route 6 bus route.

== Future developments ==
=== New terminal ===
A new passenger terminal will be constructed on the north side of the airport. The project will see the erection of a new airport terminal and parking facilities; the new terminal will be directly connected to the Ronkonkoma Long Island Rail Road station via a pedestrian walkway. The first phase of the new terminal's construction will include the construction of eight gates, in addition to a new, adjacent apron and taxiways linking the new facility with the existing taxiways and runways. An alternative plan by the town would retain, expand, and upgrade the existing terminal, and build a direct connection linking the terminal and the Ronkonkoma station.

In February 2025, New York state announced it is investing $150 million into the construction of the pedestrian connection between the train station and the new airport terminal. Two months later, on April 7, the Town of Islip issued a request for qualifications for the new terminal, which will be constructed and operated by a private developer.

In May 2025, it was announced that the Town of Islip aimed to select a final developer by early 2026, with construction anticipated to commence during the first quarter of 2027. The Islip Town Council – in a planning dispute – voted 3-to-2 in early July 2026 to withhold $250,000 in funds earmarked for external financial, legal, and planning consultants for the project, while negotiations are underway.

On July 20, 2026, Islip officials announced that the town has selected a joint venture between RXR Realty and airport operator Avports as its preferred developer for the project.

=== Amtrak service ===
In January 2025, it was announced that Amtrak will establish a new Northeast Regional route on Long Island, terminating at the Ronkonkoma LIRR station, thereby providing MacArthur Airport with inter-city rail service. At the time of the announcement, it was stated that work was anticipated begin in 2026, with Amtrak service commencing two years later, in 2028.

In 2026, the Metropolitan Transportation Authority and New York state announced further upgrades along the Ronkonkoma Branch – including grade crossing eliminations – will be completed, coinciding with the Amtrak plans.

== Airlines and destinations ==
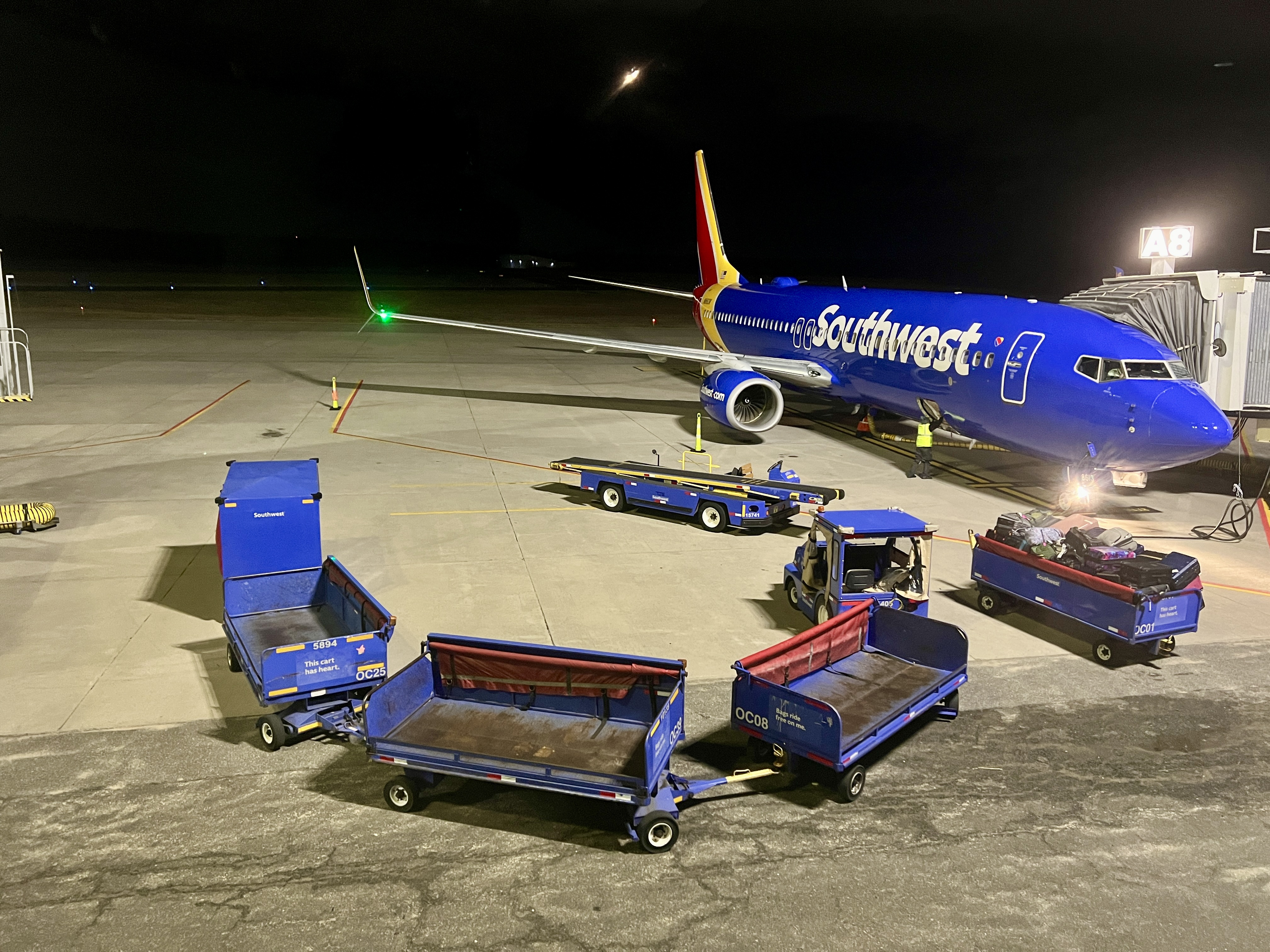
A Southwest Airlines Boeing 737-800 at the passenger terminal in 2023

=== Passenger ===
Airlines	Destinations
Avelo Airlines	Seasonal: Charlotte/Concord
Breeze Airways	Charleston (SC), Fort Myers, Myrtle Beach, Norfolk, Raleigh/Durham, Tampa (begins January 6, 2027), Vero Beach, Wilmington (NC); Seasonal: Richmond, Sarasota
Cape Air	Seasonal: Boston
Frontier Airlines	Orlando
JetBlue	Fort Lauderdale, Orlando, West Palm Beach; Seasonal: Fort Myers, Tampa
Southwest Airlines	Baltimore, Orlando, Tampa, West Palm Beach

== Statistics ==
=== Annual traffic ===
Annual passenger traffic at ISP, 2002–present
Year	Passengers	Year	Passengers	Year	Passengers	Year	Passengers	Year	Passengers
2002	1,840,000	2009	1,863,000	2016	1,192,000	2023	1,278,000	2030	
2003	1,897,000	2010	1,721,000	2017	1,292,000	2024	1,362,000	2031	
2004	1,983,000	2011	1,556,000	2018	1,618,000	2025	1,580,000	2032	
2005	2,121,000	2012	1,330,000	2019	1,545,000	2026		2033	
2006	2,284,000	2013	1,323,000	2020	530,000	2027		2034	
2007	2,337,000	2014	1,294,000	2021	1,105,000	2028		2035	
2008	2,091,000	2015	1,207,000	2022	1,224,000	2029		2036	

=== Airline Market Share ===
Largest airlines at ISP (July 2025 - June 2026)
1. Southwest, 655,000 (41.6%)
2. JetBlue, 380,000 (24.1%)
3. Frontier, 261,000 (16.6%)
4. Breeze, 208,000 (13.2%)
5. Avelo, 63,180 (4.01%)
6. Cape Air, 6,800 (0.43%)

=== Top destinations ===
Busiest domestic routes from ISP (June 2025 - May 2026)
Rank	City	Passengers	Carriers
1	Orlando–International, Florida	204,600	Frontier, JetBlue, Southwest
2	West Palm Beach, Florida	161,360	Frontier, JetBlue, Southwest
3	Baltimore, Maryland	133,840	Southwest
4	Tampa, Florida	65,780	Frontier, JetBlue, Southwest
5	Fort Lauderdale, Florida	49,910	Frontier, JetBlue
6	Fort Myers, Florida	37,590	Breeze, Frontier, JetBlue
7	Concord, North Carolina	20,640	Avelo
8	Myrtle Beach, South Carolina	17,850	Frontier
9	Vero Beach, Florida	17,170	Breeze
10	Wilmington, North Carolina	15,610	Breeze

== Accidents and incidents ==
- On April 4, 1955, a Douglas DC-6 of United Airlines operating on a pilot test flight bound for LaGuardia Airport lost control soon after take-off and subsequently crashed, killing all three crew members on board.
- On November 23, 1999, a U.S. Army National Guard UH-1H "Huey" helicopter crashed in fog during an attempted landing after training exercises above eastern Long Island; two were killed and two were injured.
- On July 25, 2008, a bomb threat was received for Southwest Airlines Flight 2622, bound for Chicago–Midway. Subsequently, Concourse A was evacuated for several hours and a thorough search of the airplane and building commenced. No dangerous items were found.
- On June 5, 2010, a Beechcraft Musketeer carrying a student pilot and instructor crashed into a commercial building just after taking off, bursting into flames. The aircraft was destroyed in the fire, and both of the plane's occupants received injuries and burns.
- On January 7, 2011, a Bombardier Dash 8-100 operating as Piedmont Airlines Flight 4507 on behalf of American Airlines, with service from Philadelphia International Airport to Tweed New Haven Airport, had to divert to MacArthur after being struck by lightning over the Long Island Sound, causing electrical problems. The 33 passengers that were onboard were bused to New Haven.
- On November 1, 2018, Frontier Airlines Flight 1851, an Airbus A321 bound for Myrtle Beach, SC, made an emergency landing at MacArthur Airport shortly after taking off from it, due to fumes in the cabin of the aircraft. Thirteen of the occupants onboard were treated by medical personnel; two passengers and a crew member were subsequently transported to a nearby hospital for further treatment.
- On February 3, 2022, a Pilatus PC12 collided with a Hawker 1000 on the ramp. No one was injured.
- On October 28, 2023, a Robinson R22 helicopter crashed at the airport. There were no injuries.
- On July 22, 2024, a Beechcraft Bonanza crashed shortly after taking off from Runway 6, killing the pilot and his passenger.

== In popular culture ==
Over the years, Long Island MacArthur Airport has been used several times as a filming location.

In the 1970 film The Out-of-Towners, the airport scene – in which George Kellerman played by Jack Lemmon and his wife Gwen played by Sandy Dennis depart Ohio for New York – was filmed at MacArthur. In 2008, several scenes for the independent film Every Day, starring Helen Hunt, Liev Schreiber, and Brian Dennehy were shot at the airport. Scenes for the 2010 FX comedy Louie were also filmed at MacArthur. In 2011, Sean Paul's music video "She Doesn't Mind" was filmed at the airport. One year later, in 2012, part of the movie Non-Stop was filmed in various locations at ISP. Two years later, in 2014, scenes from Ricki and the Flash were filmed at the airport.

== Foreign trade zone ==
Adjacent to the airport – and directly connected thereto – is the Town of Islip Foreign Trade Zone (also known as the Foreign Trade Zone at MacArthur Airport and the Islip Foreign Trade Zone). The only designated foreign trade zone on Long Island outside of New York City, the industrial & business park is owned by the Town of Islip and managed by – and leased to – the Town of Islip Foreign Trade Zone Authority. It is a magnet site for Foreign Trade Zone 52.

The Islip Foreign Trade Zone was established in 1982. It is located on 52 acres (21 ha) of land. As of 2024, it consists of 14 buildings and has roughly 435,000 square feet (40,400 m^{2}) of office & warehouse space.

== See also ==
- Aviation in the New York metropolitan area
- List of airports in New York (state)
- List of Class C airports in the United States
- Transportation on Long Island
- Bayport Aerodrome
- Westchester County Airport
