= Debonair (airline) =

British airline

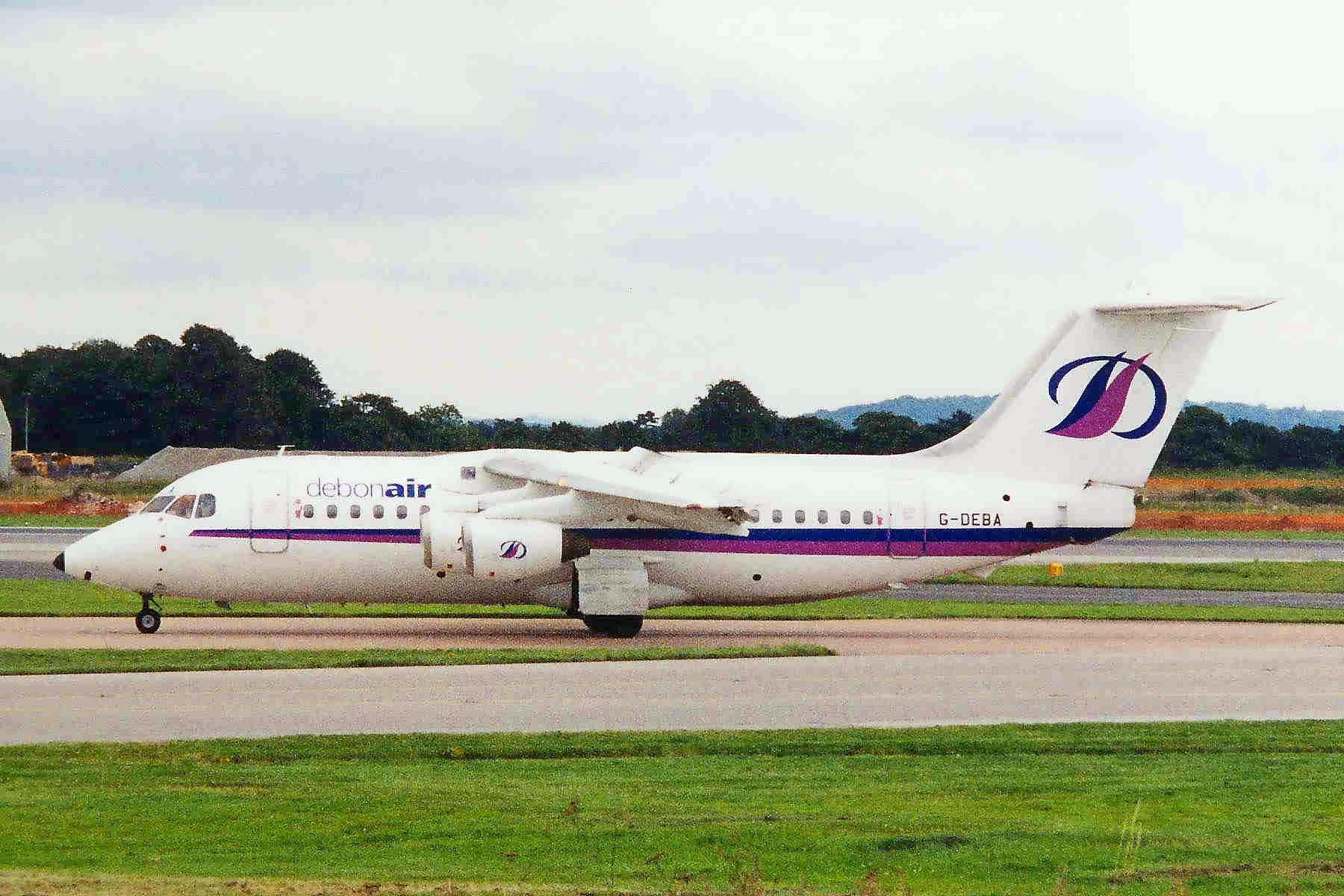
- BAE 146-200
| IATA | ICAO | Call sign |
|---|---|---|
| 2G | DEB | DEBONAIR |
- Founded: August 1995
- Commenced operations: 19 June 1996
- Ceased operations: 1 October 1999
- Hubs: Luton Airport
- Frequent-flyer program: Destinations
- Fleet size: 13 (at closure)
- Headquarters: Luton Airport, England
- Key people: Franco Mancassola (CEO); Silvio Petrassi (general manager)
- Employees: 480 (at closure)
- Website: www.debonair.co.uk

Debonair was a British airline headquartered at Luton Airport offering flights to and from Spain, France, Germany and Italy . It ceased operations in October 1999 due to financial difficulties.

== History ==
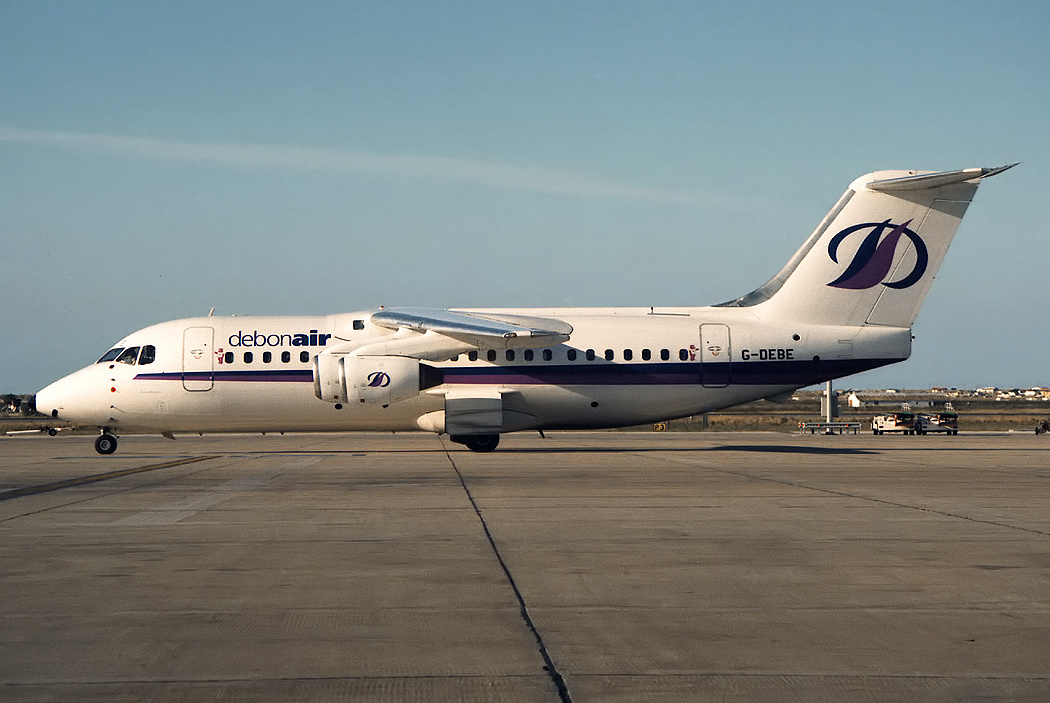
British Aerospace 146 at Faro Airport in 1997

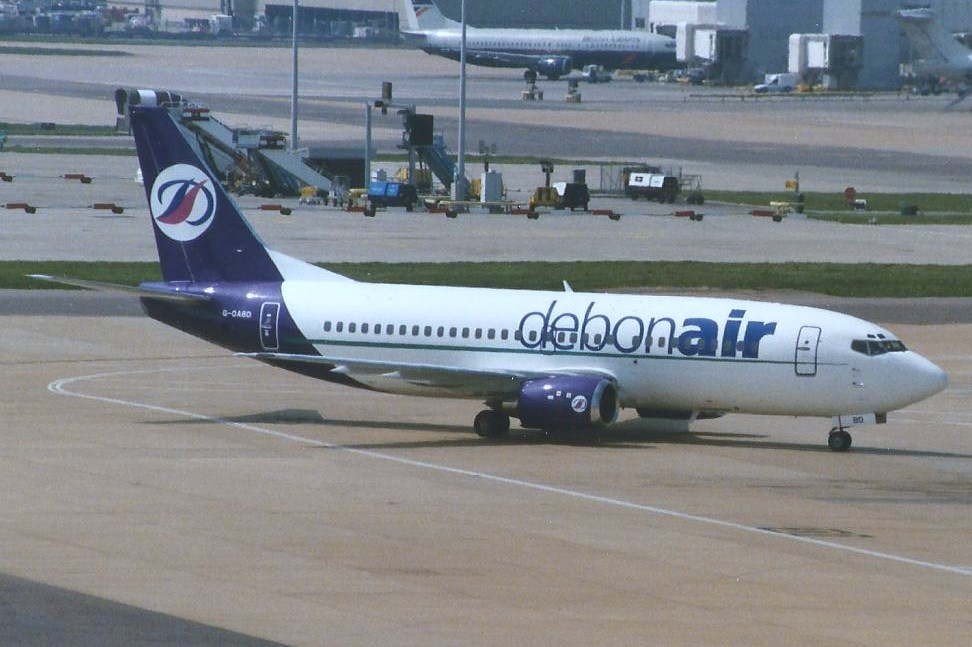
Boeing 737-300 at Gatwick Airport in 1999

Debonair was founded by Franco Mancassola who had previously worked for Continental Airlines, and founded Discovery Airways in Hawaii. The company was established in August 1995 as Valuair Europe but changed to Debonair on 20 December of the same year.

Debonair's first flights took off on June 19, with weekday daily flights to Munich, Mönchengladbach and Barcelona from Luton Airport. From July, Debonair also added a Madrid route alongside Newcastle and Copenhagen, and later in November a direct London Luton to Rome flight.

It floated shares on the Easdaq in September 1997 and raised $41.9 million. By mid-1998, the airline was on a heavy cost-cutting strategy which was beginning to slow the losses compared with the year prior. Although at the same time, Debonair sought to introduce special services for its frequent flyer programme including fast track boarding and inclusive meals onboard and on some routes its ABC - Affordable Business Class product. Debonair appealed to business travellers, who made up 58 percent of its passengers by 1998. In late 1998, Debonair entered a working relationship with Lufthansa, leasing five aircraft for their CityLine operations from Munich. Whilst the aircraft were in Lufthansa colours, the flights were in the hands of Debonair staff. Debonair also entered a similar agreement with Swissair who were launching their Express brand to operate a BAe 146 on their behalf from Zurich to Venice and Bologna.

Debonair also maintained a codeshare agreement with AB Airlines, which resulted in the lease of a Boeing 737-300 from January 1999 remaining in service until Debonair's operations ended.

On 1 October 1999 the airline's shares were suspended, and the following day the operations of Debonair were grounded following a court ruling to appoint Deloitte as administrators. At the time of closure, the airline had just embarked on a new national advertising campaign, which was pulled from the media at the last minute. However, some advertising made it onto London Underground trains. Following the closure of Debonair, founder Mancassola was critical of British Airways subsidiary Go as a cause for the airlines demise.

== Fleet ==
At the time of closure, the fleet consisted of the following aircraft:

| Aircraft | In service | Orders | Passengers | | |
| Aircraft | In service | Orders | CY | Y | Total |
|---|---|---|---|---|---|
| Boeing 737-300 | 1 | — | – | 139 | 139 |
| BAE 146-100 | 2 | — | 77 | – | 77 |
| BAE 146-200 | 5 | — | 80 | – | 80 |
| BAE 146-200 | 4 | — | 82 | – | 82 |
| BAE 146-200 | 1 | — | – | 96 | 96 |
| Total | 13 | — | | | |

=== Previous fleet ===
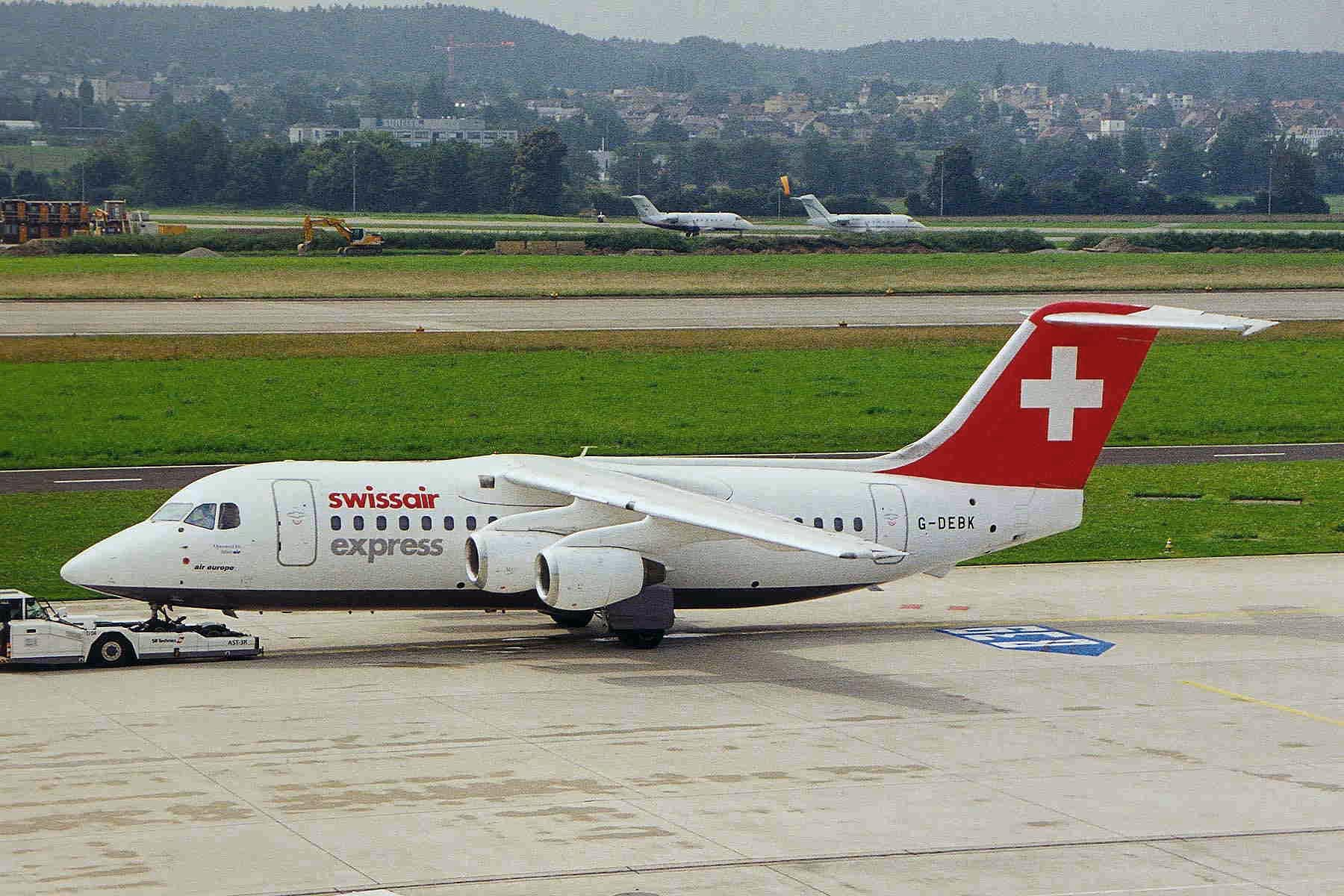
Swissair Express operated by Debonair at Zurich Airport in 1999

| Aircraft | Total | Introduced | Retired | Remarks |
|---|---|---|---|---|
| Boeing 737-300 | 2 | 1998 | 1999 | Leased from AB Airlines |
| BAC 1-11 | 1 | 1999 | 1999 | Leased from European Aviation |
| Fokker 50 | 1 | 1998 | 1999 | Leased from Denim Air |
| BAE 146-100 | 1 | 1997 | 1997 | Leased from Flightline |
