= Peter McGowan =

American politician

Peter J. McGowan

Town of Islip Supervisor
- Succeeded by: Jeanette Messina

Personal details
- Born: October 27, 1936
- Died: October 13, 2020 (aged 83)
- Party: Republican

Peter "Pete" J. McGowan was a former New York politician, who served as Town Supervisor of the Town of Islip on Long Island.

== Biography ==
In March 2006, he resigned and pleaded guilty to charges of receiving a bribe, grand larceny, and offering a false instrument for filing — taking kickbacks and stealing from his campaign account. On May 4, 2006, he was sentenced to three months in jail, followed by probation and community service.

In 2001, he was involved with a controversial proposal to impose a $50,000 fee on airplanes landing or taking off from the town's Long Island MacArthur Airport after 11 p.m. and before 6:30 a.m., although the proposed fee was later withdrawn. The airport's concourse was named after him but was later renamed the Veterans Memorial Concourse.

In September 2005, town officials condemned the Fairwood Gardens apartment building and issued eviction orders to its tenants to leave, but later withdrew the eviction orders and subsequently settled out of court a lawsuit brought by some tenants. At the time, McGowan denied knowing in advance about the evictions.

He clashed with other council members over the issue of the town's term limits, which they supported and he opposed.

Peter McGowan died at 83 on 13 October 2020.
