= Discovery Airways =

Inter-island airline in Hawaii

IATA	ICAO	Call sign
DH	DVA	DISCOVERY AIRWAYS
- Founded: 1989; 37 years ago
- Commenced operations: March 25, 1990; 36 years ago
- Ceased operations: July 13, 1990; 36 years ago
- Hubs: Honolulu International Airport
- Fleet size: 5
- Destinations: 4

Discovery Airways was an airline that provided inter-island service within the state of Hawaii in March 1990. It closed three months later in July 1990 after it was accused of violating a law that states that airlines in the United States must be controlled by American citizens.

== History ==
Formed in 1989 by former Continental Airlines manager and Mid Pacific Air Director of Marketing Franco Mancassola, the airline operated flights from Honolulu to Kahului, Lihue, and Kona.

After plans for the airline were announced, competing carriers Aloha Airlines and Hawaiian Airlines and their unions filed objections with the United States Department of Transportation (DoT), requesting further investigation of the airline's ownership. 75% of the company's stock was owned by Phillip Ho, chairman of the airline and head of Nansay Hawaii, a Japanese real estate development firm. Mancassola, an Italian citizen, controlled 15% of the company. British Aerospace, supplier of the airline's BAe 146 aircraft, contributed $2.5 million, and Nansay provided up to $12 million in loans. The DoT issued a nine-month provisional certificate, giving the airline time to prove it was controlled by American interests. Flights began on March 25, 1990.

Ho refused to appear before the DOT without a subpoena and was ultimately unable to prove American citizenship. Discovery Airways was ordered to cease operations within one week on July 6, and the airline shut down on July 13. An attempt to sell Ho's interest was ruled insufficient since much of the airline's start-up financing was Japanese, and the airline was sold later in the year to K P Harvest. In August 1991, the airline filed for Chapter 7 bankruptcy after K P Harvest itself went bankrupt.

Mancassola went on to start Debonair in the United Kingdom in 1996, which also operated the BAe 146 and featured the same livery and logo on its aircraft as Discovery.

== Destinations ==
=== United States ===
- Hawaii
  - Honolulu (Honolulu International Airport)
  - Kahului (Kahului Airport)
  - Kona (Kona International Airport)
  - Lihue (Lihue Airport)

== Fleet ==
Prior to starting service, the airline had orders for twelve British Aerospace BAe 146 aircraft with options on two additional aircraft. Ultimately, Discovery operated a total of five aircraft. After shutdown these aircraft were later leased to Business Express Airlines.

Discovery Airways fleet
Aircraft	Total	Passengers (First/Economy)
BAe 146-200A	5	96 (8/88)

== See also ==
- List of defunct airlines of the United States

== Bibliography ==
- Forman, Peter N. (2005). Wings of Paradise: Hawaii's Incomparable Airlines. Kailua, Hawaii: Barnstormer Books. pp. 307–308. ISBN 978-0-9701594-4-1. OCLC 70247710.
- Norwood, Tom W. (2006). Deregulation Knockouts, Round Two. Sandpoint, Idaho: Airways International. pp. 35, 139, 147. OCLC 77065792. ISBN 0-9653993-2-2.
