= Mall Airways =

American regional airline

| IATA | ICAO | Call sign |
|---|---|---|
| FH | - | - |
- Commenced operations: 1973; 53 years ago
- Ceased operations: September 1989; 36 years ago
- Fleet size: See Fleet below
- Destinations: See Destinations served below
- Headquarters: Albany, New York, United States

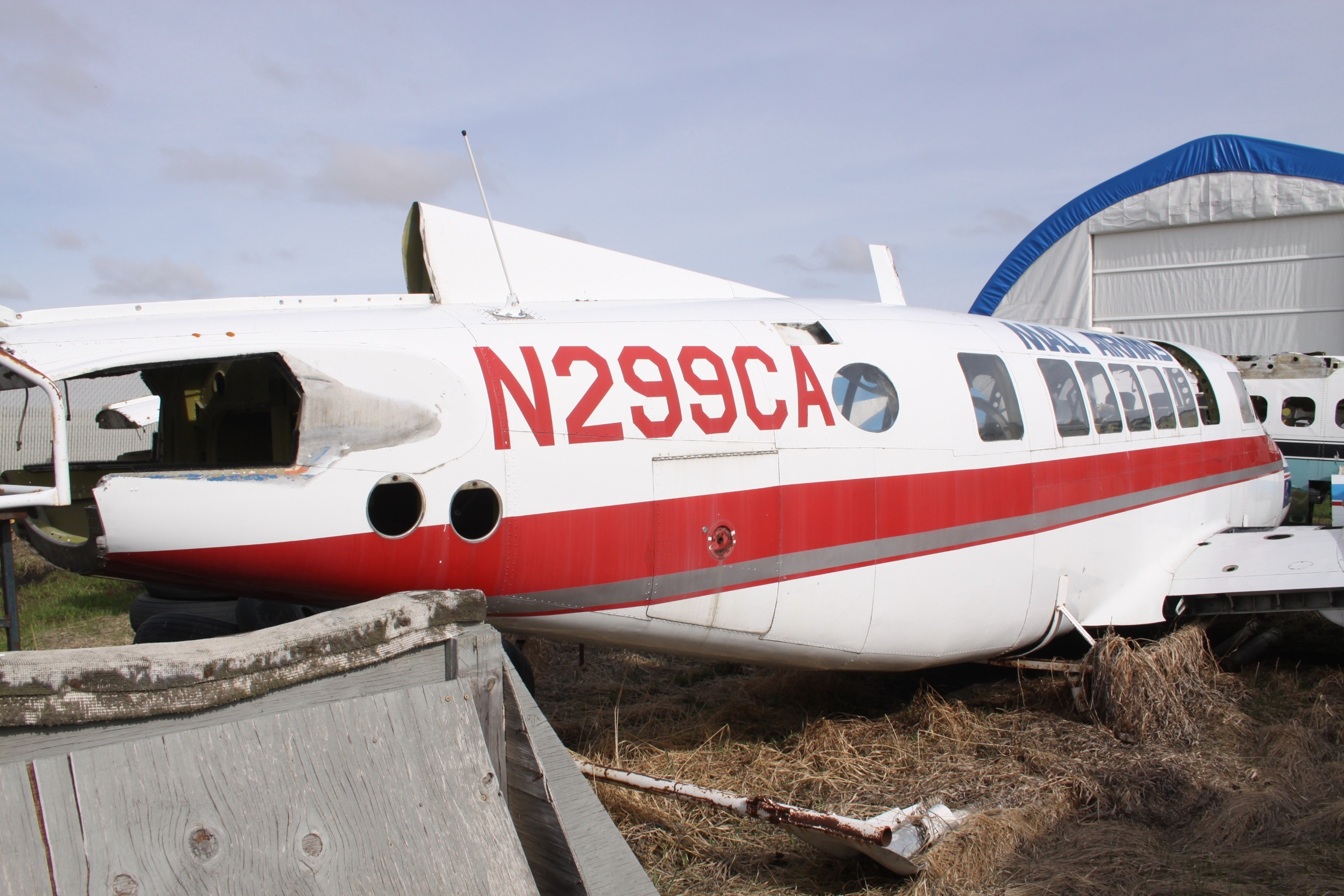
Mall Airways Beechcraft Model 99 (N299CA) stored at Calgary/ Springbank Airport

Mall Airways was an American regional airline which operated throughout the northeastern United States and eastern Canada from 1973 to 1989. The carrier operated a mixed fleet of Beechcraft 1900, Piper Navajo Chieftains, Beech 99 Airliners, and also occasionally utilized a Beech King Air 90 as a back-up aircraft. The airline was based in Albany, New York, and was acquired by Business Express Airlines in September, 1989. Business Express retained both BE1900C, N15394 and N15503.

In 1988, the airline was forced to suspend its ground operations by the Federal Aviation Administration after the FAA found that the airline had unkept operations records. NTSB records suggest that this was in relation to fraudulent pilot training records.

== Destinations served ==
- Connecticut
  - Hartford (Bradley International Airport)
- New Jersey
  - Newark (Newark Liberty International Airport)
  - Atlantic City, New Jersey
- New York
  - Albany (Albany International Airport)
  - Binghamton (Greater Binghamton Airport)
  - Buffalo (Buffalo Niagara International Airport)
  - Elmira (Elmira-Corning Regional Airport)
  - Islip (Long Island MacArthur Airport)
  - Ithaca (Ithaca Tompkins Regional Airport)
  - New York (LaGuardia Airport)
  - Rochester (Greater Rochester International Airport)
  - Syracuse (Syracuse Hancock International Airport)
  - White Plains (Westchester County Airport)
- Ontario, Canada
  - Toronto (Toronto Pearson International Airport)
- Pennsylvania
  - Erie (Erie International Airport)
- Quebec, Canada
  - Montreal (Montréal-Pierre Elliott Trudeau International Airport)
- Rhode Island
  - Providence (T.F. Green Airport)
- Virginia
  - Washington, DC (suburbs) (Dulles International Airport)

== Fleet ==
- Beechcraft 1900
- Beech King Air 90
- Beechcraft Model 99
- Piper PA-31-350 Navajo Chieftain

== Incidents ==
- On April 26, 1983, Gene B. Katz from White Plains, New York, attempted to steal a Mall Airways plane from Albany County Airport. Katz kicked down a plexiglass door and entered the plane. Katz was later subdued by three sheriff's deputies.
- On September 9, 1984, two part-time employees of the airline, set fire to the offices of Mall Airways following their burglary. The two men stole about $4,000 from the airline and used the arson to cover up the burglary. The arson itself cause $1.6 million in damage.
- On February 26, 1979, a Mall Airways flight from Elmira to Albany with two passengers of board lost power during the flight. The pilots, who were Air Force veterans and members of the Air National Guard, worked with air traffic controllers on the ground and two other Mall Airways pilots in a Piper Navajo to land their Piper Aztec safely.

== See also ==
- List of defunct airlines of the United States
