= Business Express Airlines =

Regional airline of the United States (1982–2000)

| IATA | ICAO | Call sign |
|---|---|---|
| HQ | GAA | BIZEX |
- Founded: 1982 (as Atlantic Air)
- Commenced operations: 1985 (as Business Express Airlines)
- Ceased operations: December 1, 2000 (merged into American Eagle Airlines)
- Hubs: Boston; New York–JFK; New York–LaGuardia
- Fleet size: See Fleet below
- Destinations: See Destinations served below
- Parent company: AMR Eagle Holding Corp. after 1998
- Headquarters: Westport, Connecticut (1982–1995); Portsmouth, New Hampshire (1995–1998); Dover, New Hampshire (1998–2000)

Business Express Airlines, often referred to as Business Express or BizEX, was an American regional airline founded as Atlantic Air in 1982. In an effort to appeal to its predominantly business commuter clientele, the airline assumed the Business Express name in 1985. In 1986 Pilgrim Airlines (Groton/New London), which itself had acquired NewAir (New Haven) about a year prior, was acquired by the airline. This opened the valuable New York and Washington, D.C. markets. Shortly thereafter, Business Express became one of Delta Air Lines' first Delta Connection carriers, along with Atlantic Southeast Airlines (ASA), Comair and SkyWest Airlines. The company slogan was Fly BizEx Jets!.

Business Express's ICAO Three-Letter Designator was "GAA" and its IATA two-letter designator was "HQ". The radio call-sign was "BizEx".

At one point, it was headquartered in Westport, Connecticut. In 1995, BizEx was headquartered in Portsmouth, New Hampshire. Later in its life, BizEX was headquartered in Dover, New Hampshire. In 1998, the airline tried to relocate its headquarters and maintenance facility to the south side of Portland International Jetport. The airline ultimately did not move its headquarters and maintenance facility.

== History ==
Business Express expanded its existing route structure into Canada in 1989 through the acquisition of Mall Airways, a commuter airline based in Albany, New York, with routes to Toronto, Montreal, and Ottawa. In the mid-1990s, the airline negotiated an unconventional second codeshare agreement with Northwest Airlines, becoming the Northwest Airlink regional affiliate in New England and Eastern Canada. In September 1997, the branding scheme expanded to include a third partner, American Airlines, affiliated first as American Connection, and later as an integral carrier under the American Eagle program. These new affiliations were part of a broader expansion scheme that included longer-range flying beyond the Northeast, enhanced mainline flight bank integration and operation of jet aircraft.

== 'Fly BEX Jets!' ==
The jet age began, albeit hesitantly, at Business Express through the acquisition of Pilgrim Airlines in 1986; through this transaction, the growing airline acquired a single Fokker F28 Fellowship twin-jet aircraft but Business Express chose not to operate it due to concerns of profitability. In 1992, the airline obtained five British Aerospace BAe 146-200 69-passenger regional jets from Discovery Airways and placed an order for twenty new Avro RJ70s in the same year which then began to be added to the fleet in 1993. The Avro RJ70 was an improved version of the BAe 146. In the mid-1990s, Business Express became the first Delta Connection regional carrier to operate jet aircraft, predating deliveries of Canadair and Embraer Regional Jets to Atlantic Southeast Airlines, Comair, and SkyWest Airlines. Jet routes included international feeder service to Delta's transatlantic hub at JFK, with service to Cleveland Hopkins International Airport and Detroit Metropolitan Wayne County Airport.

Boston-based jet service included service along the Eastern Seaboard to Baltimore, Norfolk, and Richmond. Although long-coveted, Business Express was unable to operate the BAe 146 on the lucrative Boston Logan-Washington National sector due to landing slot restrictions on four-engine aircraft, and a primary reason these units did not succeed as significant revenue generators for the airline. In an effort to establish a larger regional identity, Business Express launched the 'Fly BEX Jets' program in 1994 on the Boston-Baltimore-Washington sector. The aggressive marketing scheme offered free round-trip flight vouchers for every round-trip flown on BAe-146 aircraft. The program was popular and heightened awareness, however, failed to generate significant revenue.

Using its radial approach to route development, Business Express launched service to Milwaukee's General Mitchell International Airport in 1994, competing directly with Midwest Express. The carrier operated two daily nonstop flights in the marketplace with 70-passenger Avro RJ70 aircraft, but generated lower-than-anticipated passenger traffic, and suspended the service in January 1995. Apart from its independent Northwest Airlink codeshare on Minneapolis-Aspen/Snowmass service, Milwaukee was the westernmost destination of the fully integrated BEX system. Its severely weather-affected market in the Northeast, Canada, and Upper Midwest made Southern routes both attractive and potentially feasible. Nevertheless, Business Express was unable to penetrate Southern vacation travel markets due to overlap with other Delta Connection carriers in Cincinnati and Atlanta. The airline lacked true 'feed' into one of Delta's largest mainline hubs. Constricted by a fierce operating culture in the Northeast and a lack of viable markets, Business Express was unable to identify a consistently profitable market for its jet aircraft. The airline never took full delivery of the Avro RJ70 order. BAe146-200s were replaced by five Avro RJ70s that operated primarily in the New York to Cleveland and Detroit markets, as well as between Boston and Baltimore, Norfolk, and Richmond.

With the jet program launch, a new and fully integrated interior overhaul was undertaken beginning in 1993. Aircraft seating featured a distinctive gray-on-gray horizontal stripe and red accented fabric. Eventually, all Saab 340 airframes were outfitted with standard upholstery featured in the BAe 146-200 jets. Although distinctive, the fabric program was replaced by all-leather seating beginning in 1997. Saab 340 aircraft were redeployed with blue leather seats featuring a slimmer profile and ergonomically advanced design. These aircraft joined the American Eagle fleet providing passenger feed for American Airlines with comparable interiors to its existing equipment.

== Hub expansion ==
Business Express embarked a significant route and fleet expansion beginning in 1993, although its facilities at hub airports Boston Logan International Airport, and New York City's LaGuardia and John F. Kennedy International airports were unable to effectively accommodate the influx in passenger boardings and aircraft movements. In May 1995, the carrier inaugurated a major expansion and renovation of its primary passenger hub at Boston Logan. Negotiated as a direct lease with Massport, these long-awaited facilities upgrades substantially increased gate and ramp space in the "C" concourse. Enhancements included improved Americans with Disabilities Act compliance, new airside elevators, upgraded signage, and refurbishment of all passenger lounge areas. Gatehouse expansion allowed the airline to reduce remote bus boardings, whereby 80 percent of the airline's daily departures were serviced directly from the terminal. Service was increased to both Bangor and Portland in Maine utilizing Avro RJ-70 jets and Saab 340 aircraft. Additional round-trip service was added between Boston Logan and Washington National Airport, bringing the total number of roundtrips to five daily, in addition to Delta's three mainline flights. At this time, Business Express was Boston's largest airline, operating 158 daily departures.

Operating as Northwest Jetlink, Business Express Airlines initiated service to Aspen/Snowmass from Minneapolis/St. Paul International Airport during the 1995-1996 ski season on behalf of Northwest Airlines via a code sharing agreement. The airline offered two daily nonstops utilizing 69-passenger Avro RJ70 jet aircraft. These flights required seasonal repositioning of dedicated equipment and were scheduled to coordinate with Northwest Airline's flight banks from their Minneapolis/St. Paul hub.

In November 1998, Business Express Airlines announced service between Presque Isle, Maine's Northern Maine Regional Airport from Boston Logan commencing with four daily round trip flights.

== Purchase by AMR ==
In December 1998, Business Express Airlines announced that AMR Eagle Holding Corp., a unit of AMR Corporation and parent of American Eagle Airlines and Executive Airlines would purchase the airline. Business Express had been operating as an American affiliate under the branding of American Connection at Boston Logan International Airport for only sixteen months prior to this announcement. All privately held Business Express stock was acquired by AMR Eagle Holding from several shareholders including the Philadelphia-based investment firm Dimeling, Schreiber & Park. Specific terms of the agreement were not disclosed.

The agreement was a lucrative move for American Airlines which like AMR Eagle Holdings was also a subsidiary of AMR Corporation, by offering the mainline carrier prime gate opportunities and landing slots at Boston Logan, New York LaGuardia, and Washington National airports, plus acquisition of an outstanding order of Embraer ERJ 135 jets. The airline held twenty firm orders and forty options for Embraer equipment with first deliveries scheduled in August 1999. By late 1999, Business Express began returning its forty-three Saab 340 aircraft, including (twenty-three A models, twenty B models) to their lessor. On December 1, 2000, the airline ceased independent existence when operations were transferred to American Eagle. One of the final flights was a run from the Boston Logan hub to the maintenance base in Bangor, Maine.

- Founded as Atlantic Air in 1982.
- Acquired Pilgrim Airlines in February 1986. The acquisition included Fokker F27 turboprop and Fokker F28 jet aircraft (Pilgrim Airlines had previously acquired New Haven Airways (dba NewAir).
- Acquired Mall Airways in September 1989.
- Acquired Beechcraft 1900 and Saab 340 turboprop feet of Brockway Air in December 1989.
- Acquired five BAe-146 jet aircraft in 1992 (former Discovery Airways aircraft). These distinctive four-engine jet aircraft operated in the following city pairs:

New York JFK-Cleveland, New York JFK-Detroit, Boston-Milwaukee, Boston-Norfolk, Boston-Richmond, Boston-Baltimore, Boston-Bangor, Boston-Portland, Boston-Nantucket (seasonal), Baltimore-Nantucket (seasonal)

== Destinations served ==
- Colorado
  - Aspen (Pitkin County Airport) - Northwest Jetlink service
- Connecticut
  - Bridgeport (Igor I. Sikorsky Memorial Airport)*
  - Groton/New London (Groton-New London Airport)*
  - Hartford (Bradley International Airport)
  - Hartford (Hartford-Brainard Airport)
  - New Haven (Tweed-New Haven Airport)
- Maine
  - Augusta (Augusta State Airport)
  - Bangor (Bangor International Airport)
  - Portland (Portland International Jetport)
  - Presque Isle (Northern Maine Regional Airport at Presque Isle)
- Maryland
  - Baltimore (Baltimore/Washington International Thurgood Marshall Airport)
- Massachusetts
  - Boston (Boston Logan International Airport)
  - Hyannis (Barnstable Municipal Airport)
  - Martha's Vineyard (Martha's Vineyard Airport)
  - Nantucket (Nantucket Memorial Airport)
- Michigan
  - Detroit (Detroit Metropolitan Wayne County Airport)
- Minnesota
  - Minneapolis/Saint Paul (Minneapolis–Saint Paul International Airport) - Northwest Jetlink service
- New Hampshire
  - Lebanon (Lebanon Municipal Airport)
  - Manchester (Manchester-Boston Regional Airport)
- New Jersey
  - Newark (Newark Liberty International Airport)
- New York
  - Albany (Albany International Airport)
  - Buffalo (Buffalo Niagara International Airport)
  - Islip (Long Island MacArthur Airport)
  - Newburgh (Stewart International Airport)
  - New York City
    - (John F. Kennedy International Airport)
    - (LaGuardia Airport)
  - Rochester (Greater Rochester International Airport)
  - Syracuse (Syracuse Hancock International Airport)
  - White Plains (Westchester County Airport)
- New Brunswick, Canada
  - Moncton (Moncton International Airport)
  - Saint John (Saint John Airport)
- Nova Scotia, Canada
  - Halifax (Halifax Stanfield International Airport)
- Ohio
  - Cleveland (Cleveland Hopkins International Airport)
- Ontario, Canada
  - Toronto (Toronto Pearson International Airport)
- Quebec, Canada
  - Montreal (Montréal–Trudeau International Airport)
  - Montreal (Montréal–Mirabel International Airport)*
  - Quebec City (Québec City Jean Lesage International Airport)
- Pennsylvania
  - Philadelphia, Pennsylvania (Philadelphia International Airport)
- Rhode Island
  - Providence (Rhode Island T. F. Green International Airport)
- Vermont
  - Burlington (Burlington International Airport)
- Virginia
  - Richmond, Virginia (Richmond International Airport)
  - Norfolk, Virginia (Norfolk International Airport)
  - Washington, D.C. (suburbs)
    - (Washington Dulles International Airport)
    - (Ronald Reagan Washington National Airport)
- Wisconsin
  - Milwaukee (Milwaukee Mitchell International Airport)

Those airports marked with a (*) no longer have scheduled airline service.

== Fleet ==
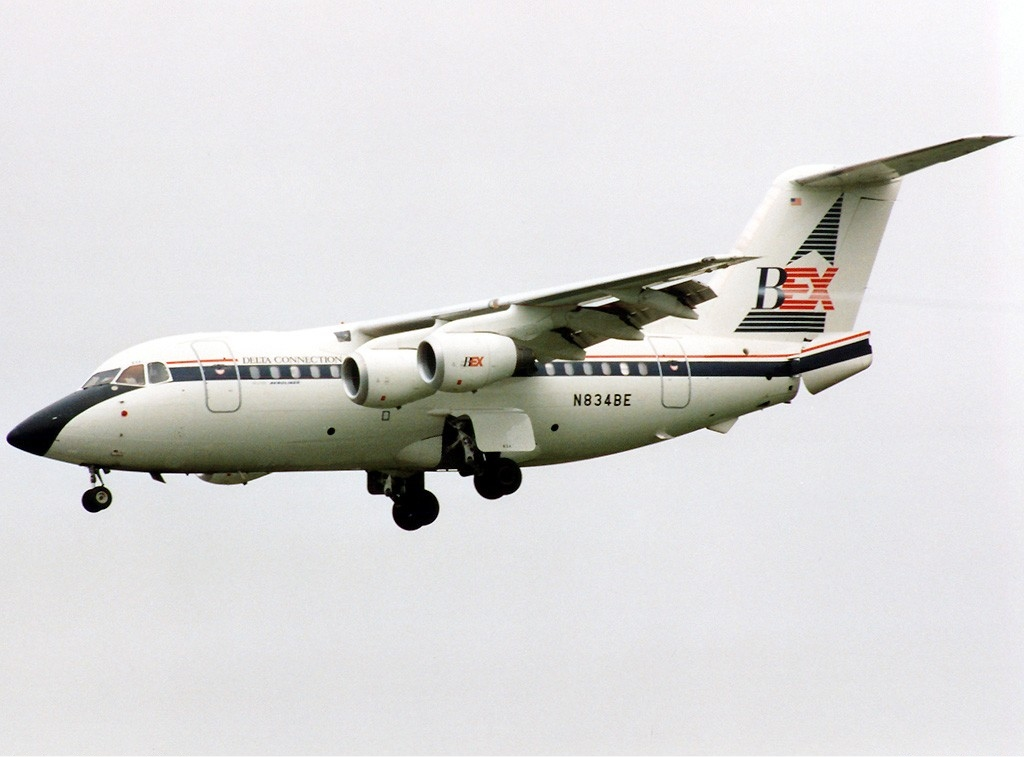
A Business Express Airlines Avro RJ70

- Piper PA-31 Navajo - Original Business Express fleet when the company was founded from Atlantic Air
- Beechcraft Model 99 - Retired in 1986 shortly after Beech 1900 deliveries began.
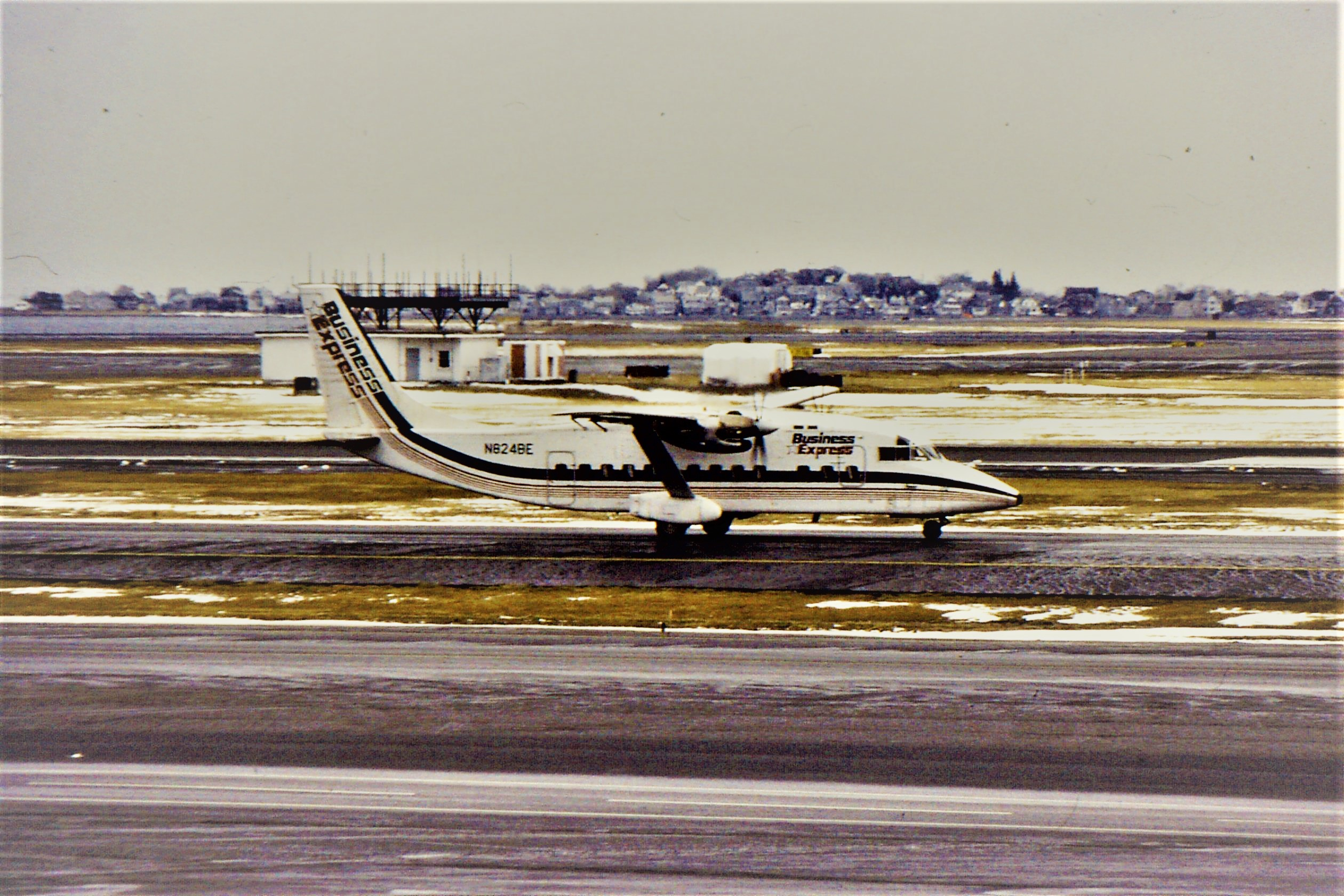
- A Business Express Shorts 360
  Beechcraft 1900 - Two acquired in buy-out of Mall Airways in September 1989. (N15394 AND N15503) Numerous others operated, some acquired new, some used through the purchase of former Brockway aircraft
- Short 360 - 4x 360-200 and 8x 360-300
- Saab 340 - Some acquired from Brockway Air
- Fokker F27 - Acquired with the purchase of Pilgrim Airlines.
- Fokker F28 - Acquired with the purchase of Pilgrim Airlines, but never operated.
- de Havilland Canada DHC-6 Twin Otter - Acquired with purchase of Pilgrim Airlines, but never operated.
- BAe 146-200 - Five aircraft from Discovery Air. Operated while awaiting delivery of RJ70 fleet.
- Avro RJ70 - Replaced the BAe 146-200 fleet.

== Accidents and incidents ==
- February 10, 1970: N124PM, a Turbo Prop De Havilland DHC-6, Twin Otter, went down in the Long Island Sound near Waterford, Connecticut, about two hours after it had departed from Trumbull Airport en route to JFK Airport. After Pilgrim Airlines Flight 203 was held in the New York area for an extended period, it diverted to Tweed New Haven Airport, where it attempted and missed an instrument landing approach. The aircraft was ditched in the Sound when it attempted to return to Trumbull Airport. All 5 people aboard the aircraft perished. The NTSB determined that the probable cause of the accident was fuel exhaustion and pilot error.
- February 21, 1982 → Pilgrim Airlines Flight 458
- January 13, 1984: Pilgrim Airlines Flight 35, N148PM a Fokker F27. While raising the gear after a runway 04L takeoff, from JFK, the no. 1 prop autofeathered. Power was reduced on the no. 1 engine but then the no. 2 engine experienced a power loss. The gear was extended again, but the aircraft contacted the runway before the gear extended fully. The aircraft skidded 1200 feet before coming to rest near the intersection of taxiway G and runway 04L, 104 feet right of the side of the runway.
- December 28, 1991: N811BE a Beechcraft 1900 was lost near Block Island, RI during a nighttime training flight. The training officer (John E. Murphy) and two captain trainees (Michael "Mickey" Kane and Michael Lurie) were killed. While the NTSB Probable cause affixes the cause to errors on the part of the training officer, subsequent investigation by the Airline Pilots Association (ALPA) opened the possibility of catastrophic airframe failure. ALPA petitioned the NTSB to reopen the investigation in 1997, but to this date, the Safety Board has failed to take action.
- July 17, 1996: N832BE an AVRO 146-RJ70A touched down 2500 feet past the threshold and went off the end of the 7000-foot runway, coming to a halt 300 feet beyond. No injuries or fatalities.

== See also ==
- Cape Air
- JetBlue
- List of defunct airlines of the United States
