= Visual Glide Slope Indicator =

Aircraft landing ground device

Visual Glide Slope Indicator or Visual Glideslope Indicator (VGSI) is a ground device that uses lights to assist a pilot in landing an airplane at an airport. The lights define a vertical approach path during the final approach to a runway and can help the pilot determine if the airplane is too high or too low for an optimum landing.

There are several different types of VGSIs:

Visual Approach Slope Indicator (VASI)
Precision Approach Path Indicator (PAPI)
Pulsating Visual Approach Slope Indicator (PVASI)
Three-color Visual Approach Slope Indicator (T-VASI)
Helicopter Approach Path Indicator (HAPI)
Alignment of Element Systems

Alignment of elements systems are installed on some small general aviation airports and are a low-cost system consisting of painted plywood panels, normally black and white or fluorescent orange. Some of these systems are lighted for night use. The useful range of these systems is approximately three-quarter miles. To use the system, the pilot positions the aircraft so the elements are in alignment.

In the United States, the Federal Aviation Administration includes VGSI information in its Chart Supplement (formerly the Airport/Facility Directory) publication. The VGSI, if installed, is listed immediately after each runway and is coded to indicate the type and specific implementation. For example, Chicago Executive Airport (KPWK) located in Wheeling, IL has runway 16. In the A/FD, after runway 16 is listed "PAPI(P4L)" which is a PAPI of four (4) identical light units placed on the left side of the runway. The various VGSI codes and their descriptions can be found in the "VISUAL GLIDESLOPE INDICATORS" section of the Directory Legend in the Chart Supplement.
