= AB Airlines =

Airline of the United Kingdom

IATA	ICAO	Call sign
7L	AZX	AZTEC
- Founded: 1993
- Commenced operations: October 1993
- Ceased operations: November 1999
- Headquarters: Stansted Airport, Uttlesford, Essex
- Website: abairlines.com

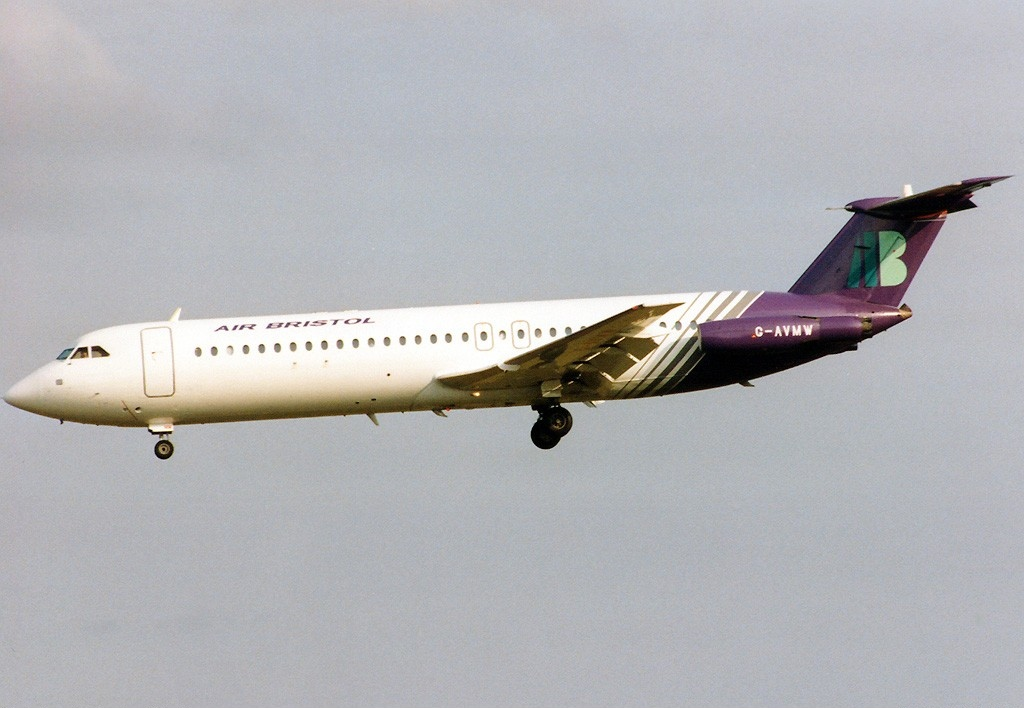
An Air Bristol BAC One-Eleven at Stansted Airport in 1994

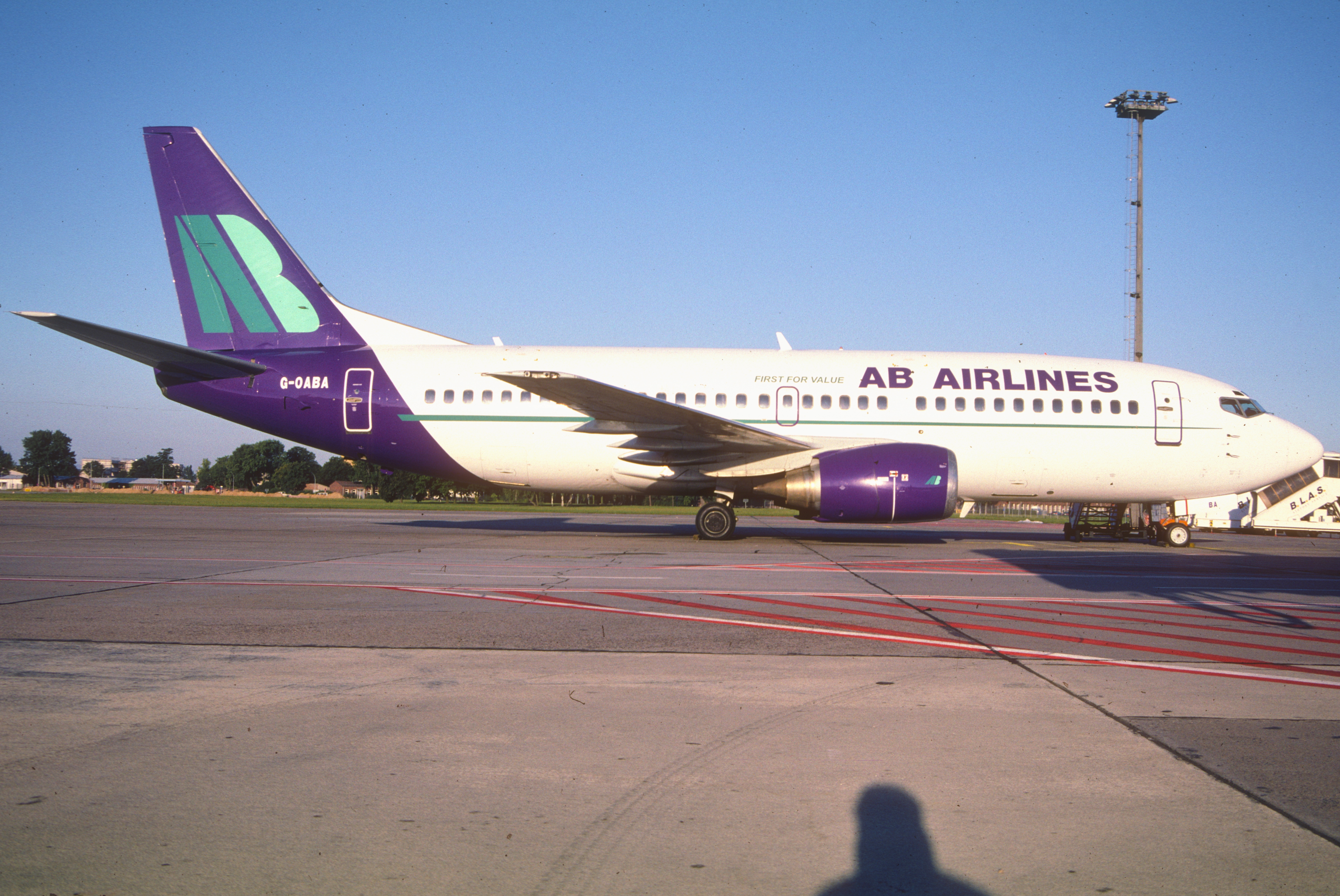
An AB Airlines Boeing 737-300 at Berlin Schönefeld Airport in 1998

AB Airlines was an airline with its head office in the Enterprise House, Stansted Airport in Uttlesford, Essex. AB was one of the first low-cost airlines in England, preceding others such as EasyJet, Ryanair and Go Fly. It was established on 8 February 1993 by former Brymon Airways executives and was formerly known as Air Bristol. Irregular flight operations started on 11 October and were followed by full schedules on 7 December. In 1995 and 1996 the airline marketed itself as Air Belfast, reflecting its then principal route between Belfast International Airport and London Stansted. Aircraft and crew were based at Belfast International Airport, Stansted Airport and Bristol Filton Airport. A base was opened in 1994 at Shannon Airport to operate flights to London Gatwick. From 1993 operation was marketed as AB Shannon.

When a base was set up at London Gatwick the name was changed to AB Airlines in 1997 as its network covered more destinations than just Shannon. It mainly flew scheduled services from London Gatwick to Shannon, Lisbon and Berlin Schönefeld, and also from London Stansted and Birmingham to Shannon. It also offered charter flights to holiday destinations in Europe.

After heavy financial losses, a large number of dropped schedules, and major restructuring within the company, AB Airlines went into administration in August 1999 and halted operations on 10 September. Its last remaining scheduled services from London Gatwick to Nice in France and Shannon in Ireland were taken over by British Airways.

AB Airlines chairman Brian Beal later went on to start another low-cost airline, Fly Europa.

== Fleet ==
AB Airlines fleet consisted of Boeing 737-300s, a single Boeing 737-400 and BAC One-Elevens. In May 1998 Boeing announced that AB Airlines had placed orders for six Boeing 737-700 aircraft, making it the first airline in Europe to do so. However, with the financial problems of the company followed by insolvency the following year, AB Airlines went into administration and its remaining services were taken over by British Airways.

AB Airlines historical fleet
Aircraft type	Operated	From / To
BAC One-Eleven 500 series	6	1993-1999
Boeing 737-300	3	1998-1999
Boeing 737-400	2	1998-1998

== See also ==
- List of defunct airlines of the United Kingdom
