= History of Tibetan Buddhism =

Buddhists, predominantly from India, first actively disseminated their practices in Tibet from the 6th to the 9th centuries CE. During the Era of Fragmentation (9th–10th centuries), Buddhism waned in Tibet, only to rise again in the 11th century. With the Mongol invasion of Tibet (1240 onwards) and the establishment of the Mongol Yuan dynasty (1271–1368) in China, Tibetan Buddhism spread beyond Tibet to Mongolia and China. From the 14th to the 20th centuries, Tibetan Buddhism was patronized by the Chinese Ming dynasty (1368–1644) and the Manchurian Qing dynasty (1644–1912) which ruled China.

The Gelugpa school, founded by Je Tsongkhapa (1357–1419), rose to (political) prominence under Ngawang Lobsang Gyatso (1617–1682), the 5th Dalai Lama (in office 1642–1682), who invited the Mongols to intervene in the Tibetan civil war of 1639–1642. The Mongols invested him with the political power of Tibet, leading to the dominance of the Gelugpa until the 20th century. In the 19th century the Rimé movement provided a counter-weight against this dominance, trying to preserve the teachings of the Nyingma, Kagyu and Sakya schools.

In the early 20th century Tibet acquired de facto independence from the Manchurian Qing Empire. Tibetan independence ended with the Chinese invasion of 1950, which resulted in an exodus of Tibetans. In the 21st century, Tibetan Buddhism continues to have adherents on the Tibetan Plateau and in surrounding regions, while it has also attracted a considerable interest in the Western world.

== Pre 6th century ==
Centuries after Buddhism originated in India, the Mahayana Buddhism arrived in China through the Silk Route in 1st century CE via Tibet. During the 3rd century, Buddhism began to spread into the Tibetan region, and its teachings began to affect the Bon religion in the Kingdom of Zhangzhung.

== Buddhist origins ==
According to verbal history, during the reign of King Thothori Nyantsen in the 6th century, (Note: On this date, see Richardson, Hugh: "The Origin of the Tibetan Kingdom", in: The History of Tibet, ed. Alex McKay, Vol. 1, London 2003, p. 159. Traditional Tibetan sources state that this event occurred rather in 233.) buddhist relics including a golden stupa, a tsa tsa mold, and Buddhist Sutras first arrived in Tibet, falling from the sky onto the palace roof of Yumbulakhang where the king was walking. (Note: According to a Tibetan legendary tradition, they fell from the sky and included Kāraṇḍavyūhasūtra: Studholme, Alexander: The Origins of Om Manipadme Hum, Albany, NY 2002, pp. 13–14.)

== Songtsen Gampo (7th century) ==
Sanskrit Buddhist scriptures from Nepal & India were first translated into Tibetan under the reign of the Tibetan king Songtsen Gampo (618–649), who established the Tibetan Empire. Songtsen Gampo is traditionally credited with the introduction of Buddhism to Tibet, influenced by his Nepali consort Bhrikuti, of Nepal's Licchavi dynasty, as well as with the unification of what had previously been several Tibetan kingdoms. It is known that he married a Chinese Tang dynasty Buddhist princess, Wencheng, who came to Tibet with a statue of Shakyamuni Buddha. It is clear from Tibetan sources that some of his successors became ardent Buddhists. The records show that Chinese Buddhists were actively involved in missionary activity in Tibet, but they did not have the same level of imperial support as Indian Buddhists, with tantric lineages from Bihar and Bengal.

By the second half of the 8th century he was already regarded as an embodiment of the Bodhisattva Avalokiteśvara.

According to Tibetan traditions, Queen Bhrikuti was a devout Licchavi kingdom Buddhist and brought many sacred images and expert Newari craftsmen with her as part of her dowry. The Red Palace (Mar-po-ri Pho-drang) on Marpo Ri (Red Mountain) in Lhasa, which was later rebuilt into the thirteen storey Potala by the Fifth Dalai Lama, was constructed by Nepali craftsmen. The famous Nepali artist Thro-wo carved the revered statue of Chenresig, Thungji Chen-po rang-jung nga-ldan. A statue of Akshobya Buddha from India, named the Mikyo Jowo or Jowo Chungpa was housed in the Jokhang Temple in Lhasa.

Songtsen Gampo and Bhrikuti built a great temple, the Tsulag Khang (or 'House of Wisdom') to house the images, which is now known as the Jokhang ('House of the Lord') in the heart of Lhasa, and is considered to be the most sacred temple in Tibet.

Bhrikuti is usually represented as Green Tara in Tibetan iconography. Bhrikuti and Wencheng are said to have worked together to establish temples and Buddhism in Tibet.

== Trisong Detsen (8th century) ==
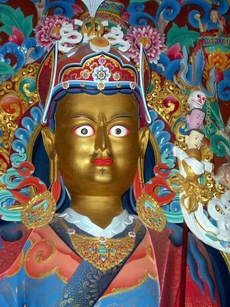
Padmasambhāva, founder of the Nyingmapa, the earliest school of Tibetan Buddhism

In the 8th century Buddhism really took hold in Tibet. (Note: For more detail, see: Alexander Berzin, History of the Early Period of Buddhism and Bon in Tibet) The successors of Songtsän Gampo were less enthusiastic about the propagation of Buddhism, but in the 8th century King Trisong Detsen (755–797) established it as the official religion of the state.

Trisong Detsen invited Indian Buddhist scholars to his court, and Tibetan Buddhists today trace their oldest spiritual roots to the Indian masters Padmasambhāva (8th century) and Śāntarakṣita (725–788), who founded the Nyingma school, The Ancient Ones, the oldest school of Tibetan Buddhism. According to Tibetan tradition, Padmasambhāva wrote a number of important scriptures, some of which he hid for future tertons to find; these Terma "treasures" (revealed texts) are of particular significance to the Nyingma school.

At this early time also, from the south came the influence of scholars under the Pāla dynasty in the Indian state of Magadha. They had achieved a blend of Mahāyāna and Vajrayāna that has come to characterize all forms of Tibetan Buddhism. Their teaching in sutra centered on the Abhisamayālankāra, a 4th-century Yogācārin text, but prominent among them were the Mādhyamika scholars Śāntarakṣita and Kamalaśīla.

A third influence was that of the Sarvāstivādins from Kashmir to the southwest and Khotan to the northwest. Although they did not succeed in maintaining a presence in Tibet, their texts found their way into the Tibetan Buddhist canon, providing the Tibetans with almost all of their primary sources about what they regarded to be the Hinayana. A subsect of this school, Mūlasarvāstivāda was the source of the Tibetan vinaya.

=== Chinese influences (8th century) ===
The Chinese princess Jincheng Gongzhu (zh:金城公主) (?–739), known in Tibet as Kim-sheng, (Note: From Gyim shang Ong; also known as Kong-co) and a devout Buddhist, was sent to Tibet in 710 where she married Mes-ag-tshoms. (Note: He who would have been only six or seven years old at the time.) Buddhist monks from Khotan (Li), fleeing the persecutions of an anti-Buddhist king, were given refuge by Kim-sheng about 737. Kim-sheng died during an outbreak of smallpox sometime between 739 and 741, and anti-Buddhist factions in Tibet began to blame the epidemic on the support of Buddhism by the king and queen. This forced the monks to flee once again; first to Gandhara, and then to Kosambi in central India where the monks apparently ended up quarrelling and slaughtering each other.

Tibetan king Trisong Detsen (742–797) invited the Chan master Moheyan (Note: 和尚摩訶衍; his name consists of the same Chinese characters used to transliterate "Mahayana") (Tibetan: Hwa shang Mahayana)) to transmit the Dharma at Samye Monastery. According to Tibetan sources, Moheyan lost the so-called council of Lhasa (793), a debate sponsored by Trisong Detsen on the nature of emptiness with the Indian master Kamalaśīla, and the king declared Kamalaśīlas philosophy should form the basis for Tibetan Buddhism. (Note: The whole incident was recorded in a book called "Le Concile de Lhasa" by French historian Paul Demieville.) (Note: Kamalaśīla wrote the three Bhāvanākrama texts (修習次第三篇) after that.) However, a Chinese source found in Dunhuang written by Mo-ho-yen says their side won, and some scholars conclude that the entire episode is fictitious.

Pioneering Buddhologist Giuseppe Tucci speculated that Mohayen's ideas were preserved by the Nyingmapas in the form of dzogchen teachings. (Note: According to A. W. Barber of the University of Calgary, Chan Buddhism was introduced to the Nyingmapa in three principal streams: the teachings of Korean Master Kim, Kim Ho-shang, (Chin ho shang) 金和尚 transmitted by Sang Shi in c. 750 AD; the lineage of Master Wu Chu (無住禪師) of the Pao T'ang School was transmitted within Tibet by Ye-shes Wangpo; and the teaching from Mo-ho-yen, that were a synthesis of the Northern School of Chan and the Pao T'ang School.) John Myrdhin Reynolds and Sam van Schaik reject this possibility. According to Reynolds, "Except for a brief flirtation with Ch'an in the early days of Buddhism in Tibet in the eighth century, the Tibetans exhibited almost no interest at all in Chinese Buddhism, except for translating a few Sutras from Chinese for which they did not possess Indian originals." (Note: Schaik emphasises that Chan and Dzogchen are based on two different classes of scripture, Chan being based on sutras, while Dzogchen being based on tantras. Schaik further states "apparent similarities can be misleading.")

==== Growth in Tibet (9th century) ====
From the outset Buddhism was opposed by the native shamanistic Bön religion, which had the support of the aristocracy, but it thrived under royal patronage, reaching a peak under King Rälpachän (r. 817–836). Terminology in translation was standardised around 825, enabling a highly literal translation methodology.

== Ralpachen (9th century) ==
Ralpachen is considered a very important king in the history of Tibet and of Tibetan Buddhism. He was the third of the three Dharma Kings (chos gyal) of the Yarlung Dynasty, following Songtsen Gampo the 33rd king, nd Trisong Detsen the 38th king. Least renown of the three, Ralpachen's contributions to Tibetan Buddhism were profound.

All three kings respectively contributed in bringing Mahayana Buddhism to Tibet and evolving the yana into the Vajrayana, through their imperial sponsoring and patronizing of the Vajrayana by way of Guru Padmasambhava.[4] In supporting the growth of Tibetan Buddhism, they built monasteries with Khenpo Santaraksita, grew ordained sanghas of monks and nuns, compiled and printed the Tibetan canon and printed dharma books at Sanchu and spread the Buddhadharma through imperial patronage into their empire.

The Tibetan Empire during the reign of Ralpachen grew to its largest extent,[6] and the successful military battles against the Tang China Empire led to the 821-823 Tibet-China treaty.[7] Three stone stelae (pillars) are inscribed with the treaty terms, and one of each was built in Lhasa at the Jokhang Monastery, in Chang'an, and at the agreed border.[3]

The death of Ralpachen in 838, after being murdered by his brother Ü Dumtsen, ended the imperial patronage of Tibetan Buddhism, which had begun about eighty years earlier around 755 with Padmasambhava, Shantirakshita and Trisong Detsen, following the preliminary patronage of Songsten Gampo in the 7th century.

Afterwards, Langdarma was not to take the throne until 841, when he proceeded to nearly destroy Buddhism in Tibet, together with the 13 Buddhist monasteries, and their ordained monastics, which were built during the reign of Trisong Detsen and Ralpachen.

== Era of fragmentation (mid-9th–10th centuries) ==
A reversal in imperial patronage of Tibetan Buddhism began under King Ü Dumtsen (Langdarma, r. 841–842), who persecuted ordained monks and nuns and destroyed their monasteries. After his own assassination, his two sons were unable to stabilize the Tibetan Empire. The Era of Fragmentation of the Tibetan Empire followed.

During this time, the political centralization of the Tibetan Empire collapsed. The period was dominated by rebellions against the remnants of imperial Tibet and the rise of regional kings and queens. The pre-empire system of semi-autonomous political entities was renewed.

In the 11th century, a period of a strong Kagyu leadership in central Tibet was followed by a Sakya period, when the Sakya school became preceptors of the Yuan imperial court. Ösung's allies managed to keep control of Lhasa, and Yumtän was forced to go to Yalung, where he established a separate line of kings.

== Tibetan Renaissance (10th–12th centuries) ==
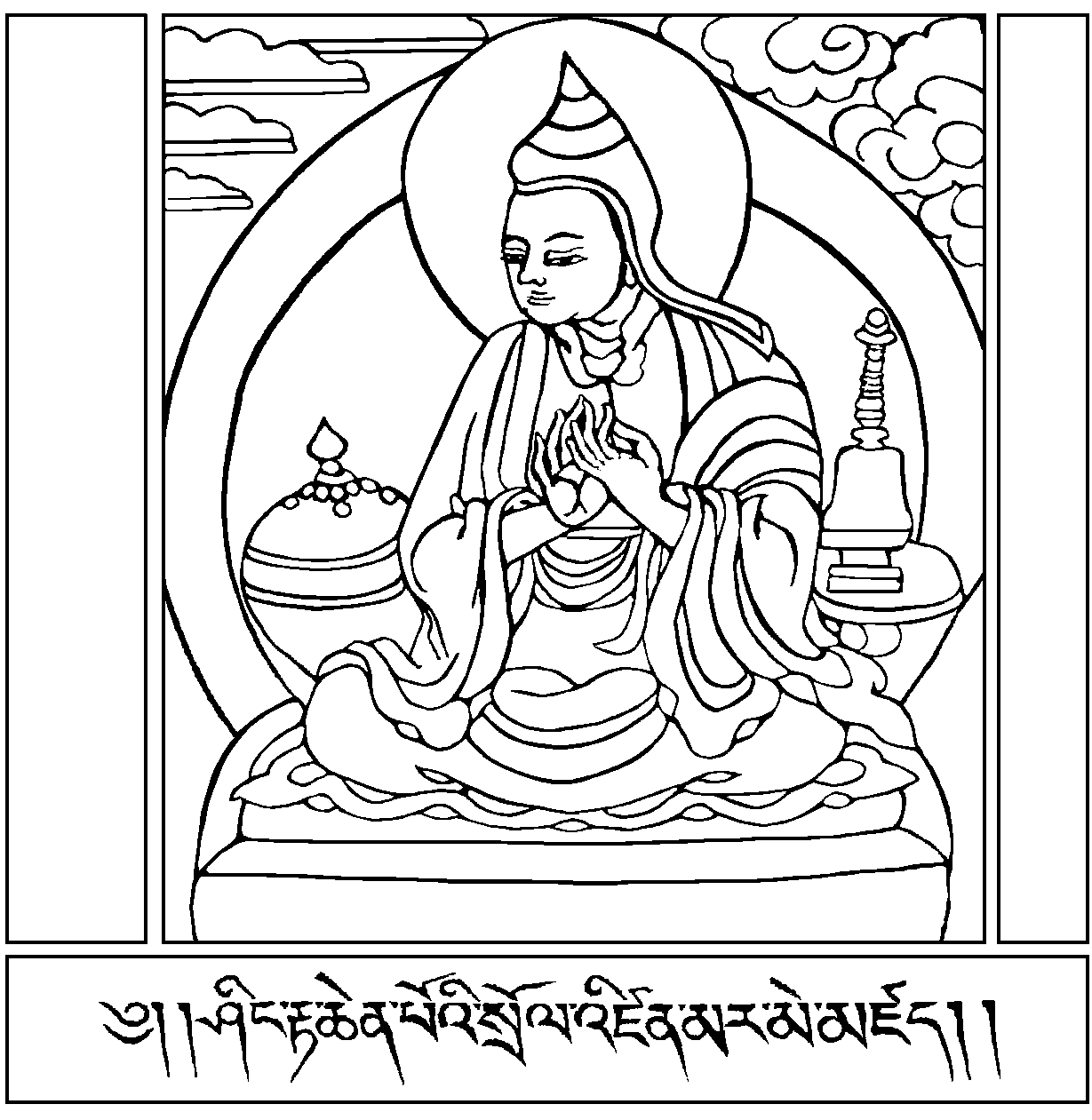
Atiśa

The late 10th and 11th century saw a revival of Buddhism in Tibet. Coinciding with the early discoveries of "hidden treasures" (terma), the 11th century saw a revival of Buddhist influence originating in the far east and far west of Tibet. In the west, Rinchen Zangpo (958–1055) was active as a translator and founded temples and monasteries. Prominent scholars and teachers were again invited from India.

In 1042 Atiśa (982–1054 CE) arrived in Tibet at the invitation of a west Tibetan king. This renowned exponent of the Pāla form of Buddhism from the Indian university of Vikramashila later moved to central Tibet. There his chief disciple, Dromtonpa founded the Kadampa school of Tibetan Buddhism, under whose influence the New Translation schools of today evolved.

The Sakya, the Grey Earth school, was founded by Khön Könchok Gyelpo (Wylie: 'khon dkon mchog rgyal po, 1034–1102), a disciple of the great Lotsawa, Drogmi Shākya (Wylie: brog mi lo tsā wa ye shes). It is headed by the Sakya Trizin, traces its lineage to the mahasiddha Virūpa, and represents the scholarly tradition. A renowned exponent, Sakya Pandita (1182–1251CE), was the great-grandson of Khön Könchok Gyelpo.

Other seminal Indian teachers were Tilopa (988–1069) and his student Naropa (probably died c. 1040 CE).The Kagyu, the Lineage of the (Buddha's) Word, is an oral tradition which is very much concerned with the experiential dimension of meditation. Its most famous exponent was Milarepa, an 11th-century mystic. It contains one major and one minor subsect. The first, the Dagpo Kagyu, encompasses those Kagyu schools that trace back to the Indian master Naropa via Marpa Lotsawa, Milarepa and Gampopa

== Mongol dominance (13th–14th centuries) ==
=== Initial influence on Mongolia (11th–13th centuries) ===
Tibetan Buddhism exerted a strong influence from the 11th century CE among the peoples of Inner Asia, especially the Mongols. Tantric-style Tibetan Buddhism was possibly first spread to the Mongols via the Tangut state of Western Xia (1038–1227). Buddhists entered the service of the Mongol Empire in the early 13th century. Buddhist monasteries established in Karakorum were granted tax exempt status, though the religion was not given official status by the Mongols until later.

=== Mongol conquest of Tibet (13th century) ===
The Mongols invaded Tibet in 1240. The Mongols withdrew their soldiers from Tibet in 1241, and returned to the region in 1244, when Köten delivered an ultimatum, summoning the abbot of Sakya (Kun-dga' rGyal-mtshan) to be his personal chaplain, on pains of a larger invasion were he to refuse. Sakya Paṇḍita took almost 3 years to obey the summons and arrive in the Kokonor region in 1246, and met Prince Köten in Liangzhou the following year. The Mongols had annexed Amdo and Kham to the east, and appointed Sakya Paṇḍita Viceroy of Central Tibet by the Mongol court in 1249.

Tibet was incorporated into the Mongol Empire, retaining nominal power over religious and regional political affairs, while the Mongols managed a structural and administrative rule over the region, reinforced by the rare military intervention.

=== Yuan dynasty (1271–1368) ===
Tibetan Buddhism was adopted as the de facto state religion by the Mongol Yuan dynasty (1271–1368), founded by Kublai Khan, that also ruled China. (Note: The Mongols may have been attracted to the Lamaist tradition and responded the way they did due to the Lamaist's superficial culture similarities with the Mongol's Shamanist culture. Even with this attraction, however, the Mongols "paid little attention to the fine points of Buddhist doctrine.")

All variants of Buddhism, such as Chinese, Tibetan and Indian Buddhism flourished, though Tibetan Buddhism was eventually favored at the imperial level under emperor Möngke (1209–1259), who appointed Namo from Kashmir as chief of all Buddhist monks. The top-level department and government agency known as the Bureau of Buddhist and Tibetan Affairs (Xuanzheng Yuan) was set up in Khanbaliq (modern-day Beijing) to supervise Buddhist monks throughout the empire. The Sakya Imperial Preceptors were active at the Yuan court and enjoyed special power. During this period Tibetan Buddhism was practiced not only within the capital Beijing and the Tibetan Plateau, but throughout the country. For instance, Hangzhou, capital of the former Southern Song dynasty and the largest city in the Yuan realm, became an important hub of the activities of Tibetan Buddhism, which took public or official precedence over Han Chinese Buddhism. Similarly, Mount Wutai, the sacred site of Bodhisattva Manjusri and the holy mountain of Chinese Buddhist pilgrims, was greatly influenced by Tibetan Buddhism.

=== Decline of the Golden Horde and the Ilkhanate (13th–14th centuries) ===
Among the ruling class of the Mongol khanates of the Golden Horde (1240s–1502) and the Ilkhanate (1256–1335/1353), the two western khanates of the Mongol Empire, Shamanism and Buddhism were once the dominant religions, as in the Yuan dynasty. In the early days, the rulers of both khanates increasingly adopted Tibetan Buddhism, like the Yuan dynasty at that time. However, the Mongol rulers Ghazan of the Ilkhanate and Uzbeg of the Golden Horde converted to Islam in AD 1295 and AD 1313 respectively. The Yuan dynasty based in China and Mongolia became the only division of the Mongol Empire not to embrace Islam, instead favoring Tibetan Buddhism until its demise.

== Tibetan independence (14th–18th centuries) ==
With the decline of the Yuan dynasty, Central Tibet was ruled by successive families from the 14th to the 17th century, and Tibet would be de facto independent from the mid-14th century on, for nearly 400 years.

=== Family rule and establishment of Gelugpa school (14th–17th centuries) ===
Jangchub Gyaltsän (Byang chub rgyal mtshan, 1302–1364) became the strongest political family in the mid-14th century. Military hostilities ended in 1354 with Jangchub Gyaltsän as the unquestioned victor, who established the Phagmodrupa dynasty in that year. He continued to rule central Tibet until his death in 1364, although he left all Mongol institutions in place as hollow formalities. Power remained in the hands of the Phagmodru family until 1434.

The rule of Jangchub Gyaltsän and his successors implied a new cultural self-awareness where models were sought in the age of the ancient Tibetan Kingdom. The relatively peaceful conditions favoured the literary and artistic development. During this period the reformist scholar Je Tsongkhapa (1357–1419) founded the Gelug sect which would have a decisive influence on Tibet's history.

Internal strife within the Phagmodrupa dynasty, and the strong localism of the various fiefs and political-religious factions, led to a long series of internal conflicts. The minister family Rinpungpa, based in Tsang (West Central Tibet), dominated politics after 1435.

In 1565 the Rinpungpa family was overthrown by the Tsangpa dynasty of Shigatse which expanded its power in different directions of Tibet in the following decades and favoured the Karma Kagyu sect. They would play a pivotal role in the events which led to the rise of power of the Dalai Lama's in the 1640s.

=== Foreign patronage ===
==== China ====
Tibetan Buddhism was patronized by the ethnic Chinese in Ming China after overthrowing Mongol rule, and kept friendly relations with some of the Buddhism religious leaders known as Princes of Dharma and granted some other titles to local leaders including the Grand Imperial Tutor.

==== Mongolia ====
During the early period of the Northern Yuan dynasty (1368 - c. 1636), shamanism once again became the sole dominant religion in Mongolia, but the last sixty years before the death of the last khan Ligdan Khan (1588–1643) were marked by intensive penetration of Tibetan Buddhism into Mongolian society. In 1578, Sonam Gyatso was invited to Mongolia and converted Altan Khan to Buddhism along with his tribe (the first Mongol tribe to be so converted). Altan Khan conferred the title "Dalai" on him, "Dalai" being the Mongolian translation of his Tibetan name "Gyatso", which means "sea" or "ocean". This is the origin of the title Dalai Lama. The Ming assisted Altan Khan (1507–1582), King of the Tümed Mongols, when he requested aid in propagating Vajrayana Buddhism. Within 50 years nearly all the Mongols had become Buddhists, including tens of thousands of monks, almost all followers of the Gelug school and loyal to the Dalai Lama. Since then Tibetan Buddhism has played a very important role among the Mongols.

Tibetan Buddhism was the most important religion among the Mongols under Qing rule (1635–1912), as well as the state religion of the Kalmyk Khanate (1630–1771), the Dzungar Khanate (1634–1758) and the Khoshut Khanate (1642–1717). Tibetan Buddhism was also adored by the Manchu Qing court (1644–1912) since both Mongols and Tibetans believed in Tibetan Buddhism. Some historians may view the promotion of Tibetan Buddhism among the Mongols by the Chinese and Manchus as a deliberate plot to weaken the Mongol's military power, but others reject the theory.

=== Ganden Phodrang government (17th–18th centuries) ===
The Ganden Phodrang was the Tibetan regime or government that was established by the 5th Dalai Lama with the help of the Güshi Khan of the Khoshut in 1642. After the civil war in the 17th century and the Mongol intervention, the Gelugpa school dominated Tibetan Buddhism, and successive Dalai Lamas ruled Tibet from the mid-17th to mid-20th centuries.

==== Beginnings of the Dalai Lama lineage ====
The rise of the Dalai Lama's was intimately connected with the military power of Mongolian clans. Altan Khan, the king of the Tümed Mongols, first invited Sonam Gyatso, the head of the Gelugpa school of Tibetan Buddhism (later known as the third Dalai Lama), to Mongolia in 1569 and again in 1578, during the reign of the Tsangpa family. Gyatso accepted the second invitation. They met at the site of Altan Khan's new capital, Koko Khotan (Hohhot), and the Dalai Lama taught a huge crowd there.

Sonam Gyatso publicly announced that he was a reincarnation of the Tibetan Sakya monk Drogön Chögyal Phagpa (1235–1280) who converted Kublai Khan, while Altan Khan was a reincarnation of Kublai Khan (1215–1294), the famous ruler of the Mongols and Emperor of China, and that they had come together again to cooperate in propagating the Buddhist religion. While this did not immediately lead to a massive conversion of Mongols to Buddhism (this would only happen in the 1630s), it did lead to the widespread use of Buddhist ideology for the legitimation of power among the Mongol nobility. Last but not least, Yonten Gyatso, the fourth Dalai Lama, was a grandson of Altan Khan.

==== Rise and dominance of Gelugpa (17th–18th centuries) ====
Sonam Choephel (1595–1657 CE), the first regent of the fifth Dalai Lama, was "the prime architect of the Gelug's rise to power". Sonam Choephel requested the aid of Güshi Khan, a powerful Dzungar military leader to end decades of clan-wars in Dbus and Gtsang provinces, and the Tibetan civil war of 1639–1642. Güshi Khan (who was head of the Khoshut tribe) conquered Kham in 1640 bringing the Sakyas and the lords of Kham and Amdo under their control. His victory over Karma Tenkyong, the prince of Tsang in Shigatse, in 1642, completed the military unification of the country and the establishment of the Khoshut Khanate. By this feat the Phagmodrupa dynasty, which was associated with a variant of the Kagyu school, was technically replaced; in fact it had been powerless for many years. By subsequently formally recognizing the Fifth Dalai Lama's authority in 1642, Güshi Khan effectively made Gyatso the temporal ruler of all Tibet.

== Qing rule (18th–20th centuries) ==
=== Establishment of Qing rule ===
The Qing dynasty (1644–1912) established their rule over Tibet after a Qing expedition force defeated the Dzungars in 1720, and lasted until the fall of the Qing dynasty in 1912. The Qing emperors appointed imperial residents known as the Ambans to Tibet, who commanded over 2,000 troops stationed in Lhasa and reported to the Lifan Yuan, a Qing government agency that oversaw the region during this period. The rulers of the Manchu Qing dynasty supported Tibetan Buddhism, especially the Gelug sect, for most of their dynasty.

=== Rimé movement (19th century) ===
The Rimé movement was a movement involving the Sakya, Kagyu and Nyingma schools of Tibetan Buddhism, along with some Bon scholars. Having seen how the Gelug institutions pushed the other traditions into the corners of Tibet's cultural life, Jamyang Khyentse Wangpo (1820–1892) and Jamgön Kongtrül (1813–1899) compiled together the teachings of the Sakya, Kagyu and Nyingma, including many near-extinct teachings. Without Khyentse and Kongtrul's collecting and printing of rare works, the suppression of Buddhism by the Communists would have been much more final. The Rimé movement is responsible for a number of scriptural compilations, such as the Rinchen Terdzod and the Sheja Dzö.

== Modern history (20th–21st centuries) ==
=== 20th century – de facto independence, Chinese occupation, and Tibetan exodus ===
Following the collapse of the Qing dynasty in 1912, the 13th Dalai Lama, Thubten Gyatso, declared Tibet's de facto independence. Tibet maintained its own government, currency, and military, exercising control over its territory until 1951, although it lacked formal international recognition. In October 1950, the People's Liberation Army of the newly established People's Republic of China invaded eastern Tibet. This led to the signing of the Seventeen Point Agreement in May 1951, which affirmed Chinese sovereignty over Tibet while ostensibly guaranteeing autonomy and religious freedom.

Tensions escalated over the following years, culminating in a major uprising in Lhasa in March 1959. Fearing for his safety, the 14th Dalai Lama, Tenzin Gyatso, fled Tibet on 17 March 1959, disguised as a soldier. After a perilous journey across the Himalayas, he reached India on 31 March, where he was granted asylum. Subsequently, he established a government-in-exile in Dharamsala.

The Tibetan diaspora that followed the 1959 uprising led to the global dissemination of Tibetan Buddhism. Many high-ranking lamas and monastics resettled in India, Nepal, Bhutan, and Western countries, establishing centers and teaching Tibetan Buddhism to new audiences. This period marked the beginning of a significant Western interest in Tibetan Buddhist philosophy and practice. The 14th Dalai Lama became an international symbol of peace and Tibetan identity, advocating for nonviolence, human rights, and interfaith dialogue. His efforts were recognized in 1989 when he was awarded the Nobel Peace Prize.

=== 21st century – exile and spread abroad ===
Today, Tibetan Buddhism continues to thrive both within and outside the Tibetan Plateau. It remains the predominant religion in Tibet, Bhutan, and Mongolia, and has significant followings in northern Nepal, the Indian regions of Sikkim, Ladakh, and Arunachal Pradesh, as well as in parts of Russia such as Kalmykia, Tuva, and Buryatia.

In exile, Tibetan Buddhist institutions have adapted to new cultural contexts, particularly in Western countries, where numerous centers and monasteries have been established. The religion's emphasis on compassion, mindfulness, and philosophical inquiry has resonated with global audiences, leading to a growing international community of practitioners. The 14th Dalai Lama continues to be a prominent spiritual leader, engaging in dialogues on ethics, science, and global responsibility. Despite relinquishing political authority in 2011, he remains a central figure in advocating for the preservation of Tibetan culture and autonomy within the framework of the People's Republic of China.

== See also ==
- Schools of Buddhism
- buddhism in Bhutan
