= Joseph Roccasalvo =

American author, academic and retired priest

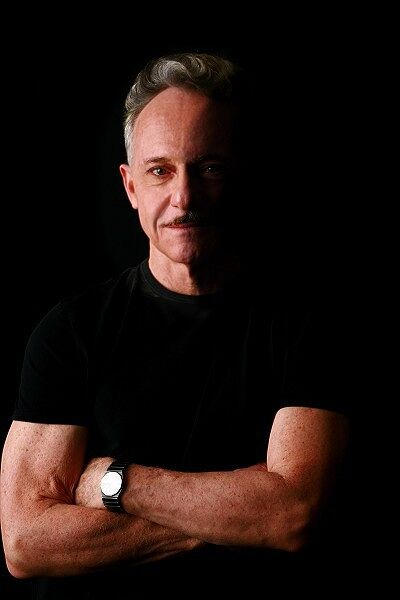
Joseph Roccasalvo, ca. 2017.

Joseph F. Roccasalvo (born December 9, 1940) is an American author, academic, and retired Catholic priest. He is best known for writing books and articles discussing theology, spirituality, and literature. Roccasalvo has also been affiliated with multiple academic institutions, including Manhattanville College, Fordham University and Loyola University Chicago.

== Early life and education ==
Roccasalvo was born in Brooklyn, New York to an Italian-American family and resided in the neighborhood of Sheepshead Bay. He attended the Jesuit Brooklyn Preparatory School and graduated in 1958.

After his secondary education, Roccasalvo joined the Society of Jesus, completing his novitiate years at Bellarmine College (now Clinton Community College) in 1962. He enrolled in Fordham University and finished degrees in Classics and English Literature in 1964, along with a graduate degree in English literature in 1965. From 1965 to 1968, he taught French and theology at Brooklyn Preparatory School during his regency years, followed by three years of theology studies to obtain his MDiv in Theology at Woodstock College.

== Academic career ==
Roccasalvo applied and gained admission to the Harvard Graduate School of Arts and Sciences in 1972 where he resided at the Center for the Study of World Religions. There, under Masatoshi Nagatomi, he completed his Ph.D. in Comparative Religion in 1978; his dissertation was titled "The Anatta Doctrine: A Textual and Contextual Interpretation". For part of his program, he lived in Thailand to do research and taught at Mahidol University. His academic publications during his early career were in exploring the religious contrasts and correspondences between the two philosophies of Moheyan and Kamalaśīla in the Council of Lhasa.

He served as a priest at Loyola University Chicago where he was also an adjunct associate professor of comparative religion for the summer session at the Institute of Pastoral Studies from 1979 through 1999. He was an assistant professor of History of Religions and Buddhist Studies at Manhattanville College from 1979 to 1985; he also held an associate professor position at Fordham University and adjunct positions at Columbia University and Queens College.

== Literary works and mentoring ==
Roccasalvo is a hyperpolyglot, having professional working proficiency in 10 languages, including Hebrew, Latin, Sanskrit and Pali. He has served as a graduate student mentor and shared his experiences about mentoring with the New School Free Press.

According to his website, he has published five novels including Fire in a Windless Place, Chartreuse, Portrait of a Woman, The Odor of Sanctity and The Devil’s Interval. Two novellas, The Powers That Be and Beyond the Pale were printed as Double Entendre. There followed three books of short stories: Outward Signs, The Mansions of Limbo, and Triple Sec. Two solo performances, Waging Waugh and Gospel Limericks, appeared as Two for One and were followed by two memoirs, As It Were and The Province of Memory. Two further novellas have been published: Island of the Assassin and Alina in Ecstasy; likewise, his collected poetry in Poems For Two Violins and It Comes in Tides. His collected short stories are entitled, Twists of Faith. In 2020, he won the International Association of Top Professionals (IAOTP) Top Fiction Writer of the Year.

== Bibliography ==
- Roccasalvo, Joseph F. (1980). Greek and Buddhist Wisdom: An Encounter between East and West. International Philosophical Quarterly 20(1):73-85. doi: 10.5840/ipq19802013
- Roccasalvo, Joseph F. (1980). The debate at bsam yas: A study in religious contrast and correspondence. Philosophy East and West 30(4):505-520. JSTOR: 1398975
- Roccasalvo, J. F. (1980–1981). The Thai practice of psychiatry and the doctrine of anattā. . Review of Existential Psychology & Psychiatry, 17(2–3), 153–168. https://psycnet.apa.org/record/1984-26569-001
- Roccasalvo, J.F. (1982). The terminology of the soul (attā): A psychiatric recasting. Journal of Religion and Health 21, 206–218. doi: 10.1007/BF02274180
