= Joseph F. Kett =

American historian

Joseph Francis Kett
- Born: 11 March 1938; New York City, U.S.
- Died: April 2024 (aged 86); United States, U.S.
- Education: College of the Holy Cross (BA); Harvard University (MA, PhD)
- Occupation: Historian

Joseph Francis Kett (11 March 1938 – April 2024) was an American historian, bestselling author, academic and university professor.

== Life ==
Kett was born on March 11, 1938 in New York City. He was the son of Joseph Francis and Anne Kett.

Kett attended the Brooklyn Preparatory High School in New York City. He graduated from the College of the Holy Cross with a Bachelor of Arts, magna cum laude, in 1959, then earned a Master of Arts in 1960 and his Ph.D. in history in 1964 from Harvard University.

He was married to Eleanor Kett. He died in April 2024 at the age of 86.

== Career ==
He served as the James Madison professor emeritus of history at the Corcoran Department of History of the University of Virginia.

== Awards and honors ==
He received the Alumni Association Distinguished Professor Award of the University of Virginia in 1995.

== Bibliography ==
He is the author of a number of notable books:

- The New Dictionary of Cultural Literacy: What Every American Needs to Know
- The Enduring Vision: A History of the American People
- Rites Of Passage
- The Formation of the American Medical Profession: The Role of Institutions, 1780-1860
- Pursuit of Knowledge Under Difficulties: From Self-Improvement to Adult Education in America
- Merit : the history of a founding ideal from the American Revolution to the twenty-first century
