= Kim Hwasang =

Kim Hwasang (Korean: 김화상; Hanja: 金和尙), also known in Chinese as Wuxiang (Chinese: 浄衆無相; pinyin: Jìngzhòng Wūxiāng, or Musang in Korean: 무상; Hanja: 無相, 684–762), was a Korean master of Chan Buddhism who lived in Sichuan, China, whose form of Chan teaching was independent of East Mountain Teaching and Huineng. His teachings were amongst the first streams of Chan Buddhism transmitted to Tibet.

== Chan, the Tangut and Kim Hwasang ==
Solonin links the Tangut people, the Helan Mountains and Baotang Wuzhu:

The origins of the Tangut Chan can be also traced deeper, than it was previously believed: information on Bao-tang Wu-zhu (保唐无住720~794) travels in North-Western China from the Notes on Transmitting the Dharma Treasure through Generations implies that at the period of 760's some sort of Buddhism was spread in the region of Helanshan, where the Tangut were already residing. Concerning the late 8th century Helanshan Buddhism, little can be said: the doctrines of the lu (律) school and the teaching of Sichuan Chan of Rev. Kim (金和尚) seem to be known there.

Yün-Hua Jan (1986: pp. 27–28) states:

Although Shen-hui has advanced the concept of no-thought in his teachings, the concept only remains as one of the principal doctrines. There are still a number of other ideas that are equally important in his thought. It was in the two schools of Ch'an Buddhism, developed in Shu state (presently Ssuchwan) that have given further attention to the concept. In fact these two schools made no-thought as the exclusive doctrine of their teachings. The one who initiated the development was Wu-hsiang (684-762), originally a native of the Silla kingdom in the Korean peninsula and more well-known in China as Monk Kim.

Buswell (2005: p. 191) states:

Such contacts between Chinese and Korean Buddhism are especially pronounced in the case of the Ch'an or Sŏn tradition of Sinitic Buddhism. Two of the earliest schools of Ch'an in China were the Ching-chung and Pao-t'ang, both centered in what was then the wild frontier of Szechwan in the southwest. Both factions claimed as their patriarch a Ch'an master of Korean heritage named Musang (Ch. Wu-hsiang; 684-762), who is better known to the tradition as Reverend Kim (Kim hwasang), using his native Korean surname. Musang reduced all of Ch’an teachings to the three phrases of "not remembering," which he equated with morality, "not thinking," with samādhi, and "not forgetting," with wisdom. Even after his demise, Musang’s teachings continued to be closely studied by such influential scholiasts in the Ch’an tradition as Tsung-mi (780-841).

== Transmission of Chan to the Nyingma school ==
Chan Buddhism was introduced to the Nyingma school of Tibetan Buddhism in three principal streams: the teachings of Kim Hwashang transmitted by Sang Shi in c750 CE; the lineage of Baotang Wuzhu was transmitted within Tibet by Yeshe Wangpo; and the teaching of Moheyan, which were a synthesis of the East Mountain and Baotang schools.

Legend states that Trisong Detsen (742–797) invited Moheyan to teach at Samye. Moheyan had been teaching at Dunhuang, which the Tibetan Empire had conquered in 786, but he lost an important philosophical debate on the nature of emptiness from the Indian master Kamalaśīla and the king declared Kamalaśīla's philosophy should form the basis for Tibetan Buddhism rather than Chan. This legendary "great debate" was known as "the Council of Lhasa" and is narrated and depicted in a specific cham dance held annually at Kumbum Monastery, Qinghai.

Ray (2005) holds that the first documented dissemination of Chan to Tibet, chronicled in what has become known as the Statements of the Sba Family, occurred around 761 when Trisong Detsen sent a party to Yizhou to receive the teachings of Kim Hwashang, whom they encountered in Sichuan. The party received teachings and three Chinese texts from Kim, who died soon after.
