= Masatoshi Nagatomi =

Japanese professor of Buddhist studies (1926–2000)

Masatoshi Nagatomi (September 1, 1926 – June 3, 2000) was a Japanese professor of Buddhist studies at Harvard University. He was also known by his nickname "Mas." Nagatomi is remembered for introducing the term Nikaya Buddhism as a replacement for Hinayana Buddhism, a historical term for non-Mahayana sects of Buddhism that many modern Buddhists consider derogatory.

== Early years ==
Nagatomi was born in the village of Kuroi, Yamaguchi Prefecture, Japan. As the eldest son, he was presumed successor of the family's Jōdo Shinshū temple. In his youth, Nagatomi spent much time studying Buddhist sutras in preparation for becoming abbot.

His father Shinjō Nagatomi became a Buddhist missionary first in Canada and later in the United States, where Nagatomi moved with the rest of his family, settling in San Francisco, California.

== World War II ==
Nagatomi was fifteen years old at the time of the Attack on Pearl Harbor, having traveled alone to visit relatives in rural Yamaguchi Prefecture. He found himself unable to return to the United States due to the outbreak of hostilities in the country. His parents were soon interned at Manzanar, California, where his father became chief priest and community leader.

He would occasionally receive letters from his father through the International Red Cross, providing news about his parents and sisters. In 1943, he was informed of the birth of another sister—Shinobu—that happened within the camp.

Nagatomi was conscripted to the Kobe Shipyard, where he and his colleagues suffered harsh labor conditions and starvation. He was eventually granted a brief leave to visit his relatives. The train he took passed through Hiroshima city on August 6, 1945, the same day the atomic bomb was dropped.

== Career ==
Nagatomi was accepted as an undergraduate at Ryukoku University. He later transferred to Kyoto University where he received his B.A. in Indian Philosophy and Buddhism.

After the war, he returned to the US and married Masumi Mary Kimura.

Upon settling down in Cambridge, Massachusetts, he was accepted into Harvard University. In 1957, he received his Ph.D. under the supervision of Sanskrit scholar Daniel Ingalls. His dissertation was entitled "An English Translation and Annotation of the Pramânasiddhi Chapter of Dharmakîrti’s Pramânavârttika."

In 1958, Masatoshi joined the faculty at Harvard as Instructor of Sanskrit. In 1969 he was appointed Harvard's first full-time Professor of Buddhist Studies. With a thirty-eight year tenure, he became affiliated with the Department of East Asian Languages and Civilizations, Harvard Divinity School, and the Center for the Study of World Religions. He was also an active member of the American Oriental Society, the American Academy of Religion, and the International Association of Shin Buddhist Studies. In 1986, Nagatomi founded the Harvard Buddhist Studies Forum.

Although Nagatomi was not a prolific writer, he devoted a great deal of time mentoring a generation of prospective scholars of Indo-Tibetan Buddhism and Sino-Japanese Buddhism. He was instrumental in developing the field of Buddhist Studies, and several contemporary scholars studied under his guidance, such as Robert Thurman, Alexander Berzin, Stanley Weinstein, Jeffrey Hopkins, Jan Nattier, Alfred Bloom, Joseph Roccasalvo, Peter N. Gregory, Andrew Olendzki, Duncan Ryūken Williams, and Glenn Wallis.

== Later years ==
Nagatomi later went on to become an advisor at the Institute of Buddhist Studies in Berkeley, California, the Society for Buddhist-Christian Studies, and Tricycle magazine.

He retired in 1996 and died June 3, 2000, at the age of 73.

== Bibliography ==
- Nagatomi, Masatoshi (1979). "Mānasa-Pratyakşa: A Conundrum in the Buddhist Pramāṇa System". Sanskrit and Indian Studies. Vol. 2. pp. 243–260. doi:10.1007/978-94-009-8941-2_14. ISBN 978-94-009-8943-6.
