= Cemetery of the Holy Rood =

Cemetery in Westbury, Nassau County, New York

Coordinates: 40°45′03″N 73°35′04″W

The Cemetery of the Holy Rood is a Catholic cemetery located in Westbury, New York. The 65-acre (0.26 km^{2}) cemetery, established in 1930, is part of the Catholic Diocese of Rockville Centre.

== History ==
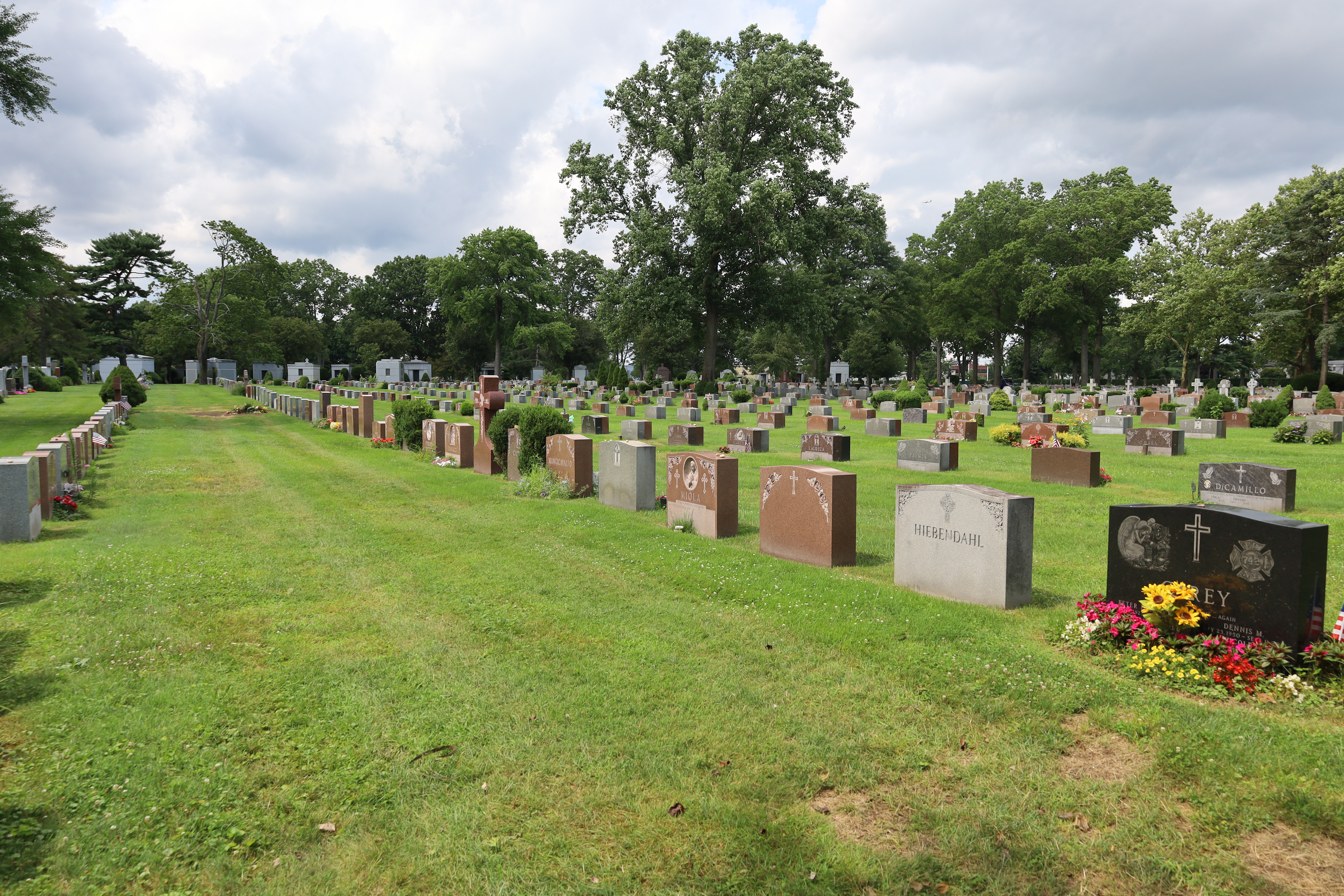
Graves in Section 7

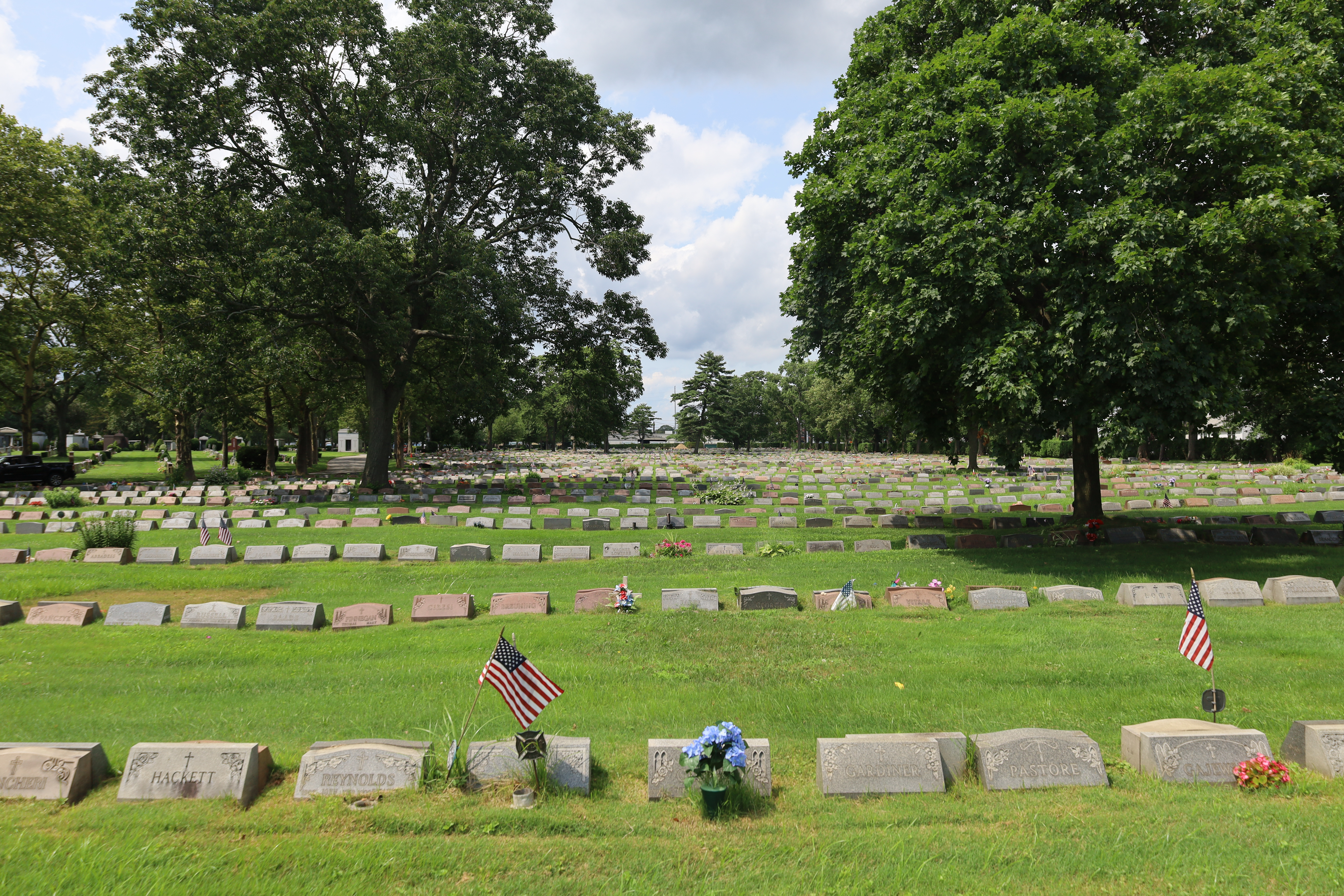
Graves in Sections 19 and 20

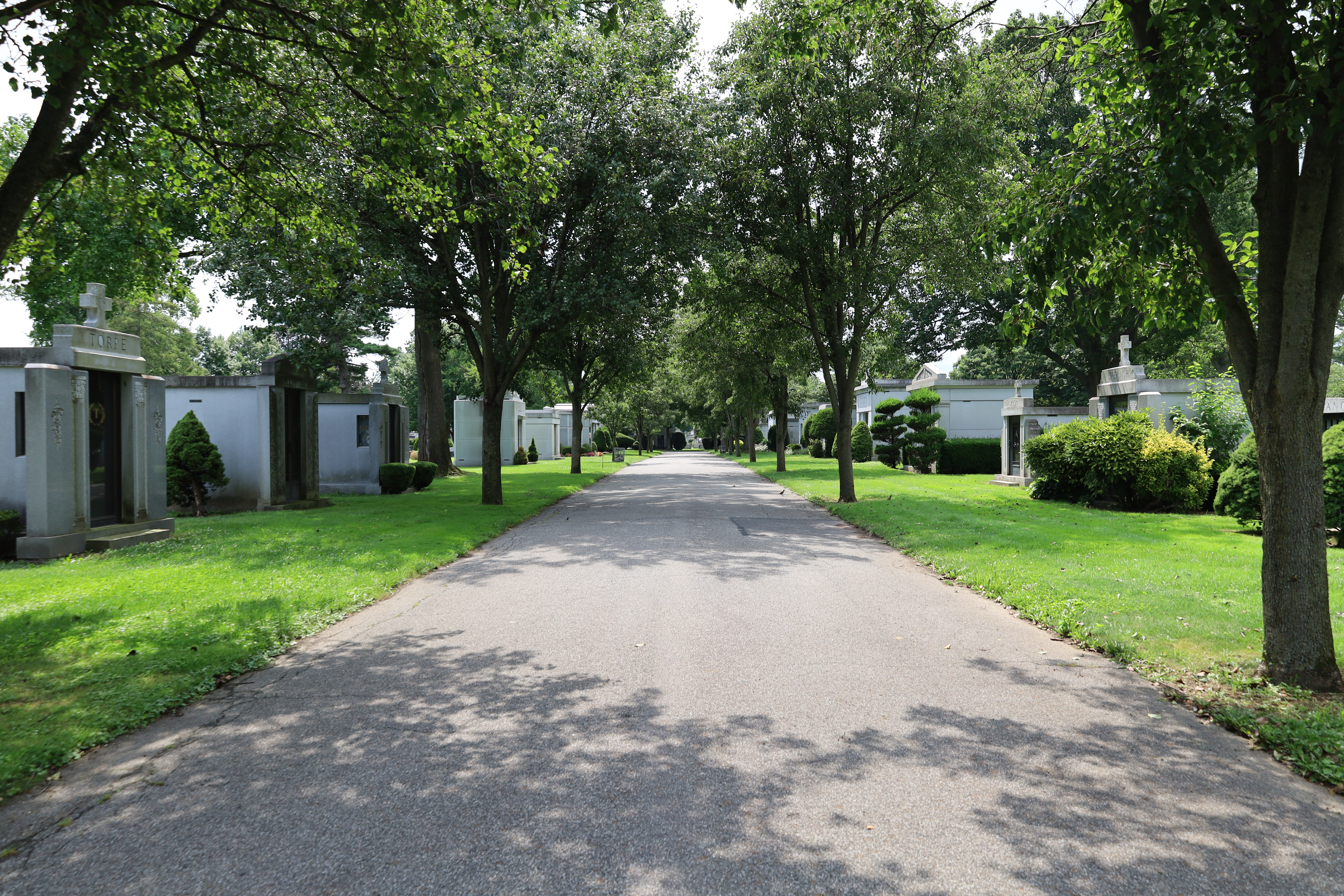
Mausolea in Sections 6 and 7

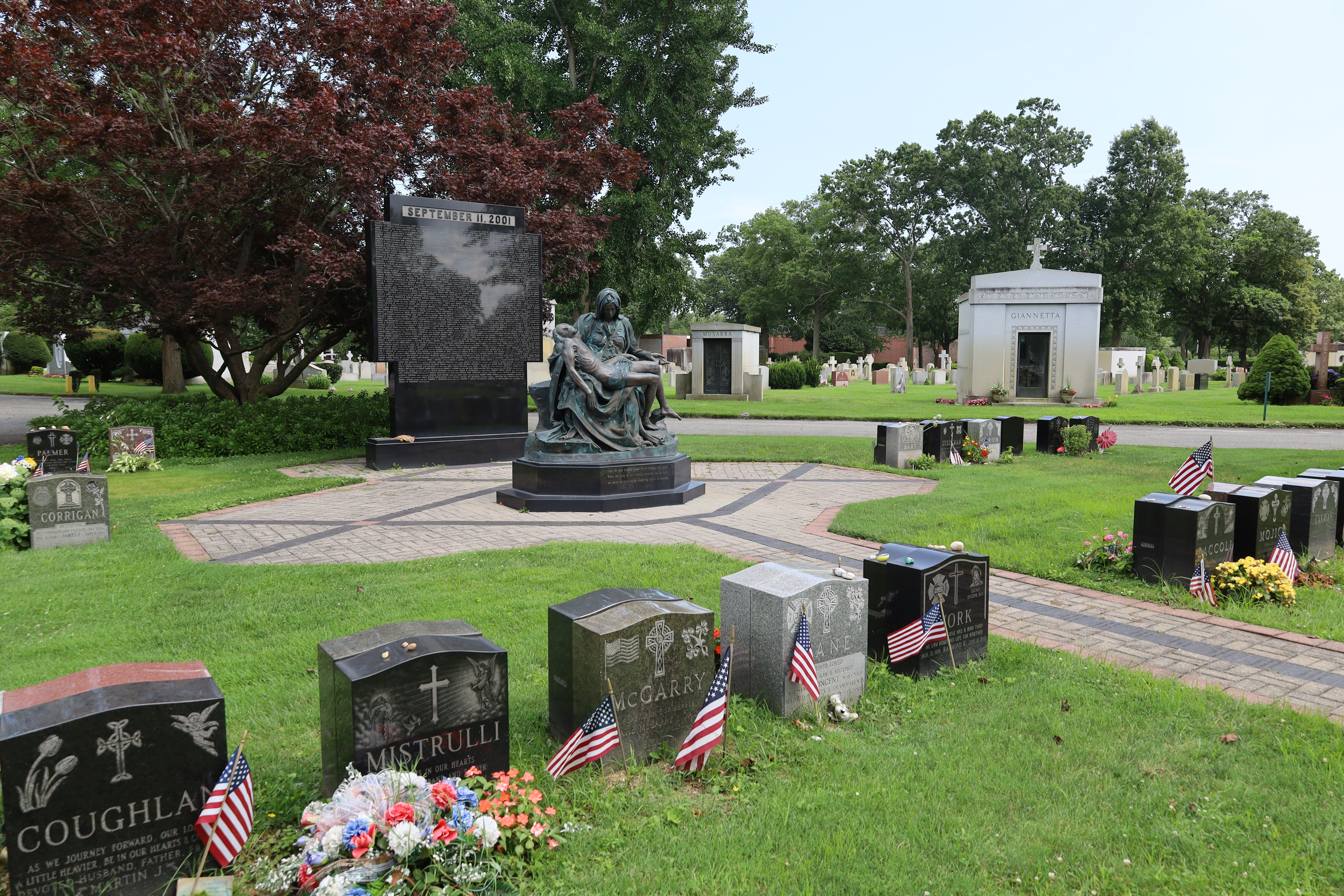
September 11 memorial and graves

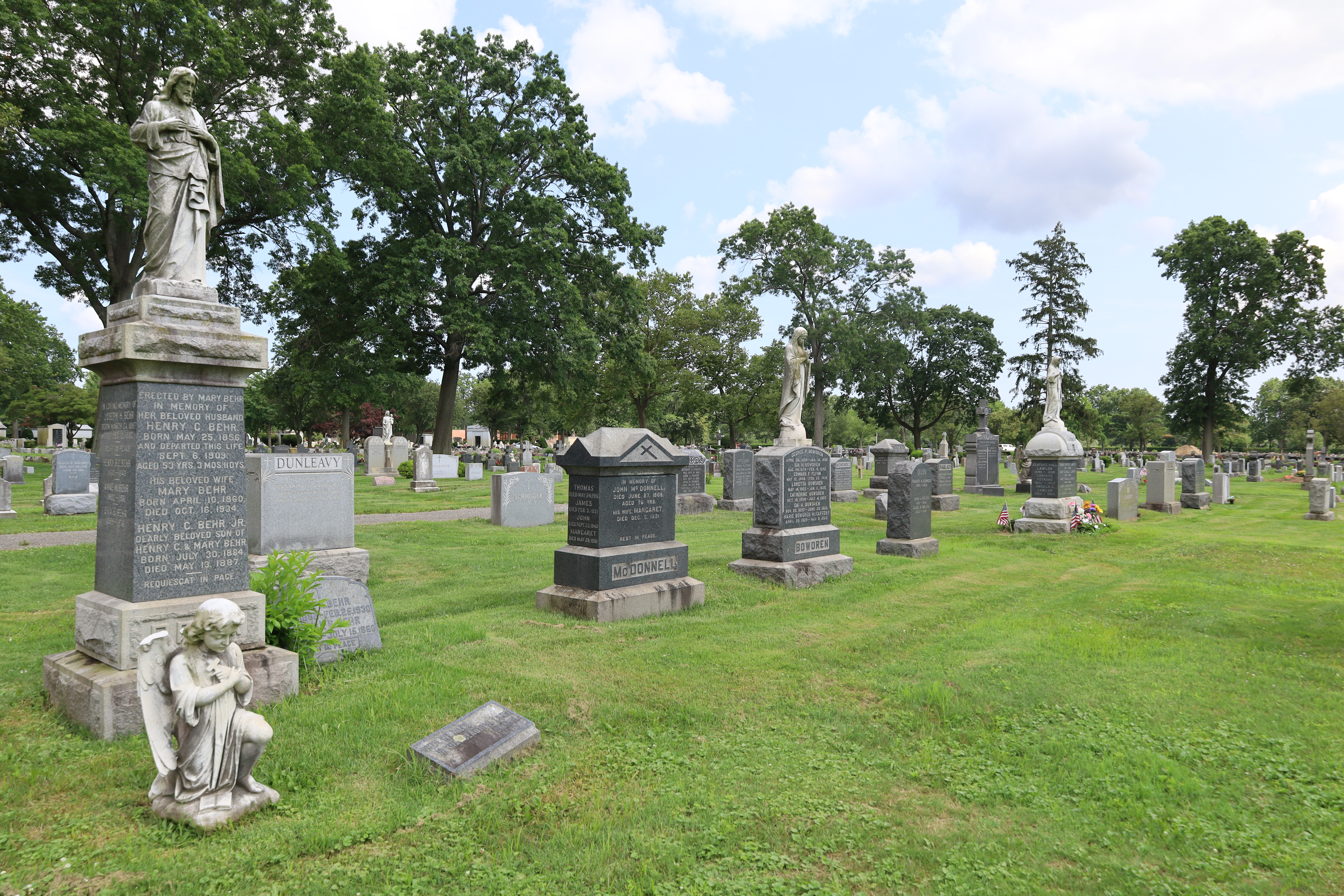
Graves in the St. Brigid Section

The oldest part of the cemetery was originally the burial grounds of Saint Brigid's Cemetery (formerly a part of Saint Brigid's Roman Catholic Church), a cemetery founded in 1856 that was eventually absorbed into the assets-management of Cemetery of the Holy Rood or Catholic Cemeteries.

In the 1930s, the then-Diocese of Brooklyn established a 65-acre (260,000 m^{2}) cemetery named for the Holy Rood. The grounds of the cemetery are considered part of the greater Hempstead Plains. In 1956, with the creation of the Diocese of Rockville Centre, Holy Rood Cemetery's jurisdiction was transferred to the newly formed diocese.

In 1998, the Diocese of Rockville Centre caused a certain amount of controversy when it announced that mementos and toys could no longer be left on children's graves. Even though leaving such items on graves was always in violation of cemetery rules, officials had previously turned a blind eye to the practice in the children's section.

On March 1, 2016 the Diocese created a new corporation, Catholic Cemeteries of the Roman Catholic Diocese of Rockville Centre, Inc. On September 1, 2017 the assets of the former corporation were delivered to the new corporation along with the staff members entering the corporation on January 1, 2018. In February 2018 the newly formed corporation received its first appointed President Richard Bie.

== The Island of Hope ==
The cemetery contains a triangular grassy area called "The Island of Hope" for the burials of abandoned babies, nearly all of whom are the victims of neonaticide. It is owned by the Children of Hope Foundation, founded by Tim Jaccard, an ambulance medical technician with the Nassau County Police, to pay for funerals and marked graves for abandoned babies and children. As of 2007, 88 children were buried there.

== Notable burials ==
- Licia Albanese (1909–2014), Italian-born American operatic soprano
- Bernard J. Quinn, Brooklyn Catholic priest and advocate for African Americans
- Frank X. Altimari (1928–1998), Federal Judge
- Carl Braun, New York Knicks, professional basketball player (d. 2010)
- James Joseph Brown, mining engineer
- "Unsinkable Molly" Brown, survivor of the RMS Titanic sinking and estranged wife of James Joseph Brown
- William J. Casey, former Director of Central Intelligence
- Oleg Cassini, fashion designer
- Bob Chipman, Major League Baseball player
- Don Dunphy, boxing announcer
- Peter J. Ganci, Jr., FDNY Chief of Department (d. 9/11/2001 †)
- Tom Gorman, Major League Baseball pitcher
- Joseph A. Healey (1930–2005)
- Max Hirsch (1880–1969), American Hall of Fame racehorse trainer
- William J. Hirsch (1909–1997), American Hall of Fame racehorse trainer
- Matthew Ianniello (1920–2012), mobster
- George C. Lang (1947–2005), Medal of Honor recipient
- Joseph Lannin, former owner of the Boston Red Sox
- Frank McCormick, (1911–1982), Major League Baseball player
- Jay Monahan, television personality, husband of TV host Katie Couric
- Cliff Montgomery, American football player (d. 4/21/2005)
- Billy Murray, singer (1877–1954)
- Orio Palmer, FDNY firefighter (d. 9/11/2001 †)
- John Serry, (1915–2003), Italian-American musician and composer
- George M. Skurla, (1921–2001), aeronautical engineer, President Grumman Corporation
- Terig Tucci, composer and musician
- John W. Wydler, (1918–1955) member of the United States House of Representatives
- Sam Zoldak, (1918–1966), Major League Baseball player
