= Joseph A. Healey =

US Army major general

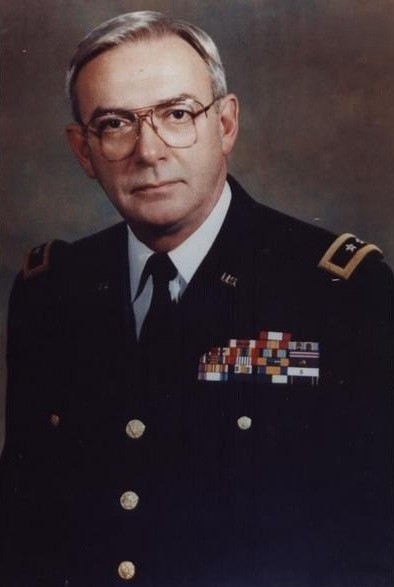
- Healey c. 1986
- Born: March 31, 1930; Brooklyn, New York, US
- Died: December 6, 2005 (aged 75); Rockville Centre, New York, US
- Burial place: Cemetery of the Holy Rood, Westbury, New York, US
- Alma mater: St. John's University; United States Army Command and General Staff College; United States Army War College
- Spouse: Claire Irene King (m. 1954–1998)
- Children: 5
- Military career
- Service: United States Army; New York Army National Guard
- Service years: 1948–1986
- Rank: Major General
- Unit: U.S. Army Infantry Branch
- Commands: Service Company, 71st New York Infantry Regiment; Combat Support Company, 71st Infantry Regiment; Headquarters and Headquarters Company, 42nd Infantry Division; 2nd Battalion, 69th Infantry Regiment; 1st Brigade, 42nd Infantry Division; 42nd Infantry Division; Headquarters Troop Command, New York Army National Guard
- Awards: Army Distinguished Service Medal; Army Meritorious Service Medal
- Other work: Director of Economic Development, New York Telephone Company

Joseph A. Healey (31 March 1930 – 6 December 2005) was a business executive and military officer from New York. A longtime member of the New York Army National Guard, he attained the rank of major general as commander of the 42nd Infantry Division. Healey served from 1948 to 1986, and his awards and decorations included the Army Distinguished Service Medal and Army Meritorious Service Medal.

A native of Brooklyn, Healey graduated from Brooklyn Preparatory School and received a bachelor's degree from St. John's University. In his civilian career, Healey was employed by New York Telephone, where he rose through the management ranks to become director of economic development.

Healey's military career began in 1948 when he enlisted as a private in the 71st Infantry Regiment of the New York Army National Guard. He attained the rank of sergeant first class before attending officer candidate school, from which he graduated in 1951. Commissioned as a second lieutenant of Infantry, Healey advanced through the National Guard's ranks to colonel in command and staff assignments that included command of two companies, a battalion, and a brigade. In 1976, he was assigned as assistant division commander of the 42nd Infantry Division with the rank of brigadier general. Healey commanded the division as a major general from 1978 to 1983. From 1983 until retiring from the military in 1986, Healey commanded the New York Army National Guard's Headquarters Troop Command.

Healey was a longtime resident of Rockville Centre, New York, where he continued to live after he retired. He died in Rockville Centre on 10 December 2005. Healey was buried at Cemetery of the Holy Rood in Westbury, New York.

== Early life ==
Joseph Andrew Healey was born in Brooklyn, New York on 31 March 1930, the son of Andrew E. Healey and Helen (Abbott) Healey. He was raised and educated in Brooklyn, and graduated from Brooklyn Preparatory School in 1947. In 1952, he graduated from St. John's University with a Bachelor of Arts degree in history.

Healey's civilian career was spent with New York Telephone, where he rose through the management and executive ranks to become the company's director of economic development. In 1948, Healey began his military career by enlisting as a private in the New York Army National Guard's 71st Infantry Regiment. He attained the rank of sergeant first class before attending officer candidate school (OCS), from which he graduated in 1951.

=== Family ===
In January 1954, Healey married Claire Irene King. They were married until her death in 1998. The Healeys were the parents of four daughters and a son.

== Start of career ==
After his OCS graduation, Healey was commissioned as a second lieutenant of Infantry and assigned as a platoon leader with Company B, 71st Infantry. In December 1952, he was assigned as leader of the intelligence and reconnaissance platoon of the 71st Infantry's Headquarters and Headquarters Company, and he was subsequently assigned as the company executive officer. He received promotion to first lieutenant in June 1954, and in February 1955 he was assigned as commander of the 71st Infantry's Service Company. Healey was promoted to captain in March 1956. In March 1963, he was appointed as assistant chief of staff for the 42nd Infantry Division, and he was promoted to major in April 1963.

=== Military education ===
Military education Healey completed during his career in uniform included:

- Infantry Officer Basic Course (1951)
- Infantry Officer Associate Course (1952)
- Infantry Officer Advanced Course (1968)
- United States Army Command and General Staff College (1972)
- Combat Division Refresher (1973)
- Military Police Senior Officers Civil Disturbance Orientation Course (1973)
- Infantry Senior Commander Orientation (1973)
- Armor Senior Officer Preventive Maintenance Course (1974)
- Infantry Command and Staff Officers Course (1975)
- United States Army War College Senior Reserve Components Officer Course (1976)
- Senior Field Artillery Officer Course (1976)

Healey also supplemented his military education with studies in national security at the Brookings Institution in 1964 and management at Harvard Business School in 1969.

== Continued career ==
In December 1968, Healey was assigned to command of 2nd Battalion, 69th Infantry Regiment, and he was promoted to lieutenant colonel in January 1969. In November 1972, he was appointed director of logistics at the New York Army National Guard headquarters, and he received promotion to colonel in December 1972. In March 1973, he was assigned to command the 42nd Infantry Division's 1st Brigade.

In April 1976, Healey was assigned as assistant division commander of the 42nd Infantry Division, and he was promoted to brigadier general in July 1976. In August 1978, he was appointed as division commander, and in February 1979, Healey was promoted to major general. He remained in command until July 1983, and was succeeded by Vincent W. Lanna. From 1983 until his July 1986 retirement, Healey commanded the New York Army National Guard's Headquarters Troop Command, the position held by Lanna prior to Lanna's assignment to division command.

Healey was a longtime resident of Rockville Centre, New York. He was chairman of disaster services for the American Red Cross of Greater New York, a past president of the New York Chamber of Commerce and Industry, and a member of the board of trustees of Molloy College, St. Francis College, and St. John's University. He also spearheaded the effort to restore Manhattan's Duffy Square, which honors Father Francis P. Duffy, the World War I chaplain of the 69th Infantry Regiment. Healey died in Rockville Centre on 6 December 2005. He was buried at Westbury, New York's Cemetery of the Holy Rood.

== Awards ==
Healey's federal awards and decorations included:

- Army Distinguished Service Medal
- Army Meritorious Service Medal
- National Defense Service Medal
- Armed Forces Reserve Medal
- Army Reserve Components Achievement Medal
- Army Service Ribbon
- Overseas Service Ribbon
- Army Reserve Components Overseas Training Ribbon

Among Healey's state awards were:

- New York Conspicuous Service Medal
- New York Meritorious Service Medal
- New York Military Commendation Medal
- New York State Long and Faithful Service Award
- New York State Recruiting Medal
- New York Exercise Support Ribbon

== Dates of rank ==
Healey's dates of rank were:

- Major General, 8 February 1979
- Brigadier General, 30 July 1976
- Colonel, 1 December 1972
- Lieutenant Colonel, 4 January 1969
- Major, 15 April 1963
- Captain, 3 March 1956
- First Lieutenant, 28 June 1954
- Second Lieutenant, 28 June 1951
- Enlisted service, 23 June 1948 to 27 June 1951
