= Brooklyn Preparatory School =

- Schola Praeparatoria Brooklyniensis
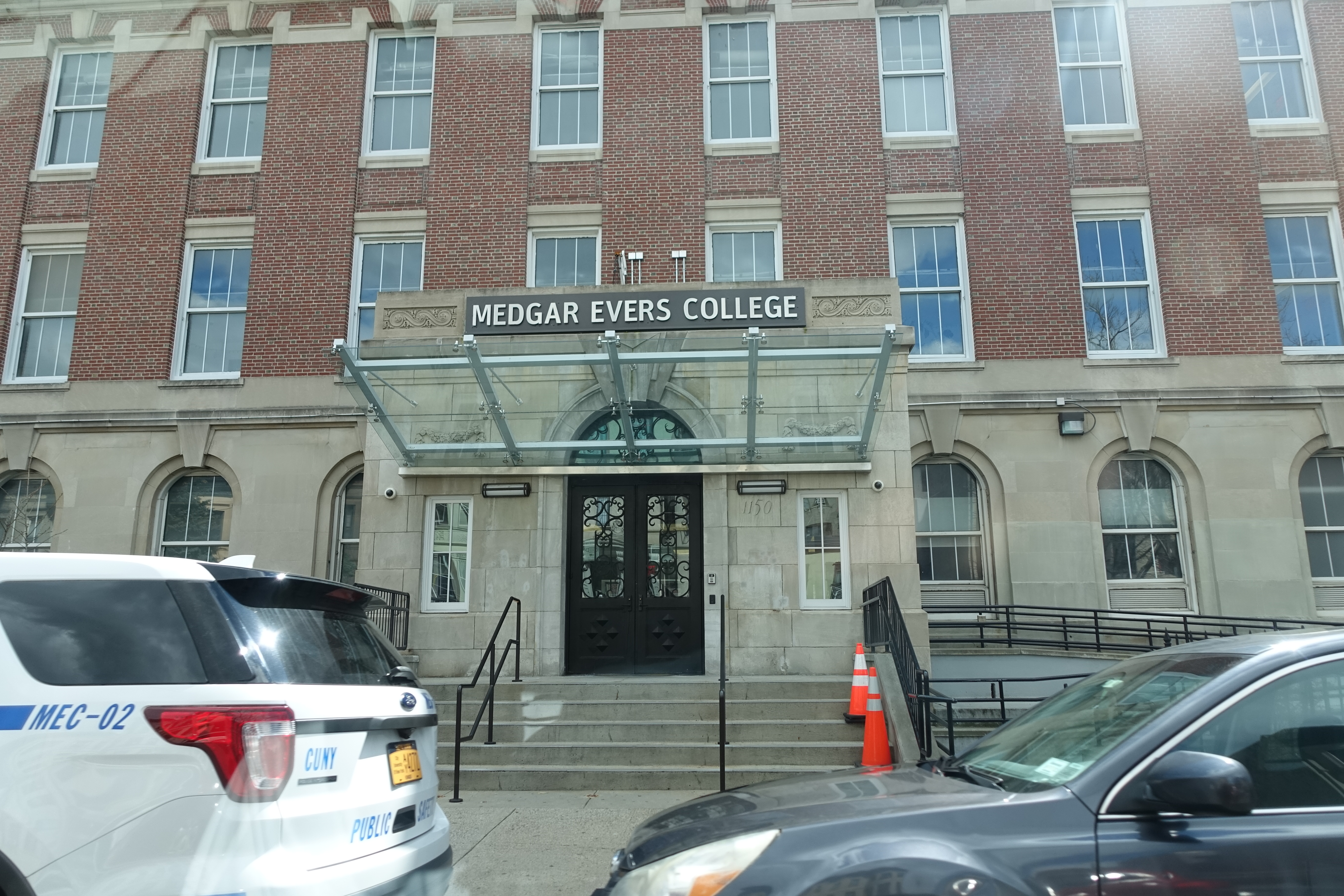
- The building in 2022, used by Medgar Evers College

Location
- 1150 Carroll Street; Crown Heights, Brooklyn; New York City, New York; United States; 40°40′1″N 73°57′9″W

Information
- Type: Private, all-male
- Motto: Sanctitas, Scientia, Sanitas (Holiness, Knowledge, Health)
- Religious affiliations: Roman Catholic; (Society of Jesus)
- Opened: 1908 (118 years ago)
- Closed: 1972 (54 years ago)
- Oversight: Jesuit Province of New York
- President: Rev. Eamon G. Taylor, SJ (1972)
- Headmaster: Rev. John D. Alexander, SJ (1972)
- Grades: 9–12
- Colors: Blue and white
- Song: "Blue and White Victory March"
- Athletics conference: CHSAA
- Sports: Baseball, basketball, football, hockey, swimming, tennis
- Team name: Eagles
- Publication: The Brooklyn Prep Magazine; Andros (literary magazine)
- Newspaper: Blue Jug
- Yearbook: Blue Book
- Communities served: Brooklyn, Long Island
- Graduates: 8,500+

Brooklyn Preparatory School, commonly referred to as Brooklyn Prep, was a highly selective Jesuit preparatory school in the Crown Heights neighborhood of Brooklyn in New York City. It was founded by the Society of Jesus in 1908. The school educated generations of young men from throughout New York City and Long Island until its closure in 1972. A new school of the same name now exists in the same borough.

== History ==
The Prep was located on 1150 Carroll Street in the Crown Heights section of Brooklyn, New York. The grounds and buildings are presently part of Medgar Evers College of the City University of New York (CUNY). Located next to the Prep was the Church of St. Ignatius Loyola, which was also run by the Jesuits and which was closed in 2011.

As a Jesuit institution, Brooklyn Prep was noted for its religious values, classical roots (e.g., Latin and Greek), and dress code (ties and jackets) – all part of its goal of turning out well-rounded, educated men. Most of its graduates matriculated to four-year colleges. For many years, the school offered a full $1,800 four-year scholarship to the winner of its annual "Diocesan Spelling Bee", which was open to all eighth grade male students from the Diocese of Brooklyn as well as the Diocese of Rockville Center.

The "Prep" was part of a group of eight Jesuit secondary schools in New York and New Jersey (Regis, Xavier, Loyola, Fordham Prep, St. Peter's Prep, Canisius and McQuaid).

The school closed in 1972, but its 100th anniversary of the school was celebrated by alumni and former faculty in October 2008.

In 2003, New York Nativity began Brooklyn Jesuit Prep, a co-educational middle school. BJP operated in the former St. Teresa's School at Sterling Place and Classon Avenue in Crown Heights until 2020. BJP then moved to the former St. Vincent Ferrer school building at 37th and Glenwood in East Flatbush. BJP continues to provide Jesuit education for 5th through 8th grades. All students receive a substantial scholarship to attend.

== Notable alumni ==
Among Brooklyn Prep's notable alumni are:

- John Agresto, 1963 - President of St. John's College in Santa Fe
- Robert S. Bennett, 1957 – Washington, D.C., attorney
- William Peter Blatty, 1945 – author of The Exorcist
- Joseph Califano, 1948 – former Secretary of Health, Education and Welfare
- Ken Charles, 1969 - played in NBA for Buffalo Braves and Atlanta Hawks
- John Dockery, 1962 - NFL player and sportscaster
- William P. Ford, 1953 – international civil rights attorney
- Joseph A. Healey, 1947 – US Army major general
- Jack Hofsiss, 1967 – director of The Elephant Man
- Peter T. King, 1961 - U.S. House of Representatives
- Joseph M. McLaughlin, 1950 – Senior Appellate Judge, Second Circuit
- John Musto, 1972 – composer, concert pianist; 1997 Pulitzer Prize in Music finalist
- Joe Paterno, 1944 – football coach at Penn State for 45 years
- Joseph Roccasalvo, 1940 – author, academic, and retired priest
- John Sexton, 1959 – President of New York University
- George A. Sheehan, 1936 – best-selling running and fitness expert
- Raymond Siller, 1956 – television writer, political consultant
- Curtis Sliwa, attended – American political candidate, radio talk show host, and founder of the Guardian Angels.

== Notable faculty ==
Noted faculty included:

- Rev. Thomas V. Bermingham, SJ – classical scholar; professor at Georgetown University and Fordham University who worked on The Exorcist
- Rev. Daniel Berrigan, SJ – peace activist; author and poet
- Rev. Edward B. Bunn, SJ – dean of Brooklyn Prep and later president of Loyola University Maryland and Georgetown University
- Rev. J. Charles Davey, SJ – first dean of Brooklyn Prep and president of Saint Joseph's University
- John C. Lawn – varsity basketball coach, who became Drug Enforcement Administration Administrator, COO of the New York Yankees, and CEO of The Century Council
