= Gyatso =

Origin
- Origin: Tibetan
- Meaning: Ocean

Gyatso or Gyamtso (Tibetan: རྒྱ་མཚོ, Wylie: rgya mtsho, ZWPY: Gyamco), is a Tibetan personal name meaning "ocean". It is also written Rgya-mtsho in Wylie transliteration, Gyaco in Tibetan pinyin, Gyatsho in Tournadre Simplified Phonetic Transcription and Gyatso in THDL Simplified Phonetic Transcription. In the Lhasa dialect, it is pronounced [càtsʰo] or [càmtsʰo]. In accordance with the latter pronunciation, it can also be spelled "Gyamtso" in English.

Notable persons whose names include "Gyatso" include:

- Each Dalai Lama, other than the 1st, has had Gyatso as the second word of his name, as "Gyatso" is the Tibetan translation of "Dalai". For instance, the current Dalai Lama is named Tenzin Gyatso. See the list of Dalai Lamas;
- Chödrak Gyatso, the 7th Karmapa;
- Chögyam Trungpa (Chögyam is short for Chögyi Gyamtso), Buddhist teacher;
- Geshe Kelsang Gyatso, the founder of the New Kadampa Tradition (NKT);
- Khenpo Tsültrim Gyamtso, a Karma Kagyu lama;
- Palden Gyatso, a monk who served thirty-three years as a political prisoner
- Desi Sangye Gyatso, 17th century political figure
- Geshe Sherab Gyatso, 20th century Communist politician
- Thubten Gyatso, an Australian Gelug monk.
- Monk Gyatso, a character from the Nickelodeon cartoon Avatar: The Last Airbender.

Other entities with a similar name:

- Gyamco, village in Tibet
