= Bhāvanākrama =

The Bhāvanākrama (Bhk, "cultivation process" or "stages of meditation"; Tib. སྒོམ་རིམ་, sGom Rim) is a set of three Buddhist texts written in Sanskrit by the Indian Buddhist scholar yogi Kamalashila (c. 9th century CE) of Nalanda university. These works are the principal texts for mental development and the practice of shamatha and vipashyana in Tibetan Buddhism and have been "enormously influential". The texts survive in full Tibetan translation, part 1 and 3 also survive in Sanskrit. The Bhāvanākramas are also one of the favorite texts of the 14th Dalai Lama, who has translated and written a commentary on the middle Bhk.

== Outline ==
According to Martin T. Adam "taken as a whole the Bhāvanākramas appear to constitute a kind of apology or justification for a gradualist approach to the Mahayana Buddhist goal of Awakening." In the Tibetan tradition they are seen as outlining Kamalashila's refutation of the Chinese Chan doctrine of sudden enlightenment which is said to have occurred during a series of debates at Samye (C. 792-794), Tibet's first Buddhist monastery. Kamalashila's main argument is that one must gradually cultivate the causes and conditions which make the arrival of awakening possible. Two aspects of the path are necessary, moral cultivation of the paramitas and "the discernment of reality" (bhutapratyaveksa) through the practice of tranquility and insight meditation. In Kamalashila's attacks against his opponents, he tries to show their approach is lacking elements of these two key aspects of cultivation and is thus a lower teaching or Sravakayana.

The first book consists of a summary of Mahayana doctrine and teachings and the three kinds of wisdom (associated with study, thinking and meditation), the second book focuses on cultivation (bhavana) and method (upaya) and the third book explains the fruit of the meditative path - wisdom (prajña). Kamalashila opens the first book by stating: "The Bhāvanākramas is briefly set forth with regard to the regulation of conduct of a beginner in the Mahayana sutras." Other important topics include compassion, bodhicitta, and the Bodhisattva stages.

An overview of the path outlined by Kamalashila is as follows:

1. Meditation on great compassion
2. Generation of bodhicitta
3. Importance of practice
4. Practicing samatha
5. Practicing vipassana
6. Accumulation of merit
7. Practice of skillful means
8. Attainment of perfect enlightenment as a result by integrated practice of wisdom and compassion.

== English Translations ==
- Stephen Beyer (1974), Bhk 1.
- Yen. Geshe Sopa (1998, with Yen. Elvin Jones and John Newman), Bhk 2.
- His Holiness the Dalai Lama (2001, trans. Yen. Geshe Lobsang Jorhen, Losang Choephel Ganchenpa, and Jeremy Russell), Bhk 2.
- Thrangu Rinpoche, Essential Practice: Lectures on Kamalashila's Stages of Meditation (2002), Bhk 2.
- Robert F. Olson and Masao Ichishima (1979), Bhk 2.
- Parmananda Sharma (1997), Bhāvanākrama of Kamalaśila (full translation of all three books).

== See also ==
- Buddhist meditation
- Mahayana
- Samatha
- Vipassana
