= Samye Debate =

The Samye Debate was a two year debate held at Samye Monastery from 792-794 that argued the best method for achieving Enlightenment in Buddhism. The debate was called by Trisong Detsen to resolve the escalating argument between Santaraksita's Indian Buddhist school and Moheyan's Chan school of Tang China. Trisong Detsen judged in favor of Santaraksita's school, and Moheyan and his school therefore had to leave Tibet.

The extant accounts of the debate differ on the details of its proceedings, while the debate's historicity is contested by some. The various accounts agree that the debate was hosted by Trisong Detsen at Samye Monastery and consisted of two philosophical schools: the suddenists, represented by the Tang China monk Moheyan, and Santaraksita's students called the gradualists, represented in the debate by the student and Indian monk Kamalasila. The accounts also agree that the Tang China Chan school lost the debate.

In 1952, a book was published that began to erroneously refer to the Samye Debate as the Council of Lhasa, but a debate is not a council, and Samye Monastery where the two year debate was held is 120 kilometers from Lhasa.

== Accounts ==
The debate is discussed in many historical Tibetan sources. Among these and others are:

- The Testament of Ba
- The History of Buddhism in India and its spread to Tibet by Buton Rinchen Drub, written c. 1356
- The Debate on Sudden Awakening in the Great Vehicle (頓悟大乘正理決 Ch. Dunwu dasheng zhengli jue) by Wangxi 王錫 based on Paul Demieville's article "Le concile de Lhasa"
- The Chöjung Metok Nyingpo of Nyangrel Nyima Özer
- Pudön's History of Buddhism

== Outcome ==
Tibetan sources all agree that Trisong Detsen judged in favor of Kamalasila. These sources also agree that Moheyan and his school, as the debate's losers, were prohibited from teaching in Tibet and had to "leave from here", as the king had warned the opposing sides. A standard practice in debating is that a debate's loser adopts the position of the winner. At the Samye Debate, the king announced that the loser would have to leave Tibet.

Santaraksita's gradualist philosophy as represented by his student Kamalasila continued to flourish in Tibet.

Both modern authors Wangxi and Powers believe that Moheyan committed suicide shortly after the debate, but Tibetan historical sources such as Buton do not state that. Buton writes that Moheyan after departing Tibet sent four assassins into Tibet who murdered Kamalasila, by "squeezing his kidneys".

In Tibetan Buddhism, the debate is cited to explain why Tibet gravitated away from Chinese Buddhism, which had, after their defeat at the debate, been prohibited in Tibet.

== See also ==
- Samye Debate at Encyclopædia Britannica
