= Moheyan =

8th century Buddhist monk

Tibetan name
- Tibetan: ཧྭ་ཤང་མ་ཧཱ་ཡཱ་ན
Transcriptions
- Wylie: hwa shang ma hā yā na
- Tibetan Pinyin: Haxang Mahayana
- Lhasa IPA: [haɕaŋ mahajana]

Chinese name
- Traditional Chinese: 和尚摩訶衍
- Simplified Chinese: 和尚摩诃衍
Transcriptions
Standard Mandarin
- Hanyu Pinyin: Héshang Móhēyǎn

Heshang Moheyan (Chinese: 和尚摩訶衍; pinyin: Héshang Móhēyǎn) was a late 8th century Buddhist monk associated with the East Mountain Teaching. Moheyan (摩訶衍) is a brief translation of Mahayana in Chinese, so the name literally means a Mahayana monk. He became famous for representing Chan Buddhism in the so called "Council of Lhasa," a debate between adherents of the Indian teachings of "gradual enlightenment" and the Chinese teachings of "sudden enlightenment," which according to tradition was won by the "gradual teachings."

== Etymology ==
Hwashang is a Tibetan approximation of the Chinese héshàng "Buddhist monk (Chinese: 和尚). This, in turn, comes from the Sanskrit title upādhyāya "teacher". (Note: Chua, Ying (1998), Arhats. (accessed: January 14, 2008)])

== Biography ==
=== Dunhuang sojourn and question of lineage affiliation ===
Whilst the East Mountain Teachings (known as "Northern School" Chan) were in decline in China, having been attacked by Shenhui (a student of Huineng) as a supposed "gradual enlightenment" teaching, Moheyan traveled to Dunhuang, which at the time belonged to the Tibetan Empire, in 781 or 787. For Moheyan, this was a new opportunity for the spread of (Northern) Chan. However, as van Schaik observes, the exclusive association of Moheyan with the Northern School is problematic, as Moheyan may have actually counted Shenhui as one of his teachers, and texts containing Moheyan's teachings exhibit an attempt at harmonizing sudden and gradual aspects of practice.

Luis Gómez observes that while Moheyan's sectarian affiliations are unclear, he seems to have belonged to a late Northern branch which leaned strongly toward Southern Chan teachings. Gómez regards Moheyan as doctrinally closer to the sudden teaching of the Southern School than Northern gradualism. For Gómez, Moheyan's doctrinal stance is more important than his lineage affiliation, which he regards a matter of religious politics. There is also evidence that Moheyan had connections to the Baotang school. However, according to Gómez, the exclusive focus on "spiritual lineage" in the traditional sense overlooks that Moheyan was not trying to conform to a received doctrine. Gómez states rather that "he [Moheyan] was his own man, a moderately creative religious specialist who borrowed and innovated at will. The concepts of 'teacher' and 'lineage' serve a variety of ahistorical functions in his hagiography, as they do in that of so many other Buddhist masters—they are devices for recognizing or claiming inspiration, influence, and political and institutional allegiance."

=== Council of Lhasa ===
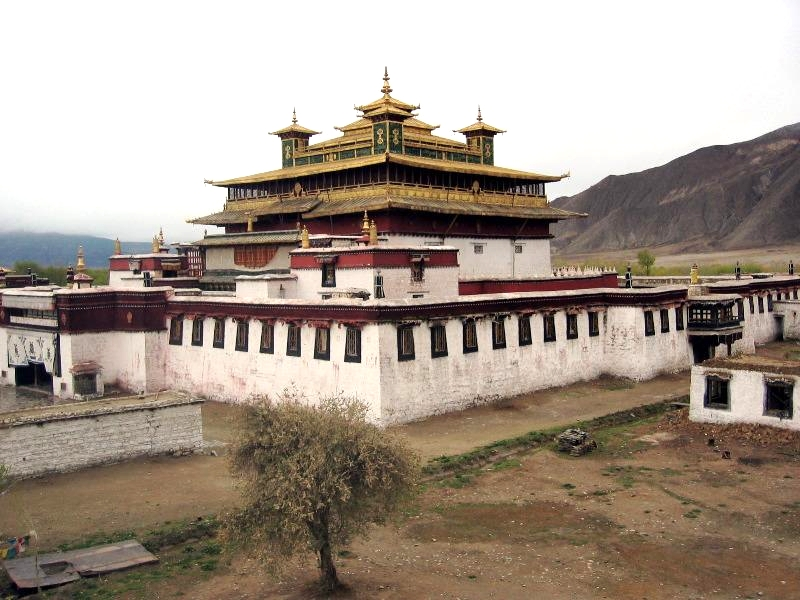
The main building of Samye

After teaching in the area of Dunhuang, Moheyan was invited by Trisong Detsen of the Tibetan Empire to settle at Samye, then the center of emerging Tibetan Buddhism. (Note: Sam van Schaik (2008), Tibetan Chan I: The Emperor's Chan) Moheyan promulgated a variety of Chan Buddhism and disseminated teachings from Samye where he attracted a considerable number of followers.

However, in 793 Trisong Detsen resolved that Moheyan did not hold the true Dharma. Following intense protests from Moheyan’s supporters, Trisong Detsen proposed to settle the matter by sponsoring a debate. (Note: Dialectic is an ancient aspect of the Indian and Chinese religions, as it is in Himalayan tradition.) The most famous of these debates has become known as the "Council of Lhasa", although it may have taken place at Samye, a considerable distance from Lhasa. For the famed Council of Lhasa, an Indian monk named Kamalaśīla was invited to represent Indian Buddhism, while Moheyan represented Chinese Chan Buddhism.

While Moheyan took a subitist approach to enlightenment. In this view, practices such as the perfection of morality, and studying Buddhist texts was seen as "gradualist", and Moheyan held that these were only necessary for those of "dim" facility and "dull" propensity. Those of "sharp" and "keen" facility and propensity do not need these practices, as they have "direct" access to the truth through meditation. This concession to the "gradualists", that not everyone can achieve the highest state of meditation, left Moheyan open to the charge that he had a dualistic approach to practice. To overcome these inconsistencies in his thesis, Moheyan claimed that when one gave up all conceptions, an automatic, all-at-once attainment of virtue resulted. He taught that there was an "internal" practice to gain insight and liberate one-self, and an "external" practice to liberate others (upaya, or skillful means). These were seen as two independent practices, a concession to human psychology and scriptural tradition.

According to José Cabezón:

In the so-called “Great Debate” that the sources tell us took place at the then newly founded monastery of Bsam yas between 792 and 794 c.e., the renowned Indian scholar Kamalaśīla is supposed to have debated the Chinese Ch’an master, Hwa shang Mahayana. The Tibetan sources tell us that the debate (shags) took place before the emperor. Kamalaśīla was the advocate of a “gradualist” (rim gyis pa) position, the view that enlightenment is attained through the incremental purification of the mind that takes place by the practice of the six perfections. This path, he held, requires analytical mental activity and a commitment to the intentional accumulation of merit. Hwa shang held the “simultaneist” (cig car ba) view—that (for advanced adepts at least) enlightenment is not attained gradually through the purification of the mind, that for these individuals analytical activity is a distraction and the accumulation of merit unnecessary. Instead, he claimed, enlightenment, as something that is already immanent in the individual, can immediately be accessed by directing the mind internally, by ceasing mentation, and by becoming aware of the nature of mind itself. Most of the Tibetan accounts tell us that Kamalashila won the debate, and this is said to have sealed the fate of Tibetan Buddhism forever. King Khri srong lde’u btsan, who served as “arbiter” or “judge” (dpang po) in the debate, declared that henceforth Tibetans would follow the Indian Buddhist tradition, in particular the system of Nagarjuna.

Most Tibetan sources state that the debate was decided in Kamalaśīla's favour (though many Chinese sources claim Moheyan won) and Moheyan was required to leave the country and that all sudden-enlightenment texts were gathered and destroyed by royal decree. This was a pivotal event in the history of Tibetan Buddhism, which would afterward continue to follow the late Indian model with only minor influence from China.

Nevertheless, Chan texts were produced until the 10th century in Tibet, which casts doubt on these Tibetan sources. One Chinese manuscript from Dunhuang (Pelliot chinois 4646) has the Tibetan emperor giving the teachings of Moheyan his seal of approval:

The Chan doctrine taught by Mahayana is a fully-justified development based on the text of the sutras; it is without error. From now on the monks and laity are permitted to practise and train in it under this edict.

== Teachings ==
=== Sudden teachings ===
Moheyan’s teachings were a mixture of the East Mountain Teachings (Note: Chinese: 東山法門 tung-shan fa-men; given the appellation of "Northern School" Chan by Shenhui (670-762)) associated with Yuquan Shenxiu and Baotang Chan. Broughton gives the following nomenclature:

Mo-ho-yen's teaching in Tibet as the famed proponent of the all-at-once gate can be summarized as "gazing-at-mind" (k'an-hsin... = sems la bltas (Note: IOL Tib J 468: (1v) //bsam gtan nyId du ‘jug pa’I tshe/ bdag gI sems la bltas na/ cI yang sems dpa’ myed de myI bsam mo/ rtog pa’I sems g.yos na tshor bar bya/ cI ltar tshor bar bya zhe na/ gang g.yos pa’I sems de nyId/ g.yos pa dang ma g.yos par yang myI brtag/ yod pa dang myed par yang (2r) myI brtag/ dge ba dang myI dge bar yang myI brtag/ nyong mongs pa dang rnam par byang bar yang myI brtag/ ste// chos thams cad cI lta bur yang myI brtag go// sems g.yos pa de lta bur tshor na rang bzhin myed pa yIn te/ /de nI chos lam spyod pa zhes bya’// (Note: Sam van Schaik (2008), Tibetan Chan II: the teachings of Heshang Moheyan (accessed: Saturday April 17, 2010))) and "no examining" (pu-kuan... = myi rtog pa) or "no-thought no-examining" (pu-ssu pu-kuan... = myi bsam myi rtog). "Gazing-at-mind" is an original Northern (or East Mountain Dharma Gate) teaching. As will become clear, Poa-t'ang and the Northern Ch'an dovetail in the Tibetan sources. Mo-ho-yen's teaching seems typical of late Northern Ch'an. Mo-ho-yen arrived on the central Tibetan scene somewhat late in comparison to the Ch'an transmissions from Szechwan.

The dichotomy of the gradual north and sudden south is a historical construction, as both Northern and Southern Schools contained "gradualist teachings" (Note: Chinese: chien-men) and "sudden teachings" (Note: Chinese: tun-men) and practices.

Master Moheyan’s Introduction to Instantaneous Meditation states:

This very mind that is without conceptualization is insubstantial, unarisen, unceasing, and identical with the space of reality. Since there is no need to fabricate it, do not chase after it or obstruct it. Instead, rest in primordial thusness without fabrication. How is this done? Since the mind is primordially nonabiding, it is unnecessary now to practice not abiding. Since the mind is primordially nonconceptual, it is unnecessary now to practice not conceptualizing. That would be to fabricate primordial thusness.

The Samten Migdrön gives the highest of Moheyan’s "five means" as follows:

Alert to what occurs in the mind of ignorance, one does not subsequently examine this alertness, nor does one abide in non-discursiveness. The mind is liberated and released as soon as it is produced.
Therefore, do not inhibit the notions [which arise in your mind]! Just as they occur, let them be as they are, primordially giving up all attempts at rectification: self-appeased, do not follow after them.

=== Liberation from vikalpa-citta ===
Gómez gives a detailed account of the doctrinal differences that were at stake at the "council of Lhasa", based on Buton Rinchen Drub's Chos-'yun, which in turn may have been based on Kamalaśīla's Third Bhāvanākrama. Buton Rinchen Drub had chosen two points to summarize the conflict, which entails complex doctrinal and historical issues.

Most of what is known of Moheyan’s teaching comes from fragments of writings in Chinese and Tibetan found in the Mogao Caves of Dunhuang (now in Gansu, China). The manuscript given the appellation IOL Tib J 709 is a collection of nine Chan texts, commencing with the teachings of Moheyan.

According to Buton Rinchen Drub, the conflict centered around two theses set out by Moheyan:

1. "As long as one carries out good or evil acts, one is not free from transmigration."
2. "Whoever does not think of anything, whoever does not reflect, will be totally free from transmigration. Not thinking, not pondering, non-examination, non-apprehension of an object - this is the immediate access [to liberation]."

yet, a principal point of Moheyan's teaching is that according to Moheyan, the root cause of samsara is the creation of false distinctions, vikalpa-citta. As long as these false distinctions are being created, one is bound to samsara.

==== Good and evil acts ====
According to Buton Rinchen Drub, Moheyan taught that carrying out good or evil acts binds one to transmigration. Moheyan's point is that the concept of good or false is itself still conceptual thinking, which obscures enlightenment. If all thought, good or bad, obscures enlightenment, then all actions must be based on the simplest principles of conduct. To achieve proper conduct, all conceptions, without exception should be seen as false:

If one sees conceptions as no conception, one sees the Tathāgata.

==== Not-thinking ====
Sam van Schaik notes that Moheyan "didn’t advocate the suppression of thoughts," but rather advised, in his own words:

[Y]ou should not suppress concepts. Whenever they arise, if you do not fabricate anything but instead let them go, then they will stay as they are and come to rest by themselves; thus you will not pursue them. (Note: Sam van schaik (2008), Tibetan Chan III: more teachings of Heshang Moheyan)

By practicing dhyana, awareness should be reverted toward this awareness itself:

To turn the light [of the mind] towards the mind’s source, that is contemplating the mind [...] one does not reflect on or observe whether thoughts are in movement or not, whether they are pure or not, whether they are empty or not.

By turning the attention inward, one discovers that no "self-nature" can be found in the movements of the mind. Eventually, dhyana leads to the realisation that awareness is empty, and cannot be grasped by concepts:

When he enters a state of deep contemplation, he looks into his own mind. There being no-mind, he does not engage in thought. If thoughts of discrimination arise, he should become aware of them [...] Whatever thoughts arise, one does not examine [...] He does not examine any dharma whatsoever. If he becomes aware in this way of the arising (of thoughts, he perceives) the absence of self-existence [...] After sitting (in this manner) for a long time, the mind will become tame, and one will realize that his awareness is also discriminating mind [...] Awareness itself is without name or form [...] [T]he awareness and place where it occurs cannot be obtained by any search. There is no way of reflecting on the inconceivable. Not to cling even to this absence of thought is (the immediate access of) the Tathagatas. (Note: Cited in Paul Williams (1994), Mahayana Buddhism, p.195-196)

=== Position regarding the six paramitas ===
According to Moheyan, while the paramitas may be necessary for beings who are unable to attain awakening suddenly, for beings of higher spiritual capacity one can neither speak of the necessity nor non-necessity of the paramitas. For beings who have attained no-thought, the paramitas arise without conscious effort, in a kind of "automatic practice." On the other hand, for beings yet to attain non-conceptuality, the paramitas should be practiced, yet "without expectation of reward." Moheyan also makes a distinction between external and internal paramitas. The external paramitas refer to upāya, external practices which benefit others; while the internal paramita refers to prajñā, the non-conceptual wisdom by which one liberates oneself.

== Influence ==
The teachings of Moheyan and other Chan masters were unified with the Kham Dzogchen ("Great Perfection") lineages (Note: This may or may not be congruent with the Kahma (Tibetan: bka' ma) lineages) through the Kunkhyen (Tibetan for "omniscient"), Rongzom Chokyi Zangpo. The Dzogchen of the Nyingma was often identified with the subitist ("sudden enlightenment") (Note: Tibetan: cig car gyi ‘jug pa) of Moheyan, and was called to defend itself against this charge by avowed members of the Sarma lineages that held to the staunch view of "gradual enlightenment" (Note: Tibetan: rim gyis ‘jug pa)

== Iconography ==
According to Ying Chua, Moheyan is often iconographically depicted holding a conch shell (Skt. shankha) and prayer beads (Skt. mala):

He is usually depicted as a rotund and jovial figure and holding a mala, or prayer beads in his left hand and a sankha, conch shell in his right. He is often considered a benefactor of children and is usually depicted with at least one or more playing children around him.

An iconographic thangka depiction of Moheyan is held in the Southern Alleghenies Museum of Art (SAMA) collection, St. Francis College, Loretto, Pennsylvania. (Note: Kaladarshan Arts)

== See also ==
- Chöd

== Sources ==
=== Printed sources ===
- Barber, A. W. (1990), "The Unifying of Rdzogs Pa Chen Po and Ch'an", Chung-Hwa Buddhist Journal, 3
- Broughton, Jeffrey (1983), "Early Ch'an Schools in Tibet", in Gimello, Robert M.; Gregory, Peter N. (eds.), Studies in Ch'an and Hua-yen, University of Hawaii Press, ISBN 0-8248-0835-5
- Gómez, Luis O (1983), "The Direct and the Gradual Approaches of Zen Master Mahayana: Fragments of the Teachings of Mo-ho-yen in Studies in Ch'an and Hua-yen", in Gimello, Robert M.; Gregory, Peter N. (eds.), Studies in Ch'an and Hua-yen, University of Hawaii Press, ISBN 0-8248-0835-5
- Hanson-Barber, A.W. (1985), "'No-Thought' in Pao-T'ang Ch'an and Early Ati-Yoga", Journal of the International Association of Buddhist Studies, 8 (2): 61–73
- Powers, John (2004), History as Propaganda: Tibetan Exiles versus the People's Republic of China, Oxford University Press, ISBN 978-0-19-517426-7
- Ray, Gary L. (2005), The Northern Ch'an School and Sudden Versus Gradual Enlightenment Debates in China and Tibet
- Schaik, Sam van (2007), The Great Perfection and the Chinese Monk: rNyingmapa defences of Hwashang Mahāyāna in the Eighteenth Century, archived from the original on August 29, 2007
- Schrempf, Mona (2006), "Hwa shang at the Border: Transformations of History and Reconstructions of Identity in Modern A mdo", JIATS, 2: 1–32
- Yamaguchi, Zuihō (1997), "The Core Elements of Indian Buddhism Introduced into Tibet", in Hubbard, Jamie; Swanson, Paul L. (eds.), Pruning the Bodhi Tree: The Storm over Critical Buddhism, Honolulu: University of Hawai’i Press, ISBN 978-0-8248-1949-1
