= Kamalaśīla =

Indian Buddhist missionary (c.740-795)

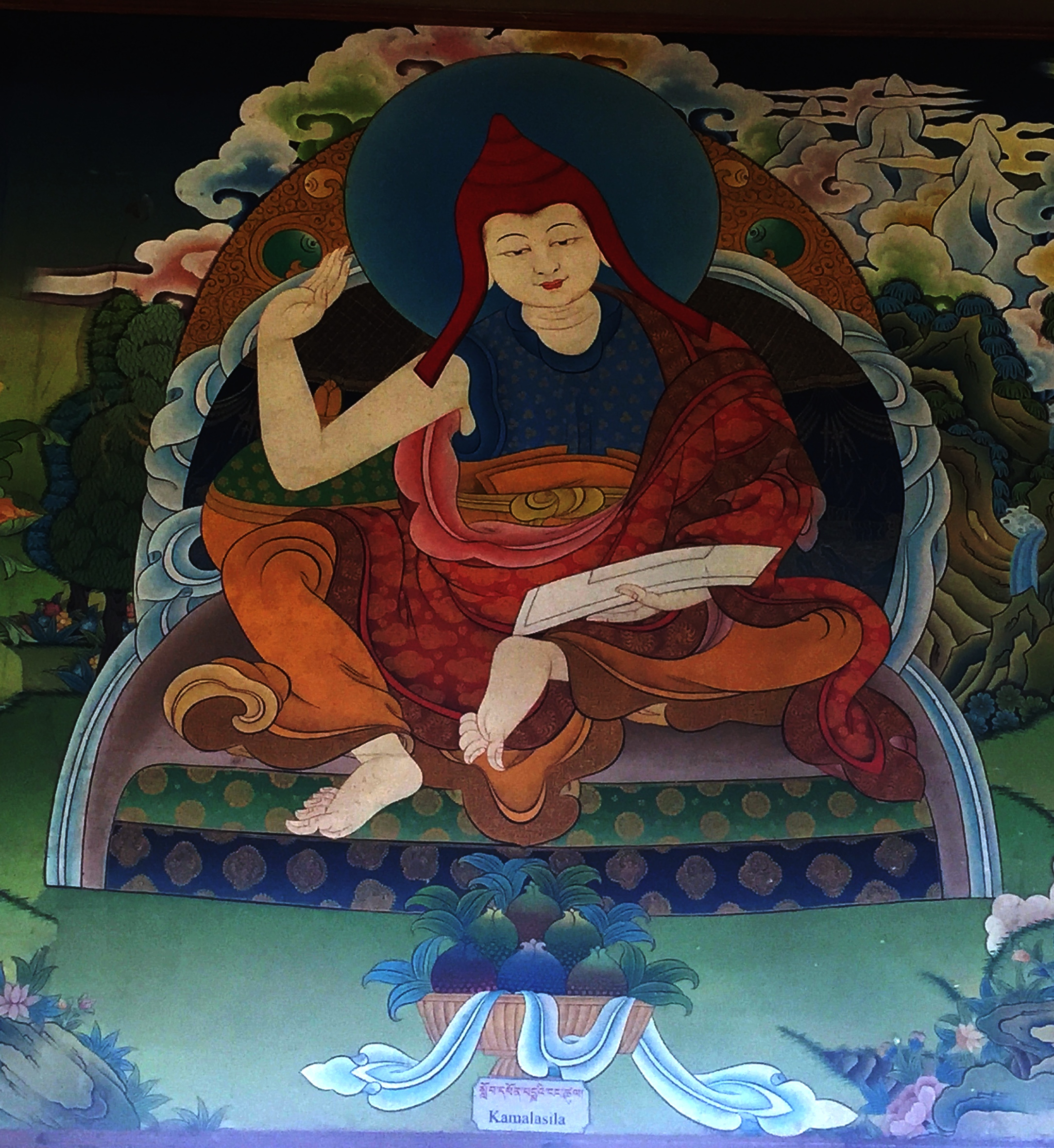
- Tibetan mural of Kamalaśīla

Personal life
- Born: c. 740 CE
- Died: c. 795 CE Tibet
- Education: Nalanda

Religious life
- Religion: Buddhism
- School: Madhyamaka

Senior posting
- Teacher: Śāntarakṣita

Kamalaśīla (Skt. Kamalaśīla; Tib. པདྨའི་ངང་ཚུལ་, Pemé Ngang Tsul; Wyl. pad+ma'i ngang tshul) (c. 740–795) was an Indian Buddhist monk and philosopher of Nalanda Mahavihara. He accompanied Śāntarakṣita (725–788) to Tibet at the request of Trisong Detsen.

Kamalaśīla was a pivotal figure in the development of Indian Mahayana thought and made a number of original contributions in this field that demonstrated his knowledge of both Buddhist and non-Buddhist philosophies. In addition to this, his role as a missionary for Indian Buddhism and his supposed victory in the Debate of Samye helped shape the formation of Tibetan Buddhism. His works spanned several genres and touched upon different schools of Buddhism including Madhyamaka as well as the traditions espoused by Dignāga and Dharmakirti.

== Biography ==
Much of what we know of Kamalaśīla's life comes from later Tibetan sources which are comparatively late and therefore problematic. Tibetan sources refer to him, Santaraksita and Jñānagarbha as rang rgyud shar gsum meaning the "three eastern Svātantrikas" indicating their origins from Eastern India. Little else is provided as to his life prior to travelling to Tibet aside from that he studied under Santaraksita in Nalanda and arrived in Tibet at the invitations of King Trisong Detsen after 788 CE after his teachers death.

=== Debate of Samye ===
In 793 Trisong Detsen resolved that Moheyan did not hold the true dharma. Following intense protests from Moheyan's supporters, Trisong Detsen proposed to settle the matter by sponsoring a debate, the "Council of Lhasa", although it may actually have taken place at Samye, a considerable distance from Lhasa. Kamalaśila was invited to represent Vajrayana while Moheyan represented the East Mountain Teaching of Chan Buddhism. Most Tibetan sources state that the debate was decided in Kamalaśīla's favour (though many Chinese sources claim Moheyan won) and Moheyan was required to leave the country and that all sudden-enlightenment texts were gathered and destroyed by royal decree. This was a pivotal event in the history of Tibetan Buddhism, which would afterwards continue to follow the late Indian model with only minor influence from China. Moheyan's teachings were a mixture of the East Mountain Teachings (Note: Chinese: 東山法門 tung-shan fa-men; given the appellation of "Northern School" Chan by Shenhui (670–762)) associated with Yuquan Shenxiu and with the teachings of Baotang Wuzhu.

It is said that following his victory, Kamalasila was murdered by three butchers who killed him by squeezing his kidneys. Sources disagree as to whether the killers were assassins hired by Moheyan or non-Buddhists who were against the rise of Buddhism in Tibet.

=== The Cham dance ===
There is a Cham dance that retells the story of the Council of Lhasa related to the teachings of Chöd. Moheyan is generally depicted as of ample girth, goaded by children. Chöd is a product of both the Indian and Chinese transmissions of Buddhism into the Himalayas. For a discussion of the Dunhuang fulcrum of the entwined relationship of Chinese and Indian Buddhism see van Schaik and Dalton (2004).

For simplicity, the Vajrayana transmission may be characterised as "gradual" (Wylie: rim gyis 'jug pa; Chinese: dunwu) and the Chan as "direct" (Wylie: cig car gyi 'jug pa; Chinese: jianwu). It needs to be emphasised that this neat dichotomy in characterisation of these two approaches is only valid for the historical context of the great debate between Kamalaśīla and Moheyan and even then it is still open to dialectic.

According to the lore of the orthodox, prevailing Tibetan cultural tradition, Kamalaśīla, a scholar educated at Nalanda, advocated the "gradual" process to enlightenment; whereas, Moheyan, as a trance and meditation master, advocated the "direct" awakening of original mind through the nirodha of discursive thought, the cessation of the mind of ideation. The historicity of this debate has been drawn into question by Tucci & Heissig (1970), Gomez (1983) and Ruegg (1992) though this does not lessen its importance in defining the religious and cultural traditions of Tibet. Kamalaśīla was very handsome and a great orator and historically "won" the debate: though there are conflicting primary sources and secondary accounts.

One hagiography asserts that directly after this debate with Moheyan, as Kamalaśīla was making his way down from the Himalayas to the Indian lowlands, he was incited to enact phowa through compassionate duress, transferring his mindstream to animate a corpse polluted with a dangerous infection and thereby safely moving the hazard it presented to a nearby community. As the mindstream of Kamalaśīla was otherwise engaged, a mahasiddha by the name of Dampa Sangye came across the vacant body of Kamalaśīla. Padampa Sangye was not karmically blessed with an aesthetic corporeal form, and upon finding the very handsome and healthy empty body of Kamalaśīla, which he perceived as a newly dead fresh corpse, transferred his mindstream into Kamalaśīla's body. Padampa Sangye's mindstream in Kamalaśīla's body continued the ascent to the Himalaya and thereby transmitted the Chöd.

The mindstream of Kamalaśīla, upon endeavouring to return to his body, was unable to do so and resorted by necessity to the vacant body of Padampa Sangye. The mindstream of Padampa Sangye continued in this body, and it is in this handsome body that the transmission of Chöd was made to Machig Labdrön, his consort.

== Lineage ==
Dargyay, et al. (1977, 1998: p. 7) convey a lineage of transmission and translation of Śīla, Sutrayana Buddhavacana and the Six Pāramitā (viewed principally through the Mahayana teachings of Nagarjuna), from India to Tibet (pandit in this context denotes a Sanskrit scholar):

The Indian pandits, represented mainly by Śāntarakṣita, Kamalaśīla, and his disciple Ye-śes-dbang-po, form a known group. These scholars were all defenders of the Madhyamaka school, which is based upon Nāgārjuna's teachings. First of all, however, they taught the ten rules of behaviour of the Buddhist ethics (śīla) and a summary of the teachings according to the canonic Sūtras of the Mahāyāna, as well as the virtuous works of the six pāramitās. These exercises are supposed to lead, in a long seemingly endless way, to the gradual ascent to the acquisition of higher intellectual abilities finally culminating in Buddhahood. This trend was intensified after the debate of bSam-yas had taken place in the years 792 to 794; the exact outcome of this debate is still debatable.

== Works ==
=== Trilogy of Stages of Meditation (bhāvanākrama) ===
Kamalaśīla is renowned for writing three texts, all called Bhāvanākrama (Stages of Meditation), which summarize and build upon aspects of the Yogacara tradition of Asanga, particularly as pertaining to aspects of meditation practice and mental cultivation (bhavana). The first volume was translated into Classic Chinese. Though they had different purposes, Kamalaśīla’s three Bhāvanākramas can be regarded as counterparts of Wang Xi’s Dunwu Dasheng zhengli jue reflecting one of the protagonists’ arguments and strategy during the controversy. The Bhāvanākramas can be regarded as one of his best studied works. All three Bhāvanākramas have been preserved in the Madhyamaka section of the Tengyur and translated into English; the Sanskrit and the Tibetan versions of the first Bhāvanākrama have been edited and translated by Giuseppe Tucci; the Tibetan text of the second Bhāvanākrama has been edited by Goshima in 1983; the third Bhāvanākrama has been translated by Étienne Lamotte.

The three Bhāvanākramas are Kamalaśīla’s most influential works on meditation and there associated practices. All three of the texts overlap with each other and all of them rely on a combination of rational analysis and scriptural citation to establish his understanding of the path of spiritual advancement. Various religious texts are cited in the three Bhāvanākramas including the Sandhinirmocana, Ratnamegha Sutra, Samadhiraja Sutra, Laṅkāvatāra Sūtra and the Ratnakūṭa sūtras.

=== Commentary on Madhyamālaṃkāra ===
(Sanskrit: Madhyamālaṃkāra-panjika, Wylie: dbu ma rgyan gyi dka' 'grel)
Commentary on Difficult Points (Sanskrit: Madhyamālaṃkāra-panjika, Wylie: dbu ma rgyan gyi dka' 'grel) by Kamalaśīla

=== Location ===
There is an ongoing debate about whether Kamalaśīla composed his works in India or Tibet. Tibetan sources including the Testimony of Ba hold that Kamalaśīla composed the Madhyamakāloka and the first two Bhāvanākramas in Tibet at the request of Emperor Trisong Detsen and that he personally presented the completed works to him which greatly pleased him. The scholar, Birgit Kellner, believes these claims deserve to be taken seriously, but not literally. The Madhyamakāloka for example does not receive any reception in India itself until the 12th century in the Munimatālaṅkāra by Abhayakaragupta. The biography of Atiśa also indicates that he was the first Indian master to discover the work while in Tibet and he subsequently sent a copy back with himself to India.

== See also ==
- Nagarjuna
- Bhāvanākrama

== Bibliography ==
- Kamalaśīla; Kiyotaka Goshima (1983). The Tibetan Text of the Second Bhāvanākrama. Goshima Kiyotaka.
- Kamalaśīla (1997). Bhāvanākramaḥ: Tibetan version, Sanskrit restoration and Hindi translation. Central Inst. of Higher Tibetan studies.
- Kamalaśīla (1997). Bhāvanākrama of Kamalaśila: Transl. Into English by Parmananda Sharma. Aditya Prakashan. ISBN 978-81-86471-15-9.
- Kamalaśīla (1998). The Stages of Meditation: Bhāvanākrama II. Middle volume. Translated by Geshe Lhundup Sopa; Elvin W. Jones; John Newman. Deer Park Books.
- Shūki Yoshimura (1953). Tibetan Buddhistology: Introductory notes: Bhāvanākrama. Research Society for the Eastern Sacred Books, Ryukoku University.
- Kamalaśīla (2007). Kamalashila: The Stages of Meditation, Bhavanakrama II (online text). Dharma Teachings Project.

== Sources ==
- Hanson-Barber, A. W. (1985), "'No-Thought' in Pao-T'ang Ch'an and Early Ati-Yoga", Journal of the International Association of Buddhist Studies, 8 (2): 61–73
- Tucci, G. and Heissig, W. (1970). Die Religionen Tibets und der Mongolei. Stuttgart.
- Yamaguchi, Zuihō (1997), The Core Elements of Indian Buddhism Introduced into Tibet'. In: Jamie Hubbard and Paul L. Swanson (ed.), Pruning the Bodhi Tree: The Storm over Critical Buddhism, Honolulu: University of Hawai'i Press, ISBN 978-0-8248-1949-1
