= Baotang Wuzhu =

Buddhist monk

Baotang Wuzhu (traditional Chinese: 保唐無住, 714–774 CE), also rendered in the Wade–Giles romanization as Pao-t'ang Wu-chu, was the head and founder of the Baotang School of Chan Buddhism (Chinese: 保唐宗) in Chengdu, Sichuan, southwest China. The Baotang School was known for its radical rejection of rituals and formal Buddhist practices.

== Biography ==
Wuzhu was born in what is now Shaanxi Province. His father had served in the army during the early years of the reign of Emperor Xuanzong of Tang. Wuzhu, also known for his strength and martial abilities, served for a yamen, a local administrative headquarters, as Patrolling Grand Lance Officer before beginning his study of Buddhism under the enlightened layman Chen Chuzang. Chen Chuzang's origins are unknown, but he was regarded as an incarnation of Vimalakīrti. After receiving transmission from Chuzang, Wuzhu continued to practice as a layman for some time. Later he was persuaded by Chan Master Zizai, a dharma heir of Huineng, to renounce lay life. Wuzhu took full monk's vows in 749, at age thirty-five. After this, Wuzhu spent some time travelling to various locations, such as Mount Wutai, where he heard the teaching of Shenhui, as well as to different monasteries in the capital Chang'an. Broughton points out that Wuzhu did not study under Shenhui directly, but rather heard lectures on his sayings. Since Wuzhu understood their meaning, he did not go on to visit Shenhui or pay him obeisance.

In 751, Wuzhu travelled to the Helan mountains on the border of now-Inner Mongolia, where he met a merchant named Cao Gui. Cao Gui told Wuzhu that his physical resemblance to the Korean master, Wuxiang, was so uncanny that he must be a transformation-body (huashen). Cao Gui shared some of Wuxiang's teachings with Wuzhu which he claimed not to understand, but which Wuzhu grasped instantly. Wuzhu now felt a mysterious affinity which prompted him to travel to see Wuxiang in Sichuan.

Wuzhu arrived at Wuxiang's Jingzhong monastery in 759 at the beginning of a bodhisattva-precepts retreat, when Wuxiang invited him to stay at the monastery. Wuzhu attends the retreat for three days. During his public lectures at the retreat, Wuxiang would cryptically intone a message that was meant for Wuzhu alone: "Why do you not go into the mountains, what good is it to linger?" Thus, Wuzhu left the monastery to enter the mountains.

Although Wuzhu does not meet Wuxiang again, the Lidai fabao ji depicts him as being intimately aware of events at Wuxiang's distant Jingzhong monastery. From his far away mountaintop, Wuzhu says he and Wuxiang see each other constantly as though they were face-to-face. Wendi Adamek maintains that the "long distance relationship" between Wuzhu and Wuxiang is a device intended to explain away the fact that Wuzhu was never really a disciple of Wuxiang. She points out that the two met face-to-face only once. Similarly, Broughton points out that Wuzhu and Wuxiang had a merely tangential connection.

When Wuxiang is about to die, he sends a messenger carrying Bodhidharma's robe to give to Wuzhu, thus giving Wuzhu dharma transmission from afar. According to the Lidai fabao ji, Huineng had given Bodhidharma's robe to Empress Wu Zetian, who then passed it to Chan master Zhishen, grandfather-in-dharma to Wuxiang, whom the Lidai fabao ji depicts as the robe's rightful possessor.

There is also a second version of indirect transmission from Wuxiang in the Lidai fabao ji. In this alternate version, Wuzhu sends a lay disciple named Dong Xuan to Wuxiang to receive the bodhisattva precepts, bearing a gift of tea. When Dong Xuan presents Wuxiang with the tea, he lies, telling Wuxiang he is a personal disciple of Wuzhu. Just as Dong Xuan is about to leave, he receives a private audience with Wuxiang in which he is entrusted with Bodhidharma's robe and a statement of secret transmission naming Wuzhu as the recipient of the robe.

== Teachings ==
Sources for Wuzhu's teachings include the Lidai fabao ji, the main text of his Baotang School; as well as Zongmi's accounts and critiques of various Tang era schools of Chan in his writings.

=== Antiformalism ===
According to Wendi Adamek, Wuzhu held that one should not be attached to traditional devotional rituals, including, among other things, bodhisattva vows, visualization techniques, and merit-making. Wuzhu's Baotang School was criticized by Zongmi for its radical rejection of some of the more formal aspects of Buddhist practice, such as taking precepts, performing repentance rituals, reading sutras, and keeping buddha images. This stance is corroborated by the Jingzhong Chan figure, Hui-i Shen-ch'ing, whose criticism of the Baotang also noted their lack of ritual and imagery. Wuzhu rejected the traditional Buddhist practices of chanting and worship, preferring instead a practice of "sitting in idleness" (kongxian zuo). Antiformalism in Wuzhu's Baotang School extended to denial of customary etiquette as well, as demonstrated by their refusal to stand up to greet or welcome visitors, regardless of their status. (Note: Yuanwu Keqin recounts the following story of Nanyue Mingzan 南嶽明瓚, a disciple of the Northern School master Puji 普寂 (651–739). Mingzan, also known as Lanzan 懶贊 ("Lazy Zan"), similarly refused to stand for a messenger sent by the emperor: "Lanzan lived in seclusion in a stone cave on Mount Heng 衡 [i.e., Nanyue]. Emperor Dezong 德宗 [r. 779–805] heard his name and dispatched a messenger to summon him to the court. When the messenger reached the cave he announced the command of the Son of Heaven, then said, “Your Reverence should rise and acknowledge the Imperial Benevolence.” Zan, who at the time was poking a fire of cow-dung, pulled out a roasted root and began to eat. As it was wintertime, mucous was dripping down onto his chin, and he made no answer. The messenger laughed and said, “May I suggest that Your Reverence wipe the mucous away?” “Why should I go to that bother for a common man?” Zan replied. In the end he did not rise. The messenger returned and reported to the throne. Dezong was filled with admiration.") Wuzhu criticized Vinaya masters who maintained forms of decorum for every occasion, saying:

These days Vinaya Masters preach about [sense] ‘contact’ and preach about ‘purity,’ preach about ‘upholding’ and preach about ‘violating.’ They make forms for receiving the precepts, they make forms for decorum, and even for eating food—everything is made into forms. ‘If one makes forms, then one is the same as non-Buddhist [practitioners of] the five supramundane powers. If one does not make forms, this is precisely the unconditioned. One ought not have views.’

According to Yanagida, the Lidai fabao ji of Wuzhu's Baotang School considers itself as inheriting the spirit of Shenhui's attacks on the gradualistic practices of the Northern School. But while influenced by the teachings of Shenhui, it is also concerned to establish a more radical position. For instance, while Wuzhu adopts Shenhui's teaching of wunian ("no-thought"), which was central to Shenhui's critique of Northern Chan, Wuzhu applies its implications to traditional Buddhist practices as well. For Wuzhu's radical approach to wunian rejects all Buddhist ritual and places no formal restraints on religious life. As an example of his radical application of this doctrine, when Wuzhu accepted new members to the Buddhist order, he refused to perform the traditional ceremony of conferring the Buddhist precepts.

According to Adamek, such antiformalism was not a kind of laissez-faire spontaneity, and was more similar to Zongmi's "sudden awakening-gradual cultivation" model of practice than he was willing to credit. That is, according to Adamek, Baotang antiformalism itself functioned as a type of gradual cultivation. Adamek points out that Wuzhu's practice of sitting in idleness was not spontaneity, but rather "forgetting to eat and shit and piss." Furthermore, Zongmi observes that, "in their [the Baotang School's] dwellings they do not discuss clothing and food, but give free rein to people's sending of offerings. If sent, then they have warm clothing and enough to eat. If not sent, then they give free rein to hunger and give free rein to cold." As Adamek puts it, "Bao Tang inversion of institutional norms did not promote carefree spontaneity or a free lunch. It necessitated the hard, gradual training of relinquishing expectations moment by moment, becoming indifferent to the fluctuations of abundance and privation."

=== Key features of practice ===
According to Adamek, Wuzhu's signature teaching was no-thought (wunian), which was a kind of practice of no-practice. For example, Wuzhu said, "No-thought is thus no-practice, no-thought is thus no-contemplation. No-thought is thus no-body, no-thought is thus no-mind. No-thought is thus no-nobility, no-thought is thus no-lowliness. No-thought is thus no-high, no-thought is thus no-low. At the time of true no-thought, no-thought itself is not." (Note: Wuzhu also said: "If there is mind, it is like waves on the water. If there is no-mind, it is like the heretics. To follow after arising is the defilement of sentient-beings. To depend upon quiescence is movement in nirvāṇa. Do not follow after arising nor depend upon quiescence; do not enter concentration; have no arising; do not enter ch'an; have no practice. The mind has neither obtaining nor losing; there are neither reflections nor forms; one dwells in neither nature nor marks.")

Wuzhu also taught:

‘The Most Honored Greatly Enlightened One expounded the Dharma of producing no-thought. [Regarding] the mind of no-thought and non-production, the mind is constantly producing and never extinguished.’ At all times self-present, do not retreat and do not turn. Not sinking and not floating, not flowing and not fixed, not moving and not shaking, not coming and not going, lively like a fish jumping! Walking and sitting, everything is meditation.

According to Adamek, the Lidai Fabao ji is the first Chan text to use the term huopopo 活鱍鱍 ("lively like a fish jumping"), a term that also occurs in later Chan texts, such as the Linji lu. For Yanagida, this term best captures the flavor of Wuzhu's Chan. It was originally a colloquial phrase pointing to a spirited and vigorous way of being. Yanagida states that when later taken up by Linji, it points to man's original freedom, the fact that he is "vividly, irresistibly alive," thus expressing "the basic activity of man's life, an 'aliveness' which cannot be contained, dispersed or in any way controlled." The Neo-Confucian Ch'eng-tzu also used the term to refer to the Dao which is ever active, pervading heaven and earth. In connection with huopopo, Wuzhu relates a parable of a man standing atop a mound. When some passersby cannot decide what he is doing, the man says to them, "I'm just standing." Wuzhu then comments, "My Ch'an neither sinks nor floats, neither flows nor congeals; yet it truly works. It works, free from birth and death, free from purity and defilement, free from right and wrong; vividly alive (huo-p'o-p'o), it is Ch'an in every single moment."

Another important teaching found in the Lidai fabao ji is its "three phrases," which Wuzhu attributed to Wuxiang, from whom he claimed transmission: no-recollection (wuyi 無憶), no-thought (wunian 無念), and do not be deluded (mowang 莫妄). Wuzhu associates these three phrases with the traditional three trainings of Buddhism. He says, "They are one, not three. No-recollection is śila, no-thought is samādhi, and ‘do not be deluded’ is prajñā." However, there seems to have been some controversy regarding the original wording of the three phrases. Adamek points out, following Zongmi, that Wuxiang's original three phrases were slightly different from Wuzhu's version. Instead of "do not be deluded" (mowang 莫妄) for the final phrase, Wuxiang apparently taught the homophone mowang (莫忘), "do not forget." As for the stance of Wuzhu's Baotang school, Zongmi observes, "The idea is that, since no-remembering and no-thought are the real and remembering-thoughts is the false, then remembering-thoughts is not allowed. Therefore, they say no-falseness [rather than no-forgetting]." Regarding no-recollection, Wuzhu taught that one must neither recollect ordinary, worldly dharmas, nor even the Buddha Dharma itself. He says:

[As for] not-recollecting and not-thinking, [this means] not-recollecting any Dharma at all, not-recollecting either the Buddha-Dharma or worldly dharmas, so much at ease. (Note: One also finds reference to a state free of recollection in the famous Xinxin Ming (Faith-Mind Inscription), traditionally attributed to the third Chan patriarch Sengcan though likely a product of the Oxhead School: "Nothing remains Nothing is harboured in memory [無可記憶] Void, clear, self-illumining The heart-strength does not struggle It is not the place of calculated thinking Difficult for understanding and sentiment to fathom In the Dharma realm of true Suchness There is no other, no self" See also the words of Chengguan: "In the case where cultivation and enlightenment are simultaneous, when no-mind is shining in forgetfulness, it is naturally tranquil and aware. This is a case of samādhi and prajñā operating concurrently. No-mind, like a luminous mirror, suddenly reflects all things.")

== See also ==
- Trisong Detsen (755–797 or 804 CE)
- Shenxiu (Chinese: 神秀; c.606–706)
