= February 1904 =

Month of 1904

<<	February 1904					>>
Su	Mo	Tu	We	Th	Fr	Sa
	1	2	3	4	5	6
7	8	9	10	11	12	13
14	15	16	17	18	19	20
21	22	23	24	25	26	27
28	29

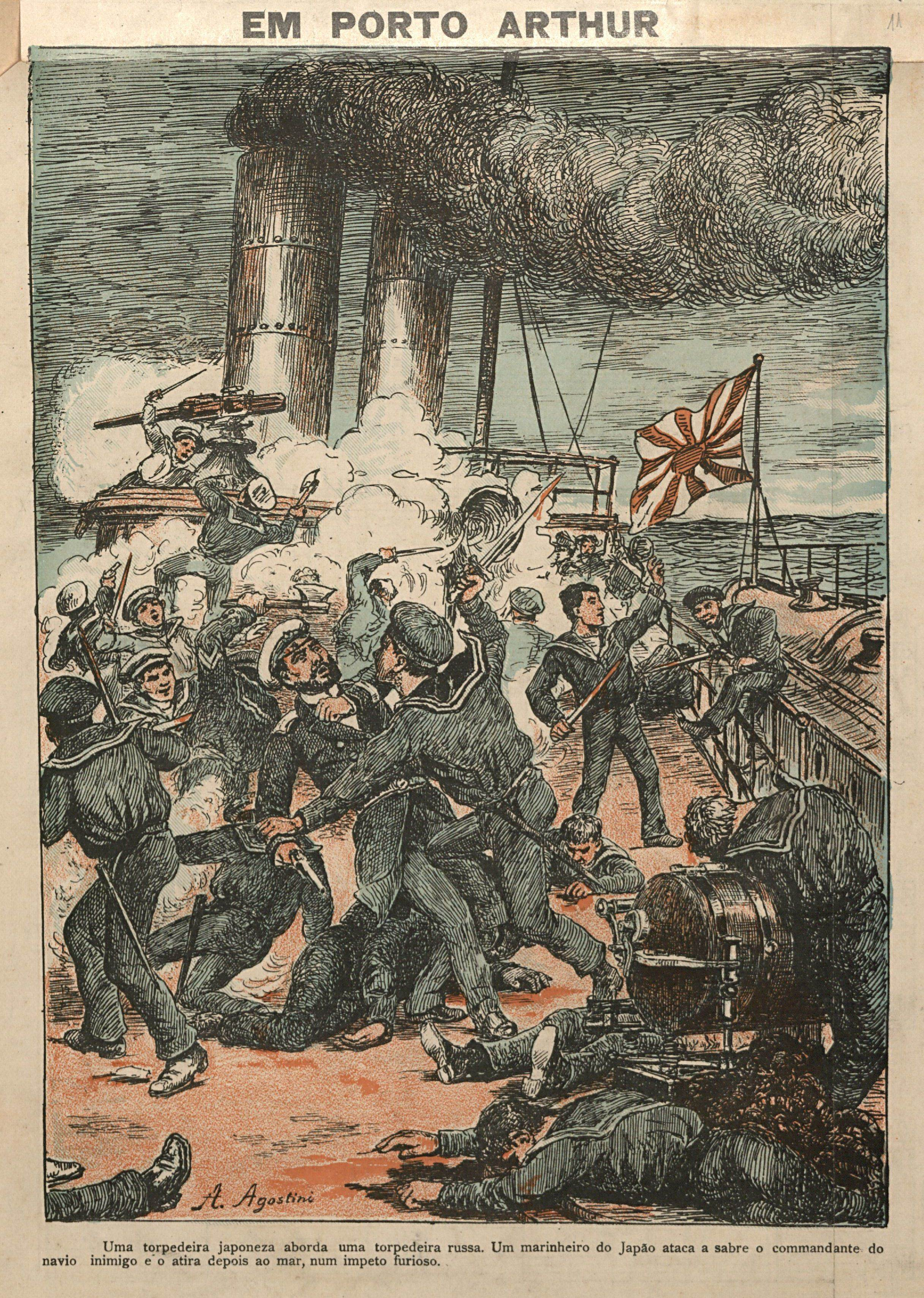
February 8–9, 1904: Outbreak of the Russo-Japanese War

The following events occurred in February 1904:

== February 1, 1904 (Monday) ==
- Frank Wedekind's play Pandora's Box, the second part of his "Lulu" cycle, received its world premiere in Nuremberg, Germany.
- Opera singer Lillian Nordica was granted an interlocutory decree of divorce from her husband, operatic tenor Zoltán Döhme.
- At the White House in Washington, D.C., U.S. President Theodore Roosevelt met for about 10 minutes with renowned American frontier lawman and sportswriter Bat Masterson while senators and representatives waited in an adjoining room.
- In a bout at the West End club in St. Louis, Missouri, American boxer Abe Attell defeated American Harry Forbes by knockout to win the world featherweight championship.
- Born:
  - Tricky Sam Nanton (born Joseph Nanton Irish), American trombonist; in New York City (d. 1946, stroke)
  - Pierre Naville, French Surrealist writer and sociologist; in Paris, France (d. 1993)
  - S. J. Perelman, American humorist and author; in Brooklyn, New York City (d. 1979)
  - Joseph Asajiro Satowaki, Japanese Roman Catholic cardinal, Archbishop of Nagasaki; in Shittsu, Kyushu, Japan (d. 1996, brain tumor)
- Died:
  - Curtis Coe Bean, 76, American businessman and politician, Congressional delegate from Arizona Territory
  - Mariano S. Otero, 59, Congressional delegate from the Territory of New Mexico, died of apoplexy.
  - Peter Paul Maria Alberdingk Thijm, 76, Dutch academic and writer

== February 2, 1904 (Tuesday) ==
- Pope Pius X issued the encyclical Ad diem illum, commemorating the 50th anniversary of Pope Pius IX's definition of the dogma of the Immaculate Conception of the Virgin Mary.
- In Council Bluffs, Iowa, the home of the Christiensen family was destroyed by fire at 2 am, killing 5 children 11 years old and younger and critically burning their mother.
- The Kentucky House of Representatives indefinitely postponed consideration of a bill to disenfranchise African American voters, effectively killing the measure.
- A major fire in the wholesale district of Knoxville, Tennessee, killed fire captain William A. Maxey and John J. Dunn, a former fireman who was helping fight the blaze. The walls of a neighboring building collapsed and fell through the roof of the building where Maxey and Dunn were.
- Born:
  - Bozorg Alavi (born Seyyed Mojtaba Alavi), Iranian writer, novelist and intellectual; in Tehran, Iran (d. 1997)
  - Peter Blos, German American psychoanalyst; in Karlsruhe, Germany (d. 1997)
  - Sonora Webster Carver (born Sonora Webster), American horse diver; in Waycross, Georgia (d. 2003)
  - Valery Chkalov, Soviet test pilot; in Vasilyevo, Russian Empire (d. 1938, plane crash)
  - Helen Rose, American costume designer; in Chicago, Illinois (d. 1985)
  - Andreina Sacco, Italian athletics competitor; in Turin, Italy (d. 1988)
- Died:
  - Sir Edward Braddon KCMG PC, 74, Cornish-born Australian politician, Premier of Tasmania
  - Ernest Cashel, 21–22, American-Canadian criminal, was executed by hanging.
  - Frederick Mills, 54, English rugby union player
  - William Collins Whitney, 62, American politician, United States Secretary of the Navy, died of sepsis while under anesthesia prior to an operation for appendicitis.
  - W. W. Woolnough, 81, American newspaperman, abolitionist and politician

== February 3, 1904 (Wednesday) ==
- In Vienna, Austria, the secessionist artists decided not to exhibit at the upcoming Louisiana Purchase Exposition in St. Louis, Missouri.
- An intercolonial express train on its way from Halifax, Nova Scotia to Montreal and Boston derailed near Hunter's Crossing, 5 miles (8.0 km) west of Halifax, and fell into the Shuberdarie River, killing 2 people and seriously injuring 27.
- In Lexington, Kentucky, Nora Veal shot herself to death after viewing the body of her fiancé, Ellis Kinkeaid, who had taken his own life on February 1 because Veal had gone to the theater with another man.
- At a plantation in Doddsville, Mississippi, belonging to white planter James Eastland, Luther Holbert, an African American, allegedly shot and killed John Carr, also African American, and mortally wounded Eastland. Eastland, returning fire, shot and killed John Winters, an African American. When a posse arrived at the plantation another African American was shot and killed. Posses began searching for Holbert and his wife.
- Born:
  - Luigi Dallapiccola, Italian composer; in Pisino d'Istria, Austria-Hungary (d. 1975, pulmonary edema)
  - Pretty Boy Floyd (born Charles Arthur Floyd), American gangster; in Adairsville, Georgia (d. 1934, shot by law enforcement)
  - Aleksandr Kharkevich, Soviet academician, acoustician and cyberneticist; in Saint Petersburg, Russian Empire (d. 1965)
  - Mireille Perrey, French actress; in Bordeaux, Gironde, France (d. 1991)
  - Roger Makins, 1st Baron Sherfield, British diplomat, Ambassador to the United States of America (d. 1996)
- Died:
  - Marie Firmin Bocourt, 84, French zoologist and artist
  - Robert Ellin, 66, English-born American stone and wood sculptor, died of heart failure.
  - William McCleave, 78–79, Irish-born Union Army officer
  - John James McDannold, 52, U.S. Representative from Illinois
  - Benjamin Pickard, 61, British coal miner, trade unionist and politician, died of heart disease.
  - Newton Talbot, 88, American publisher, politician and college administrator
  - Robert Young, 69, Canadian businessman and politician, died of heart disease.

== February 4, 1904 (Thursday) ==
- The last American troops left Cuba, ending the U.S. occupation of the island. Tomás Estrada Palma, the President of Cuba, and Herbert G. Squiers, the U.S. Minister to Cuba, attended a ceremony at which the flag of the United States was lowered and the flag of Cuba was raised.
- A bill was introduced in the Maryland Senate to disenfranchise African American voters.
- Lake Village, Arkansas, was almost completely destroyed by fire. Property losses were estimated at $250,000.
- The town hall of Stamford, Connecticut, was destroyed by fire, with estimated losses of $180,000.
- Born:
  - Chaudhry Ghulam Abbas, Jammu and Kashmir lawyer and politician; in Jammu (d. 1967, stomach cancer)
  - Deng Yingchao, Chairwoman of the Chinese People's Political Consultative Conference, wife of Zhou Enlai; in Nanning, Guangxi, Qing Empire (d. 1992)
  - MacKinlay Kantor (born Benjamin McKinlay Kantor), American writer and historian; in Webster City, Iowa (d. 1977)
  - Predrag Milošević, Serbian composer and conductor; in Knjaževac, Kingdom of Serbia (d. 1988)
  - Teo Otto, Swiss scenographer; in Remscheid, Germany (d. 1968)
  - Georges Sadoul, French journalist and cinema writer; in Nancy, Meurthe-et-Moselle, France (d. 1967)
  - Zachari Zachariev (a.k.a. Volkan Goranov), Bulgarian military pilot and commander (Red Army and Bulgarian Air Force); in Basarbovo, Kingdom of Bulgaria (d. 1987)
- Died:
  - William D. Bishop, 76, American politician and railroad executive, member of the United States House of Representatives from Connecticut, died of chronic endocarditis.
  - Walter Hill, 84, Scottish Australian botanist, first curator of the Brisbane Botanic Gardens

== February 5, 1904 (Friday) ==
- The National Republican Editorial association endorsed Theodore Roosevelt in the 1904 United States presidential election. Meeting with the association's delegates in Washington, D.C., Roosevelt said, "In the proper sense of the term, no man is more essentially a public servant than the editor—the man who in the public press not merely gives the news, but exercises so great a control over the thought of our country."
- Born:
  - Walter Gross, German actor; in Eberswalde, Germany (d. 1989, heart failure)
  - Frederick Gordon-Lennox, 9th Duke of Richmond, British peer, engineer and racing driver (d. 1989)
  - Sammy Mandell (born Salvatore Mandala), American professional boxer; in Rockford, Illinois (may have been born February 2, 1904, in Piana dei Greci, Sicily, Italy) (d. 1967)
  - Lawrence Wager, British geologist, explorer and mountaineer; in Batley, England (d. 1965, heart attack)
- Died: Thomas Wren, 80, American lawyer, U.S. Representative from Nevada

== February 6, 1904 (Saturday) ==
- Several hundred men tracking Luther Holbert and his wife for the killing of James Eastland trapped them in a swamp near Greenwood, Mississippi. A posse shot and killed two African Americans, one of whom was mistaken for Holbert, in Yazoo County, Mississippi, near Belzoni.
- In Salem, Virginia, Taylor Fields, an African American man who had allegedly spoken about a recent assault on a woman and child in an offensive way, was seized from his home by a mob and publicly whipped with a rope around his neck. An African American preacher and two other African Americans had been driven out of Roanoke, Virginia, due to their comments about the same assault case.
- In the gallery of the Princess Theater in Middlesboro, Kentucky, Policeman John Burns and a bystander, railroad switchman John Sharp, were shot and killed during a minstrel show by John White, an African American ex-convict whom Burns had threatened to arrest for vagrancy. The shooting nearly caused a human crush in the theater. White, who escaped, would be captured on February 10, and would be tried and acquitted on grounds of self-defense in January 1905.
- Born:
  - Sam Leavitt, American cinematographer; in New York City (d. 1984)
  - Raphael Tracey, American soccer player; in Gillespie, Illinois (d. 1975)
- Died:
  - William Bramwell Powell, 67, American educator and author
  - Utagawa Yoshiiku, 71, Japanese artist

== February 7, 1904 (Sunday) ==
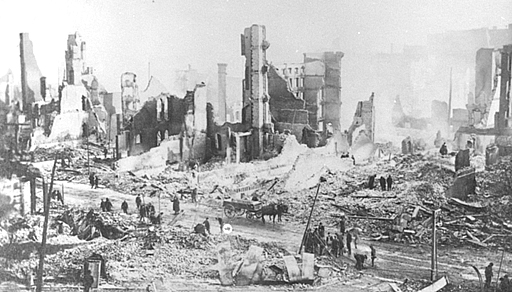
February 9, 1904: Aftermath of the Great Baltimore Fire

- The Great Baltimore Fire in Baltimore, Maryland, destroyed over 1,500 buildings in 31 hours. It would long be believed that no human deaths were caused directly by the fire, but in the early 21st century a historian would discover evidence that at least one man was killed.
- In Anderson County, Tennessee, mine guards Judd Reeder and James Colton shot and killed 3 men and wounded 3 others in a group of union members who approached them at the train station, where the guards had gone to escort non-union miners to the mine. Reeder and Colton were arrested after returning to the mine, but another guard, Cal Burton, shot and killed Deputy Sheriff Robert Harmon of the Anderson County Sheriff's Department while Harmon was trying to keep order.
- In Doddsville, Mississippi, Luther Holbert and his wife, both African American, were lynched for the February 3 killings of James Eastland and John Carr. Holbert and his wife were gruesomely tortured before being burned at the stake adjacent to an African American church and in front of a crowd of about 1000 people. The entire sequence of events had resulted in the deaths of 8 people, all of whom except Eastland were African American.
- Born:
  - Tom Bradshaw, Scottish footballer; in Coatbridge, North Lanarkshire, Scotland (d. 1986)
  - Rocco D'Assunta, Italian actor and playwright; in Palermo, Italy (d. 1970)
  - Ernest E. Debs, American politician, California State Assembly member; in Toledo, Ohio (d. 2002)
  - Milton Krims, American screenwriter (d. 1988, pneumonia)
- Died:
  - Marion T. Anderson, 64, American Union Army soldier, Medal of Honor recipient
  - James Boorman Colgate, 85, American financier
  - William Hart, 79, English-born Tasmanian businessman and politician
  - Joseph Powell Williams, 63, English politician, Member of Parliament, died of a stroke.
  - Joshua Young, 80, American Congregational Unitarian minister and abolitionist who presided over the funeral of John Brown

== February 8, 1904 (Monday) ==
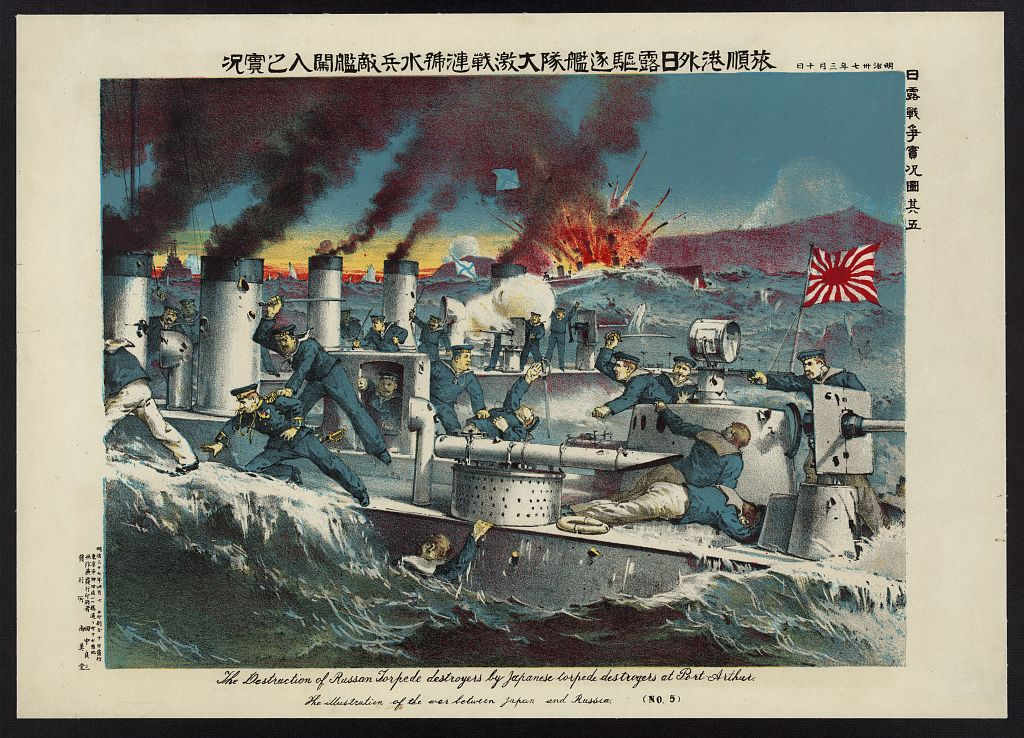
Destruction of Russian destroyers by Japanese destroyers at Port Arthur

- A surprise attack by the Imperial Japanese Navy on Port Arthur (Lüshun) in Manchuria began the Russo-Japanese War and severely disabled the Imperial Russian Navy.
- The steamer SS Tremont was destroyed by fire at its dock near Manhattan Bridge in New York City, killing one crewmember. The boat's cargo included two lions from a traveling show, who charged at firefighters aboard the ship but were repelled by water from the firemen's hoses.
- Born:
  - Igor Boelza, Soviet music historian and composer; in Kielce, Poland (d. 1994)
  - Karl, 8th Prince of Löwenstein-Wertheim-Rosenberg, German nobleman and jurist; at Löwenstein Palace, Kleinheubach, Kingdom of Bavaria, German Empire (d. 1990)
  - Hendrik Timmer, Dutch Olympic and professional tennis player; in Utrecht, Netherlands (d. 1998)
- Died:
  - Alfred Ainger, 66, British biographer
  - Amalia Ferraris, 71–76, Italian ballet dancer
  - Malvina Garrigues, 78, Portuguese operatic soprano
  - Henry W. Oliver, 63, American industrialist and politician

== February 9, 1904 (Tuesday) ==
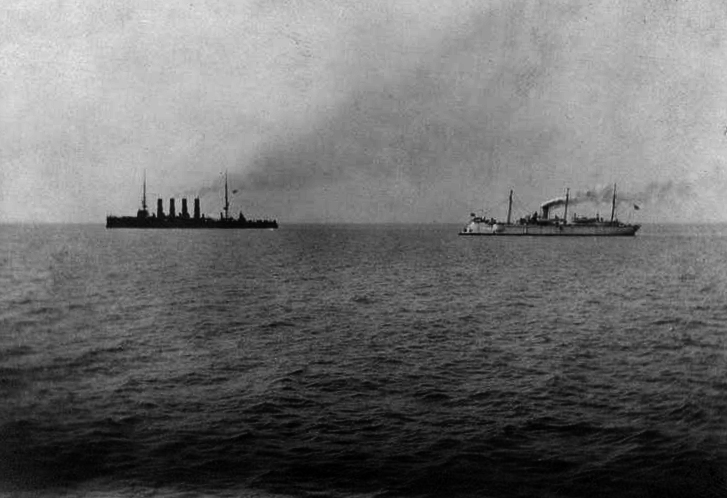
Varyag and Korietz sail out to battle

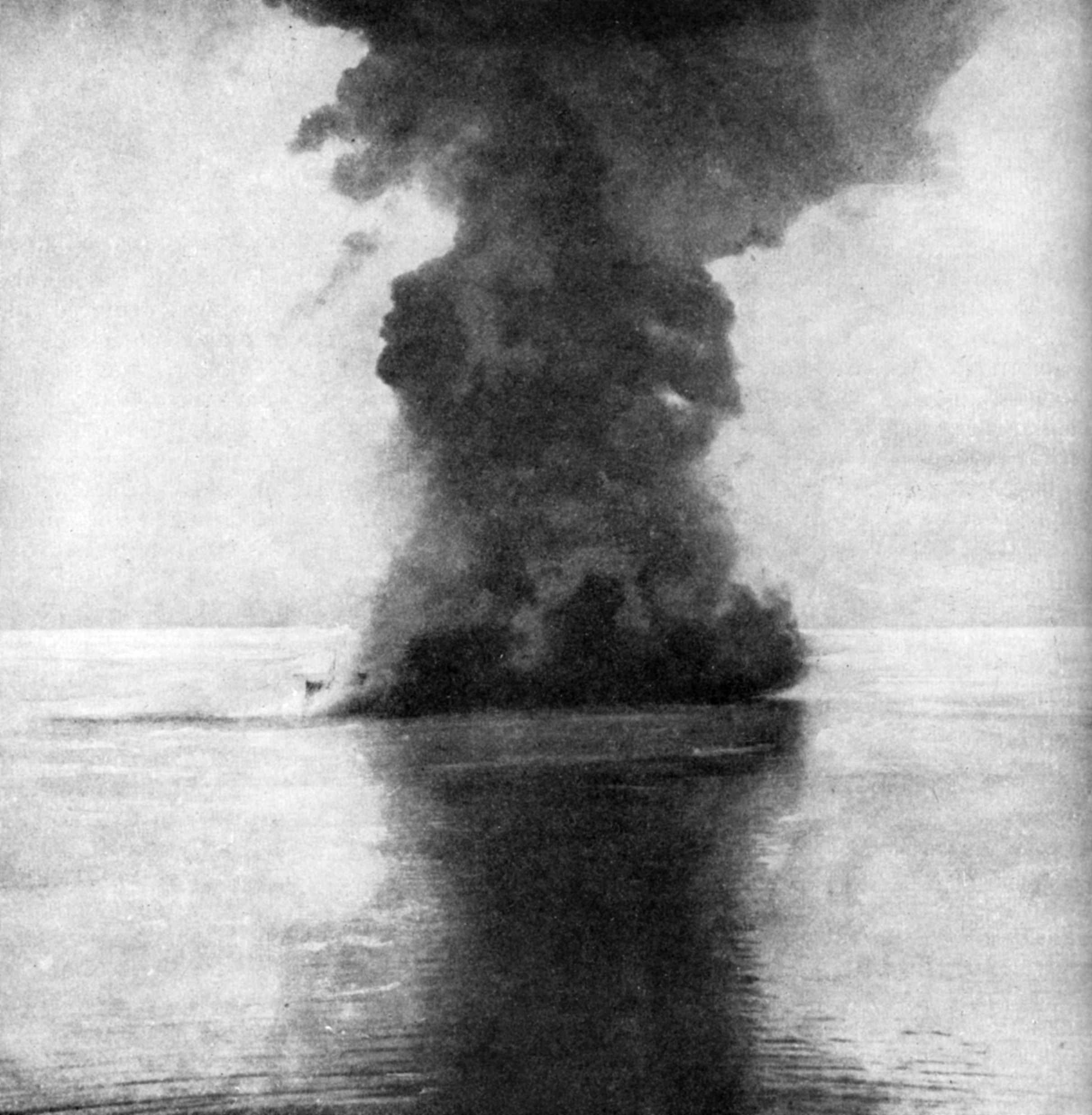
Korietz explodes after being scuttled

- At the Battle of Chemulpo Bay on the northwest coast of Korea, the Russian protected cruiser Varyag and the gunboat Korietz made a futile attack on a besieging Japanese fleet. The Russians then scuttled the Varyag, the Korietz and the transport steamer Sungari.
- Nanjim Ota, the Japanese commissioner to the Louisiana Purchase Exposition, received a cablegram from Kiyoura Keigo, Japan's Minister of Agriculture and Commerce, to the effect that the war would make no difference to the plans for the Japanese exhibit.
- A head-on collision between two Canadian Pacific Railway trains in Sand Point, Ontario killed 15 people.
- At about 1 pm, 23-year-old schoolteacher Eva Belle Moak was shot and mortally wounded in the barn of her home on Butte Creek, near Chico, California. She would die at 12:02 p.m. the following day. The murder would remain unsolved.
- Born:
  - Harold J. Arthur, American politician, Governor of Vermont; in Whitehall, New York (d. 1971, cancer)
  - Karel Bossart, Belgian American astronautical engineer and rocket scientist; in Antwerp, Belgium (d. 1975)
  - Kikuko Kawakami (born Shinoda Kikuko), Japanese author; in Shizuoka Prefecture, Japan (d. 1985)
- Died:
  - Mary Abbott, 46, American author and Olympic golfer
  - Léopold Davout d'Auerstaedt, 74, General of the Second French Empire
  - Charles Frederick Williams, 65, Scottish-Irish writer and war correspondent
  - Erastus Wiman, 69, Canadian American journalist and businessman, died of paralysis.

== February 10, 1904 (Wednesday) ==
- The Emperor of Japan issued his country's formal declaration of war against Russia.
- The Russian commissioner general to the Louisiana Purchase Exposition received a telegram announcing that, due to the war, the band of the Russian Imperial Guard would not be sent to the exposition.
- Prince Alexander of Teck married Princess Alice of Albany at St George's Chapel, Windsor Castle, on what would have been the 64th wedding anniversary of Queen Victoria, the grandmother of the bride. Randall Davidson, the Archbishop of Canterbury, officiated at the ceremony, and King Edward VII, the bride's uncle, gave her away.
- Roger Casement published the Casement Report, his account of Belgian atrocities in the Congo Free State.
- At the Metropolitan Opera House in New York City, an electric battery blew out during a performance of Lucia di Lammermoor, producing flame and smoke and causing some alarm in the dress circle. Ushers quickly reassured the audience that there was no danger.
- In Oswego, New York, a fire which started at about 4 p.m. in the chemical room of the Corn Products company's starch factory would not be brought under control until 2:30 a.m. on February 11. The fire destroyed one building and caused an estimated loss of $1,000,000. Two firefighters were seriously injured when they fell from a ladder; one of them, Truckman John Dougherty, fell 50 feet (15 m) and later died at the hospital.
- Born:
  - Walter Boas, German-Australian metallurgist; in Berlin, Germany (d. 1982)
  - Emil Bodnăraș, Romanian communist politician and army officer and Soviet agent; in Colomea (d. 1976)
  - Onésime Boucheron (born Édouard Eugène Onésime Boucheron), French racing cyclist; in Meung-sur-Loire, France (d. 1996)
  - Tito Colliander, Finnish Eastern Orthodox Christian writer; in Saint Petersburg, Russian Empire (d. 1989)
  - Leland Cunningham, American astronomer; in Wiscasset, Maine (d. 1989)
  - Otto Dannebom, German politician; in Rambsen, East Prussia (d. 1975)
  - John Farrow, Australian film director; in Marrickville, Sydney, Australia (d. 1963, coronary vascular disease)
- Died:
  - Timothy E. Ellsworth, 67, American lawyer and politician, president pro tempore of the New York State Senate
  - Nikolay Mikhaylovsky, 61, Russian writer
  - Josiah Patterson, 66, Confederate States Army officer, U.S. Representative from Tennessee
  - John A. Roche, 59, American politician, Mayor of Chicago, died of uraemia of the heart.

== February 11, 1904 (Thursday) ==
- Major patriotic celebrations took place in Tokyo. The windows of the Russian legation, overlooking a square where thousands of people celebrated, were darkened.
- At Port Arthur, the Russian torpedo boat Yenisei struck one of her own naval mines and sank. The casualties included the Yenisei's commanding officer, Captain Stepanoff.
- U.S. President Theodore Roosevelt issued a presidential proclamation declaring U.S. neutrality in the Russo-Japanese War.
- The management of the Louisiana Purchase Exposition received notification of Korea's withdrawal from participation.
- Born:
  - Keith Holyoake, 26th Prime Minister of New Zealand; in Mangamutu, New Zealand (d. 1983)
  - Henry Richardson Labouisse Jr., American diplomat; in New Orleans, Louisiana (d. 1987)
  - Osvaldo Lira (born José Luis Osvaldo Lira Pérez), Chilean Roman Catholic priest and theologian; in Santiago, Chile (d. 1996)
  - Roy MacNairy, English cricketer; in Barrow Island, Barrow-in-Furness, Lancashire, England (d. 1962)
  - José do Patrocínio Oliveira, Brazilian musician and voice actor, original voice of the Disney character José Carioca; in Jundiaí, São Paulo, Brazil (d. 1987)
  - Lucile Randon, French supercentenarian; in Alès, France (d. 2023)
- Died:
  - Henri-Raymond Casgrain, 72, French Canadian Roman Catholic priest, author and historian
  - George Lumsden, 88, Scottish-born New Zealand politician, Mayor of Invercargill
  - Vladimir Markovnikov, 65, Russian chemist
  - Élie Reclus, 77, French ethnographer and anarchist

== February 12, 1904 (Friday) ==
- The Russian cruiser Boyarin was sunk by a Russian naval mine near Port Arthur, killing six of her crew.
- The Danish newspaper Politikens Ekstrablad, which would become Ekstra Bladet in 1905, published its first edition.
- Born:
  - Donald Lambert, American jazz stride pianist; in Princeton, New Jersey (d. 1962)
  - Ted Mack (born William Edward Maguiness), American radio and television host; in Greeley, Colorado (d. 1976, heart failure)
  - Georges Paillard, French Olympic and professional cyclist; in Sainte-Gemmes-d'Andigné, Maine-et-Loire, France (d. 1998)
  - Rudolf Platte, German actor; in Hörde, Westphalia (d. 1984)
- Died:
  - Antonio Labriola, 60, Italian Marxist theoretician and philosopher
  - Rudolf Maison, 49, German sculptor, died after an operation for a stomach ulcer.
  - Sir John Voce Moore, 78, English businessman, Lord Mayor of London

== February 13, 1904 (Saturday) ==
- France and Siam reached a new agreement on the borders of the French protectorates of Laos and Cambodia.
- Born:
  - Princess Irene, Duchess of Aosta; in Athens, Kingdom of Greece (d. 1974)
  - Erwin Canham, American journalist, editor of The Christian Science Monitor; in Auburn, Maine (d. 1982 after abdominal surgery)
- Died:
  - John Ellison-Macartney (born John William Ellison), 85–86, Irish politician
  - Johan Christian Heuch, 65, Church of Norway bishop and politician
  - William J. Lemp Sr., 68, German American brewer, shot himself to death.
  - Émile Metz, 68, Luxembourgish politician, industrialist and engineer, died after surgery.

== February 14, 1904 (Sunday) ==
- The barque Scotia arrived at Laurie Island with the first Argentine crew for the formerly British meteorological station which would become Orcadas Base.
- Born:
  - Hertta Kuusinen, Finnish Communist politician; in Luhanka, Finland (d. 1974)
  - Charles Oatley, British electronic engineer; in Frome, Somerset, England (d. 1996)
  - Jean Tschumi, Swiss architect; in Plainpalais, Canton of Geneva, Switzerland (d. 1962)
- Died:
  - Charles Emerson Beecher, 47, American paleontologist, died of heart disease.
  - Magnus Blix, 54, Swedish physiologist
  - Alvinza Hayward, 82–83, American financier and businessman, died of the aftereffects of a paralytic stroke.
  - James McCann, 63–64, Irish businessman and politician, Member of Parliament for Dublin St Stephen's Green
  - Robert Milne Murray FRSE FRCPE FRSSA, 48, Scottish surgeon and medical author, died of heart failure after surgery.

== February 15, 1904 (Monday) ==
- A group of students including Huang Xing and Song Jiaoren established the revolutionary Huaxinghui (China Arise Society) in Changsha, Hunan, with Huang as its first president.
- Henry Fitzalan-Howard, 15th Duke of Norfolk, married Gwendolen Mary Constable-Maxwell in Everingham, East Riding of Yorkshire, England.
- Construction workers George Ripp, Joseph Mantell and Joseph Margo fell 11 stories to their deaths in Manhattan, New York City, when a brick wall buckled and caused the scaffolding on which they were working to fall. Another man was injured.
- Born:
  - Mary Adshead, English painter; in Bloomsbury, London, England (d. 1995)
  - Antonin Magne, French cyclist and manager; in Ytrac, Auvergne, France (d. 1983)
  - Keizo Miura, Japanese skier and mountaineer (d. 2006)
  - Louis Robert, French historian and author; in Laurière, Haute-Vienne, France (d. 1985)
  - George Taylor, Scottish botanist; in Edinburgh, Scotland (d. 1993)
- Died:
  - Mark Hanna, 66, United States Senator from Ohio, died of typhoid fever.
  - Emil Alexander de Schweinitz, 38, American bacteriologist, died of uremia.
  - Edmond Vergnet, 53, French operatic tenor

== February 16, 1904 (Tuesday) ==
- Manuel Amador Guerrero was elected as the first President of Panama, with his inauguration set for February 20.
- The Republic of Panama promulgated its first constitution.
- Born:
  - Ellis Achong, Trinidad and Tobago cricketer and footballer; in Belmont, Port of Spain, Trinidad and Tobago (d. 1986)
  - Madge Addy (born Marguerite Nuttall Addy), British nurse and spy; in Rusholme, Manchester, England (d. 1970, accidental choking)
  - James Baskett, American actor (Uncle Remus in Disney's Song of the South); in Indianapolis, Indiana (d. 1948, heart failure due to diabetes)
  - Josef Bühler, German Nazi Party politician and Holocaust perpetrator; in Bad Waldsee, Kingdom of Württemberg, German Empire (d. 1948, executed by hanging)
  - Karl-Heinz Bürger, German Schutzstaffel functionary; in Güstrow, Mecklenburg, Germany (d. 1988)
  - George F. Kennan, American diplomat and historian; in Milwaukee, Wisconsin (d. 2005)
  - Philip Rabinowitz, Lithuanian-born South African record-breaking sprinter (d. 2008, stroke)
- Died:
  - Boris Chicherin, 75, Russian historian and legal philosopher
  - John Christopher Columbus Hill, 75, American Mexican mining engineer and physician, adopted son of Antonio López de Santa Anna
  - Claude Bowes-Lyon, 13th Earl of Strathmore and Kinghorne, 79, great-grandfather of Queen Elizabeth II
  - Carl Aaron Swensson, 46, American Lutheran minister, founder and president of Bethany College, died of pneumonia.

== February 17, 1904 (Wednesday) ==
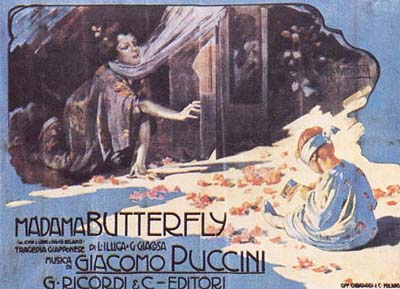
Poster for Madama Butterfly

- Giacomo Puccini's opera Madama Butterfly, with a background theme of Japan–United States relations, debuted at La Scala in Milan, Italy, to a catastrophically poor audience reception. On May 28 a revised version would open in Brescia, to great success.
- In Croton, New York, an oil lamp exploded and started a fire that killed Mrs. Jacob Antonosoa and 5 of her children.
- In Youngstown, Ohio, schoolteacher Lottie Garwood and her 7-year-old daughter, Alva, were asphyxiated by leaking natural gas which had set their house on fire. The mother died unsuccessfully trying to rescue her daughter.
- The Wright brothers visited St. Louis to inspect the location where the World's Fair's aeronautical competition was slated to take place. The competition would later be canceled.
- The state convention of the so-called "Lily White" Republicans, which included not a single African American delegate, was called to order in New Orleans, Louisiana. The old-style Republican Party, which had lost the federal offices in Louisiana to the "Lily Whites", was expected to hold its own convention at a later date. The "Lily White" convention adopted a platform asserting white supremacy and endorsed Theodore Roosevelt in the presidential election.
- Born:
  - Luis A. Ferré, Puerto Rican engineer, industrialist and politician; in Ponce, Puerto Rico (d. 2003, pneumonia and respiratory failure after surgery)
  - Hans Morgenthau, German-American political scientist; in Coburg, Saxe-Coburg and Gotha, Germany (d. 1980, perforated ulcer)
  - Erna Sondheim, German Olympic fencer; in Gauting, Bavaria, Germany (d. 2008)
- Died:
  - Hermann Emminghaus, 58, German psychiatrist
  - Alexander Stewart, 45, English first-class cricketer

== February 18, 1904 (Thursday) ==
- Mexico declared its neutrality in the Russo-Japanese War.
- Canadian journalist Benjamin Taylor A Bell fell 10 feet (3.0 m) down an elevator shaft after walking through the wrong door in a store adjacent to the Canadian Mining Review offices. He would die of his injuries on March 1.
- Col. Theodore Bruback, 52, a wealthy and well-known figure in Utah's mining industry, fell 15 feet (4.6 m) to his death from a ladder while inspecting a mine in Park City, Utah.
- Born:
  - Agostino Ernesto Castrillo, Italian Roman Catholic priest (Order of Friars Minor), Bishop of San Marco Argentano Bisignano; in Pietravairano, Caserta, Kingdom of Italy (d. 1955, lung cancer)
  - Riccardo Pacifici, Italian rabbi; in Florence, Italy (d. 1943, murdered in Auschwitz)
  - Otto Rahn, German medievalist and Schutzstaffel officer; in Michelstadt, Hesse, German Empire (d. 1939, frozen to death)

== February 19, 1904 (Friday) ==
- In Arkansas, Glen Bays, an African American man, was burned at the stake by a mixed-race lynch mob for the murder of planter J. D. Stephens the previous day. On February 20, the Los Angeles Herald's report of Bays' death would appear immediately below a joke about duke-heiress marriages in America and immediately above an advertisement for Hood's Sarsaparilla.
- The town of Jackson, Utah, was destroyed in an explosion caused by a collision between a water train and a freight train carrying dynamite and giant powder. Over 20 people were killed.
- Born:
  - Milan Gorkić, Yugoslav communist politician and activist; in Bosanski Brod, Bosnia and Herzegovina, Austria-Hungary (d. 1937, executed)
  - Havank (pseudonym of Hendrikus Frederikus van der Kallen), Dutch crime novelist and journalist; in Leeuwarden, Netherlands (d. 1964, heart attack)
  - Muiris Ó Súilleabháin, Irish police officer, author and memoirist; on Great Blasket Island, Ireland (d. 1950, drowned)
  - Walter White, British Olympic and professional boxer; in Bathgate, West Lothian, Scotland (d. 1984)
  - Giovanni Zanni, Italian footballer; in Omegna, Province of Verbano-Cusio-Ossola, Italy (d. 1974)
- Died:
  - Alice Sudduth Byerly (born Alice Lucy Sudduth), 48, American temperance activist, died of complications of indigestion.
  - John Malcolm Forbes, 58–59, American businessman and sportsman
  - Frederick Hampden Winston, 73, American lawyer and Minister to Persia

== February 20, 1904 (Saturday) ==
- The United States Army general staff designated 4 officers to serve as military observers with the Imperial Japanese Army in the Russo-Japanese War: Col. Enoch Crowder of the Judge Advocate General's Corps, artillery captains Marsh and Morrison, and Capt. Joseph E. Kuhn of the Army Corps of Engineers.
- A fire caused by a gas explosion at a celluloid factory in Paris, France, killed 16 people and injured 20.
- The federal assembly of Puerto Rico voted 60 to 15 to demand that Puerto Rico be granted either independence or U.S. statehood.
- In Pittsburgh, Pennsylvania, 4 passengers were seriously injured in a fire aboard a Pittsburgh Traction Company streetcar.
- In Wayne, New Jersey, an explosion at the mills of the Laflin & Rand Powder Company killed employees A. L. Jackson, Frederick Weimer and James Weir and injured 30 others.
- Born:
  - Herbert Brownell Jr., American lawyer and politician, Attorney General of the United States; in Peru, Nebraska (d. 1996, cancer)
  - Bramwell Fletcher, English stage, film and television actor; in Bradford, West Riding of Yorkshire, England (d. 1988)
  - Oliver Macdonald, American Olympic champion track and field athlete; in Paterson, New Jersey (d. 1973)

== February 21, 1904 (Sunday) ==
- In Prague, a Russian Orthodox church held a service of intercession for Russia's success in the Russo-Japanese War. Several hundred Slav students demonstrated outside the church, but the police prevented them from protesting outside the United States consulate.
- At the Lackawanna Steel Company plant in West Seneca, New York, a gas leak followed by an explosion asphyxiated masons George Reynolds and M. S. Smith and burned power house worker Frank Prenatt to death. Several other workers were seriously injured.
- Born:
  - Alexei Kosygin, Premier of the Soviet Union; in Saint Petersburg, Russian Empire (d. 1980)
  - Charles F. Goodeve, Canadian chemist; in Neepawa, Manitoba, Canada (d. 1980)
  - Heinrich Hergert, German international footballer; in Pirmasens, Germany (d. 1949)
  - Armand Preud'homme, Belgian composer; in Peer, Belgium (d. 1986)
- Died:
  - Abrey Kamoo (born Abbredalah Kaloss), 88–89, Tunisian-born American physician, Union Army drummer boy and American Civil War nurse
  - Lieutenant-General Charles Alexander McMahon FRS FGS, 73, Anglo-Irish soldier, geologist, and administrator

== February 22, 1904 (Monday) ==
- Argentina officially took control of the future Orcadas Base on Laurie Island.
- A 3 a.m. earthquake in San Francisco, California, caused no damage.
- At the White House in Washington, D.C., officers of the United States Secret Service arrested Edward Reiger, a man who had repeatedly written eccentric letters to U.S. President Roosevelt. Reiger was found to be carrying a loaded revolver and a box of cartridges. His letters to Roosevelt had asserted that people's names should correspond to their professions (e.g., carpenters should be named Carpenter), and that the present manner of naming people had caused a war among the flies.
- In Chicago, Illinois, 3 people died in a fire that partially destroyed the Alhambra theater hotel.
- In Ehrenfeld, Pennsylvania, a railroad engine explosion killed 3 Pennsylvania Railroad employees — railroad engineer Harry Tyson, conductor John Gontz and trackwalker George Bicker – and seriously injured 2 others.
- Born:
  - James Adams, Australian cricketer; in Toowong, Brisbane, Queensland, Australia (d. 1988)
  - Robert T. Ashmore, U.S. Representative from South Carolina; near Greenville, South Carolina (d. 1989)
  - Del Fontaine (born Raymond Henry Bousquet), Canadian boxer and convicted murderer; in Winnipeg, Manitoba, Canada (d. 1935, executed by hanging)
  - Ernst Jakob Henne, German motorcycle racer and racecar driver; in Weiler, Germany (d. 2005)
  - Juan Maglio, Argentine footballer; in Buenos Aires, Argentina (d. 1964)
  - Stéphanos I Sidarouss, Coptic Catholic cardinal, Patriarch of Alexandria; in Cairo, Egypt (d. 1987)
  - Donald Stockton, Canadian Olympic freestyle wrestler; in Montreal, Quebec, Canada (d. 1978)
  - Frank Tieri (born Francesco Tieri), Italian American mobster; in Castel Gandolfo, Lazio, Kingdom of Italy (d. 1981)
- Died:
  - Sir Leslie Stephen KCB FBA, 71, British writer, critic and mountaineer, father of Virginia Woolf and Vanessa Bell
  - John Denniston Patton, 74, U.S. Representative from Pennsylvania

== February 23, 1904 (Tuesday) ==
- Representatives of the Empire of Japan and the Korean Empire concluded the Japan–Korea Treaty of February 1904.
- The French Navy launched the experimental submarine Aigrette.
- By a vote of 66 to 14, the United States Senate ratified the Panama Canal treaty, allowing the United States to gain control of the Panama Canal Zone for $10 million.
- Chief of Police Coffee of the Sacramento Police Department was charged with having ordered officers to decapitate an African American with clubs.
- The cod-fishing schooner Mary and Ida dragged her anchor during a gale and was wrecked at Unga Island off the south coast of the Alaska Peninsula. All 8 crewmembers survived due to the efforts of fishermen from the nearby codfish station, who lowered themselves over a cliff to reach a line from the schooner.
- Born:
  - Terence Fisher, English film director and screenwriter; in Maida Vale, County of London, England (d. 1980)
  - William L. Shirer, American journalist and author; in Chicago, Illinois (d. 1993)
  - Gaston Marie Jacquier, French Roman Catholic bishop in Algeria; in Évian-les-Bains, Haute-Savoie, France (d. 1976, assassinated)
  - Ralph Breyer, American Olympic champion freestyle swimmer; in Chicago, Illinois (d. 1991)
  - Anton Kaltenberger, Austrian Olympic bobsledder; in Vienna, Austria (d. 1979)
  - Ottavio Scotti, Italian art director; in Umago, Istria, Italy (d. 1975)
  - Leopold Trepper, Polish Communist and Soviet GRU agent; in Nowy Targ, Austria-Hungary (d. 1982)
- Died:
  - Friederike Kempner, 75, German-Jewish poet
  - Albert Newton Raub, 63, American educator, president of Delaware College

== February 24, 1904 (Wednesday) ==
- The upper 4 stories of the 16-story Schiller Building in Chicago, which contained the Garrick Theater, were damaged by fire. The building was located a short distance west of the Iroquois Theater, which had burned on December 30, 1903.
- In Stockton, California, a fire in a Chinese laundry killed 5 people.
- Superintendent Frank C. Hostetter of the Louisiana Purchase Exposition post office was arrested and confessed to having opened, detained and embezzled mail matter in order to obtain inside information on the fair's concessions and exhibits for his own gain or that of friends.
- The architect of the Russian building at the Louisiana Purchase Exposition received a cablegram directing him to proceed with construction.
- In Waukegan, Illinois, an explosion that destroyed the Warner Sugar Refining Company's starch mill killed 3 workers, injured 18 and caused $250,000 in damage.
- Born:
  - Giuseppe Caron, Italian politician; in Treviso, Italy (d. 1998)
  - Giorgio de Stefani, Italian tennis player; in Verona, Province of Verona, Italy (d. 1992)
  - Werner Nilsen, Norwegian American professional soccer player; in Skien, Norway (d. 1992)
- Died:
  - Lyman G. Bennett, 71, American surveyor, civil engineer and Union Army soldier
  - James Paris Lee, 72, British-Canadian American inventor and arms designer
  - Charles F. Mayer, 77, American railroad executive and businessman, former president of the Baltimore and Ohio Railroad
  - Henry M. Pollard, 67, American lawyer and politician, U.S. Representative from Missouri

== February 25, 1904 (Thursday) ==
- The Irish National Theatre Society presented the world premiere of John Millington Synge's tragedy Riders to the Sea at the Molesworth Hall in Dublin, Ireland.
- Former Major League Baseball player Hughie Jennings, the coach of the Cornell University baseball team, jumped into an empty swimming pool at the Cornell gymnasium in Ithaca, New York, and severely injured his head and both wrists. Jennings would be reported to have completely recovered by March 11.
- A stock train collision on the Chicago Great Western Railway in Dyersville, Iowa, killed 4 men.
- Five men were killed by a cave-in on the 6th floor of the 1,000-foot (300 m) level at the Minnie Healy mine in Butte, Montana. The men were working to strengthen the walls, which were known to be in danger of collapse.
- Born: Gino Bonichi (a.k.a. Scipione), Italian painter; in Macerata, Italy (d. 1933)
- Died:
  - I. Vernon Hill, 31, English American architect, died of pneumonia.
  - Charles Marshall, 61, English first-class cricketer

== February 26, 1904 (Friday) ==
- In Somaliland, General Manning's forces killed 150 followers of Mohammed Abdullah Hassan, the "Mad Mullah", and captured 200 camels.
- A conflagration that began at 5 a.m. in Rochester, New York, would burn for 40 hours and cause about $3,000,000 in damage. The only injury from the fire was to an assistant fire chief who was bruised by a flying nozzle. The fire would become known as the Sibley fire due to the damage done to Sibley's department store.
- Born:
  - Gervan McMillan (born David Gervan McMillan), New Zealand politician and physician; in New Plymouth, New Zealand (d. 1951, heart disease)
  - Emīls Urbāns, Latvian footballer (d. 1989)
- Died: Prince Henry of Prussia, 4, brain hemorrhage caused by hemophilia after accidental fall

== February 27, 1904 (Saturday) ==
- The Wisconsin State Capitol in Madison, Wisconsin, was destroyed by a fire started by a gas jet at about 2:30 am. There were no fatalities.
- Ten crewmembers and 4 passengers died due to a fire aboard the steamer Queen, sailing from San Francisco to ports in Puget Sound. 3 pantrymen died in their bunks; 10 other deaths occurred when 3 lifeboats capsized, and one passenger, an 80-year-old woman, died from exposure.

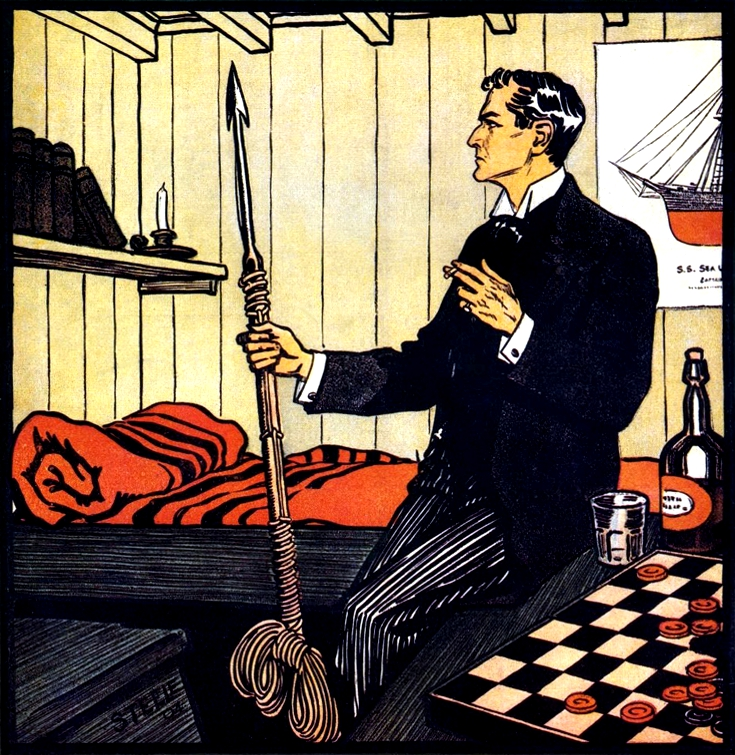
Sherlock Holmes with an unusual weapon in "The Adventure of Black Peter"

- The Sherlock Holmes short story "The Adventure of Black Peter" by Sir Arthur Conan Doyle was published for the first time in Collier's in the United States.
- Two railroad engineers were killed and 7 people injured in a collision between two trains at Luzon station in Point Richmond, California. Alvin Taylor, an African American porter who was also serving as brakeman, was blamed for the accident and was arrested the following day. Samuel Pratt, a traveling companion of one of the injured passengers, stated, "When we had got out of the wrecked cars and learned the cause of the trouble there was a great deal of indignation shown for the colored porter and I think if he had been found by those that were searching for him he would have been hanged."
- Born:
  - James T. Farrell, American author and poet; in Chicago, Illinois (d. 1979)
  - Yulii Khariton, Soviet physicist; in Saint Petersburg, Russian Empire (d. 1996)
  - André Leducq, French Olympic champion and professional cyclist; in Saint-Ouen-sur-Seine, Seine-Saint-Denis, France (d. 1980)
  - Jacques Mairesse, French Olympic and professional footballer and World War II prisoner of war; in Paris, France (d. 1940, shot during escape attempt)
  - Elisabeth Welch, American-born actress and singer; in New York City (d. 2003)
- Died:
  - William Bannon, about 80, Irish-Australian criminal and farmer
  - Charles McClary, 70, Quebec farmer and politician
  - The Tiger of Sabrodt, the last wolf shot in Lusatia
  - Esajas Zweifel, 76, Swiss politician, President of the Swiss Council of States

== February 28, 1904 (Sunday) ==
- S.L. Benfica was founded in Portugal.
- James K. Vardaman, the white supremacist Governor of Mississippi, rescued Albert Baldwin, an African American man, from being lynched in Batesville, Mississippi. Baldwin had been arrested the previous day for the murder of a railroad engineer named Fogarty in Tutwiler, Mississippi, and claimed self-defense. With a mob threatening to burn Baldwin at the stake, the Sheriff of Panola County telegraphed for Governor Vardaman's assistance, and Vardaman arrived in Batesville by special train at about daybreak, in time to take Baldwin into custody, despite a collision with a freight train on the way. The collision was considered suspicious because the engine driver of Vardaman's train was not well-disposed to Baldwin's cause.
- Born:
  - Alfred Bohrmann, German astronomer; in Feudenheim (now part of Mannheim), Germany (d. 2000)
  - Anthony Havelock-Allan, British film producer and screenwriter; in Darlington, County Durham, England (d. 2003)
- Died:
  - Anthony Durier, 71, American Roman Catholic bishop
  - Henry Hooper, 21, American college football center, died of appendicitis.
  - Barbara MacGahan (born Varvara Nikolaevna Elagina), 53, Russian American novelist and war correspondent
  - Sir Arthur Power Palmer, GCB, GCIE, 63, British Indian Army general, former Commander-in-Chief, India
  - Alfred Velghe (a.k.a. Levegh), 33, French racing driver, died of tuberculosis.

== February 29, 1904 (Monday) ==
- U.S. President Theodore Roosevelt established the Isthmian Canal Commission to oversee construction of the Panama Canal, nominating Rear Admiral John Grimes Walker as chairman and Major General George Whitefield Davis, William Hubert Burr, Benjamin Morgan Harrod, Carl E. Grunsky, Frank J. Hecker and William Barclay Parsons as members.
- Twelve people, most of them children, died in a fire that destroyed a house in Saint-Félicien, Quebec.
- The post office in Humphrey, Arkansas, was destroyed with dynamite in protest of the appointment of an African American postmaster.
- Newspapers published a letter from Booker T. Washington to the Birmingham Age-Herald, in which the African American leader stated, "Within the last fortnight three members of my race have been burned at the stake; of these one was a woman. Not one of the three was charged with any crime even remotely connected with the abuse of a white woman. In every case murder was the sole accusation. All of these burnings took place in broad daylight, and two of them occurred on Sunday afternoon in sight of a Christian church. These barbarous scenes are more disgraceful and degrading to the people who inflict punishment than to those who receive it. If the law is disregarded when a negro is concerned, it will soon be disregarded when a white man is concerned."
- Born:
  - James Hamilton, 4th Duke of Abercorn (d. 1979)
  - Rukmini Devi Arundale (born Neelakanta Shastri), Indian theosophist, dancer and choreographer; in Madurai, Madras Presidency, British India (d. 1986)
  - H. Hugh Bancroft, British-Canadian organist and composer; in Cleethorpes, Lincolnshire, England (d. 1988)
  - Jimmy Dorsey, American bandleader; in Shenandoah, Pennsylvania (d. 1957, throat cancer)
  - Pepper Martin (born Johnny Leonard Roosevelt Martin), American Major League Baseball third baseman and outfielder; in Temple, Oklahoma (d. 1965, heart attack)
  - Alan Richardson, Scottish pianist and composer; in Edinburgh, Scotland (d. 1978)
- Died:
  - Jere Baxter, 52, American businessman, lawyer and politician, died of kidney disease and exhaustion due to starvation.
  - Antonio De Martino, 89, Italian physician
  - Henri Joseph Anastase Perrotin, 58, French astronomer
