= Hergert =

Hergert is a surname. Notable people with the surname include:

- Heinrich Hergert (1904–1949), German footballer
- Joe Hergert (1936–2016), American college and professional football player
- Magdalena Hergert (1878-1938), American pioneer missionary
- Mickey Hergert (born 1941), American football player
