= George Burr =

George Burr may refer to:

- George Burr (cricketer) (1819–1857), English cricketer and priest
- George Lincoln Burr (1857–1938), American historian, diplomat, author and educator
- George Elbert Burr (1859–1939), American printmaker and painter
- George Washington Burr (1865–1923), American general
- George Houston Burr (1881–1958), American architect
- George O. Burr (1896–1990), American biologist
