= Evergreen Cemetery (Boston, Massachusetts) =

Historic cemetery in Suffolk County, Boston

- U.S. National Register of Historic Places
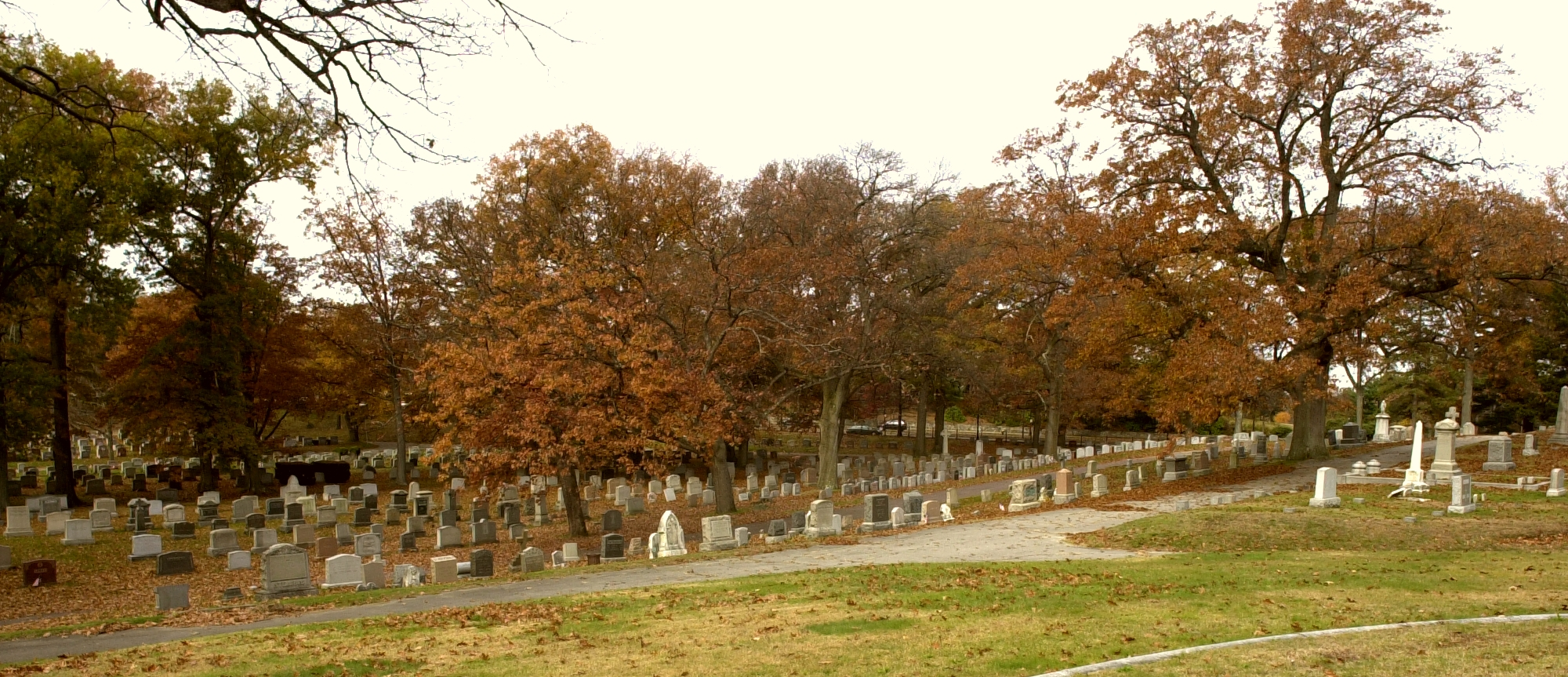
- Location: 2060 Commonwealth Avenue Brighton, Massachusetts
- Coordinates: 42°20′19″N 71°09′44″W
- Area: 19.66 acres (7.96 ha)
- Built: 1850
- NRHP reference No.: 09000612
- Added to NRHP: August 14, 2009

Evergreen Cemetery is a historic cemetery in the Brighton neighborhood of Boston, Massachusetts.

== History ==
The cemetery was established in 1850 by the town of Brighton (which was annexed to Boston in 1874), and was laid out in the then-fashionable rural cemetery style inspired by Mount Auburn Cemetery in Cambridge. Its entrance gate was built in 1892, and its Jacobethan office building was added in 1903. Boston architect James Mulcahy designed the office building.

The older portions of the cemetery are characterized by winding lanes (now paved, originally gravel), with outcrops of Roxbury puddingstone.

The cemetery was listed the National Register of Historic Places in 2009.

== Notable interments ==
- Horatio J. Homer (1848–1923), Boston's first African-American police officer
- William Jackson (1848–1910), bridge designer and city engineer of Boston
- Richard H. Taylor (1870–1956), Medal of Honor recipient
- William W. Warren (1834–1880), U.S. Congressman 1875–1877

== Gallery ==
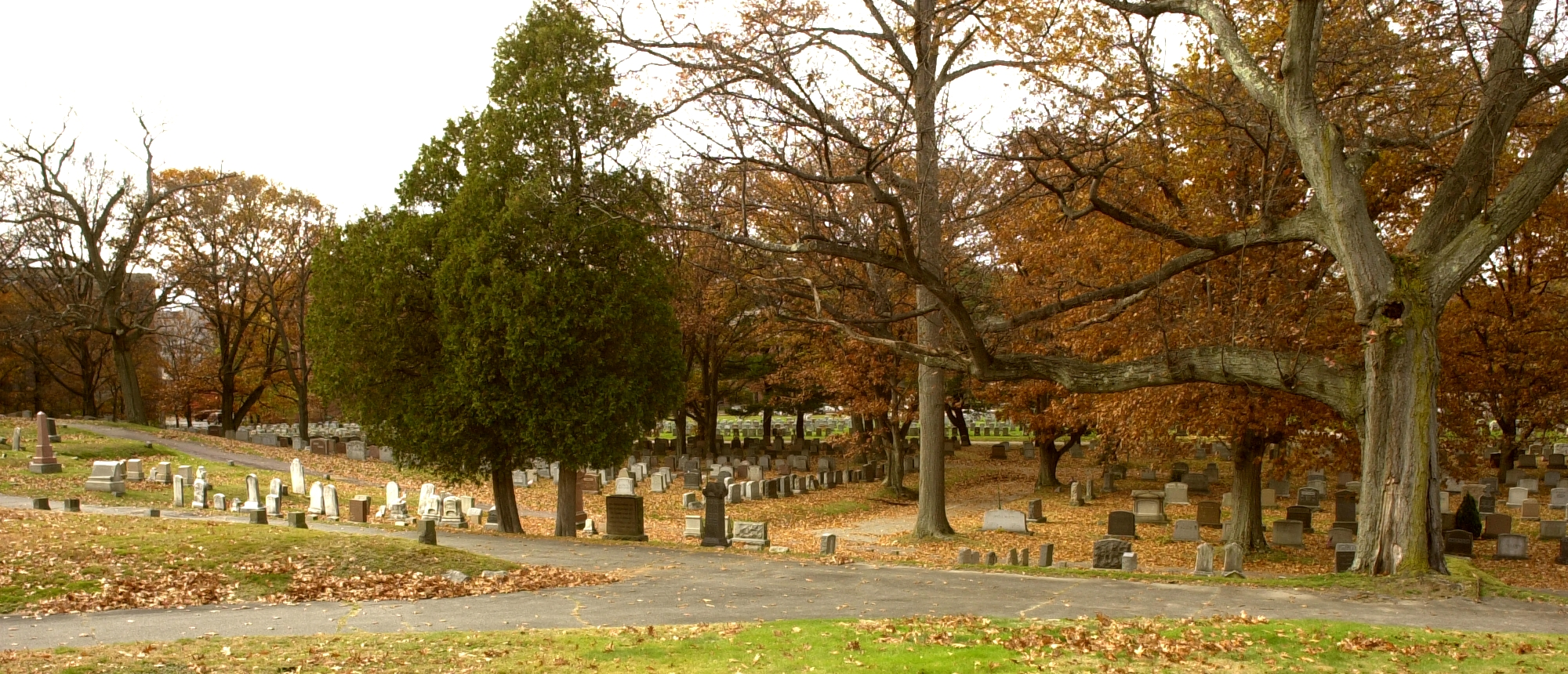

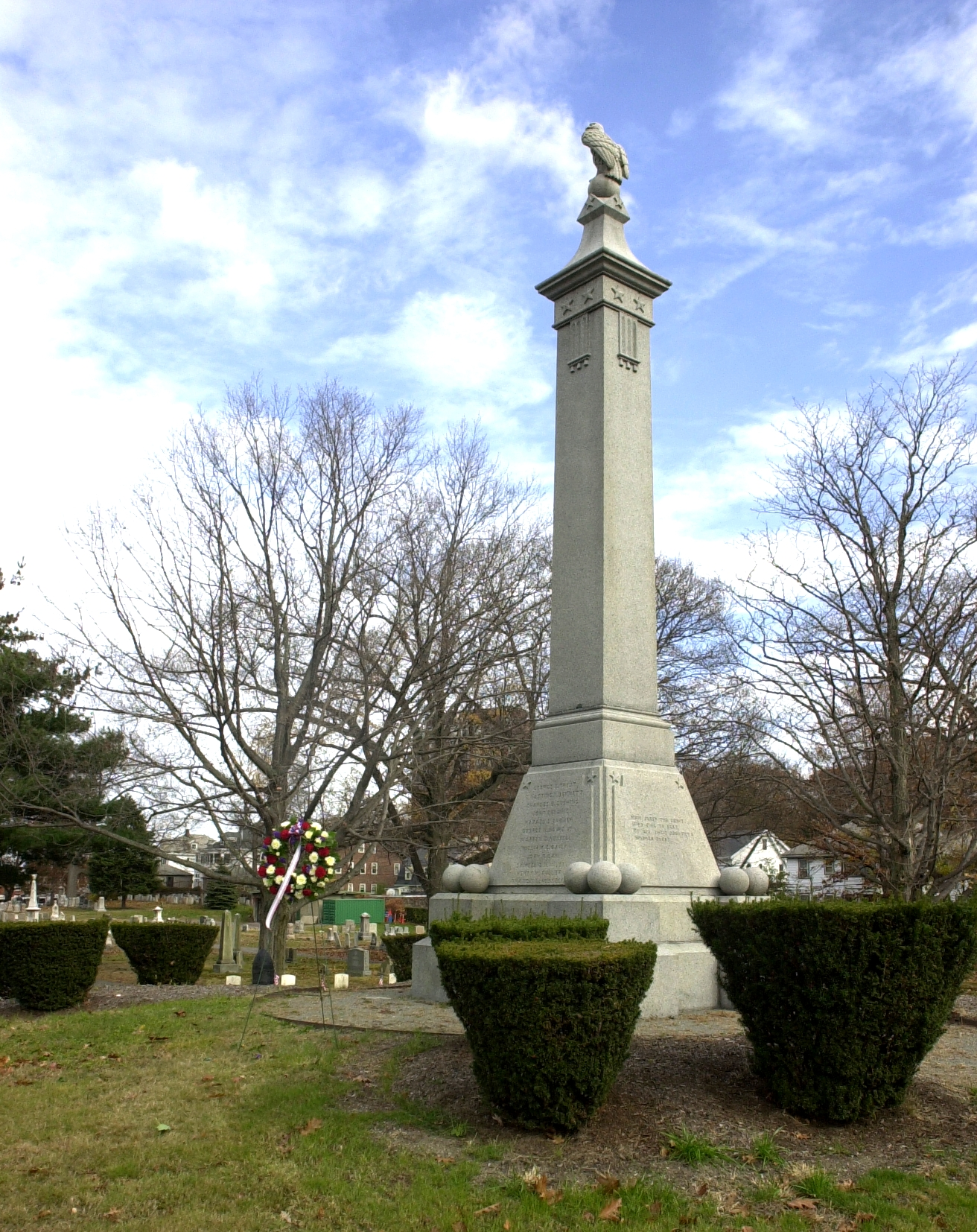

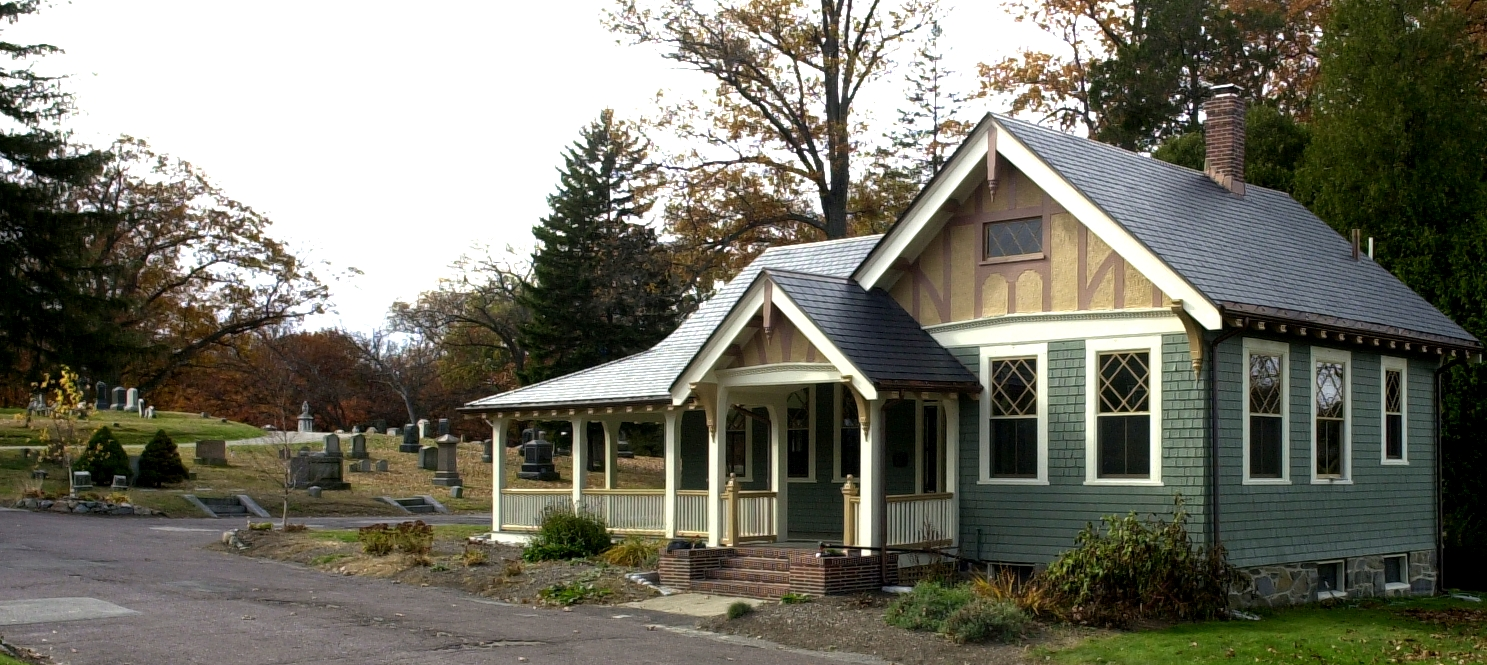

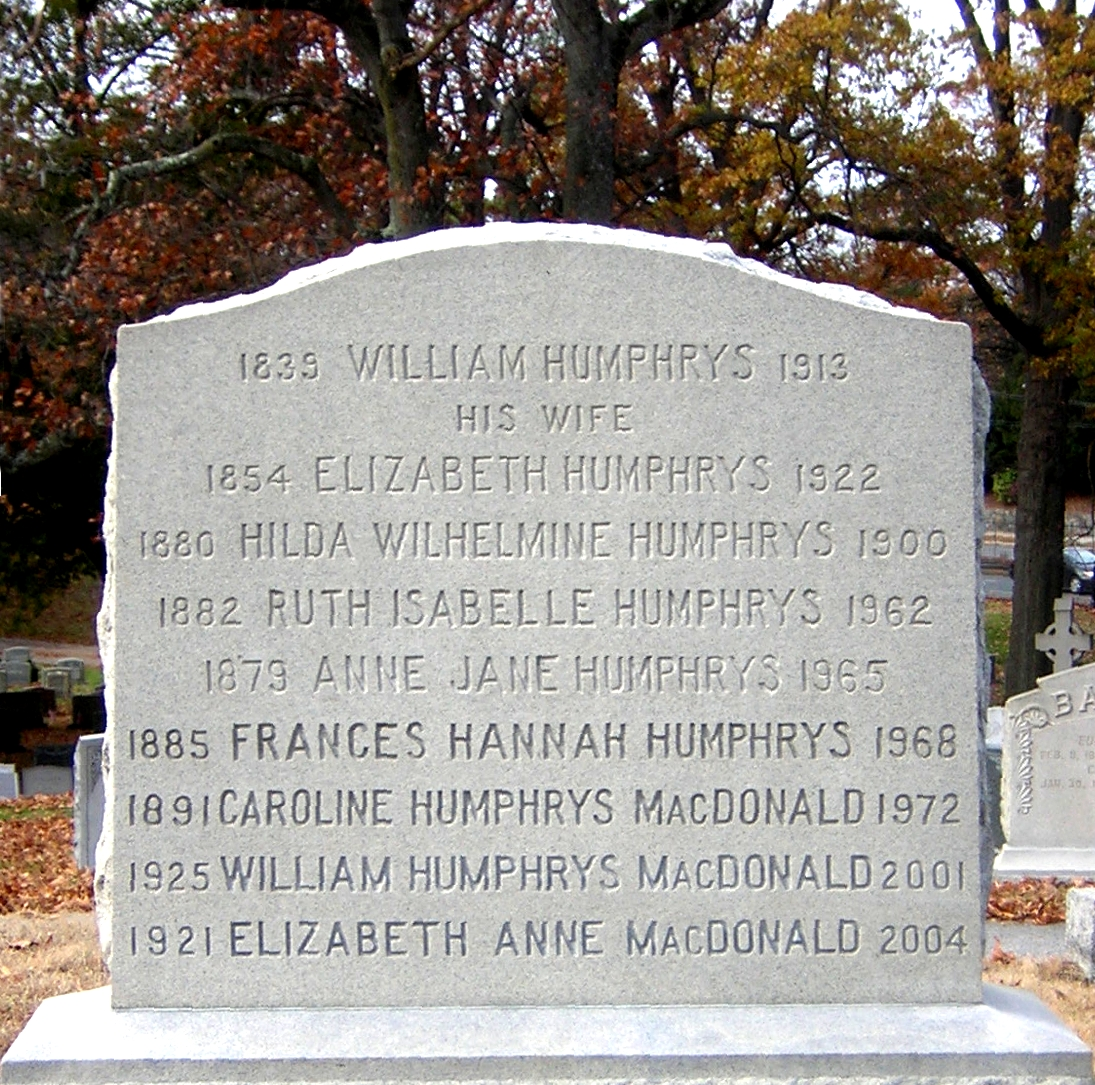

== See also ==
- List of cemeteries in Boston, Massachusetts
- National Register of Historic Places listings in southern Boston, Massachusetts
