= Commonwealth Armory =

Coordinates: 42°21′9.18″N 71°7′4.03″W

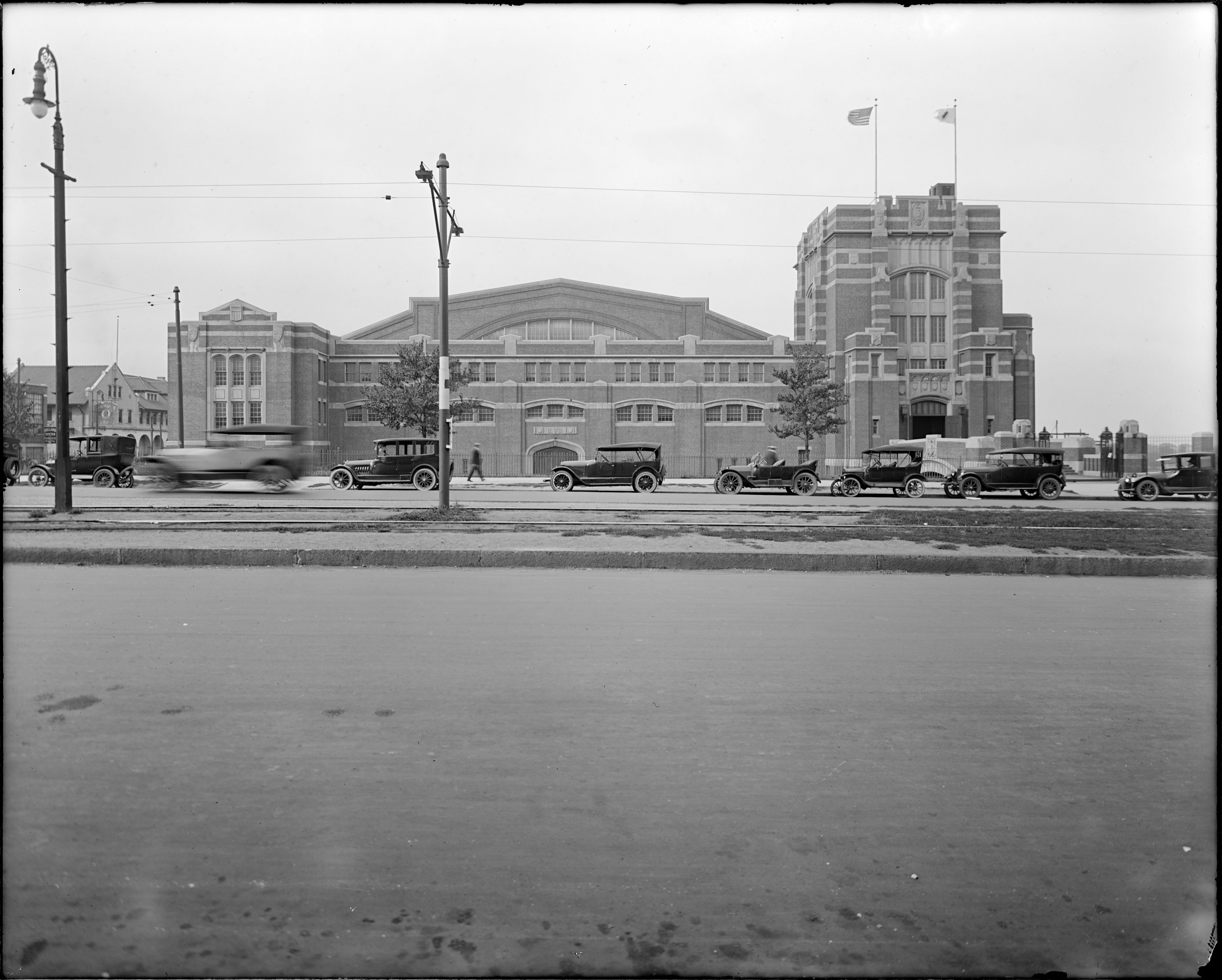
The armory, in 1920

The Commonwealth Armory was a Massachusetts Army National Guard armory. It was built at the intersection of Gaffney Street (later renamed Harry Agganis Way) and Commonwealth Avenue in Boston, Massachusetts in 1914–1915 for Troops A, B, C, and D of the First Squadron Cavalry, Battery A of the Massachusetts Field Artillery, the Field Hospital Corps, Ambulance Corps, and the Signal Corps. It was designed by Boston architect James E. McLaughlin, who also designed Fenway Park, the Benedict Fenwick School in Boston, and the Hudson Armory in Hudson, Massachusetts. During its life, it was home to military units, the Boston Auto Show, a concert by the Who in October 1969, and anti-war demonstrations. It was demolished in 2002 and replaced by the Agganis Arena in 2004.

== See also ==
- Yankee Division
