= James E. McLaughlin =

Canadian-American architect (1873–1966)

James Ernest McLaughlin (18 October 1873 – 17 February 1966) was a Canadian-American architect active primarily in Boston, Massachusetts, and the surrounding area from about 1905 through the 1950s. He designed Fenway Park—home stadium of the Boston Red Sox baseball team—among many other buildings in Massachusetts. Early in his career, McLaughlin collaborated on some designs with his maternal uncle and fellow architect James Mulcahy. From 1920 onward, McLaughlin was partnered with architect George Houston Burr under the name McLaughlin and Burr.

== Early life ==
McLaughlin was born on 18 October 1873 (some sources say 1874 or 1875) in Halifax, Nova Scotia, Canada.

In 1885, at the age of 12, McLaughlin immigrated to Boston. On 4 April 1908, he married Mary Josephine Ratigan in Boston. Her parents were Thomas Ratigan and Ellen Heany. James and Mary's son, James Ernest McLaughlin, Jr., was born in 1912.

== Professional career ==
The 1893 Boston Directory listed McLaughlin as a draftsman working at 43 Milk Street in Boston and boarding in Everett, Massachusetts. He began practicing as an architect around 1905. In 1912, McLaughlin designed the now-iconic Fenway Park, home stadium of the Boston Red Sox. Some of his other early projects include Massachusetts Army National Guard armories in the central Massachusetts towns of Hingham, Hudson, Natick, and Newton. McLaughlin collaborated on the armory projects with his maternal uncle and fellow architect James Mulcahy; it is not clear whether they were formal business partners. In 1916, a year after Mulcahy's death, McLaughlin designed the Commonwealth Armory in Boston.

In 1914 a certain George Houston Burr started working for McLaughlin as a draftsman, becoming an architect in his own right in 1915. In 1920 the two men formed a partnership under the name McLaughlin and Burr. The architectural firm of McLaughlin and Burr remained active into the 1950s, designing multiple residential, commercial, and public buildings (including many schools) throughout Massachusetts.

== Later life ==
McLaughlin was a longtime resident of the Chestnut Hill neighborhood of Brookline, Massachusetts. He lived at the 326 Reservoir Road home he designed in 1914. He died on 17 February 1966 at his home.

== Works ==
This is a partial list.

=== Individual ===
- Benedict Fenwick School, Boston
- Commonwealth Armory, Boston
- Fenway Park, Boston

=== With James Mulcahy ===
- Hingham Armory, Hingham
- Hudson Armory, Hudson
- Natick Armory, Natick
- Newton Armory, Newton

=== As McLaughlin and Burr ===
- 65 Commonwealth Avenue, Boston
- Boston Latin School, Boston
- Dorchester High School, Dorchester
- Hotel Bradford (former Elks Hotel), Boston
- Mary E. Curley School, Jamaica Plain
- South Boston Police Station (District 6), Boston
- Temple Israel Meeting House, Boston
