= 110th Cavalry Regiment (United States, 1988–1996) =

26th Cavalry; 110th Cavalry
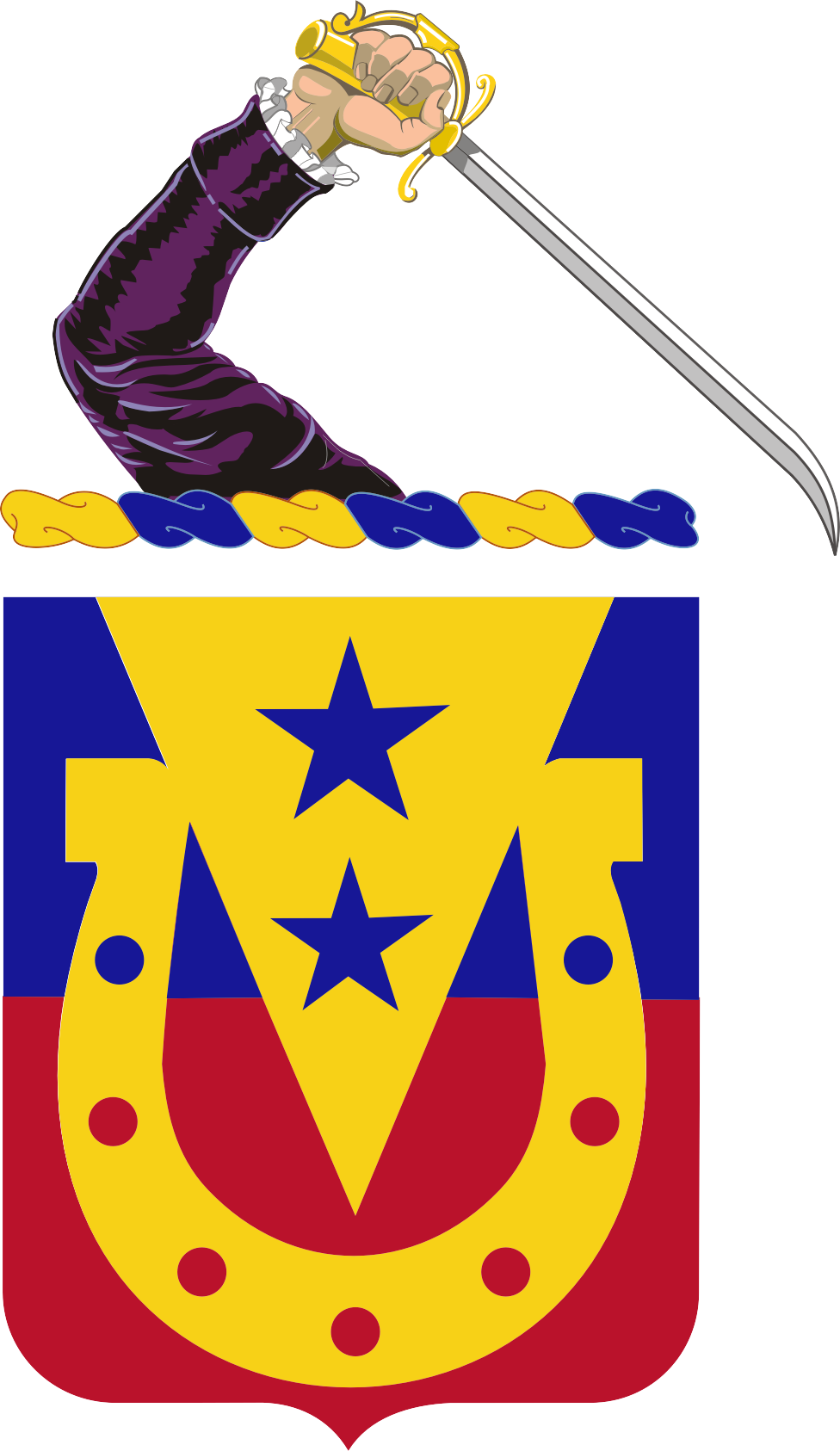
- Coat of arms
- Active: 1963–1996
- Country: United States
- Branch: Army
- Type: Cavalry
- Motto: "Yankee Eyes"

Insignia
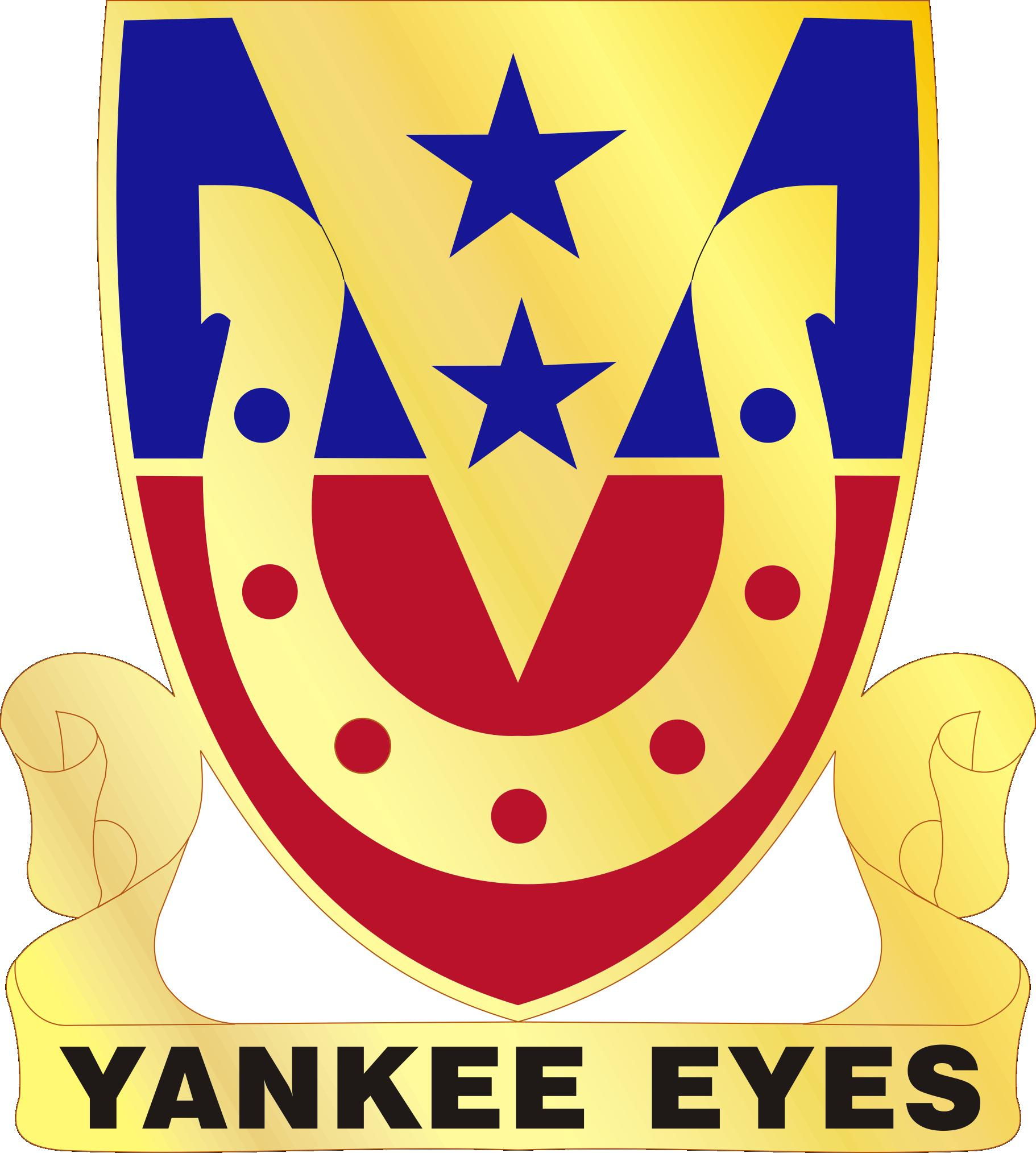
- Distinctive unit insignia

The 110th Cavalry is an inactive parent cavalry regiment of the United States Army National Guard. Constituted as the 26th Cavalry under the Combat Arms Regimental System in 1963, its 1st Squadron served with the 26th Infantry Division during the Cold War. It was renumbered in 1988 as the 110th and reorganized under the United States Army Regimental System in 1988 before the 1st Squadron inactivated in 1996 as a result of reductions in the National Guard after the end of the Cold War.

== History ==
The regiment was constituted on 27 February 1963 in the Massachusetts Army National Guard as the 26th Cavalry, a parent regiment under the Combat Arms Regimental System. It was organized on 1 March with the 1st Squadron, an element of the 26th Infantry Division. The 1st Squadron was redesignated from the 2nd Reconnaissance Squadron, 110th Armor, which had been organized in the Massachusetts NG on 1 May 1959. Between 16 and 19 December 1967, the 1st Squadron was reorganized and Troop C was allotted to the Connecticut Army National Guard. Troop D, at Worcester, Massachusetts, were successors to The Emit Guards of Worcester, circa 1967 to 1970.

On 1 May 1971 it was again reorganized with Troop D being allotted to the Rhode Island Army National Guard while Troop C remained a Connecticut unit. Troop D, was redesignated from Warwick-stationed Troop E, 43rd Cavalry, and relocated to North Kingstown on 1 June 1974. The squadron was again reorganized on 1 October 1986, now with all troops Massachusetts units except for Troop A, which became a Connecticut unit. Except for its scout platoon, Troop D was expanded into the nondivisional 122nd Aviation Battalion in this reorganization, while the scout platoon became the 173rd Infantry Detachment for long-range surveillance.

The regiment was renumbered as the 110th Cavalry on 1 February 1988, with the 1st Squadron now solely a Massachusetts unit. The regiment was reorganized under the replacement United States Army Regimental System on 1 June 1989, with 1st Squadron headquartered at Concord. The 1st Squadron, 110th Cavalry was relieved from the 26th Infantry Division on 1 September 1993 when the division was reduced to the 26th Infantry Brigade, 29th Infantry Division, continuing its service with the 26th Brigade.

In 1994, HHT was at Concord with a detachment at Westover, while Troop A was at Hudson, Troop B at Methuen, and Troops C and D were air cavalry units at Westover Air Reserve Base. Troops A and B had a strength of 125 personnel, while C and D had 34 each; HHT had a combined strength of 231. The 1st Squadron was inactivated in 1996.
