= Benedict Fenwick School =

- U.S. National Register of Historic Places
- Mass. State Register of Historic Places
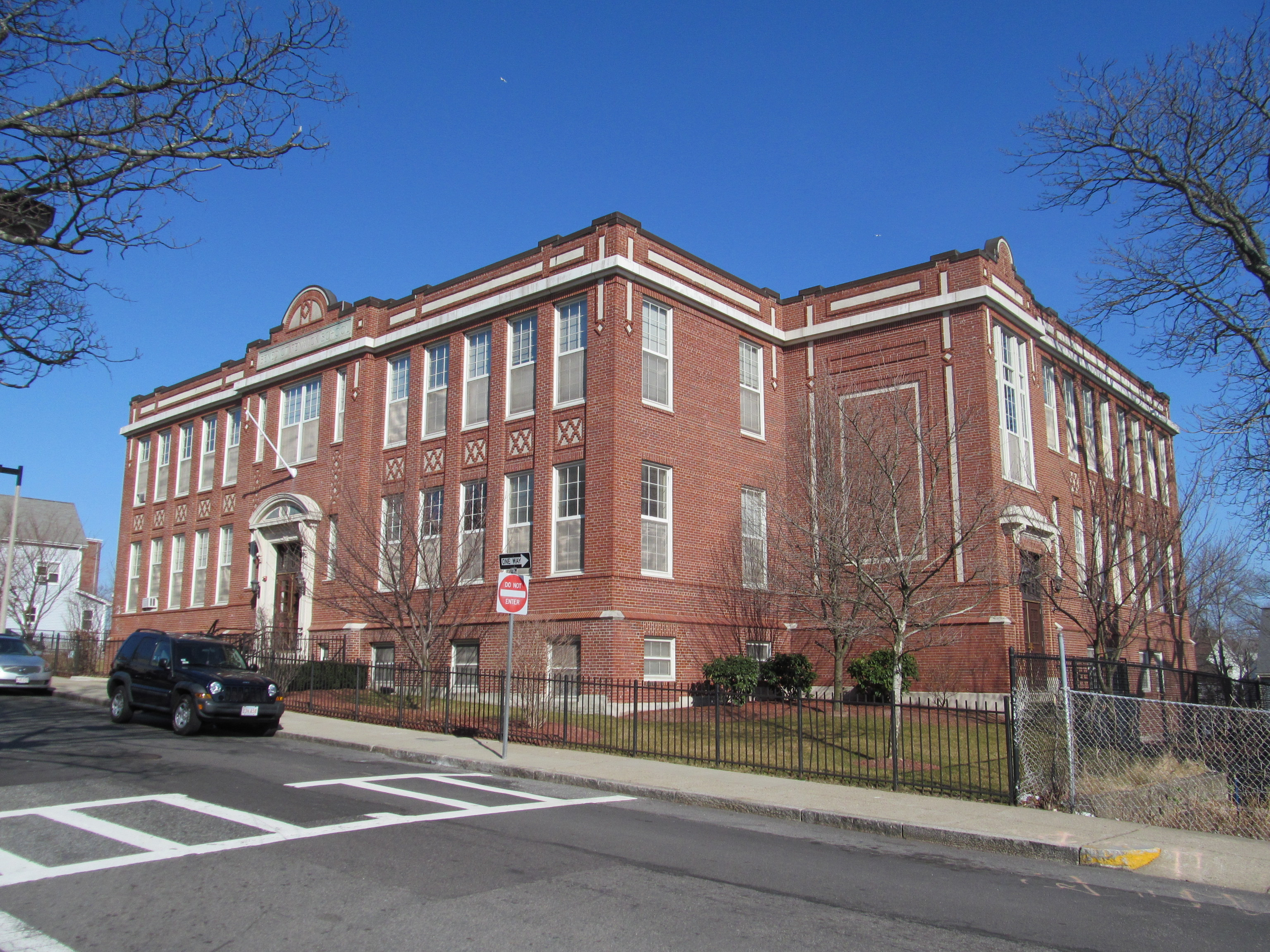
- Benedict Fenwick School

- Location within Massachusetts Location within the United States
- Location: Boston, Massachusetts
- Coordinates: 42°18′49″N 71°4′21″W
- Built: 1912
- Architect: James E. McLaughlin
- Architectural style: Colonial Revival
- NRHP reference No.: 04000023
- MSRHP No.: BOS.6538
- Added to NRHP: February 11, 2004

The Benedict Fenwick School (or Sister Clara Muhammad School) is a 1912 historic school building at 150 Magnolia Street in Boston, Massachusetts. The Classical Revival brick school building was designed by Boston architect James E. McLaughlin, who also designed Fenway Park, the Commonwealth Armory in Boston, and the Hudson Armory in Hudson, Massachusetts. It was named for Benedict Fenwick, the second bishop of the Roman Catholic Archdiocese of Boston. The city used it as a school until 1981. It was purchased by the American Muslim Mission and opened the following year as the Sister Clara Muhammad School, named for Clara Muhammad, the first wife of Nation of Islam founder Elijah Muhammad. In 1999, it was acquired by a developer and converted to housing.

The building was listed on the National Register of Historic Places in 2004. It is listed on the Massachusetts State Register of Historic Places.

== See also ==
- National Register of Historic Places listings in southern Boston, Massachusetts
