= Mount Hope Cemetery (Boston) =

Historic cemetery

- U.S. National Register of Historic Places
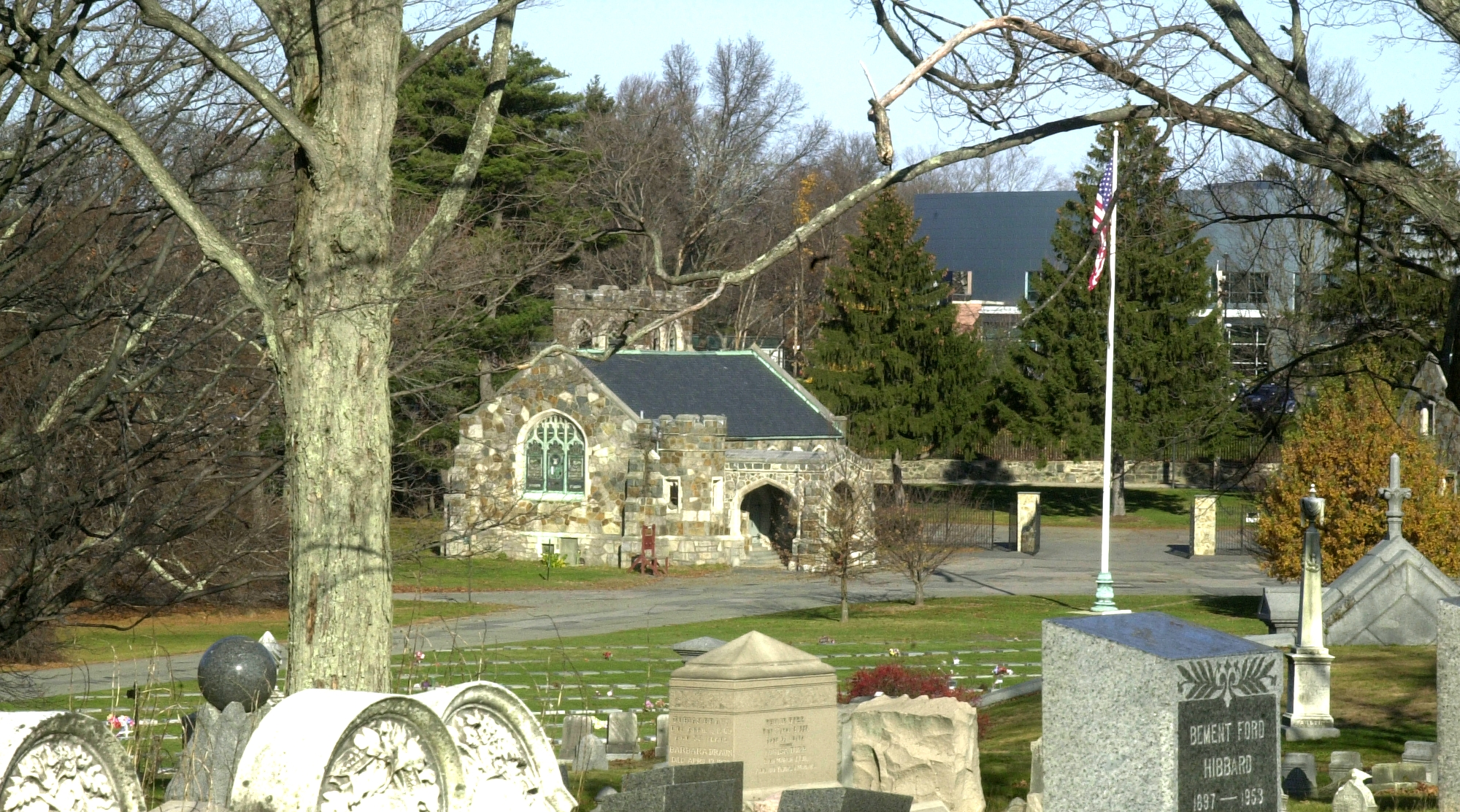
- Location: 355 Walk Hill Street, Mattapan, Massachusetts
- Coordinates: 42°16′58″N 71°06′30″W
- Area: 125 acres (51 ha)
- NRHP reference No.: 09000767
- Added to NRHP: September 25, 2009

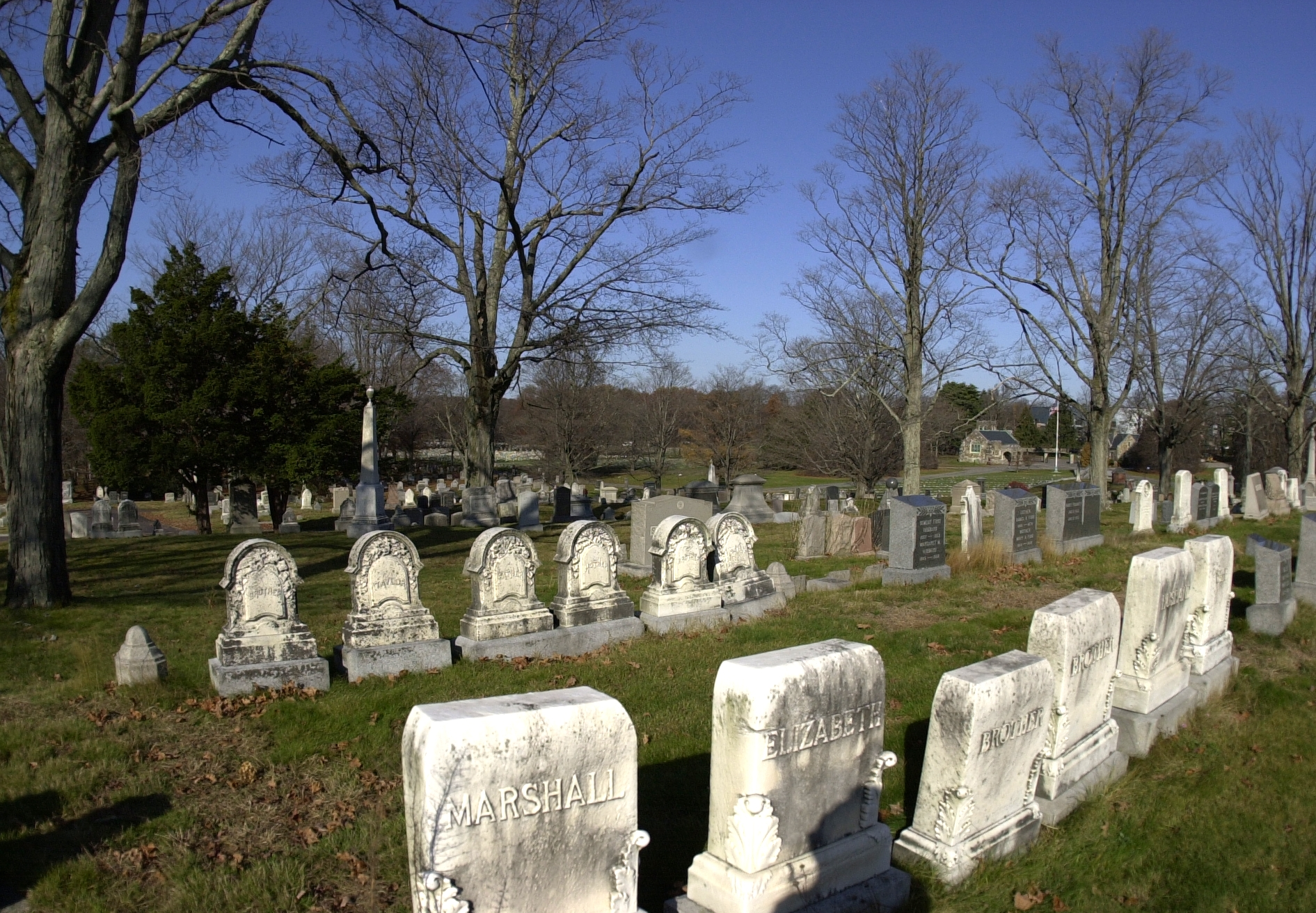

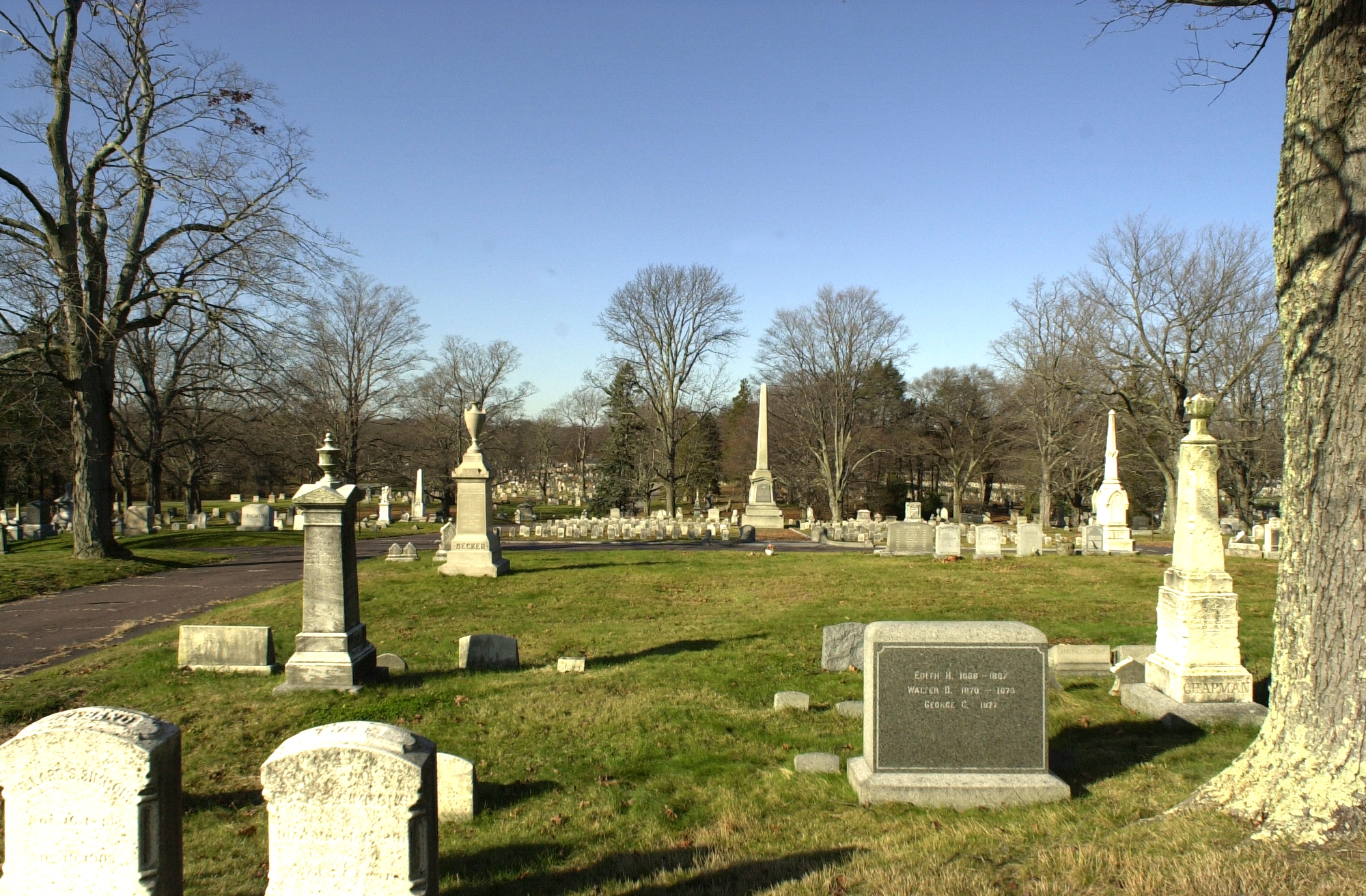

Mount Hope Cemetery is a historic cemetery in southern Boston, Massachusetts, between the neighborhoods of Roslindale and Mattapan.

== Description and history ==
Mount Hope was established in 1852 as a private cemetery, and was acquired by the city five years later. It was the city's first cemetery to be laid out in the rural cemetery style, with winding lanes. It was at first 85 acres (34 ha) in size; it was enlarged by the addition of 40 acres (16 ha) in 1929. Its main entrance is on Walk Hill Street, on the northern boundary. The cemetery's office building was designed by Boston architect James Mulcahy.

The cemetery was added to the National Register of Historic Places on September 25, 2009.

In May 2020, the remains of fifty victims of infectious diseases, including smallpox, typhus, yellow fever, syphilis, and other diseases, were removed from the cemetery on Gallops Island in Boston Harbor where they were threatened by storm damage and reinterred in the Graceland section of Mount Hope. Their identities are unknown; they died between 1871 and 1902 and the fifty include people of African, Asian, and European origin.

In October 2021, a new memorial headstone for African American Civil War nurse Susie King Taylor was dedicated in a ceremony sponsored by the Massachusetts Sons of Union Veterans of the Civil War and attended by Boston mayor Kim Janey. Originally, the grave marker only contained her second husband's name, Russell Taylor (1854-1901); cemetery records indicate that she was buried with him in 1912. The new stone includes Taylor's name as well as an inscription of her likeness.

== Notable interments ==
- Medal of Honor recipients
  - David J. Campbell (1874–1955), Spanish-American War
  - Leonard Chadwick (1878–1940), Spanish-American War
  - Henry Hendrickson (1862–1912), Spanish-American War
  - Frank Elmer Smith (1864–1943), China Relief Expedition
  - William Spicer (1864–1949), Spanish-American War
- Other noted persons
  - Elmer Chickering (1857–1915), photographer
  - George Dixon (1870–1908), first Canadian and first black world boxing champion.
  - Gottlieb Graupner (1767–1836), musician
  - The Grimké sisters
    - Angelina Grimké (1805–1879), abolitionist and women's rights advocate
    - Sarah Moore Grimké (1792–1873), abolitionist and women's right advocate
  - Rudolf Haffenreffer (1847–1929), German-American brewer
  - Roland Hayes (1887–1977), lyric tenor, first African American to sing at Carnegie Hall
  - Will “Cannonball” Jackman (1895–1972), Negro League baseball player
  - Luther "Georgia Boy" Johnson (died 1976), American Chicago blues and electric blues guitarist, singer and songwriter.
  - Abrey Kamoo (1815–1904), Tunisian-born American physician and Civil War nurse
  - John Edward Kelly (1839–1884), Irish Revolutionary
  - Michael "King" Kelly (1857–1894), Hall of Fame baseball player
  - Thomas McKeller (1890–1962), model for artist John Singer Sargent
  - Thomas W. Piper (1849–1876), Canadian-born serial killer "The Boston Belfry Murderer"
  - Susie King Taylor (1848–1912), first African American to teach openly in a school for former slaves, first black Army nurse
  - Mary Ella Waller (1855–1938), novelist
  - Theodore Dwight Weld (1803–1895), abolitionist

== See also ==
- National Register of Historic Places listings in southern Boston, Massachusetts
