= Leonard Chadwick =

American sailor (1878–1940)

- Born: November 24, 1878; Middletown, Delaware
- Died: May 18, 1940 (aged 61); Boston, Massachusetts
- Military career
- Allegiance: United States of America
- Branch: United States Navy
- Rank: Gunner's Mate Third Class
- Unit: USS Marblehead (C-11)
- Conflicts: Spanish–American War
- Awards: Medal of Honor

Leonard Chadwick (November 24, 1878 – May 18, 1940) was a Spanish–American War Medal of Honor recipient who served in the United States Navy as an Apprentice 1st Class aboard the USS Marblehead (C-11).

== Biography ==
Chadwick was born in Middletown, Delaware and enlisted in the U.S. Navy in Philadelphia on October 26, 1895, serving aboard the USS Richmond, Vermont, Constellation, Alliance, Puritan, Brooklyn, Texas and Marblehead.

Chadwick was one of fifty-two men to receive the Medal of Honor for an operation involving locating and cutting oceanic cables to block communication from a cable house off the shore of Cientuegos, Cuba. He received his medal on July 7, 1899. Leonard McKuiry Chadwick was born at Middletown, Delaware, USA, on Nov 24, 1878. He joined the US Navy and served as an Apprentice, First Class. During the Spanish/American War on May 11, 1898, he was with a boat Party attempting to cut a chain in Santiago Harbour under a heavy fire. His courage earned him the Congressional Medal of Honour, the US equivalent of the Victoria Cross (VC).

Medal of Honor Citation: "On board the USS Marblehead during the operation of cutting the cable leading from Cienfuegos, Cuba, 11 May 1898. Facing the heavy fire of the enemy, Chadwick set an example of extraordinary bravery and coolness throughout this period."

Chadwick was next heard of in 1920 at a boarding house in Boston, where he awaited his niece's graduation as a nurse, then accompanied her to Nova Scotia. She later married a Dr Fowler. It is assumed that Chadwick died before 1940

After his discharge, Chadwick moved to Boston, Massachusetts where he sold insurance and worked in the Morocco leather industry. A 1923 accident left him with a dislocated elbow and knee and he was declared totally disabled in 1937. Chadwick died at his home of asphyxiation and alcoholism on May 18, 1940, and was interred in Mount Hope Cemetery, West Roxbury, Massachusetts.

Chadwick has also been credited with inventing the cocktail, Long Island Iced Tea, although this is not confirmed.

== Military awards ==
United States

- Medal of Honor
- Sampson Medal
- Spanish Campaign Medal

=== Medal of Honor citation ===

Citation: On board the USS Marblehead during the operation of cutting the cable leading from Cientuegos, Cuba, May 11, 1898. Facing the heavy fire of the enemy, Chadwick set an example of extraordinary bravery and coolness throughout this period.

== See also ==
- List of Medal of Honor recipients
- List of Medal of Honor recipients for the Spanish–American War
