= James Mulcahy =

Canadian-American architect (1858-1915)

- Born: January 11, 1858; Halifax, Nova Scotia, British North America
- Died: July 17, 1915 (aged 57)
- Occupation: Architect

James Mulcahy (11 January 1858 – 17 July 1915) was a Canadian-American architect active primarily in Boston, Massachusetts, and the surrounding area from at least 1888 until his death in 1915. He served as Boston Building Commissioner from 1903 to 1906. He collaborated for many years with his nephew and fellow architect James E. McLaughlin, who designed Fenway Park, home stadium of the Boston Red Sox baseball team.

== Early life ==
Mulcahy was born on 11 January 1858 in Halifax, Nova Scotia, British North America.

== Professional career ==
Mulcahy was a prolific and prominent architect, well-known and apparently well-liked by his Boston peers. He was in practice at least as early as 1888. In 1903 he was appointed Boston Building Commissioner by then Mayor of Boston Patrick Andrew Collins. Upon his appointment, the Boston-based trade magazine The American Architect and Building News congratulated Mulcahy, noting that "Mr. James Mulcahy, an architect of some fifteen years' practice...is still a comparatively young man, being only forty-three years old, but he has carried out a large number of important buildings." He served as Commissioner until he was dismissed in 1906, possibly as a result of losing political favor after Collins's death the year before.

Some of his later projects include Massachusetts Army National Guard armories in the central Massachusetts towns of Hingham, Hudson, Natick, and Newton. Mulcahy collaborated on the armory projects with his nephew (son of his sister) and fellow architect James E. McLaughlin; it is not clear whether they were formal business partners, though McLaughlin had worked with his uncle at Milk Street as early as 1893.

== Works ==
This is a partial list.

=== Individual ===
- Copley School, Charlestown
- Evergreen Cemetery office, Boston
- Mount Hope Cemetery office, Boston
- Townhouse on Bay State Road, Boston
- William Bacon School, Roxbury
- William E. Russell School, Dorchester
- W. L. P. Boardman School, Roxbury

=== With James E. McLauglin ===
- Hingham Armory, Hingham
- Hudson Armory, Hudson
- Natick Armory, Natick
- Newton Armory, Newton
