= Hudson Armory =

Former military facility in Hudson, Massachusetts

Coordinates: 42°23′23.5″N 71°34′16.5″W

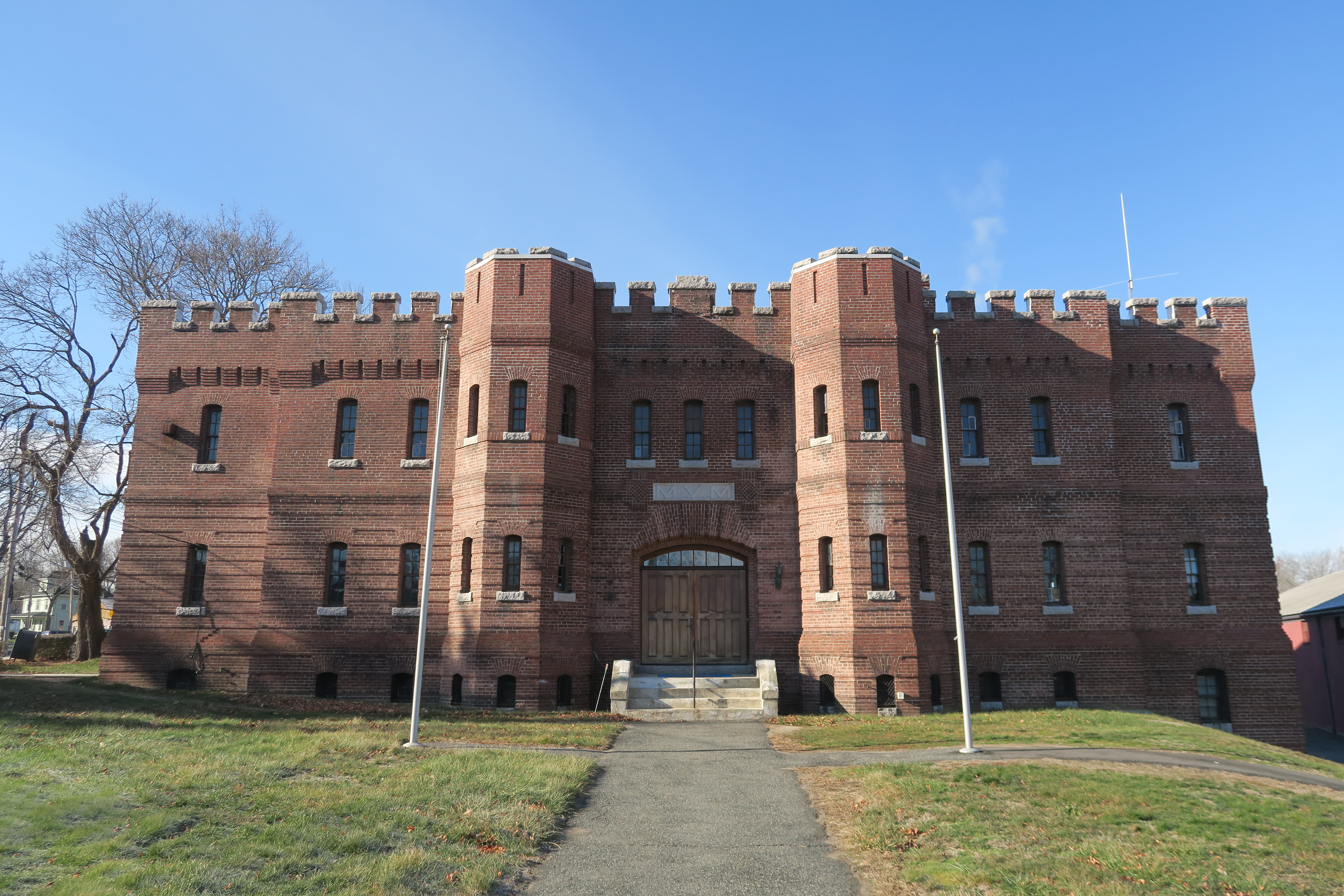
Hudson Armory

The Hudson Armory is a former Massachusetts Army National Guard armory and training center located at 35 Washington Street in Hudson, Massachusetts, United States. It is a castle-like, two-story brick masonry building built in 1910 at the intersection of Park Street and Washington Street in Hudson along the Assabet River. It was originally constructed for the Massachusetts Volunteer Militia. It was designed by architects James E. McLaughlin and James Mulcahy. As of June 2021, there are plans to convert the currently vacant armory into a community arts center.

== History ==
In 1887 Hudson resident Colonel Adelbert Mossman, an American Civil War Union veteran, formed the town's first unit of the Massachusetts Volunteer Militia (MVM): Company L, 5th Infantry Regiment, 2nd Brigade of the Massachusetts Volunteer Militia—also known as the Hudson Light Brigade. Mossman served as the 41-person unit's first commanding officer. In 1888 Hudson's Company L drilled in an old skating rink. In 1899 they conducted drills in the second floor auditorium of Hudson Town Hall. In 1907 the entire MVM was reorganized into the Massachusetts Army National Guard. Soon after this reorganization it became clear to Brigadier General William H. Brigham—an MVM adjutant general and Hudson resident—that the unit needed its own space, and he advocated for the armory's construction.

The Hudson Armory was built in 1910 for $50,000 on the site of the former Marshall Wood House or Marshall Wood Estate, a two-story wood-framed house. It was dedicated on 31 December 1910. Architects James E. McLaughlin and James Mulcahy of Boston designed the armory for the Massachusetts Volunteer Militia. Around the same time, McLaughlin and Mulcahy also designed armories in the nearby towns of Hingham, Natick, and Newton. McLaughlin later designed Fenway Park, the Commonwealth Armory, and the Benedict Fenwick School in Boston, among many other projects.

When originally constructed the Hudson Armory included a two-lane bowling alley in the basement, showers, an 80-foot-long (24 m) indoor rifle shooting range, a mess hall capable of seating 300 people, and a bar for non-commissioned officers (NCOs). The initial design called for recreational areas on the Assabet River behind the armory, including a boat launch, although these were not built.

At some time prior to 2019, the armory was inactivated as a military facility, acquired by the Commonwealth of Massachusetts, and used for police and firefighter training. In March 2019 the armory's future was unclear, except that the Commonwealth planned to pull out of the facility on 30 June 2019, and the Town of Hudson was considering purchasing the property. A nonprofit 501(c)(3) organization called Hudson Cultural Alliance, Inc., was founded in 2019 to spearhead the armory's redevelopment into a community arts center. In 2020 Hudson's Board of Selectmen and Town Meeting each voted to approve the project, but did not appropriate funds to finance renovation. In June 2021 the Massachusetts Senate passed an amendment to their fiscal year 2022 budget adding $230,000 to help the Town of Hudson and Hudson Cultural Alliance purchase the building.

In August 2022 the Hudson Cultural Alliance, a 100% volunteer run organization, completed the transaction with the town of Hudson to acquire the property and immediately lease it to the Hudson Cultural Alliance (HCA). The HCA then began raising the necessary funds (approx $2M) to complete basic safety renovations with several phases of fundraising and improvements planned to turn the facility into the largest independent, volunteer-run, Cultural and Performing Arts Center in MetroWest.

=== Units based at the Hudson Armory ===
National Guard units stationed at the Hudson Armory have fought and served during the 1916 Pancho Villa Expedition, World War I, World War II, and the Iraq War. They were also part of the National Guard contingents sent to break the 1912 Lawrence textile strike and prevent looting in the aftermath of the 1953 Worcester tornado. Prior to the construction of the armory, the Massachusetts Volunteer Militia unit stationed in Hudson guarded property damaged in the Great Boston Fire of 1872 and served in the 1898 Spanish–American War.

- Company L of the 5th Infantry Regiment: 1910–1921
- Company B of the 181st Infantry Regiment: 1921–1959
- Company F of the 181st Infantry Regiment: 1947–1959
- Company B of the 1st Battalion 110th Armor: 1959–1988
- Troop A of the 1st Squadron 110th Cavalry: 1988–1995
- Battery A of the 1st Battalion 102nd Field Artillery: 1995–2006
- Company C of the 26th Brigade Special Troops Battalion: 2006–2008
- Company D of the 1st Battalion 181st Infantry: 2006–?
- Company C of the 126th Brigade Support Battalion: 2008–?

== Architecture ==
The castle-like, two-story brick masonry building features a crenellated parapet, narrow rectangular windows which imitate loopholes, and two octagonal towers on the building's front façade along Washington Street. The window sills and caps on top of the crenellations are made of granite. The brickwork is highly detailed, with many corbels and arches.

== See also ==
- Yankee Division
- List of military installations in Massachusetts
