= Otto Dannebom =

German politician (1904–1975)

Member of the Bundestag
- In office 7 September 1949 – 6 October 1957

Personal details
- Born: 10 February 1904 Rambsen
- Died: 5 November 1975 (aged 71)
- Party: SPD

Otto Dannebom (10 February 1904 – 5 November 1975) was a German politician of the Social Democratic Party (SPD) and former member of the German Bundestag.

== Life ==
In the first Bundestag election in 1949, he was directly elected to parliament in the constituency of Dortmund III - Lünen with 44.8% of the valid votes cast and defended his direct mandate in the 1953 election as well.

== Literature ==
Herbst, Ludolf; Jahn, Bruno (2002). Vierhaus, Rudolf (ed.). Biographisches Handbuch der Mitglieder des Deutschen Bundestages. 1949–2002 [Biographical Handbook of the Members of the German Bundestag. 1949–2002] (in German). München: De Gruyter - De Gruyter Saur. p. 1715. ISBN 978-3-11-184511-1.
