= George Houston Burr =

American architect (1881–1958)

George Houston Burr (29 May 1881 – 30 September 1958), also known as G. Houston Burr or Houston Burr, was an American architect primarily active in Boston, Massachusetts, and the surrounding area from at least 1910 into the 1950s. From 1920 onward Burr was partnered with fellow architect James E. McLaughlin, who had previously designed Fenway Park, the home stadium of the Boston Red Sox baseball team. Their architectural firm was called McLaughlin and Burr.

== Early life ==
Burr was born on 29 May 1881 in Maryland. Burr married Regina Muriel Robinson of New Jersey in 1908 or 1909. George and Regina had three children together.

== Professional career ==
Burr graduated from Cornell University College of Architecture in 1905 and was working as a draftsman by 1910. In 1912 he became an architect and partnered with fellow architect Frank T. Lent; their office was located in Leominster, Massachusetts. Burr moved to Cambridge, Massachusetts, a year later in 1913 and began working in the office of architect James E. McLaughlin in 1914. Apparently Burr was initially demoted back to draftsman in McLaughlin's office, although by 1915 he was again going by the title "architect." In 1920 the two men formed a partnership under the name McLaughlin and Burr. The architectural firm of McLaughlin and Burr remained active into the 1950s, designing multiple residential, commercial, and public buildings (including many schools) throughout Massachusetts. Burr was a member of the American Institute of Architects from 1921 to 1942.

== Later life ==
Burr died on 30 September 1958 in Belmont, Massachusetts.

== Works ==
This is a partial list.

=== As McLaughlin and Burr ===
- 65 Commonwealth Avenue, Boston
- Boston Latin School, Boston
- Dorchester High School, Dorchester
- Hotel Bradford (former Elks Hotel), Boston
- Mary E. Curley School, Jamaica Plain
- South Boston Police Station (District 6), Boston
- Temple Israel Meeting House, Boston
