= Agostino Ernesto Castrillo =

Italian Roman Catholic bishop

Venerable Agostino Ernesto Castrillo O.F.M.
- Bishop of San Marco Argentano e Bisignano
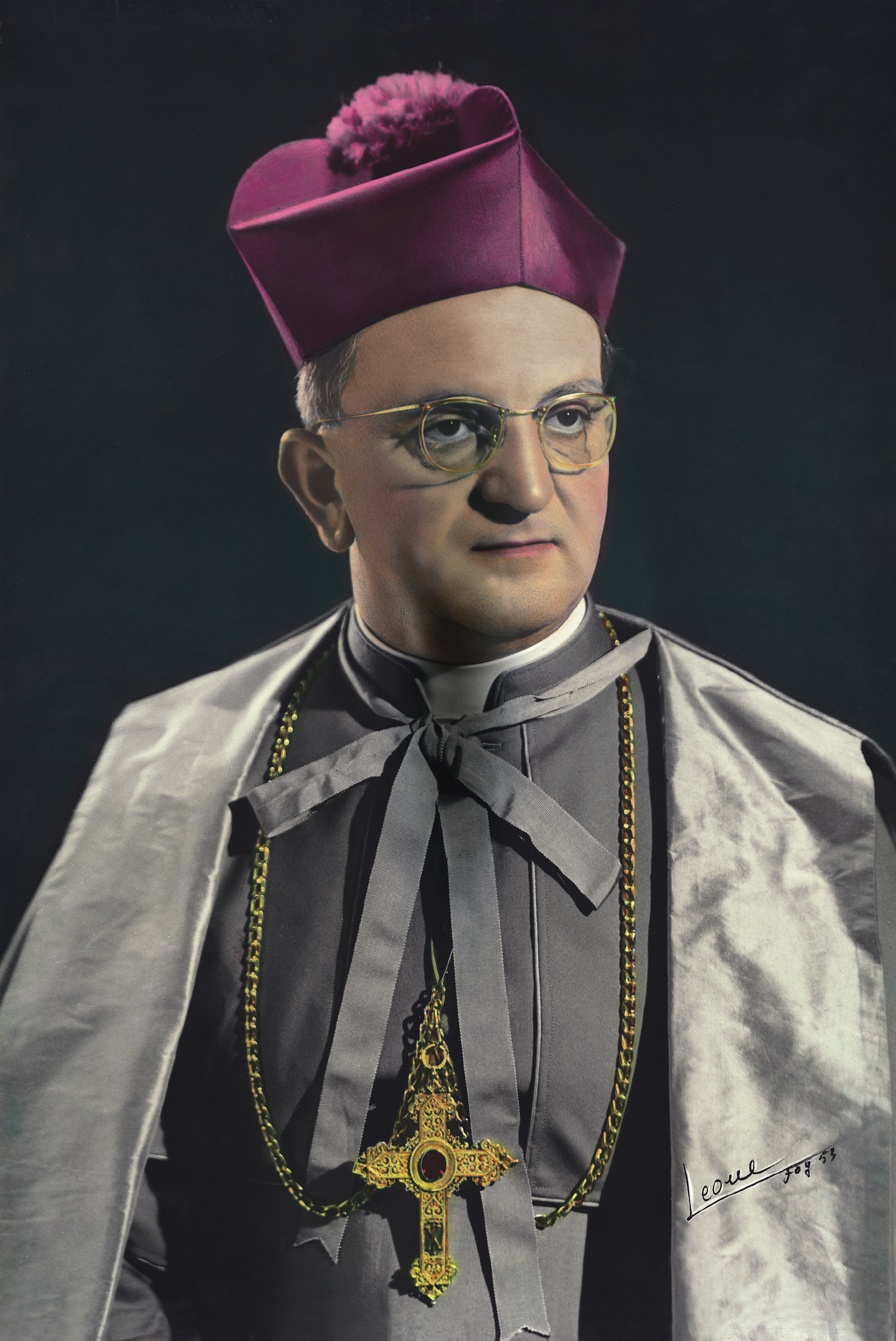
- Castrillo in December 1953.
- Church: Roman Catholic Church
- Diocese: San Marco Argentano Bisignano
- See: San Marco Argentano Bisignano
- Appointed: 17 September 1953
- Term ended: 16 October 1955
- Predecessor: Michele Rateni
- Successor: Luigi Rinaldi

Orders
- Ordination: 11 June 1927
- Consecration: 13 December 1953 by Fortunato Maria Farina

Personal details
- Born: Agostino Ernesto Castrillo; 18 February 1904 Pietravairano, Caserta, Kingdom of Italy
- Died: 16 October 1955 (aged 51) Cosenza, Calabria, Italy
- Motto: Amor justitia pax ("Love, justice and peace")
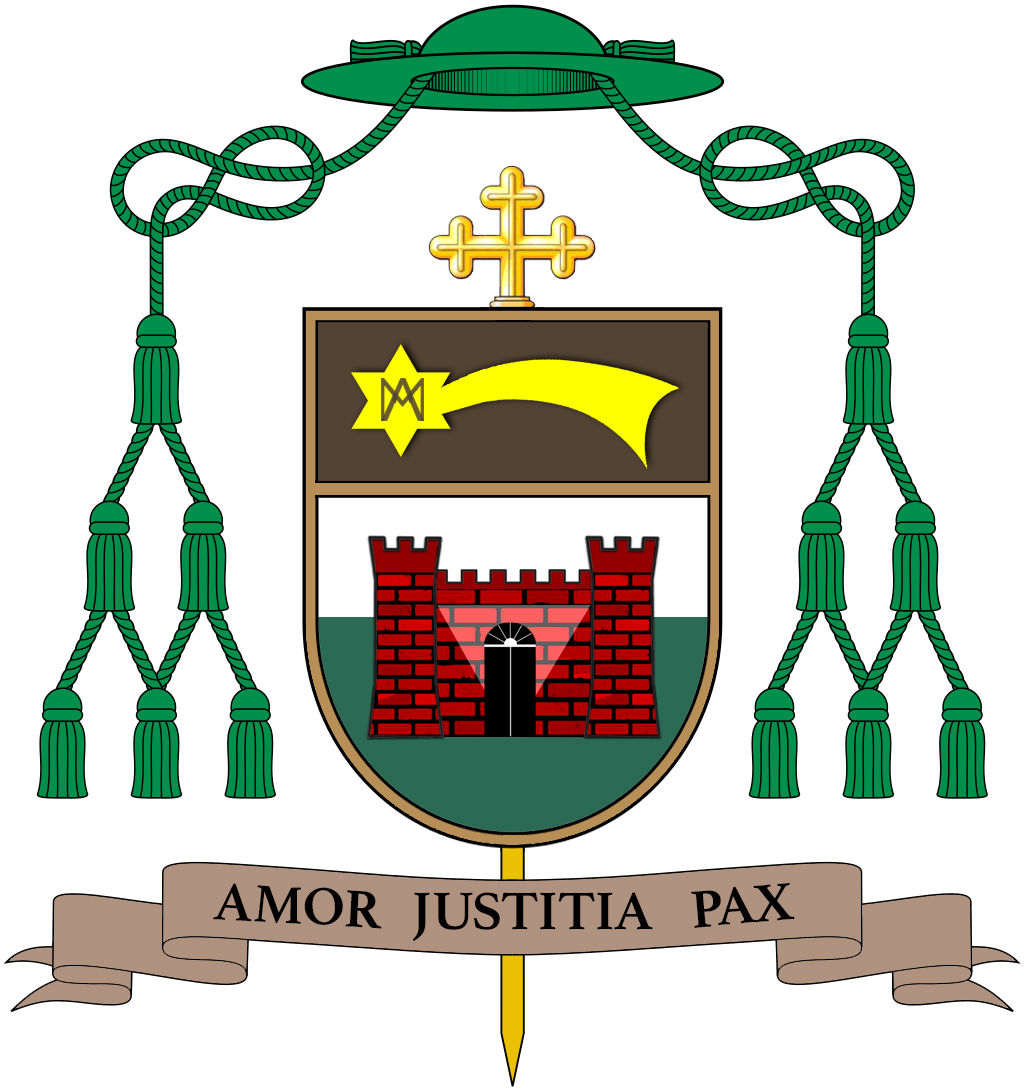
- Coat of arms

Sainthood
- Venerated in: Roman Catholic Church
- Title as Saint: Venerable
- Attributes: Bishop's attire; Franciscan habit

Agostino Ernesto Castrillo (18 February 1904 – 16 October 1955) was an Italian Roman Catholic professed member of the Order of Friars Minor and the Bishop of San Marco Argentano Bisignano. Castrillo served as a pastor in Foggia during World War II and died of lung cancer not long following his 1953 appointment as a bishop.

The cause for sainthood commenced on 14 November 1984 in which he was granted the posthumous title of Servant of God. Pope Francis named him as Venerable on 16 June 2017.

== Life ==
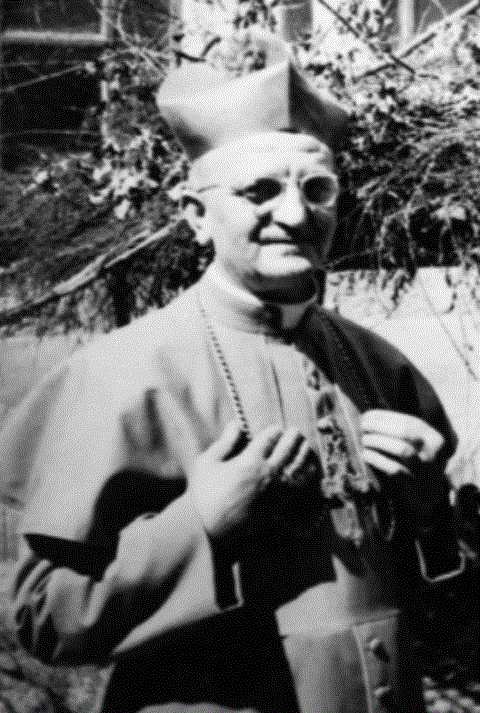
Castrillo in an undated photo.

Agostino Ernesto Castrillo was born in 1904 in Caserta as the third of eleven children.

At the age of fifteen – in 1919 after World War I – he assumed the habit of the Order of Friars Minor in the order's Apulia and Molise province of Saint Michael the Archangel. He commenced his philosophical and theological studies for the priesthood, and upon the completion of those studies was ordained as a priest in Molfetta on 11 June 1927, in the Santuario della Madonna dei Martiri.

Castrillo was appointed as a parish priest in Foggia and was assigned to the parish of "Gesú e Maria" in 1936. He remained in that position during the Second World War and would be stationed there until 1946. During his time in Foggia he became the spiritual director of the Pontifical Athenaeum Antonianum in Rome and was later made the Provincial Minister of the Apulia-Molise province of the Franciscans. The onslaught of the Second World War saw him provide material and spiritual assistance to victims.

Pope Pius XII appointed him on 17 September 1953 as the Bishop of San Marco Argentano Bisignano and Castrillo received his episcopal consecration in his Foggia parish from the Servant of God Fortunato Maria Farina. However he suffered incurable lung cancer not long after that forced him to his bed for thirteen months; of his condition he said to friends: "Do not pity me: I am happy to suffer! This is my responsibility as a bishop: to pray and suffer".

Castrillo died in Cosenza on 16 October 1955 due to his lung cancer.

== Beatification process ==
The beatification process commenced on 14 November 1984 – under Pope John Paul II – in which Castrillo was granted the posthumous title of Servant of God – the first official stage in the process. The ensuring diocesan process opened in 1995 and concluded its work in 1999 at which point the Congregation for the Causes of Saints validated the process in Rome in 2002.

The postulation sent the Positio to the C.C.S. in 2008 for the latter to commence their own investigation into the cause. Theologians advising them approved the cause on 27 October 2015. Pope Francis confirmed he lived a life of heroic virtue and named him as Venerable on 16 June 2017.

The current postulator assigned to the cause is Giovangiuseppe Califano.
