= Benjamin Taylor A Bell =

Canadian journalist (1861–1904)

Benjamin Taylor A Bell (2 July 1861 – 1 March 1904) was a Canadian sportsman, militia officer, journalist, editor, and publisher.

== Biography ==
The son of David Bell and Margaret Taylor, he was born in Edinburgh, Scotland and emigrated to Canada when his mother died.

Joining the 90th Winnipeg Rifles in 1883, he also began working as a clerk for the Canadian Pacific Railway. In 1884 while in Rat Portage (now Kenora), Ontario, he joined the Canadian volunteer contingent heading east to take part in the Gordon Relief Expedition. After returning to Canada in 1885, he was commissioned as a lieutenant in the 1st Battalion Prince of Wales’s Regiment of Volunteer Rifles of Montreal and later transferred to the 43rd Ottawa and Carleton Battalion of Rifles in Ottawa where he eventually became involved in the field of journalism with the Montreal Gazette.

Benjamin Bell worked as a journalist, editor and publisher. He became the editor of the Canadian Mining Review in 1887 and, henceforth, all his energies were devoted to the Canadian mining industry. Soon after, he became its publisher. He made important contributions to the mining industry through his journalism and other interests relating to mining.

On 18 February 1904, while taking his habitual shortcut to the Canadian Mining Review offices through an adjacent store, Bell walked through the wrong door in the store and fell 10 feet (3.0 m) down an elevator shaft. He died of his injuries on March 1.
