= Albert Newton Raub =

American educator (1840–1904)

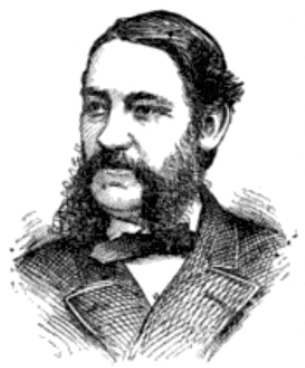
- Born: March 28, 1840; Lancaster County, Pennsylvania
- Died: February 23, 1904 (aged 63); Newark, Delaware
- Education: State Normal School; Princeton University; Lafayette College; Ursinus College
- Occupation: Educator

Albert Newton Raub, Ph.D., LL.D., (March 28, 1840 – February 23, 1904) was an American educator and the president of Delaware College (now the University of Delaware).

== Biography ==
Raub was born in Lancaster County, Pennsylvania on March 28, 1840, and lived on a farm until he was 17 years old, when he began teaching near his home. In 1860 he was graduated from the State Normal School at Millersville, Pennsylvania, and immediately thereafter was elected to the principalship of the Bedford (Pa.) Union School. He taught next at Cressona and Ashland, Pennsylvania, until 1866, when he was called to the chair of English literature, grammar, and rhetoric, in the State Normal School at Kutztown, Pennsylvania. In 1868 he left Kutztown for Lock Haven, Pennsylvania, where he held successively the positions of principal of public schools, city superintendent, and county superintendent of Clinton County. In 1877 he was chosen first principal of the Central State Normal School, which had been established at Lock Haven largely through his own personal efforts. From 1865 to 1885 he was prominent before the teachers' institutes of the state as a lecturer on the teaching of English. In 1885 he left Pennsylvania to assume the principalship of the academy at Newark, Delaware, from which position he was called in 1888 to the presidency of Delaware College, a position which made him ex-officio president of the state board of education.

For 18 years he was editor of the Educational News, and during the last few years of his life devoted himself mainly to the interests of the books of which he was the author, treating principally of the English language. He received the degree of Master of Arts from Princeton in 1867, doctor of philosophy from Lafayette College in 1879, and doctor of laws from Ursinus College in 1895.

He served as president of the Pennsylvania State Teachers' Association and was an active member of the National Educational Association from 1892. He died at his home in Newark, Delaware, on February 23, 1904.
