= Giovanni Zanni =

Italian footballer

Personal information
- Date of birth: February 19, 1904
- Place of birth: Omegna, Province of Verbano-Cusio-Ossola, Italy
- Date of death: 9 February 1974 (aged 69)
- Place of death: Omegna, Province of Verbano-Cusio-Ossola, Italy
- Position: Striker

Senior career*
Years	Team	Apps	(Gls)
1926–1929	Casale	78	(20)
1929–1930	Juventus	23	(6)
1930–1931	Lazio	4	(0)
1931–1932	Torres	30	(0)
1932–1934	Foligno		
1934–1935	Atalanta	27	(2)
1935–1936	Catanzaro		
1936–1938	Cusiana Omegna		
1938–1941	Omegna		
- * Club domestic league appearances and goals

Giovanni Zanni (19 February 1904 – 9 February 1974) was an Italian professional football player.
