= Abrey Kamoo =

American physician (1815–1904)

Abrey Kamoo (born Abbredalah Kaloss, alias Tommy Kamoo; January/February 1815 – February 21, 1904) (Note: According to the Los Angeles Herald, Kamoo died on February 22, 1904, at a Boston hospital. According to the Guides Gazette article, she died on "Sunday February 2, 1904" (which was actually a Tuesday), while attending an evening service at the People's Temple in Boston. According to The Washington Times and Zion's Herald, she died on Sunday, February 21, 1904, at the People's Temple.) was an American physician who was reportedly born in Tunisia. In 1862, during the American Civil War, she was said to have served in disguise as a Union Army drummer boy until her sex was discovered, and then to have served as an army nurse for the remainder of the conflict. No official government or military records or other accounts exist to corroborate her claims, however, and it is likely that many of the more fanciful parts of her life story were fabricated later in life and included in her obituaries.

== Biography ==
According to newspaper accounts at the time of her death, Abbredalah Kaloss was born in Tunis in 1815 as a triplet. Kaloss' father, Abdallah Kaloss, who was also a triplet, is said to have been a prominent merchant; her mother was of German descent. Kaloss received her Doctor of Medicine degree from the University of Heidelberg in the mid-1830s. During her college education, Kaloss dressed as a man, since the institution did not then admit women. It was during this period that she met her fiancé, Enrique (William) Kamoo, a graduate of the University of Cairo. According to one account, Kaloss was educated in Germany at the suggestion of United States Navy Commodore Matthew C. Perry, a family friend; according to another version, Perry met her after her return to Tunisia from Germany.

In 1838 Kaloss is said to have sailed with Commodore Perry to New Orleans, where she was reunited with Kamoo, who was working there as a doctor. Commodore Perry gave Kaloss away at her 1840 wedding to Kamoo. The couple established a hospital for black people in New Orleans. They would reportedly twice have triplets. However, only one of their children, a son named William, would live to adulthood. Enrique Kamoo died around 1859; William, the couple's last child, was posthumous, born in early 1860. According to one account, Enrique was shot to death during an argument about abolitionism; according to another account, he died of smallpox contracted during an outbreak.

When the American Civil War began, Kamoo desired to support the Union cause. Leaving her son, William, with friends, she traveled north. In 1862 Kamoo reportedly joined the Union Army in male disguise, using the name "Tommy Kamoo", first as a nurse and then as a drummer boy. Her sex was discovered after she was wounded in the nose at the Battle of Gettysburg; she then served as an army nurse for the rest of the war. Due to racial segregation she was only allowed to care for black soldiers.

After the war Kamoo reunited with her son in New Orleans. They moved to New York City, where Kamoo opened a practice. In 1875 Kamoo moved from New York to Boston, where she established a practice as a dermatologist in the city's South End. In 1885 she joined the congregation of the People's Temple in Boston.

Kamoo's son died of appendicitis in 1901. With her health weakened by multiple falls, Kamoo died in her seat while attending an evening service at the People's Temple on February 21, 1904, at the age of 89. (Note: According to the Zion's Herald obituary, Kamoo celebrated her 88th birthday three weeks before her death.) She and her son are buried at Boston's Mount Hope Cemetery. According to newspaper reports of her death, her 114-year-old father was living in Los Angeles with her two triplet brothers when she died.

== Veracity of claims ==
Kamoo's life story was told through a series of 1904 newspaper obituaries. There is little evidence to corroborate the stories included, and an analysis shows portions to be false or impossible. Aside from the fact that it is implausible that a then 48-year-old woman of African descent enlisted in the United States Army as a white "drummer boy," the records of the United States Army show that there was never an individual matching her purported alias, "Tommy (or Thomas) Kamoo," to serve during the war, nor was there a Kamoo who served as a nurse. Similarly, census records show no Kamoo living in New Orleans (or anywhere in Louisiana) in the antebellum period. Additionally, other aspects of Kamoo's claims are dubious: Commodore Perry was neither in Tunisia nor New Orleans in 1838 (and was a captain at the time), as he was instead stationed in New York during this period.
