= Heinrich Hergert =

German footballer

Personal information
- Full name: Heinrich Hergert
- Date of birth: 21 February 1904
- Place of birth: Pirmasens, Germany
- Date of death: 18 September 1949 (aged 45)
- Position: Midfielder

Senior career*
Years	Team	Apps	(Gls)
1925–1938	FK Pirmasens		
1938–1939	1. FC Kaiserslautern		

International career
1930–1933	Germany	5	(0)
- * Club domestic league appearances and goals

Heinrich Hergert (21 February 1904 – 18 September 1949) was a German international footballer who played for FK Pirmasens and 1. FC Kaiserslautern.
