= Yankee Division =

Yankee Division may refer to:

- 26th Infantry Division (United States), former infantry division in the United States Army
- 26th Maneuver Enhancement Brigade, current unit in the Massachusetts National Guard
- The Yankee Division March, World War I march for piano
- Hudson Armory, former Massachusetts Army National Guard armory
- Massachusetts Route 128, nicknamed Yankee Division Highway
- The Yankee Division March, song by Kanonenfieber feat. Trevor Strnad
