= 101st Infantry Regiment (United States) =

101st Infantry Regiment (9th Massachusetts)
- Active: 1861–1864. 1898-1992
- Country: United States
- Branch: Massachusetts Army National Guard
- Type: Infantry
- Size: Regiment
- Motto: Semper Paratus
- Engagements: American Civil War; Battle of Gaines's Mill, Battle of Malvern Hill, Battle of Fredericksburg, Battle of Chancellorsville, Battle of Gettysburg, Battle of Spotsylvania, Battle of Manassas, Battle of Antietam.; Spanish–American War; Cuban Campaign; World War I; German spring offensive, Third Battle of the Aisne, Second Battle of the Marne, Battle of Saint-Mihiel, Meuse-Argonne Offensive.; World War II; Lorraine Campaign, Battle of Metz, Battle of the Bulge, Push to the Rhine, Actions across the Rhine.

The 101st Infantry Regiment was a formation of the United States Army, Massachusetts Army National Guard. Its history dates back to the American Civil War, and continued through the Spanish–American War, World War I, and World War II before being consolidated with Massachusetts' 182nd Infantry Regiment in 1992; the spirit of the 101st and its history live on in the 182nd Infantry and the 26th Infantry Brigade Combat Team of the Massachusetts Army National Guard.

== Civil War ==
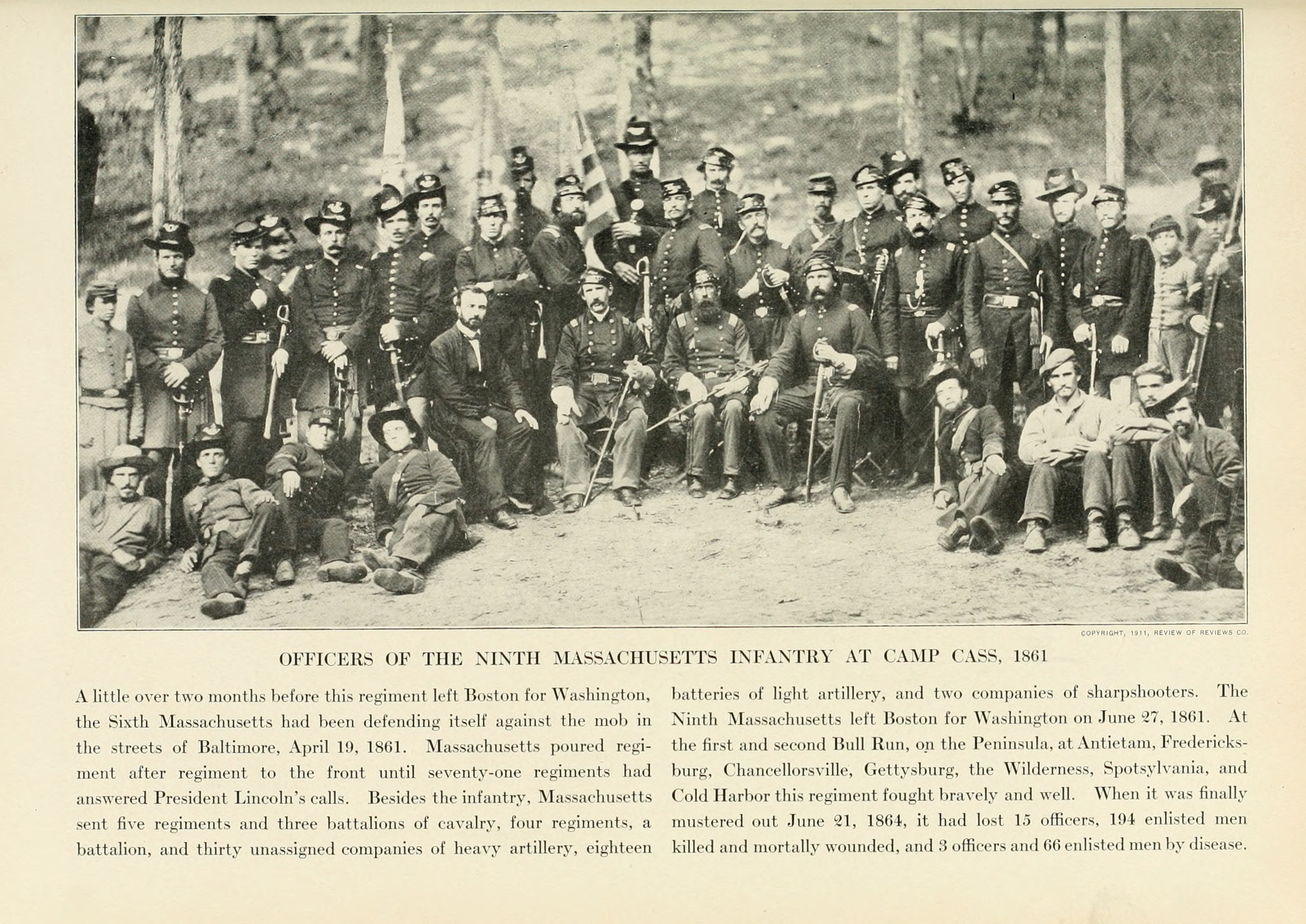
9th Regiment Massachusetts Volunteer Infantry in 1861

Originally, the 101st Regiment was the 9th Regiment Massachusetts Volunteer Infantry, the "Fighting Ninth," and it was first mustered into federal service on 20 June 1861. Many of the men and officers were Irish immigrants, and under the leadership of Colonel Thomas Cass, the Massachusetts soldiers fought in ten major engagements during the war. The regiment was initially blooded at the Battle of Gaines's Mill and again at the Battle of Malvern Hill. The Fighting Ninth went on to battle the Confederates at the Battle of Second Manassas, where the Union Army was soundly defeated, and at the Battle of Antietam, where a slight Union victory prompted Abraham Lincoln to sign the Emancipation Proclamation. The 9th Massachusetts was then heavily engaged in two subsequent Union defeats; the Battle of Fredericksburg and the Battle of Chancellorsville before taking part in the momentous Battle of Gettysburg, where Union forces delivered a decisive victory against the Confederates. As a part of General Ulysses Grant's army, the 9th fought at the Battle of Spotsylvania as part of the Overland Campaign. Near the infamous Bloody Angle, the 9th marched on Laurel Hill and the regimental commander, COL Guiney was severely wounded, and the exhausted regiment was withdrawn. It was finally mustered out of service on 21 June 1864 in Boston after seeing much action.

== Post Civil War ==
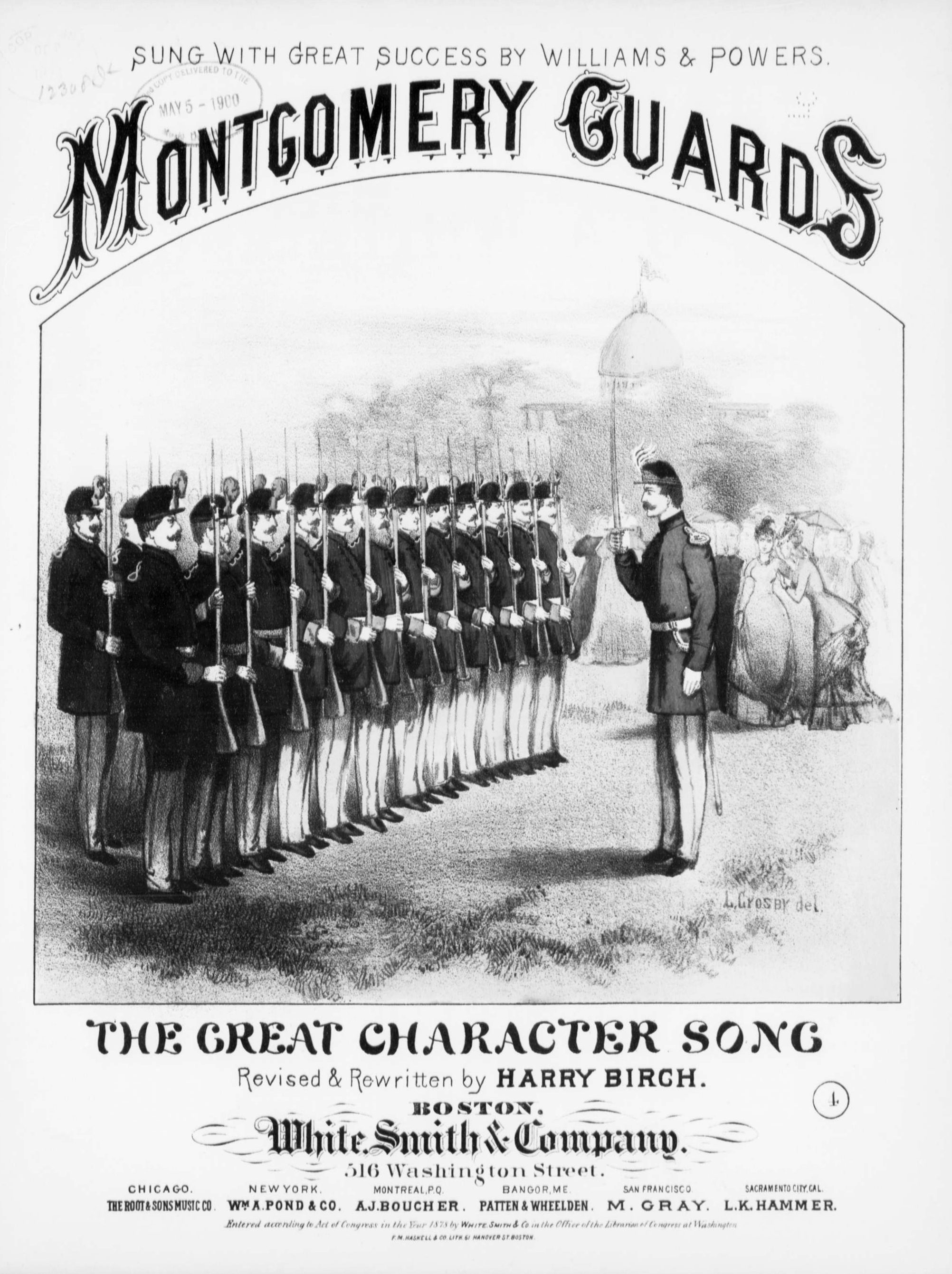
"Montgomery Guards" sheet music, 1878-the Montgomery Guards were Company I of the 9th Regiment, Massachusetts Volunteer Militia

The 9th Massachusetts Volunteer Infantry Regiment was reorganized as the 9th Regiment M.V.M. on 18 May 1866. Reorganized 9 July 1876 as 9th Battalion of infantry. Expanded and redesignated 9th Regiment 3 December 1878.

== Spanish–American War ==
On 4 May 1898, the 9th Massachusetts was called up again under the command of Colonel Lawrence J. Logan, and was quickly sent to Santiago, Cuba. Spanish forces had surrendered before the 9th could engage in any major combat roles, and the majority of the regiment's casualties were the result of disease, particularly yellow fever. At this point the regiment was still a unit of the Massachusetts Volunteer Militia, but in 1907, in response to the Militia Act of 1903, it became a part of the Massachusetts National Guard. In this role it and other units served both the nation, as an Army reserve, and the state, in domestic crises like the Great Chelsea Fire of 1908. The regiment, and units within it, became a source of civic pride in Boston, celebrated for example in music like "101st Regiment U. S. A." (by Bert Potter) and "Battery A March."

== World War I ==
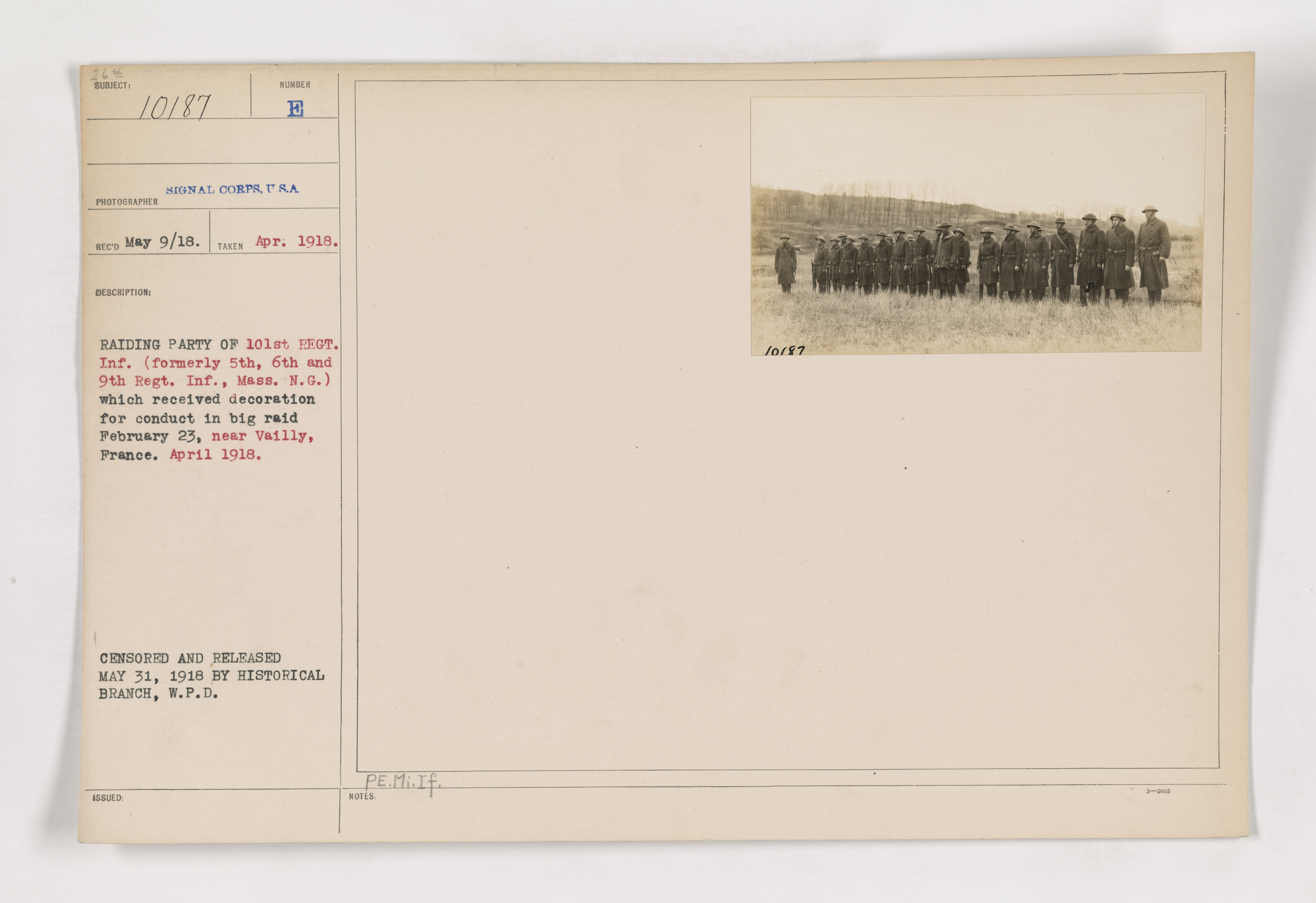
A raiding party of the 101st Infantry, decorated for the raid near Vailly on 23 February 1918.

The 9th Massachusetts had been protecting the Mexico–United States border near El Paso, Texas from 18 June-22 November 1916, and was prepared for other such mobilizations, which would prove to be vital in April 1917, when the United States joined the Allied Powers during the First World War. In order to prepare the regiment for service, it was redesignated the 101st Infantry Regiment, and was assigned to the 51st Infantry Brigade of the 26th Infantry Division, the "Yankee Division." The 102nd Infantry Regiment was also assigned to the 51st Brigade. The regiment mustered in its new form on 22 August 1917 in Framingham, Massachusetts and arrived in France in September. It was the first Army National Guard unit of the American Expeditionary Force to arrive in France, and was also the first National Guard unit to enter frontline combat. Alongside the French Army, the 101st made a raid into German lines on 23 February 1918, marking the first time an American unit had launched a raid in the war. Commanded by Edward Lawrence Logan, the 26th Division, including the 101st Regiment, engaged the Germans in numerous battles along the Western Front including; the 1918 German spring offensive, the Third Battle of the Aisne, the Second Battle of the Marne, the Battle of Saint-Mihiel, and the massive Meuse-Argonne Offensive. It was here in the Meuse-Argonne Offensive that Private First Class Michael J. Perkins from Boston, earned the Medal of Honor. While advancing with D Company, 101st Infantry, he single-handedly neutralized a fortified pillbox with grenades, and captured 25 prisoners and 7 machine guns with his trench knife. The bloodied regiment was mustered out of service in April 1919 at Camp Devens.

== Interwar period ==
Per the terms of the National Defense Act of 1920, the 101st Infantry was reconstituted in the National Guard in 1921, assigned to the 26th Division, and allotted to the state of Massachusetts. It was reorganized on 30 September 1921 by redesignation of the 9th Infantry, Massachusetts National Guard (organized 1919–20; headquarters organized 20 January 1921 and federally recognized at Boston, Massachusetts) as the 101st Infantry. Several companies were called up to perform hurricane relief at Cape Cod in September 1938. The regiment conducted annual summer training most years at Camp Devens, Massachusetts, 1921–34, and at the Massachusetts Military Reservation at Falmouth, Massachusetts, 1936-38.

== World War II ==
While Germany and Fascist Italy were in the process of conquering most of Europe in 1939 and 1940, and the Empire of Japan grabbing territory in the Pacific and China, the United States felt unprepared in the event war was necessary to combat the Axis powers and began mobilizing its army in response. The Selective Training and Service Act of 1940 which allowed the government to draft US citizens, was passed, and all available National Guard divisions were inducted into federal service within a year. On 16 January 1941 the 26th Division, the "Yankee Division," was inducted, which included the 101st Infantry Regiment. 1,500 new recruits joined the regiment for training at Camp Edwards, Massachusetts and for the Carolina Maneuvers. The 101st was brought to full strength in February 1943 and departed for Europe on 27 August 1944. The regiment arrived in Cherbourg, France on 7 September 1944 and prepared for combat operations.

=== Arracourt and Lorraine ===
The combat action of the Regiment is marked by aggressiveness. From the beginning, the infantrymen of the regiment were seldom passive. Under the leadership of Col. Walter T. Scott, the 101st worked, attacked, and maneuvered with dexterity and intensity. The 26th Division relieved the 4th Armored Division on 7 October 1944, and the 101st Regiment began offensive operations 8 November 1944. They attacked the Germans near Arracourt, and the regiment's objective was Hill 310. After a thunderous artillery barrage, the 2nd Battalion (2-101) advanced on the hill and the 1st (1-101) and 3rd (3-101) Battalions covered the flanks by engaging Germans elsewhere. In this action, the Regiment advanced to the town of Moyenvic and captured 524 prisoners.

On 12 November 3-101 drove off an enemy counterattack coming from Wuisse, and on 13 November the Regiment received 759 replacements. With their ranks replenished, the Regiment seized Bourgaltroff, near Marimont. On 19 November, the GIs attacked through water waist deep on a general line north and south through Bergelstroff. 3-101 received the Distinguished Unit Citation for its actions from 18 to 21 November 1944. (WD GO 109-45)

LTC Lyons, C. O. of 2-101, was seriously wounded on that day. On 20 November 1-101 under LTC Lawrence M. Kirk captured Lohr and Innsviller and 3-101 under LTC James N. Peale, Jr. captured Torcheville. 1-101 captured Altweiller on 27 November. On 1 December, in coordination with the 4th Armored Division, the 101st Infantry attacked Sarre-Union. 1-101 seized high ground to the east, and the city fell to the 101st Infantry on 3 December. The Regiment was relieved at Rohrbach on 10 December by the 87th Infantry Division.

=== Metz ===
While moving through Metz, 2-101 was ordered to contain the German garrison at Fort Jeanne d'Arc and it relieved the elements of the 345th Infantry Regiment. On 11 December, 1-101 joined the containment force. On 13 December, the German garrison surrendered and the troops of the 101st Infantry enjoyed much deserved R&R in Metz. However, on 19 December the Regiment was called up again to help stop a German breakthrough in Belgium and Luxembourg.

=== Battle of the Bulge ===
On 20 December the regiment was transported by motor vehicle to Luxembourg. The movement of 26th Division was the initial effort made by the Third Army to defend the southern flank of the German penetration. The Battle of the Bulge was destined to be one of the fiercest and most trying of all for the 101st Infantry. Task Force Dunham, led by CPT Leland Dunham, made first contact with the Germans on 23 December. The enemy they faced were Fallschirmjäger troops who used captured American equipment against them. The days on the front were long, and the cold took as much of a toll on the men as the Germans. On 24 December, 2-101 captured Rambrouch and Koetschette in time for the regiment to spend a quiet Christmas Eve. On 25 December, the 101st Infantry relieved the 328th Infantry (also a part of the 26th Infantry Division), and 2-101 quickly seized Arsdorf.

Here, they encountered the Gross Deutschland Division, and drove them away from the Sure River after COL Scott personally led the attack across the water in a makeshift boat. The 1-101 and 3-101 joined at the town of Liefrange after repelling enemy counterattacks. On 28 December 1-101 took Bavigne and 2-101 took Mecher-Dunkrodt. The regiment was forced to fight against fierce opposition on Hill 490 and the Mon Shuman crossroads, and constant battle exhausted the men. On 31 December, 3-101 captured the Bavigne-Wiltz Road, but was forced to retreat on 1 January 1945. On 9 January, the 101st moved to reinforce the advancing 35th Infantry Division and fought with the German 5th Parachute Division in order to break through "the Bulge" near Bastogne. On the morning of 9 January, 3-101 attacked while 2-101 advanced alongside the 90th Infantry Division. The determined drive to break the enemy line succeeded. On 21 January the Regiment attacked the enemy supply center of Wiltz. 1-101, led by LTC Albert L. Gramm took the city, with 2-101 and 3-101 attacking in the vicinity of Noertrange. After continuing through Wiltz, the 101st Regiment encountered German mine fields, Schumines, and booby trapped enemy bodies. Nevertheless, the attack moved swiftly to Selscheid. On 24 January, the regiment crossed the Clerf River under heavy fire, and after seizing its objective, Clervaux, the 101st Infantry, along with the entire 26th Division, concluded its combat action in the Ardennes region. It was a tough fight, and one Yankee soldier called it, "our Valley Forge."

=== Saarlautern ===
On 28 January 1945, the 101st Infantry Regiment acted as the 26th Infantry Division reserve in the area of Falck, France. On 23 February, the 101st relieved the 328th Infantry Regiment and held a bridgehead over the Saar River near Saarlautern. Skirmishing with the enemy and sending combat patrols to harass German positions was commonplace in the cities of Saarlautern and Fraulautern. The bridgehead was held until the regiment was relieved on 8 March 1945, and moved to Saarburg.

=== Push to the Rhine ===
On 13 March, the XX Corps attacked along a broad front and the 101st Infantry began its advance on 15 March. On 17 March, 1-101 captured Bratdorf. As organized German resistance crumbled, COL Scott ordered the formation of the Saint Patrick's task force, which was led by MAJ Joseph P. Boucher. The task force consisted of "A" Company, 1-101 Infantry, one platoon of the 26th Reconnaissance Troop, one platoon of 818th Tank Destroyers, one platoon 778th Tank Battalion, one platoon of Regimental Antitank Company, and one squad from the Antitank mine platoon. Spearheading the 101st Infantry drive, Task Force St. Patrick reached Buprich on the night of 17 March and secured a bridgehead across the Prims River. Soon, the bridge was secured by the rest of the regiment. By 18 March 901 POWs had been captured. Telephone communications were unavailable due to the nature of the rapid advance, and control was maintained entirely by use of radio. On 19 March, Task Force St. Patrick, seized Ottweiler along with troops from the 104th Infantry. The advance continued east with all three battalions of the regiment attacking simultaneously. 3-101 was molded into a motorized infantry battalion to increase its speed in raids and counterattacks. The pursuit of the enemy was quick, and the regiment only suffered light casualties. By 25 March 1945, the entire Regiment was across the Rhine River, and into central Germany, near Wiesbaden.

=== East of the Rhine ===
The night of 25 March, the 101st pushed east and contact with the enemy was maintained throughout their rapid advance. 2-101 and 3-101 crossed the Main River in assault boats and were followed by 1-101. On Easter Sunday, 1 April 1945, 1-101 attacked the Germans at Fulda while 2-101 and 3-101 cleared out the nearby woods to the north and northeast. Fulda was cleared on 3 April, and within the next two days, 16 German officers and 1,307 enlisted men surrendered to the 101st Infantry (1,000 of the prisoners were Hungarian). The 101st Regiment pushed east, and reached Sonneberg, Germany on 12 April. COL Scott telephoned the most senior man in the town and informed him that the city had been surrounded, and soon white flags arose from town, and all three 101st battalions captured it without firing a shot. In order to protect the 26th Division's left flank, the 101st moved to Cham, where MAJ Joseph Boucher, CO of 1-101 was killed in an enemy ambush. The final action of the 101st Infantry was made in a drive on Passau, a key city on the Danube River. On 4 May, the 101st crossed into Austria, and then moved into Czechoslovakia. On 7 May 1945, Wehrmacht Major General Von Butler surrendered the whole German 85th Corps to the regiment, a total of 5,000 men. From 7 May to 9 May, over 25,000 prisoners were captured by the 101st Infantry Regiment, as the Germans rapidly fled from the Russians to the east.

== Post WWII ==
The 101st Infantry continued to serve in the Massachusetts National Guard as part of the 26th Infantry Division. Various battalions and companies remained active until 1 September 1992, when the 1st Battalion, 101st Infantry, the sole active unit of the regiment, was consolidated with the 1st Battalion, 182nd Infantry Regiment.
