= General Foote =

General Foote may refer to:

- Alfred F. Foote (1878–1965), Massachusetts National Guard major general
- Henry Bowreman Foote (1904–1993), British Army major general
- Pat Foote (born 1930), U.S. Army brigadier general
- Stephen Miller Foote (1859–1919), U.S. Army brigadier general

== See also ==
- Cecil Foott (1876–1942), Australian Army brigadier general
