= 26th Infantry Division (United States) =

Inactive US Army formation

- 26th Infantry Division shoulder sleeve insignia
- Active: 18 July 1917–3 May 1919; 21 March 1923–29 December 1945; 13 November 1946–1 September 1993
- Country: United States
- Branch: United States Army
- Type: Infantry
- Role: Light infantry
- Size: Division
- Nickname: "Yankee Division"
- Engagements: World War I; Champagne-Marne; Aisne-Marne; St. Mihiel; Meuse-Argonne; Ile de France 1918; Lorraine 1918; World War II; Northern France; Rhineland; Ardennes-Alsace; Central Europe

Commanders
- Notable commanders: Maj. Gen. Clarence Ransom Edwards; Lt. Gen. Edward L. Logan

Insignia
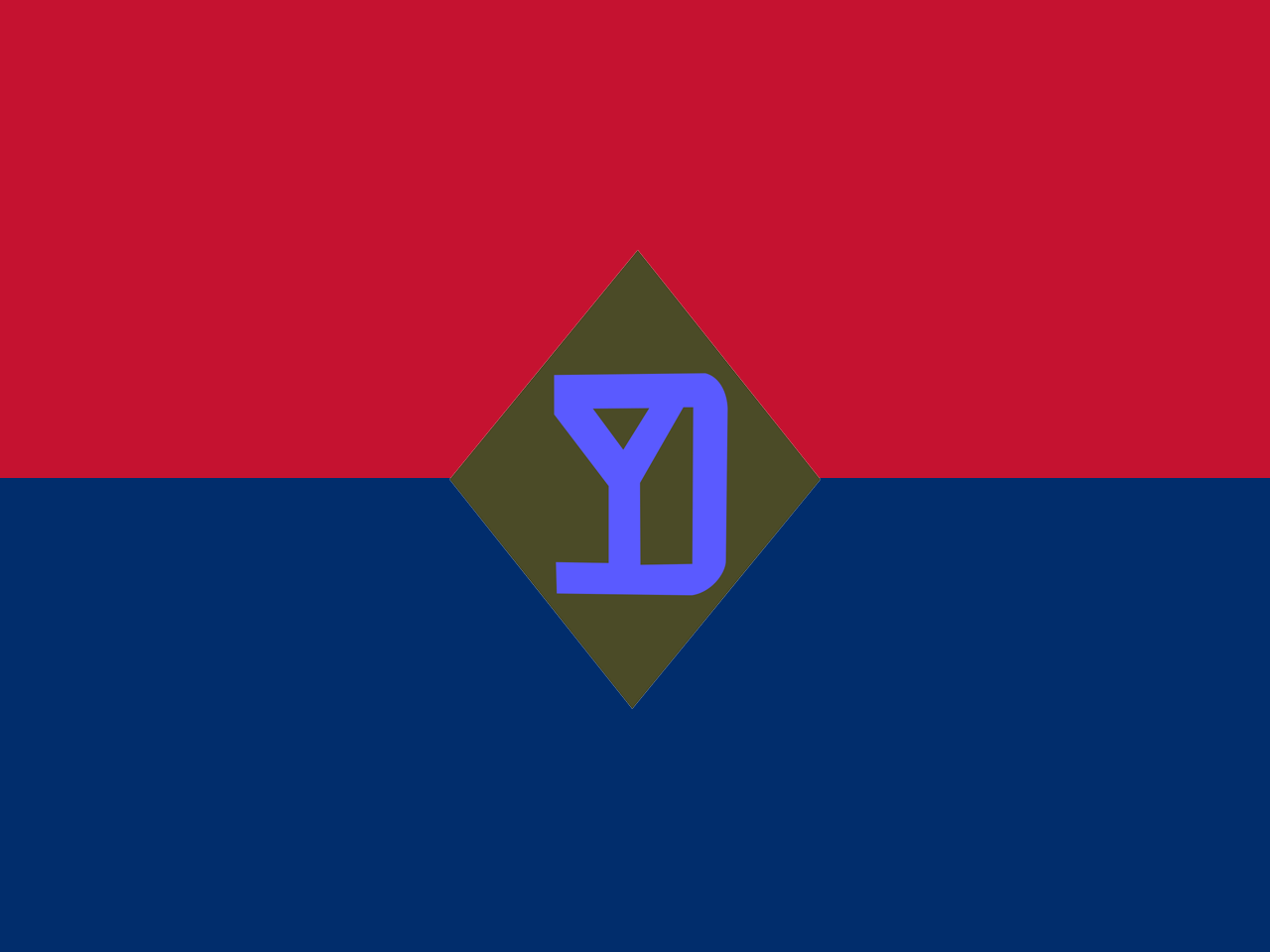
- Flag of the United States Army 26th Infantry Division

The 26th Infantry Division was an infantry division of the United States Army. A major formation of the Massachusetts Army National Guard, it was based in Boston, Massachusetts for most of its history. Today, the division's heritage is carried on by the 26th Maneuver Enhancement Brigade.

Formed on 18 July 1917 and activated 22 August 1917 at Camp Edwards, Massachusetts, consisting of units from the New England area, the division's commander selected the nickname "Yankee Division" to highlight the division's geographic makeup. Sent to Europe in World War I as part of the American Expeditionary Forces, the division saw extensive combat in France. Sent to Europe once again for World War II, the division again fought through France, advancing into Germany and liberating the Gusen concentration camp before the end of the war.

Following the end of World War II, the division remained as an active command in the National Guard, gradually expanding its command to contain units from other divisions which had been consolidated. However, the division was never called up to support any major contingencies or see major combat, and was eventually deactivated in 1993, reorganized as a brigade under the 29th Infantry Division.

== History ==
=== World War I ===
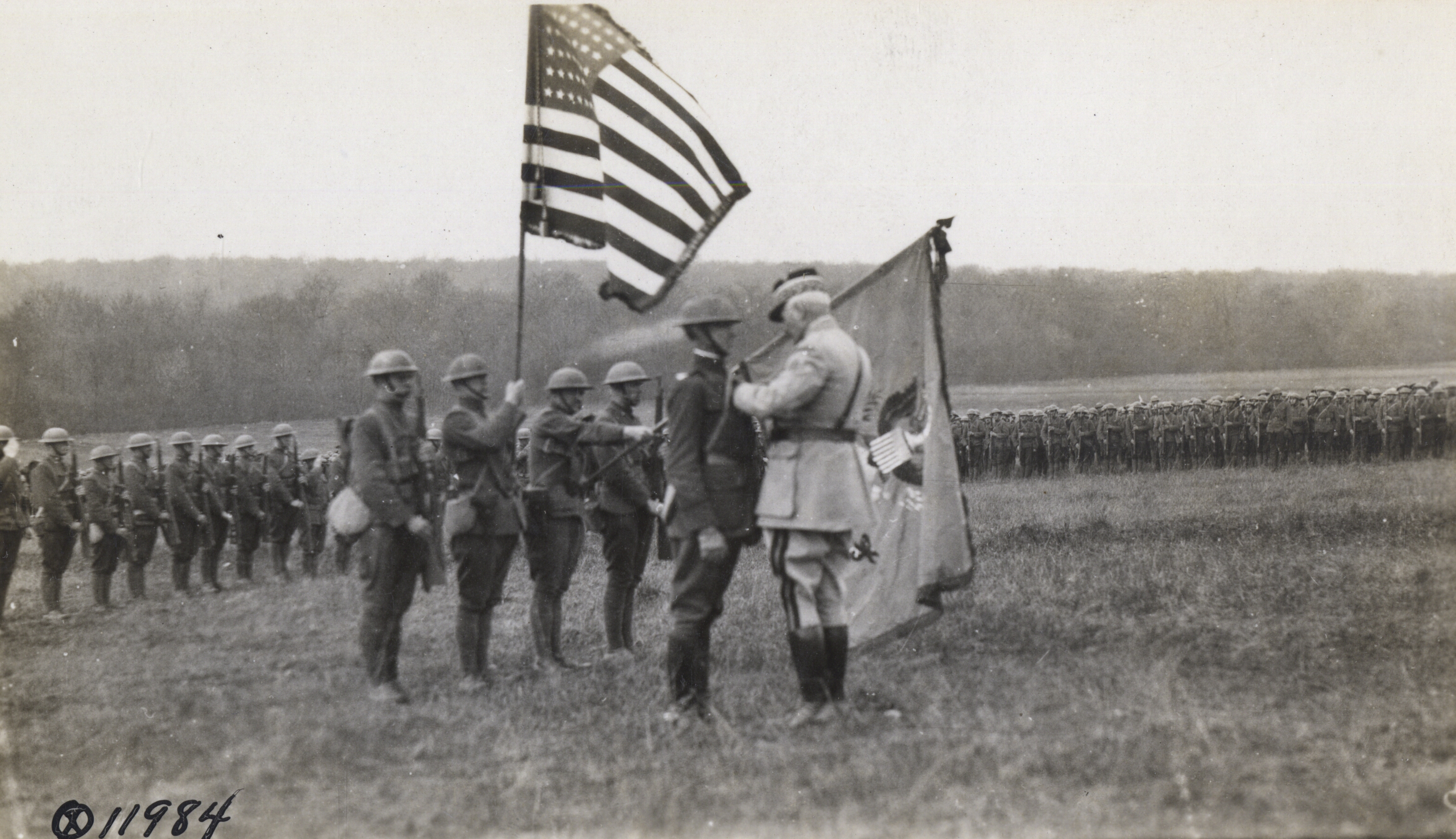
Decoration of regimental colors by General Passaga, 32nd French Army Corps.

==== WWI division organization ====
The 26th Infantry Division was first constituted on 18 July 1917, three months after the American entry into World War I, as the 26th Division. It was formally activated on 22 August of that year in Boston, Massachusetts, and it was celebrated by Boston writers and by composers in pieces such as "The Yankee Division March" and "Battery A March." Shortly after that, the division commander, Major General C. R. Edwards, called a press conference to determine a nickname for the newly formed division. Edwards decided to settle on the suggestion of "Yankee Division" since all of the subordinate units of the division were from the New England states of Maine, Massachusetts, New Hampshire, Rhode Island, Connecticut, and Vermont. Shortly thereafter, the division approved a shoulder sleeve insignia with a "YD" monogram to reflect this.

- Headquarters, 26th Division
- 51st Infantry Brigade
  - 101st Infantry Regiment (9th Massachusetts Infantry, 175 men from 6th Massachusetts Infantry, and 1,400 men from 5th Massachusetts Infantry)
  - 102nd Infantry Regiment (2nd Connecticut Infantry, 1,617 men from 1st Connecticut Infantry, 50 men from 1st Vermont Infantry, and 100 men from 6th Massachusetts Infantry)
  - 102nd Machine Gun Battalion (Squadron, Massachusetts Cavalry less Troop B, and 216 men from 1st Vermont Infantry)
- 52nd Infantry Brigade
  - 103rd Infantry Regiment (2nd Maine Infantry 1,630 men from 1st New Hampshire Infantry, and detachments from Companies F, H, K, and M, 8th Massachusetts Infantry)
  - 104th Infantry Regiment (812 men from 6th Massachusetts Infantry, 812 men from 8th Massachusetts Infantry, 2nd Massachusetts Infantry, and detachments from Companies F, H, K, and M, 8th Massachusetts Infantry)
  - 103rd Machine Gun Battalion (Squadron, Rhode Island Cavalry less Troops B and M, Separate Machine Gun Troop, New Hampshire Cavalry, 232 men from 1st Vermont Infantry)
- 51st Field Artillery Brigade
  - 101st Field Artillery Regiment (75 mm) (1st Massachusetts F.A. and 180 men from New England Coast Artillery)
  - 102nd Field Artillery Regiment (75 mm) (2nd Massachusetts F.A. and 150 men from New England Coast Artillery)
  - 103rd Field Artillery Regiment (155 mm) (Battery A, New Hampshire F.A., three batteries Rhode Island F.A., two batteries Connecticut F.A., Troop M, Rhode Island Squadron of Cavalry, and detachment from New England Coast Artillery)
  - 101st Trench Mortar Battery (detachments of 1st Maine F.A.)
- 101st Machine Gun Battalion (Squadron, Connecticut Cavalry and 196 men from 1st Vermont Infantry)
- 101st Engineer Regiment (1st Massachusetts Engineers, 100 men from 1st Maine F.A., 479 men from New England Coast Artillery)
- 101st Field Signal Battalion (1st Massachusetts Field Signal Battalion)
- Headquarters Troop, 26th Division (Troop B, Massachusetts Cavalry)
- 101st Train Headquarters and Military Police (326 men from 6th Massachusetts Infantry)
  - 101st Ammunition Train (713 men from 1st Vermont Infantry, 240 men from Massachusetts Coast Artillery)
  - 101st Supply Train (Troop B, Rhode Island Cavalry, 364 men from 8th Massachusetts Infantry, and 62 men from Company M, 6th Massachusetts Infantry)
  - 101st Engineer Train (82 men from 6th Massachusetts Infantry)
  - 101st Sanitary Train
    - 101st, 102nd, 103rd, and 104th Ambulance Companies and Field Hospitals (1st and 2nd Massachusetts Ambulance Companies, 1st and 2nd Massachusetts Field Hospitals, 1st Connecticut Field Hospital, 1st Rhode Island Ambulance Company, 1st New Hampshire Field Hospital)

==== Overseas ====
On 21 September 1917, the division arrived at Saint-Nazaire, France. It was the second division of the American Expeditionary Forces (AEF) to arrive on the Western Front at the time, and the first division wholly organized in the United States, joining the 1st Division, which had arrived in June. Two additional divisions completed the first wave of American troop deployment, with the 2nd Division being formed in France and the 42nd Division arriving at St. Nazaire on 29 October. The 26th Division immediately moved to Neufchâteau for training, as most of the division's soldiers were raw recruits, new to military service. Because of this, much of the division's force was trained by the experienced French forces. It trained extensively with the other three US divisions, organized as the U.S. I Corps in January 1918, before being moved into a quiet sector of the trenches in February.

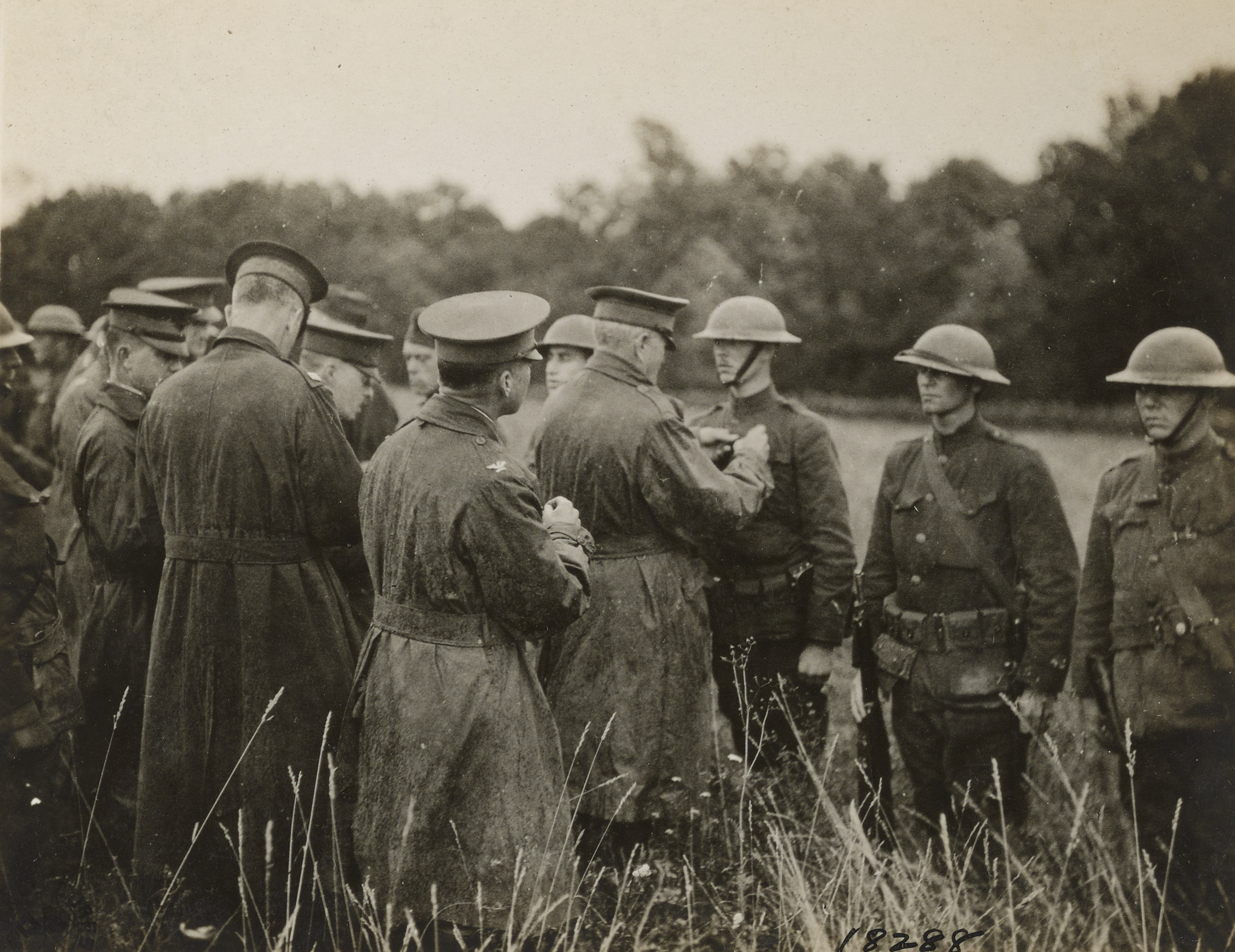
Men of various arms of the 26th Division being decorated by General John J. Pershing, Commander-in-Chief of the AEF, for holding the Hun at Apremont, La Foret, France, pictured here on July 12, 1918.

The 26th Infantry Division remained in a relatively quiet region of the lines along the Chemin des Dames for several months before it relieved the 1st Division near Saint-Mihiel on 3 April. The line here taken over extended from the vicinity of Apremont, on the west, in front of Xivray-Marvoisin, Seicheprey, and Bois de Remieres, as far as the Bois de Jury, on the right, where the French line joined the American line. Division Headquarters were at Boucq.

The stay of the division in this sector was marked by several serious encounters with the enemy, where considerable forces were engaged. There were furthermore almost nightly encounters between patrols or ambush parties, and the harassing fire of the artillery on both sides was very active.

On 10, 12 and 13 April, the lines held by the 104th Infantry in Bois Brule (near Apremont), and by the French to the left, were heavily attacked by the Germans. At first the enemy secured a foothold in some advanced trenches which were not strongly held, but sturdy counterattacks succeeded in driving the enemy out with serious losses, and the line was entirely re-established.

In late April, German infantry conducted a raid on positions of the 26th Division, one of the first attacks on Americans during the war. At 0400 on 20 April, German field artillery bombarded the 102nd Infantry's positions near Seicheprey before German Stormtroopers (German: Stoßtruppen) moved against the village. The artillery box barrage, continuing 36 hours, isolated American units. The Germans overwhelmed a machine gun company and two infantry companies of the 102nd and temporarily breached the trenches before elements of the division rallied and recaptured the village. The Germans withdrew before the division could counterattack but inflicted 634 casualties, including 80 killed, 424 wounded, and 130 captured, while losing over 600 men, including 150 killed of their own. Similar raids struck the 101st infantry at Flirey on 27 May, and the 103rd Infantry at Xivray-et-Marvoisin on 16 June, but were repulsed. The 26th Division was relieved by the 82nd Division on 28 June, moved by train to Meaux, and entered the line again northwest of Chateau Thierry, relieving the 2nd Division on 5 July.

As the size of the AEF grew, the division was placed under command of I Corps in July. When the Aisne-Marne campaign began shortly thereafter, the division, under I Corps was placed under command of the French Sixth Army protecting its east flank. When the offensive began, the division advanced up the spine of the Marne salient for several weeks, pushing through Belleau Wood, moving 10 miles from 18 to 25 July. On 12 August it was pulled from the lines near Toul to prepare for the next offensive. The division was then a part of the offensive at Saint-Mihiel, during the Battle of Saint-Mihiel. The division then moved in position for the last major offensive of the war, at Meuse-Argonne. This campaign was the last of the war, as an armistice was signed shortly thereafter. During World War I the 26th Division spent 210 days in combat, and suffered 1,587 killed in action and 12,077 wounded in action. The division returned to the United States and was demobilized on 3 May 1919 at Camp Devens, Massachusetts.

=== Interwar period ===
In accordance with the National Defense Act of 1920, the 26th Division was initially allotted as an all-Massachusetts unit and assigned to the I Corps in 1921; the newly constituted 43rd Division, made up of units from Connecticut, Maine, Rhode Island, and Vermont, assumed control over some units that had been part of the 26th Division in World War I. The 26th Division headquarters was reorganized and federally recognized on 21 March 1923 in Boston. The physical headquarters was initially located at the Massachusetts State House, and relocated to the Commonwealth Armory in February 1931. The division's mobilization training center was originally Camp Devens, Massachusetts, and was changed to Camp Jackson (designated Fort Jackson in 1940), South Carolina, in 1939. The division conducted annual training most years at Camp Devens or the Massachusetts Military Reservation (designated Camp Edwards in 1931) at Falmouth. The division staff conducted command post exercises (CPXs) and staff training concurrent with the annual summer training camps. In some years, the division staff participated in First Corps Area or First Army CPXs such as those in 1931 and 1934, at Camp Dix, New Jersey. In 1935, 1939, and 1940, the division participated in the First Army maneuvers at Pine Camp, Plattsburg, and Canton, New York, respectively. In addition to the summer training, most of the division was called up for emergency relief duties in March 1929 when the Connecticut and Merrimac Rivers severely flooded their respective valleys. The division was called up again in September 1938 for relief duties in response to a hurricane that came ashore at Buzzards Bay and the concurrent flooding of the Merrimac and Housatonic Rivers. The division was relieved from the I Corps on 30 December 1940 and assigned to the VI Corps. It was inducted into federal service at home stations on 16 January 1941, but instead of Fort Jackson, it moved to Camp Edwards, where it arrived on 21 January 1941. After basic training, the 26th Division participated in the Carolina Maneuvers in October–November 1941.

On 1 April 1939 the batteries of the 101st Ammunition Train were reorganized and redesignated as Troops A and F, 121st Quartermaster Squadron, 21st Cavalry Division, with the train headquarters disbanded in an inactive status on 1 July 1940. In October 1940, the 110th Cavalry Regiment of the Massachusetts National Guard was converted into the 180th Field Artillery Regiment, replacing the 172nd Field Artillery Regiment in the division.

=== World War II ===
==== WWII division organization ====
===== Square division =====
On 16 January 1941, the 26th Division was inducted into federal service at home stations and then assembled at Camp Edwards in Massachusetts. At the time the division still retained its World War I square organization and consisted of the following units.

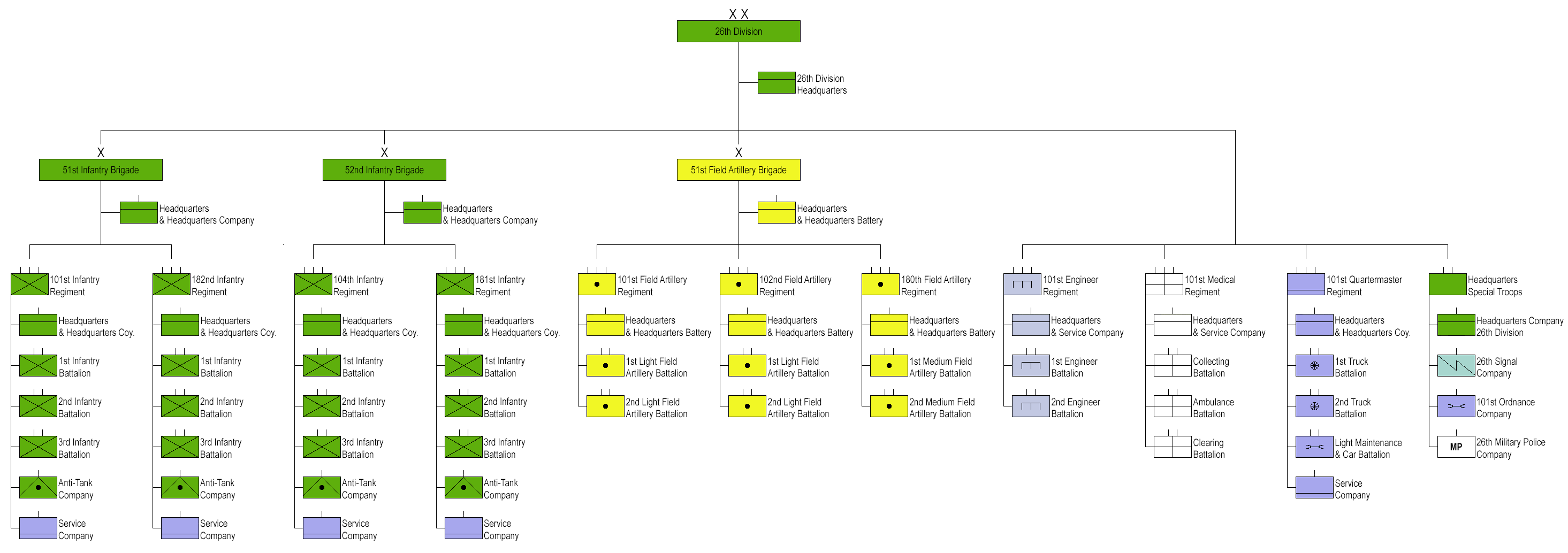
26th Division square organization (click to enlarge)

- 26th Division, in Boston (MA)
  - 26th Division Headquarters, in Boston (MA)
  - 51st Infantry Brigade, in Quincy (MA)
    - Headquarters and Headquarters Company, in Quincy (MA)
    - 101st Infantry Regiment, in Boston (MA)
      - Headquarters and Headquarters Company
      - 3× Infantry battalions
        - each battalion consists of: 1× Headquarters and Headquarters Detachment, 3× Rifle companies, 1× Weapons Company
      - Anti-Tank Company (M3 37mm Anti-Tank guns)
      - Service Company
    - 182nd Infantry Regiment, in Charlestown (MA)
      - same organization as 101st Infantry Regiment
  - 52nd Infantry Brigade, in Worcester (MA)
    - Headquarters and Headquarters Company, in Worcester (MA)
    - 104th Infantry Regiment, in Springfield (MA)
      - same organization as 101st Infantry Regiment
    - 181st Infantry Regiment, in Worcester (MA)
      - same organization as 101st Infantry Regiment
  - 51st Field Artillery Brigade, in Allston (MA)
    - Headquarters and Headquarters Battery, in Allston (MA)
    - 101st Field Artillery Regiment, in Allston (MA)
      - Headquarters and Headquarters Battery
      - 2× Light Field Artillery battalions
        - Headquarters and Headquarters Battery
        - 3× Howitzer batteries (M1897 75mm field guns), replaced by M2 105mm towed howitzers in 1941)
        - Service Battery
    - 102nd Field Artillery Regiment, in Salem (MA)
      - same organization as 101st Field Artillery Regiment
    - 180th Field Artillery Regiment, in Boston (MA)
      - Headquarters and Headquarters Battery
      - 2× Medium Field Artillery battalions
        - Headquarters and Headquarters Battery
        - 3× Howitzer batteries (M1918 155mm towed howitzers, replaced by M1 155mm towed howitzers in 1941)
        - Anti-Tank Battery (M1897 75mm anti-tank guns)
        - Service Battery
  - 101st Engineer Regiment, in Cambridge (MA)
    - Headquarters and Headquarters and Service Company
    - 2× Engineer battalions
      - each battalion consists of: 1× Headquarters, 3× Engineer companies
  - 101st Medical Regiment, in Boston (MA)
    - Headquarters and Headquarters and Service Company
    - Collecting Battalion
      - battalion consists of: 1× Headquarters, 3× Collecting companies
    - Ambulance Battalion
      - battalion consists of: 1× Headquarters, 3× Ambulance companies
    - Clearing Battalion
      - battalion consists of: 1× Headquarters, 3× Clearing companies
  - 101st Quartermaster Regiment, in West Newton (MA)
    - Headquarters and Headquarters Company
    - 2× Truck battalions
      - each battalion consists of: 1× Headquarters, 2× Truck companies
    - Light Maintenance and Car Battalion
      - battalion consists of: 1× Headquarters, 1× Light Maintenance Company, 1× Car Company
    - Service Company
  - Headquarters, Special Troops, in Allston (MA)
    - Headquarters Company, 26th Division, in Boston (MA)
    - 26th Signal Company, in Allston (MA)
    - 101st Ordnance Company, in Natick (MA)
    - 26th Military Police Company, in Boston (MA)

From December 1941 through early 1942 the division was available to the Eastern Defense Command for mobile defense; the 104th Infantry remained on this duty through January 1943.

In January 1942, the Headquarters and Headquarters Company, 56th Infantry Brigade, 182nd Infantry Regiment, 2nd Battalion, 180th Field Artillery Regiment, 2nd Battalion, 101st Quartermaster Regiment, two companies of the 101st Medical Regiment, the 1st Battalion, 101st Engineer Regiment, 26th Signal Company, and a platoon of the 26th Military Police Company were sent to New Caledonia to bolster the defenses of the island in the face of possible Japanese threats to Australia; these units would later help form the Americal Division. On 27 January 1943, the 181st Infantry Regiment was relieved from the 26th Division and reassigned to the Eastern Defense Command.

===== Triangular division =====
On 12 February 1942, as a part of an Army-wide reorganization of National Guard divisions, the 26th Division was reorganized as a triangular division. The division's two brigade headquarters were disbanded in favor of a structure containing three separate regimental commands reporting directly to the division headquarters, as well as four field artillery battalions under a division artillery headquarters, with the engineer, medical, and quartermaster regiments also reduced to battalions. With the reorganization the division was renamed 26th Infantry Division. Afterwards the 26th Infantry Division was composed of the following units:

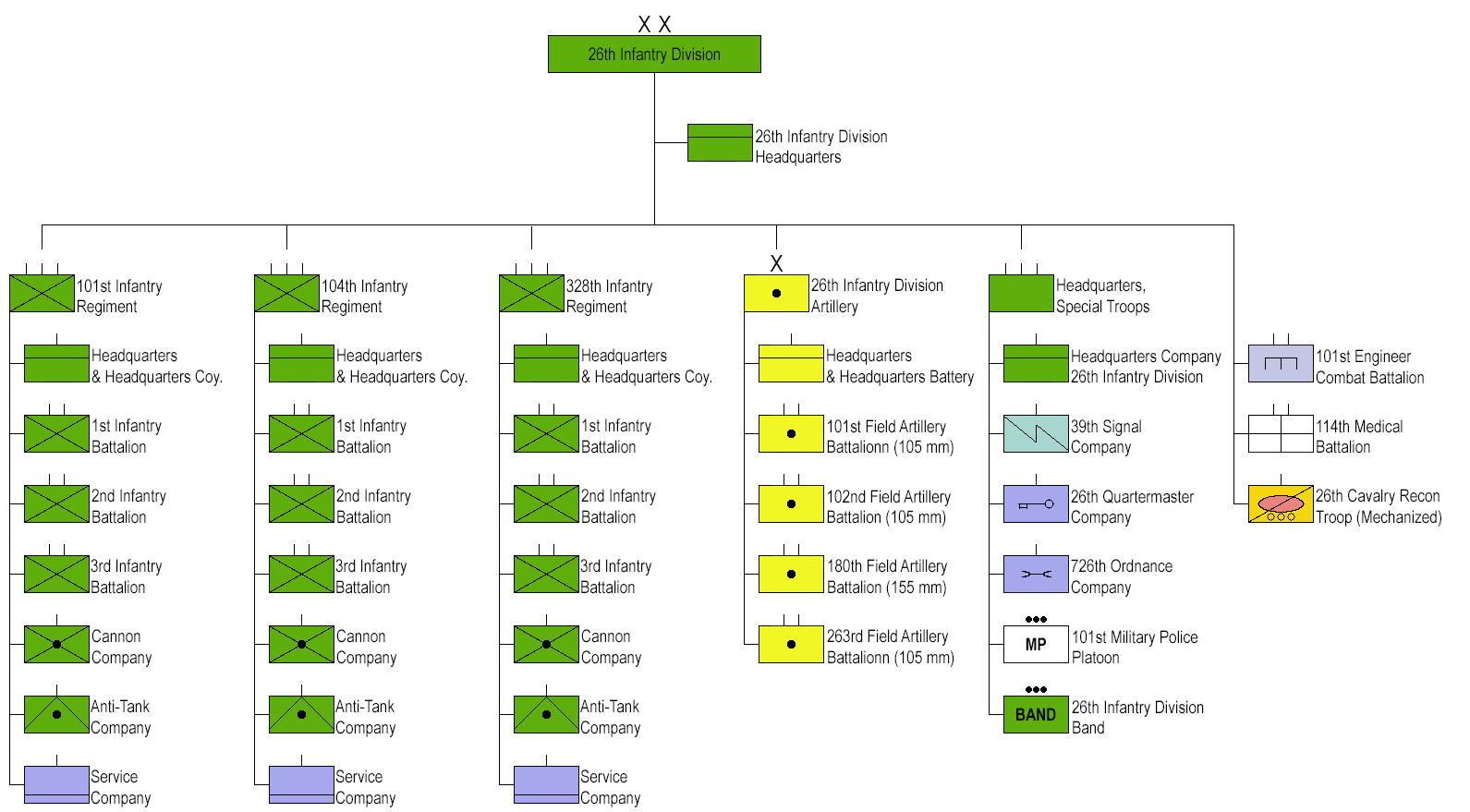
26th Infantry Division triangular organization (click to enlarge)

- 26th Infantry Division
  - 26th Infantry Division Headquarters
  - 26th Cavalry Reconnaissance Troop (Mechanized) (M3 scout cars and then M8 Greyhound armored cars)
  - 101st Infantry Regiment
    - Headquarters and Headquarters Company
    - 3× Infantry battalions
      - each battalion consists of: 1× Headquarters and Headquarters Company, 3× Rifle companies, 1× Heavy Weapons Company
    - Cannon Company (T12 Gun Motor Carriages and T19 Howitzer Motor Carriages, later replaced by either M3 105mm towed howitzers or M7 Priest self propelled howitzers)
    - Anti-Tank Company (M3 37mm anti-tank guns, which were replaced by 1944 with M1 57mm anti-tank guns)
    - Service Company
  - 104th Infantry Regiment
    - same organization as 101st Infantry Regiment
  - 181st Infantry Regiment (relieved from assignment to the division on 27 January 1943)
    - same organization as 101st Infantry Regiment
  - 328th Infantry Regiment (assigned to the division on 27 January 1943)
    - same organization as 101st Infantry Regiment
  - 26th Infantry Division Artillery
    - Headquarters and Headquarters Battery
    - 101st Field Artillery Battalion
      - Headquarters and Headquarters Battery
      - 3× Batteries (M2 105mm towed howitzers)
      - Service Battery
    - 102nd Field Artillery Battalion
      - same organization as 101st Field Artillery Battalion
    - 180th Field Artillery Battalion
      - Headquarters and Headquarters Battery
      - 3× Batteries (M1 155mm towed howitzers)
      - Service Battery
    - 263rd Field Artillery Battalion
      - same organization as 101st Field Artillery Battalion
  - Headquarters Special Troops
    - Headquarters Company, 26th Infantry Division
    - 39th Signal Company
    - 26th Quartermaster Company
    - 726th Ordnance Light Maintenance Company
    - 101st Military Police Platoon
    - 26th Infantry Division Band (attached)
  - 26th Quartermaster Battalion (Between September and November 1942 Quartermaster battalions were disbanded and their platoons used to form a Quartermaster Company and an Ordnance Company, which were both assigned to Headquarters Special Troops)
    - Headquarters and Headquarters Company (includes a service platoon and a maintenance platoon)
    - Truck Company
  - 101st Engineer Combat Battalion
    - Headquarters and Headquarters and Service Company
    - 3× Engineer combat companies
  - 114th Medical Battalion
    - Headquarters and Headquarters Detachment
    - 3× Collecting companies
    - Clearing Company

In August 1943, Major General Willard Stewart Paul took command of the division, which he would lead through the rest of the war. Before deploying overseas to the European Theater of Operations (ETO), the 26th Infantry Division trained at Camp Campbell, Kentucky, and prepared to depart for the Western Front in late August 1944. By 1944, only about 800 of the personnel that had mobilized with the division in 1941 remained with it, and it is often said that more former 26th Infantry Division soldiers fought with the Americal Division in the Pacific than with the "Yankee Division" in Europe.

==== Overseas ====
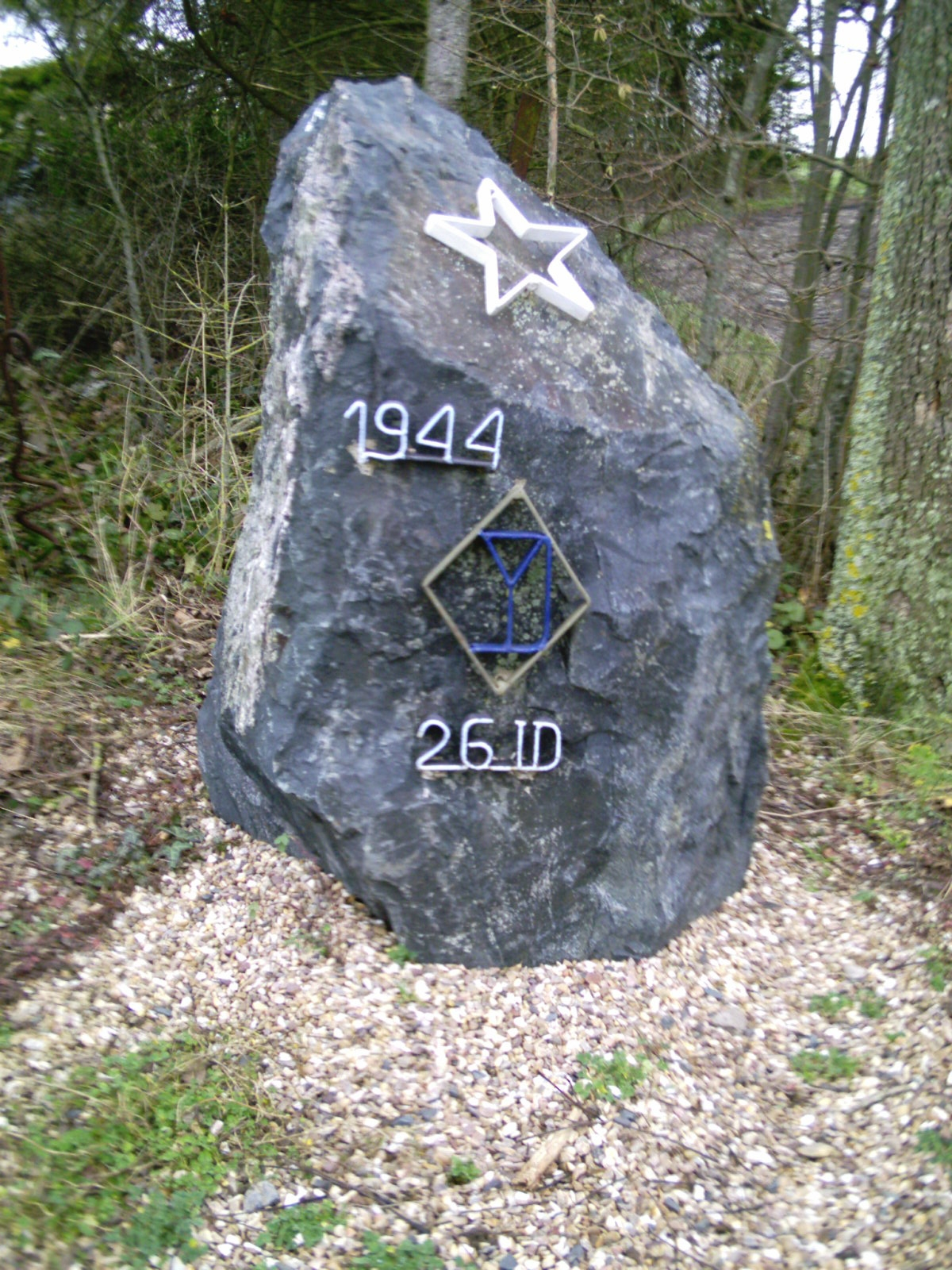
A memorial of the 26th Infantry Division in Moyenvic, France

The division was assigned to III Corps of the U.S. Ninth Army, under Lieutenant General William Hood Simpson, part of the 12th Army Group, commanded by Lieutenant General Omar Bradley. It was shipped from the United States directly to France, and was not sent through Britain. The 26th ID landed in France at Cherbourg and Utah Beach on 7 September 1944, but did not enter combat as a division until a month later. Elements were on patrol duty along the coast from Carteret to Siouville from 13 to 30 September. The 328th Infantry saw action with the 80th Infantry Division from 5 to 15 October. The division was then reassigned to XII Corps of Lieutenant General George S. Patton's U.S. Third Army. On 7 October, the 26th relieved the 4th Armored Division in the Salonnes-Moncourt-Canal du Rhine au Marne sector, and maintained defensive positions. The division launched a limited objective attack on 22 October, in the Moncourt woods. On 8 November, the 26th then went on the offensive, along with first all Black tank Battalion, the 761st, who spearheaded the assault, the 26th Division took Dieuze on 20 November, advanced across the Saar River to Saar Union, and captured it on 2 December, after house-to-house fighting. Reaching Maginot fortifications on 5 December, it regrouped, entering Sarreguemines on 8 December. Around this time it was reassigned to III Corps.

Rest at Metz was interrupted by the German offensive in the Ardennes, the Battle of the Bulge. The division moved north to Luxembourg from 19 to 21 December, to take part in the battle of the Ardennes break-through. It attacked at Rambrouch and Grosbous on 22 December, beat off strong German counterattacks, captured Arsdorf on Christmas Day after heavy fighting, attacked toward the Wiltz River, but was forced to withdraw in the face of determined German resistance. After regrouping on 5–8 January 1945, it attacked again, crossing the Wiltz River on 20 January.

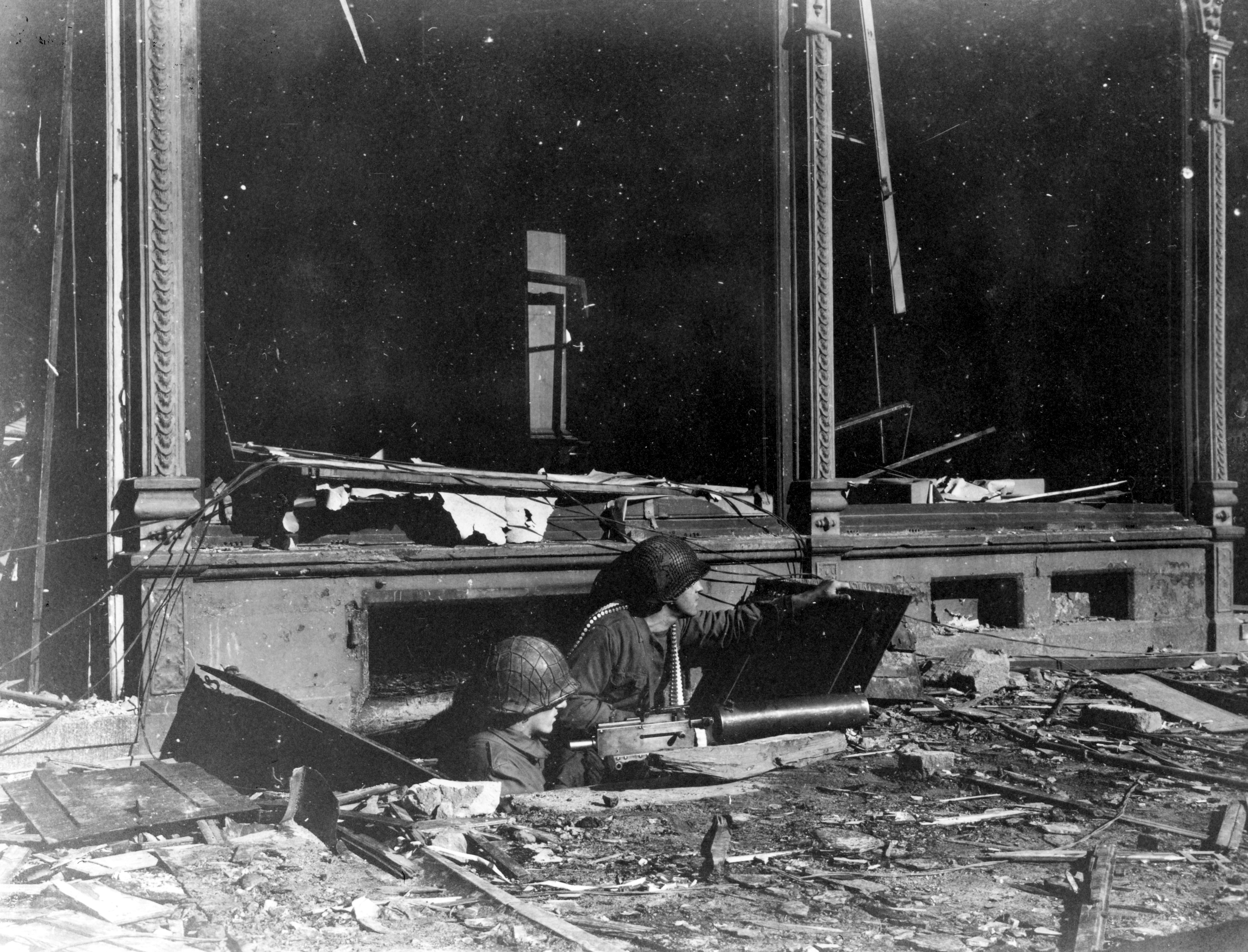
A machine gun team of the 26th Division, alerted by potential German sniper fire (3 March 1945)

The division continued its advance, taking Grummelscheid on 21 January, and crossed the Clerf River on 24 January. The division was reassigned to XX Corps. The division immediately shifted to the east bank of the Saar, and maintained defensive positions in the Saarlautern area from 29 January until 6 March 1945.

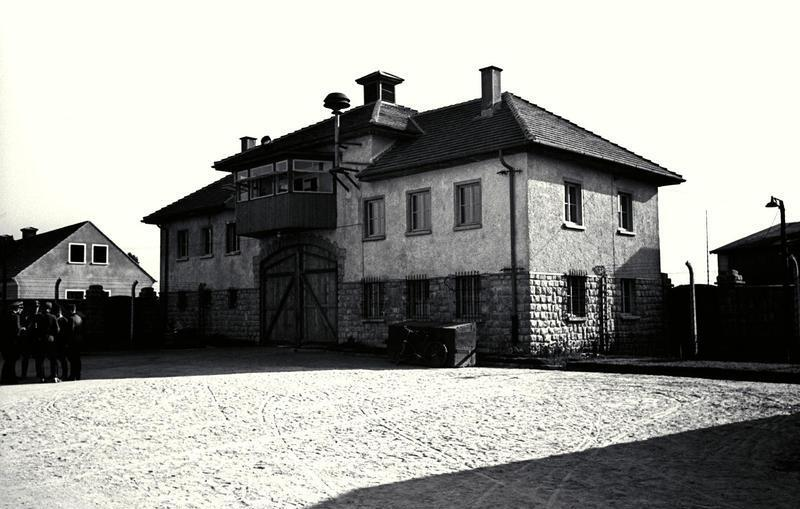
Gusen concentration camp.

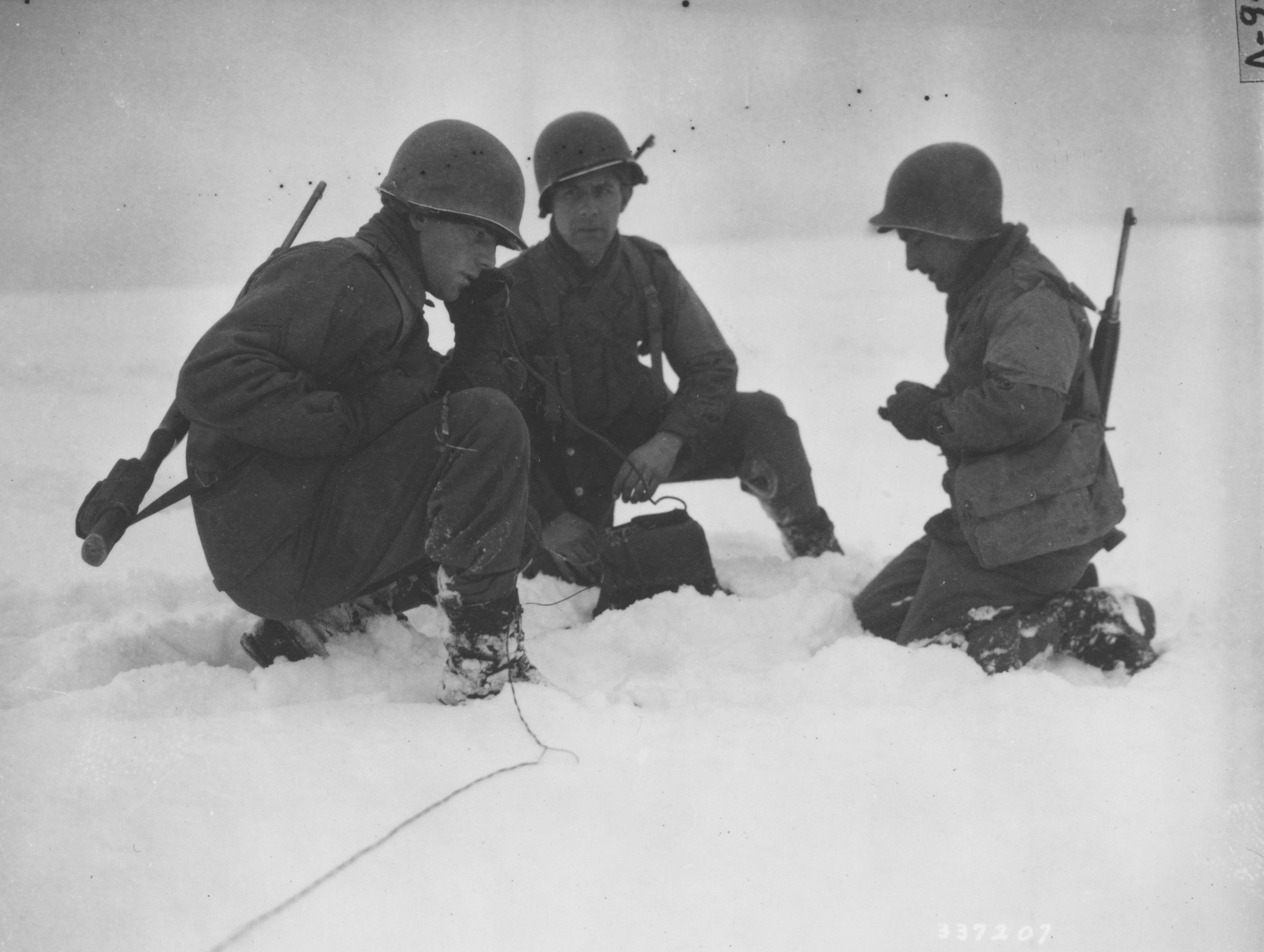
G.I.s of the 102nd Field Artillery Battalion, 26th Infantry Division, check a wire line at a forward observation post on the outskirts of Wiltz, Luxembourg, January 6, 1945.

The division's drive to the Rhine River jumped off on 13 March 1945, and carried the division through Merzig from 17 March, to the Rhine by 21 March, and across the Rhine at Oppenheim on 25–26 March.

The division was subsequently reassigned to XII Corps. It took part in the house-to-house reduction of Hanau on 28 March, broke out of the Main River bridgehead, drove through Fulda on 1 April, and helped reduce Meiningen on 5 April. Moving southeast into Austria, the division assisted in the capture of Linz, 5 May. It had changed the direction of its advance, and was moving northeast into Czechoslovakia, across the Vltava River, when the cease-fire order was received. One day later, the division overran the Gusen concentration camp in conjunction with the 11th Armored Division, liberating it from German forces. There, it discovered that the Germans had used forced labor to carve out an elaborate tunnel system with underground aircraft production facilities. SS officers at the camp allegedly planned to demolish the tunnels with the prisoners inside, but the movement of the 26th Infantry and 11th Armored Divisions prevented this.

==== Commanders ====
- Major General Edward L. Logan (22 March 1923 – 21 March 1928)
- Major General Alfred F. Foote (3 May 1928 – 14 November 1930)
- Major General Erland F. Fish (14 November 1930 – 16 November 1934)
- Major General Daniel Needham (16 November 1934 – 15 November 1939)
- Major General Roger W. Eckfeldt (16 November 1939 – 22 August 1943)

==== Casualties ====
- Total battle casualties: 10,701
- Killed in action: 1,850
- Wounded in action: 7,886
- Missing in action: 159
- Prisoner of war: 806

==== Post-war ====
The 26th Infantry Division received one Distinguished Unit Citation (3rd Battalion, 101st Infantry Regiment, 18–21 November 1944; WD GO 109, 1945). Soldiers were awarded two Medals of Honor, 38 Distinguished Service Crosses, seven Legions of Merit, 927 Silver Stars, 42 Soldier's Medals, 5,331 Bronze Star Medals, and 98 Air Medals. The division returned to the United States and inactivated at Camp Myles Standish, Massachusetts on 21 December 1945.

=== Cold War ===
The division was reactivated on 11 April 1947 in Boston. It remained as the major command of the Massachusetts Army National Guard, but its command took control of units from other states following consolidation of the Army National Guard. The division remained as an active reserve component of the Army National Guard, but it was not selected for any deployments to cold war contingencies. In 1956 the division received its distinctive unit insignia.

The division was reorganized in accordance with the Pentomic organization in 1959. The five infantry battle groups of the division were the 1st Battle Group (BG), 101st Infantry, 1st BG, 104th Infantry, 1st BG, 181st Infantry, 1st BG, 182nd Infantry, and 1st BG, 220th Infantry. The 104th Infantry Regiment was reorganized on 1 May 1959 under the Combat Arms Regimental System as the 1st Battle Group, 104th Infantry.

In 1963, the division was reorganized under the Reorganization Objective Army Division plan, which used battalions organized under a brigade-based system. The 101st Infantry Regiment became the basis of the 1st Brigade, 26th Infantry Division, headquartered in Dorchester, Massachusetts; the 104th Infantry Regiment became the basis of the 3rd Brigade, 26th Infantry Division, headquartered in Springfield, Massachusetts. Among the division's units in 1965 were the 1-101, 1–104, 2–104, 1–181, 1–182, and 1-220 Infantry, and 1-101 FA. The division was organized as a light infantry division, and at the same time, the 26th Aviation Battalion was established to provide air support. In 1967, the 43rd Infantry Division of the Connecticut Army National Guard was inactivated and consolidated into the 43rd Brigade, and put under the command of the 26th Infantry Division.

In 1987, the 26th Aviation Battalion was dissolved and the 126th Aviation Regiment arose in its place. The 126th Aviation Regiment's battalions formed the basis of the new divisional 26th Aviation Brigade. In 1988, the division’s 3rd Brigade comprised the 1st and 2nd Battalions, 104th Infantry Regiment and the 1st Battalions of the 181st and 182nd Infantry Regiments.

On 1 April 1988, the division was relocated to Camp Edwards, Massachusetts. The division headquarters was consolidated with 1st Brigade, 26th Infantry Division. In its place, the 86th Infantry Brigade was assigned to the division as a round-out unit.

==== Inactivation ====
Back of the Yankee Division We're Back challenge coin

Prior to the end of the Cold War, the Army reactivated the 29th Infantry Division in 1985. The end of the Cold War led to the Army reorganizing its forces and further consolidating them. As a result, the Army decided to downsize the 26th Infantry Division into a brigade, and put it under the command of the 29th Infantry Division. On 1 September 1993, the division was inactivated, and the 26th Infantry Brigade designated in its place, based in Springfield. The 3d and 43rd brigades, 26th Infantry Division were inactivated, and the 86th Infantry Brigade was put under the command of the 42nd Infantry Division. On 1 October 1995, the division was formally designated the 26th Brigade, 29th Infantry Division. In 2004, the 26th Brigade transitioned into the 26th (Yankee) Brigade Combat Team. Reassigned to the 42d Infantry Division in 2005, in 2006 it was relieved from assignment to the 42d and reorganized and redesignated as the 26th Maneuver Enhancement Brigade.

== Honors ==
The division received six campaign streamers in World War I and four campaign streamers in World War II, for a total of 10 campaign streamers in its operational lifetime.

=== Campaign streamers ===
Conflict	Streamer	Year(s)
World War I	Champagne-Marne	1917
World War I	Aisne-Marne	1917
World War I	St. Mihiel	1917
World War I	Meuse-Argonne	1917
World War I	Île-de-France	1918
World War I	Lorraine	1918
World War II	Northern France	1944
World War II	Rhineland	1945
World War II	Ardennes-Alsace	1945
World War II	Central Europe	1945

== Commanders ==
Commander	Years
Maj. Gen. Clarence Ransom Edwards	1917–1918
Brig. Gen. Frank E. Bamford	1918–1918
Maj. Gen. Harry C. Hale	1918–1919
Inactive	1919–1923
Lt. Gen. Edward Lawrence Logan	1923–1928
Lt. Gen. Alfred F. Foote	1928–1930
Maj. Gen. Erland F. Fish	1930–1934
Maj. Gen. Daniel Needham	1934–1939
Maj. Gen. Roger W. Eckfeldt	1939–1943
Maj. Gen. Willard Stewart Paul	1943–1945
Brig. Gen. Harlan N. Hartness	1945–1945
Maj. Gen. Stanley Eric Reinhart	1945–1945
Maj. Gen. Robert W. Grow	1945–1945
Inactive	1945–1947
Maj. Gen. William I. Rose	1947–1951
Maj. Gen. Edward D. Sirois	1951–1956
Maj. Gen. Reginald A. Maurer	1956–1957
Maj. Gen. Otis M. Whitney	1957–1962
Maj. Gen. Richard J. Quigley	1962–1967
Maj. Gen. Raymond A. Wilkinson	1967–1970
Maj. Gen. Edward F. Logan	1970–1973
Lt. Gen. Nicholas Del Torto	1973–1980
Maj. Gen. James A. Daley	1980–1982
Maj. Gen. Joseph P. Hegarty	1982–1985
Maj. Gen. Joseph J. Saladino	1985–1988
Maj. Gen. Chester E. Gorski	1988–1991
Maj. Gen. Donald R. Brunelle	1991–1993

== Legacy ==
The beltway around the city of Boston, Massachusetts Route 128, is nicknamed the "Yankee Division Highway" in honor of the 26th Infantry Division. For its contribution in liberating the Gusen concentration camp, the United States Holocaust Memorial Museum continually flies the division's colors at its entrance and for high-profile memorial ceremonies, honoring it as one of 35 US divisions to have assisted in the liberation of German concentration camps.

Notable members of the division include Walter Krueger, Edward Lawrence Logan, J. Laurence Moffitt, the last surviving veteran of the Yankee Division from World War I, and Sergeant Stubby, a dog that served with the division in combat in World War I. PFC Michael J. Perkins, a resident of South Boston and a member of the division was awarded the Medal of Honor in France in World War I. PFC George Dilboy of Company H, 103d Infantry was awarded the Medal of Honor for actions against a German machine-gun emplacement in which he was mortally wounded near the Bouresches railroad station on 18 July 1918. Additionally, two members of the division received the Medal of Honor in World War II, Ruben Rivers, and Alfred L. Wilson. Architecture student Victor Lundy was transferred into the 26th in 1944; he produced sketches documenting people, places and scenes that open a window into life in the division between May and November 1944. Lundy donated the surviving sketches to the Library of Congress in 2009, and the collection is accessible online.

== World War II memoirs ==
The following World War II memoirs have been written by former soldiers that served during the Lorraine Campaign for 26th Infantry Division.

- Robert Kotlowitz (1923–2012) wrote his memoir Before Their Time in 1999, aged 76. He tells the harrowing story of the massacre of his platoon, in which he—by playing dead—was the only one to survive. Kotlowitz became a noted television producer, documentary filmmaker, writer, and former editor of Harper's magazine. He is father of writer Alex Kotlowitz.
- Bernard Sandler (1922–1998) wrote his memoir in 1995, aged 73. It was adapted into a graphic novel in 2022, The English GI: World War II Graphic Memoir. His wartime story is unique as he was stranded in New York as a 17-year-old English schoolboy and ended up in the US Army. After the war, he ran a large family retail business in Northern England before becoming a theatre producer in London, his true passion.
- Victor A. Lundy (1923–2024) did not write a memoir but gave an extensive oral interview to the Library of Congress in 2010, aged 87. This was adapted into a book by Rich O'Hara called "Drawn from the War", which includes his beautiful sketchbook. He then became an acclaimed modernist architect in Florida and Texas.
- David A. Markoff (1923–2013) wrote his memoir in 2013 at the age of 89. He worked as a traffic manager for several machinery and plastic companies in New Jersey.
- William W. Houle (1924-2024) wrote his memoir in 2007 at the age of 83, with further revisions in 2018–2019. Houle was a teacher who earned a doctorate in education from the University of Toledo, Ohio.
- George Kessel (1925–2019) wrote his memoir Dear Folks in 2006, aged 81, based on letters home to his parents. He worked for 35 years in many cities for Aetna Insurance before retiring to Naples, Florida.
- Ed Koch (1924–2013), former mayor of New York, wrote Citizen Koch: An Autobiography in 1992 which included his World War II experiences in the Yankee Division's 104th Infantry Regiment.
- James Haahr (1925–2020) wrote his memoir Command is Forward in 2003, aged 78. He accounts for the bloody and violent combat engagements during the Lorraine Campaign. After the war, he became a US diplomat achieving the rank of Acting Ambassador, Deputy Chief of Mission.

The following two books have also been written about the 26th Infantry during WWII.

- G Company's War: Two Personal Accounts of the Campaigns in Europe, by Egger, Bruce E., and Lee MacMillan Otts., edited by Paul Roley, University of Alabama Press, 1999.
- Not For Morbidity's Sake: The World War II Yankee Division War Diary of Malcolm Fletcher, by Fletcher, Malcolm P., and Mark D. Fletcher, edited by Michael S. Fletcher, 2017.

== Sources ==
- Conn, Stetson; Engelman, Rose C.; Fairchild, Byron (2000) [1964], Guarding the United States and its Outposts, United States Army in World War II, Washington, D.C.: Center of Military History, United States Army, archived from the original on 25 December 2007
- Connole, Dennis A. (2008). The 26th Yankee Division on Coastal Patrol Duty, 1942-1943. McFarland. ISBN 978-0-78-643142-7.
- Courtney, Richard D. (1997). Normandy to the Bulge: An American Infantry GI in Europe During World War II. Southern Illinois University Press. ISBN 0-8093-2084-3.
- McGrath, John J. (2004). The Brigade: A History: Its Organization and Employment in the US Army. Combat Studies Institute Press. ISBN 978-1-4404-4915-4.
- Stanton, Shelby L. (1991). World War II Order of Battle. Galahad Books. ISBN 0-88365-775-9.
- Stewart, Richard W. (2005). American Military History Volume II: The United States Army in a Global Era, 1917–2003. Department of the Army. ISBN 978-0-16-072541-8.
- Wilson, John B. (1999). Armies, Corps, Divisions, and Separate Brigades. Department of the Army.
- Army Almanac: A Book of Facts Concerning the Army of the United States. United States Government Printing Office. 1959.
- Order of Battle of the United States Army: World War II European Theater of Operations. Department of the Army. 1945. OCLC 7764194.
