= Alfred F. Foote =

United States Army general

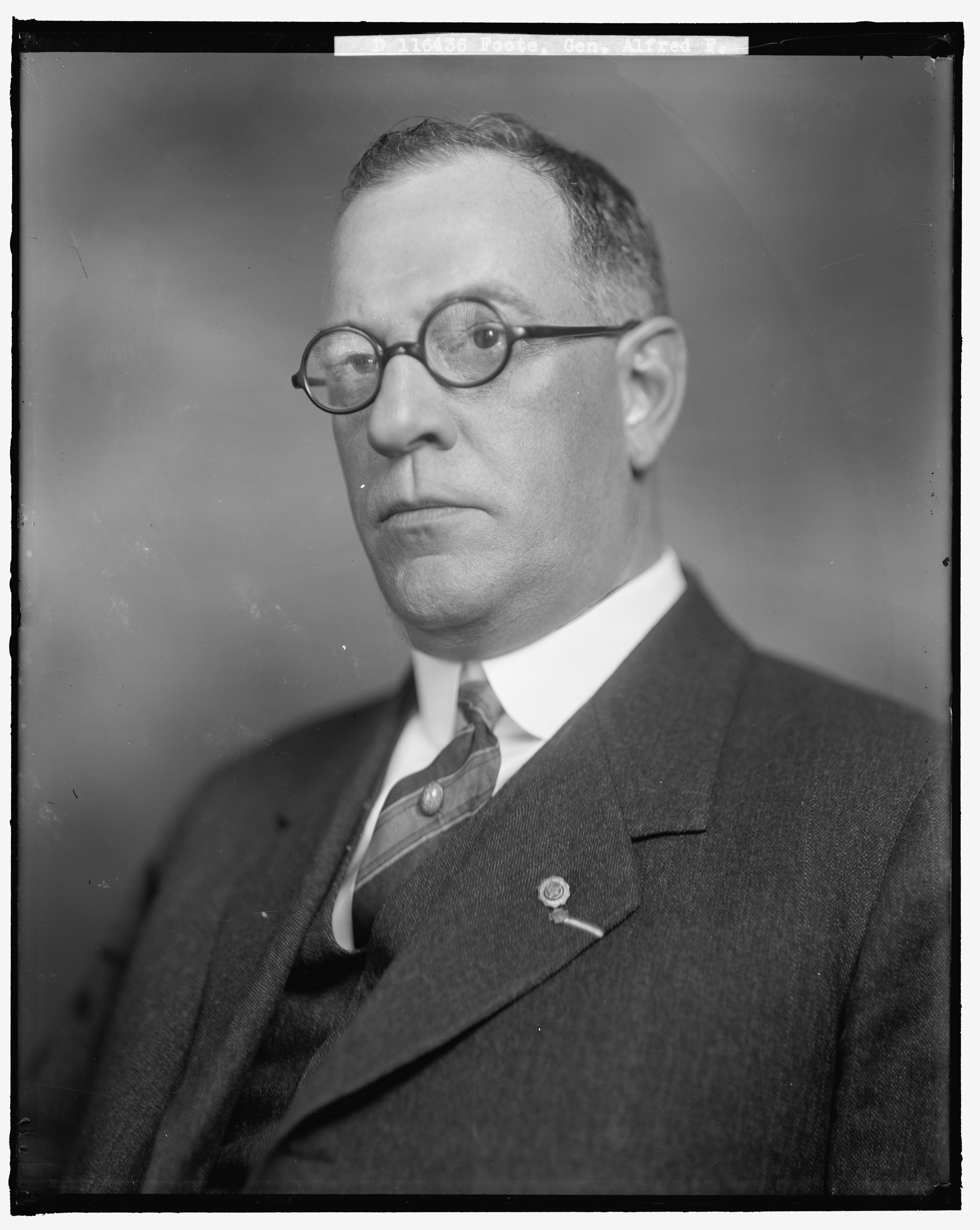

Massachusetts Commissioner of Public Safety
- In office 1919–1933
- Preceded by: Position created
- Succeeded by: Daniel Needham

Personal details
- Born: July 16, 1878 Mooers Forks, New York, U.S.
- Died: May 28, 1965 (aged 86) West Roxbury, Boston, Massachusetts, U.S.
- Party: Republican
- Education: Dixon College
- Occupation: Plumber, soldier
- Awards: Silver Star; Legion of Honour; Distinguished Service Medal

Military service
- Allegiance: United States
- Branch/service: Massachusetts National Guard
- Years of service: 1912–1939
- Rank: Major General
- Battles/wars: Spanish–American War; Border War; World War I; Battle of Belleau Wood; Third Battle of the Aisne

Alfred Franklin "Fred" Foote (July 16, 1878 – May 28, 1965) was an American military and law enforcement officer who served as commander of the 26th Infantry Division and was Massachusetts Commissioner of Public Safety.

== Early life ==
Foote was born on July 16, 1878, in Mooers Forks, New York. He was orphaned at the age of nine. To make ends meet, he worked nights while attending public school. He graduated from Dixon College. At the age of 16, he moved to Holyoke, Massachusetts. In 1905, Foote married Ethel M. Starkweather. The couple had two daughters. In 1920, the Footes moved to Wollaston.

Prior to his military service, Foote worked as a journeyman plumber.

== Military career ==
=== Spanish–American War and Border War ===
On January 2, 1896, Foote enlisted as a private in Co D, 2nd Massachusetts Regiment Infantry. At the outbreak of the Spanish–American War he was sent to Cuba. During the war he rose to the rank of sergeant. Upon his return to the U.S., he was promoted to first lieutenant. On November 18, 1911, he became a major and shortly thereafter was placed in charged of the 3rd Battalion, 2nd Infantry. He led the outfit during the Border War.

=== World War I ===
At the outset of the American entry into World War I in April 1917, Foote was made acting lieutenant colonel of the 104th Infantry Regiment. In 1918, he graduated from the Army General Staff College in Langres and was made a lieutenant colonel. That July, he was promoted to colonel and given command of the 104th. He commanded the 104th during the Battle of Belleau Wood and the Third Battle of the Aisne. For his service in France, he was cited for meritorious service by Major General Clarence R. Edwards, commander of the 26th Division (the 104th's parent formation), was awarded the Silver Star by the Secretary of War, and decorated as a Commander of the Legion of Honour by the French government. In 1923, he was awarded the Army Distinguished Service Medal. The citation for the medal reads:

The President of the United States of America, authorized by Act of Congress, July 9, 1918, takes pleasure in presenting the Army Distinguished Service Medal to Lieutenant Colonel (Infantry) Alfred F. Foote, United States Army, for exceptionally meritorious and distinguished services to the Government of the United States, in a duty of great responsibility during World War I. As Battalion Commander during the operations of the 104th Infantry Regiment, 26th Division, at Apremont, France, from 10 to 13 April 1918, Lieutenant Colonel Foote demonstrated unusual initiative and marked efficiency and contributed materially to the successful stand of the regiment against the enemy's repeated attacks. As Regimental Commander during the Champagne-Marne offensive, by his devotion to duty, courage, and superior qualities as a commander he successfully accomplished all missions assigned to him. Later as Division Inspector, 26th Division, by his tact, sound judgment, and ability he assisted materially in maintaining the high morale and discipline of the division.

=== Peacetime ===
After the National Guard was demobilized, Foote was made inspector general of the 26th Infantry Division. In 1919, he led the 104th when it was called up by Governor Calvin Coolidge during the Boston Police Strike. On March 24, 1923, he was made a Brigadier General and given command of the 51st Infantry Brigade. On May 3, 1928, he was appointed major general in command of the 26th Infantry Division. He resigned from the National Guard on November 14, 1930, to focus on his duties as Commissioner of Public Safety.

== Commissioner of Public Safety ==
In 1919, Foote was appointed by Governor Coolidge to a one-year term as Commissioner of Public Safety. He was reappointed the following year. On November 25, 1925, Governor Alvan T. Fuller reappointed Foote to the position. He was reappointed a third time, in 1930, by Governor Frank G. Allen. In 1933, Governor Joseph Ely requested Foote's resignation after investigations were launched into his office by Massachusetts State Auditor Francis X. Hurley and the State Commission on Administration and Finance. He resigned on March 15, 1933, citing ill health.

== Death ==
Foote died on May 28, 1965, at the Veterans Administration Hospital in the West Roxbury neighborhood of Boston.

Military offices
Preceded by Edward L. Logan	Commanding General 26th Infantry Division; 1928–1930	Succeeded by Erland F. Fish
