= Daniel Needham Jr. =

American lawyer

Daniel Needham Jr. (1922–1992) was an American attorney and political figure who was a partner of Sherburne, Powers & Needham and the Republican National Committeeman from Massachusetts.

== Early life ==
Needham was born in Newton, Massachusetts, in March 1922. He graduated from Newton High School in 1939 and Harvard College in 1943. On November 27, 1943, he married Harriet Gray Leatherbee. During World War II, Needham was a United States Army artillery officer in the Pacific theater and was awarded the Bronze Star. He resumed his studies after the War and graduated from Harvard Law School in 1949.

== Legal career ==
Needham was a partner of Sherburne, Powers & Needham, a law firm founded by his father, Daniel Needham. During the 1950s, he left the firm to serve as an assistant United States Attorney. He was responsible for prosecuting tax evasion, fraud, and bank robbery cases. He resigned in September 1957 and returned to Sherburne, Powers & Needham.

Needham also served as chairman of the Harbor National Bank and its successor, Patriot Bank.

== Political career ==
In 1969, Needham was elected to the Belmont, Massachusetts Board of Selectmen. He won with 58% of the vote to nearest opponent's 37%. He remained on the board until 1978, when he was elected town moderator of Belmont. He retired from this position in 1990.

From 1984 to 1992, Needham represented the Middlesex and Suffolk district on the state Republican committee.

In 1984, Needham ran for Republican National Committeeman. He faced incumbent Gordon M. Nelson, who had upset many in the party by challenging sitting state party chairman Andrew Natsios. Needham defeated Nelson by one vote, 37 to 36. Needham was defeated for reelection by Ronald Kaufman.

== Death ==
Needham died on February 7, 1992, at the age of 69.

Party political offices
Preceded by Gordon M. Nelson	Republican National Committeeman from Massachusetts; 1980-1984	Succeeded by Ronald Kaufman
