= Battery A March =

"Battery A March. March & Two Step"
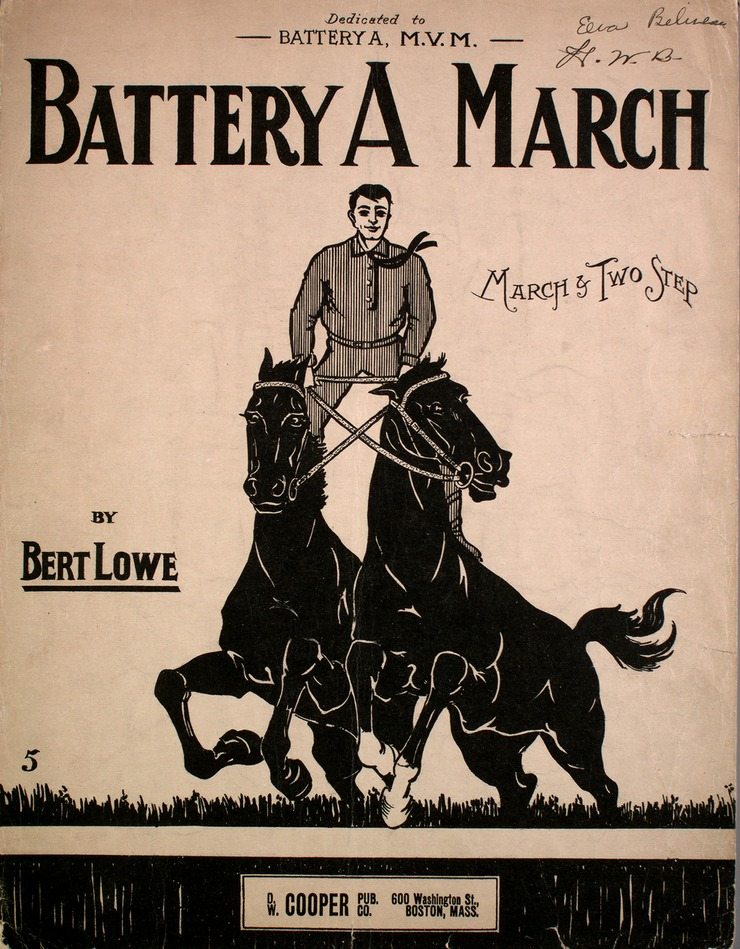
- Sheet music cover

Song
- Written: 1910
- Genre: March
- Composer(s): Bert Lowe

"Battery A March", subtitled "March & Two Step", is a piano march composed and self-published by Herbert W. ("Bert") Lowe in 1910. It was dedicated to and named for Boston's "Battery A," a unit in the 101st Infantry of the National Guard that originated in 1853 and had a distinguished previous record as part of the 9th Regiment Massachusetts Volunteer Infantry. Battery A, known as the "millionaire's battalion" because it included so many upper-class Bostonians, played a prominent part in civic ceremonies and military exercises in Boston during the first decades of the twentieth century. In 1916, the copyright to Lowe's piece was acquired by D. W. Cooper Publishing Company, who issued two editions, with different covers, in 1916 and 1918. By then, Battery A had served with distinction on the Mexican border (1916) and been incorporated into the 26th Infantry Division of the American Expeditionary Forces, in which it served with distinction in World War I. A final edition was issued in 1924 by the C. I. Hicks Music Company of Boston.

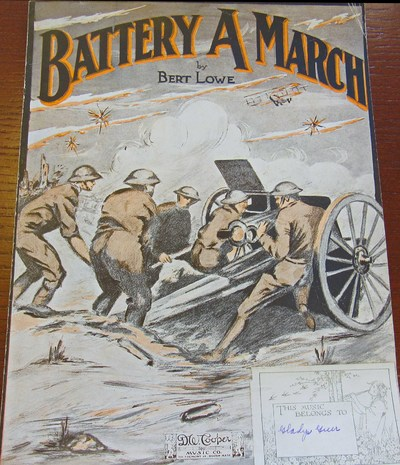
Another Edition

"Battery A March" differs from many similar works in its many republications and its long-term success. In part this arises from the popularity of its composer, Bert Lowe, whose "Society Orchestra" was the premier dance band in Boston until the 1930s. A lively march, especially well-written for the piano (Lowe himself was an excellent pianist), it was performed at ceremonies and functions as late as 1943.
