= Gordon M. Nelson =

American political activist

Gordon M. Nelson (August 18, 1941 – July 21, 1993) was an American political activist who served as chairman of the Massachusetts Republican State Committee from 1976 to 1980.

== Early life ==
Nelson was born on August 18, 1941, in Brookline, Massachusetts. He attended Newton Public Schools and graduated from Newton High School and attended Harvard University, but dropped out to get involved in politics.

== Early political involvement ==
Nelson first became involved in politics in 1964 when he worked for Barry Goldwater's Presidential campaign. He was also a founder and executive director of the Massachusetts chapter of Young Americans for Freedom. After Goldwater's loss, Nelson stayed out of politics for five years, but returned to oppose the policies of Governor Francis W. Sargent. In 1974 he worked for Sargent's Republican primary opponent, Carroll Sheehan. In February 1975 he formed Republicans for an Effective Grass Roots Organization (REGRO), a grassroots organization that sought to attract disenchanted Democrats to the Republican Party.

=== Presidential campaigns ===
In 1972 Nelson directed Richard M. Nixon's canvassing efforts in Massachusetts. In 1976 he was a leader in Massachusetts in Ronald Reagan's campaign against incumbent president Gerald Ford for the GOP Presidential nomination. In 1980 he and William Weld were co-chairmen for Congressman's Phil Crane's short-lived bid for the GOP Presidential nomination. Nelson would ultimately endorse Ronald Reagan.

== Chairman of the Massachusetts Republican Party ==
On May 19, 1976, Nelson, backed by the conservative REGRO faction of the party, defeated Andrew Card, the consensus choice of the moderates, by two votes to become Chairman of the Republican State Committee. He was the first Jew elected to this position. Nelson was also a delegate to that year's Republican National Convention.

Nelson sought to win elections with a conservative ideology and grassroots campaigning. He sought to convert conservative, ethnic Democrats to the Republican party, as he thought they would feel more at home in a conservative Republican Party than a liberal Democratic one. To raise grassroots support and soften the party's "Rich Brahmin" image, Nelson launched a door-to-door effort to recruit new workers to local committees called Project Precinct.

Nelson was one of RNC Chairman Bill Brock's most tenacious adversaries. Nelson desired an ideological crusade while Brock emphasized technological innovation.

In 1978, Republican Senator Edward Brooke lost his re-election bid and liberal Republican Francis W. Hatch Jr. lost his campaign for governor to conservative Democrat Edward J. King. Nelson was criticized by some Republicans, which included Hatch, John A. Volpe, Henry Cabot Lodge Jr., John W. Sears, William L. Saltonstall, Lewis Crampton, and Avi Nelson, for being narrowly supportive of conservative candidates and being unable to smooth over differences within the party. On April 8, 1980, he was defeated by State Representative Andrew Natsios 41 votes to 35.

== Later life and death ==
Following his defeat, Nelson defeated former Massachusetts Governor John Volpe to become Republican National Committeeman. He tried to regain the chairmanship from Natsios, but was unsuccessful. In 1984, Nelson lost his reelection bid for committeeman by 1 vote to Daniel Needham Jr.

Nelson encouraged William Weld to run for Governor of Massachusetts in 1990. However, he later supported Steven Pierce over Weld in the Republican primary. Nelson also led a group of Republicans that supported acting Mayor of Boston Thomas Menino in the 1993 election.

Outside politics Nelson worked as a stockbroker and was a second vice president with Shearson Lehman Brothers.

Nelson died on July 21, 1993, in Boston of a cerebral hemorrhage.

Party political offices
Preceded by John W. Sears	Chairman of the Massachusetts Republican Party; 1976-1980	Succeeded by Andrew Natsios
Preceded by Bruce Crane	Republican National Committeeman from Massachusetts; 1980-1984	Succeeded by Daniel Needham Jr.
