= Daniel Needham =

United States Army general

Massachusetts Commissioner of Public Safety
- In office 1933–1934
- Preceded by: Alfred F. Foote
- Succeeded by: Paul G. Kirk Sr.

Personal details
- Born: May 2, 1891 Groton, Massachusetts, U.S.
- Died: June 20, 1971 (aged 80) Newton, Massachusetts, U.S.
- Party: Republican
- Education: Harvard College; Harvard Law School
- Occupation: Lawyer

Military service
- Allegiance: United States
- Branch/service: Massachusetts National Guard
- Years of service: 1912–1939
- Rank: Major General
- Battles/wars: Battle of Château-Thierry

Daniel Needham (May 2, 1891 – June 20, 1971) was an American attorney, political figure, and Massachusetts National Guard officer who served as commander of the Yankee Division and Massachusetts Commissioner of Public Safety.

== Early life ==
Needham was born on May 2, 1891, in Groton, Massachusetts. He attended Phillips Academy and graduated from Harvard College in 1913. While at Harvard, Needham played goalkeeper for the Harvard Crimson men's soccer team. There, he was named an All-American in 1912. In 1916 he graduated from Harvard Law School. He was admitted to the Massachusetts Bar in 1917, but was unable to practice for many years due to military service. In 1919 he founded the firm of Sherburne, Powers and Needham. In April 1921 he married Frances Sarah Topping. They had two children, Daniel Jr. and Natalie.

== Military career ==
In 1912, Needham enlisted the Battery A. By 1916 he was a sergeant. Three weeks after graduating from Harvard Law School, Needham's battery was sent to the Mexican border as part of the Border War. His unit returned home in October 1916. On May 25, 1917, he was commissioned as a first lieutenant in the Headquarters Company of the 1st Field Artillery of the National Guard. Soon thereafter he was drafted into the United States Army and sent oversees with the 101st Field Artillery Regiment. Needham served as the regiment's communications officer. He was noted for his work organizing the field telephone system. During the Battle of Château-Thierry, he was nearly killed while reporting his observations to regimental headquarters and led a battery that took out a machine-gun nest. He was promoted to captain on July 12, 1919. He remained with the 101st after the war and was promoted to major on November 3, 1920, lieutenant colonel on September 30, 1921, and colonel on April 1, 1927. In November 1930 he was promoted to Brigadier General and placed in command of the 51st Field Artillery Brigade. On November 16, 1934, Needham was raised to the rank of Major General and became commander of the 26th Infantry Division. He retired from the National Guard on November 16, 1939.

== Public Safety Commissioner ==
On March 16, 1933, Needham left his law practice to become Public Safety Commissioner. He accepted the position on a temporary basis at the behest of Governor Joseph Ely, who wanted to restore public confidence in the department after charges were brought against the head of the Massachusetts State Police, Captain James T. Beaupre. As Public Safety Commissioner, Needham reorganized the state police and instituted a number of personnel changes. He also presided over the department during the investigation into the kidnapping of Peggy McMath.

== Later life ==
In 1934, Needham returned to his law practice, where he remained until June 1971. He also served as president of Clark-Babbitt Foods and Hiram Ricker & Sons, a Maine hotel chain and subsidiary of Clark-Babbitt.

From 1938 to 1941 he served on the state probation board. In 1950 he was a Republican candidate for Governor of Massachusetts. He finished fourth in a six-candidate primary with 16% of the vote. From 1956 to 1958 he was a member of the Massachusetts crime commission.

Needham died on June 20, 1971, at Newton-Wellesley Hospital. At the time of his death he was a resident of West Newton, Massachusetts.

Military offices
Preceded by Erland F. Fish	Commanding General 26th Infantry Division; 1934–1939	Succeeded by Roger W. Eckfeldt
