= 101st Engineer Battalion =

- Coat of Arms
- Active: 1920– (forebears date to 1636)
- Country: (Kingdom of England) England (1636-1707) (Kingdom of Great Britain) Great Britain (1707-1776); United States (1776-Present)
- Branch: United States Army
- Type: Echelons Above Brigade
- Motto: TENAX PROPOSITI (Tenacious of Purpose)

Commanders
- Lieutenant Colonel: Russell S. O’Neil
- Command Sergeant Major: Jeffery D. Stoddard

Insignia
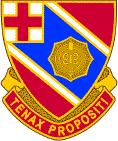
- Distinctive Unit Insignia

The 101st Engineer Battalion is a unit of the Massachusetts Army National Guard and one of the oldest serving units of the United States Army. It is one of several National Guard units with colonial roots and campaign credit for the War of 1812. The 101st Engineer Battalion was originally established as the East Regiment. As the first muster was held on the green in Salem, Massachusetts, Salem is seen as the birthplace of the National Guard.

== History ==
On 13 December 1636, the Massachusetts General Court ordered the organization of three militia regiments designated as the North, South, and East regiments. The East Regiment (later the Essex Regiment) provided protection and support to the Settlers of the Massachusetts Bay Colony for 139 years. It also fought in the Pequot Indian Wars, King Philip's War, and the French and Indian War.

The 101st played a key role in the Revolutionary War. Elements fought the British Army on 19 April 1775, the engagement that started the battle for independence and an active duty regiment saved General George Washington's Army after the Battle of Long Island in August 1776. The same element helped the American cause to remain alive in December 1776 during the Battle of Trenton. They manned the boats for General Washington to cross the Delaware.

During the Civil War, three separate regiments were established in Essex County. The 8th Massachusetts Volunteer Militia sailed to Annapolis, Maryland, in April 1861; boarded the USS Constitution; and sailed her to New York Harbor so she would not fall into the hands of the Confederates. The 19th Massachusetts Infantry fought with the Army of the Potomac and had seven Medal of Honor Recipients. The 50th Massachusetts Infantry had port duty in Louisiana and had one Medal of Honor recipient.

Although the battalion did not fight in the War with Spain, the headquarters company did. The battalion was mobilized for World War I. However, the Second and Eighth Massachusetts Militia were consolidated to form the 104th Infantry Regiment under the 26th Infantry Division. The remaining cadres were reorganized as the Fifth Pioneer Infantry, but was not deployed overseas.

In 1920, the 5th Pioneer Infantry (Engineers) was re-designated the 101st Engineer Battalion and realigned under the 26th Yankee Division, where it would remain until the division was deactivated in 1993.

The 101st Engineer Battalion fought with the 26th Infantry Division under Patton's Third Army, and provided the maps to the Third Army for the relief of the 101st Airborne Division during the Battle of the Bulge.

From 1993 to 2006 the 101st Engineer Battalion was aligned under the 42nd Infantry Division.

In 2006, HHC deployed to Kosovo as part of Task Force Semper Lex or "Task Force MP (Military Police)".

In October 2008, the battalion was placed under the new 26th Maneuver Enhancement Brigade, and placed the "YD" patch back on its left shoulder.

In June 2009 the battalion mobilized for Operation Iraqi Freedom, providing construction and combat engineer support to the Multi-National Division Baghdad/United States Division-Central area. For this, the battalion earned a Meritorious Unit Commendation ribbon.

In 2012, the 181 Engineer Company, 101st Engineer Battalion, was mobilized to Kandahar, Afghanistan, in support of Operation Enduring Freedom. The Engineers moved from Kandahar Air Field to forward operating bases in western Afghanistan. Missions included route clearance, battlefield circulation team (resupply) and air operations out of KAF. The unit was attached to the 20th Engineer Battalion, US Army. The unit returned to Ft. Bliss, Texas in 2013, and to the 101st Engineer Battalion, Massachusetts Army National Guard state area command in 2014.

== Active units within the battalion ==
- Headquarters and Headquarters Company
- Forward Support Company
- 181st Engineer Vertical Construction Company
- 182nd Engineer Company (Sapper)
- 189th Engineer Detachment (Asphalt)
- 379th Engineer Construction Company

== Campaign participation credit ==
Revolutionary War

- Lexington
- Boston
- Long Island
- Princeton
- Saratoga
- Monmouth
- Trenton
- New York 1776
- New York 1777
- Rhode Island 1777
- Rhode Island 1778
- Rhode Island, 1779
- New Jersey 1780

War of 1812

- Massachusetts 1814

Civil War

- Peninsula
- Manassas
- Antietam
- Mississippi River
- Fredericksburg
- Chancellorsville
- Gettysburg
- Wilderness
- Spotsylvania
- Cold Harbor
- Petersburg
- Appomattox
- Virginia 1861
- North Carolina 1862
- North Carolina 1863
- Virginia 1863
- Virginia 1864
- Bull Run

World War II

- Guadalcanal
- Northern Solomons
- Leyte
- Southern Philippines (with arrowhead)
- Northern France
- Rhineland
- Ardennes-Alsace
- Central Europe

Global War on Terror

- Iraq - Iraqi Sovereignty
- Afghanistan
