= Moncourt =

- Commune
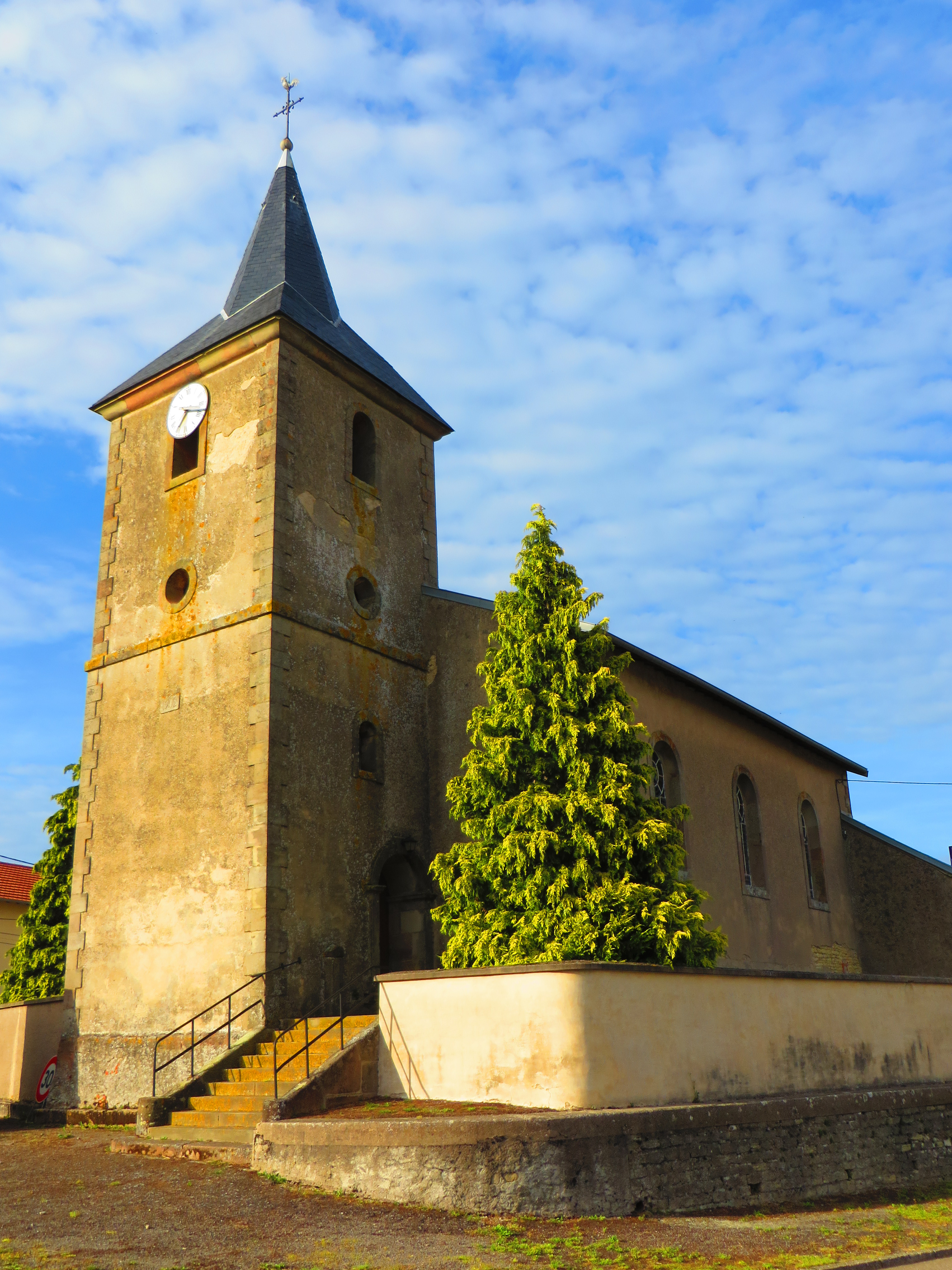
- The church in Moncourt

- Coat of arms
- Location of Moncourt
- Location within France Location within Grand Est
- Coordinates: 48°43′09″N 6°38′19″E
- Country: France
- Region: Grand Est
- Department: Moselle
- Arrondissement: Sarrebourg-Château-Salins
- Canton: Le Saulnois
- Intercommunality: CC du Saulnois

Government
  - Mayor (2020–2026): Sylvain Nicolas
- Area^{1}: 6.74 km^{2} (2.60 sq mi)
- Elevation: 225 m (738 ft)
- Highest elevation: 290 m (950 ft)
- Lowest elevation: 215 m (705 ft)
- Population (2023): 63
  - Density: 9.3/km^{2} (24/sq mi)
- Time zone: UTC+01:00 (CET)
  - Summer (DST): UTC+02:00 (CEST)
- INSEE/Postal code: 57473 /57810
- ^{1} French Land Register data, which excludes lakes, ponds, glaciers > 1 km^{2} (0.386 sq mi or 247 acres) and river estuaries.

Moncourt (French pronunciation: [mɔ̃kuʁ]; German: Monhofen in Lothringen) is a commune in the Moselle department in Grand Est in north-eastern France.

== See also ==
- Communes of the Moselle department
