= 26th Maneuver Enhancement Brigade =

- Shoulder sleeve insignia
- Active: 18 July 1917–3 May 1919 (26th Inf. Div.); 21 March 1923–29 December 1945 (26th Inf. Div.); 13 November 1946–1 September 1993 (26th Inf. Div.); 1 September 1993–1 September 2006 (26th Inf. Bde.); 1 September 2006–1 September 2008 (26th IBCT); 1 September 2008–present (26th MEB)
- Country: United States
- Branch: United States Army National Guard
- Type: Maneuver enhancement
- Size: Brigade
- Part of: Massachusetts National Guard
- Garrison/HQ: Natick, Massachusetts
- Nickname: Yankee (Special Designation)
- Motto: First to Fight
- Colors: Blue and White
- Engagements: World War I; Champagne-Marne; Aisne-Marne; St. Mihiel; Meuse-Argonne; Ile de France 1918; Lorraine 1918; World War II; Northern France; Rhineland; Ardennes-Alsace; Central Europe; Global War on Terrorism; Operation Enduring Freedom; Operation Iraqi Freedom

Commanders
- Current commander: Colonel Shawn C. Cody
- Command Sergeant Major: Command Sergeant Major CSM Sean Ready

Insignia
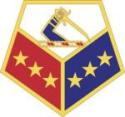
- Distinctive unit insignia

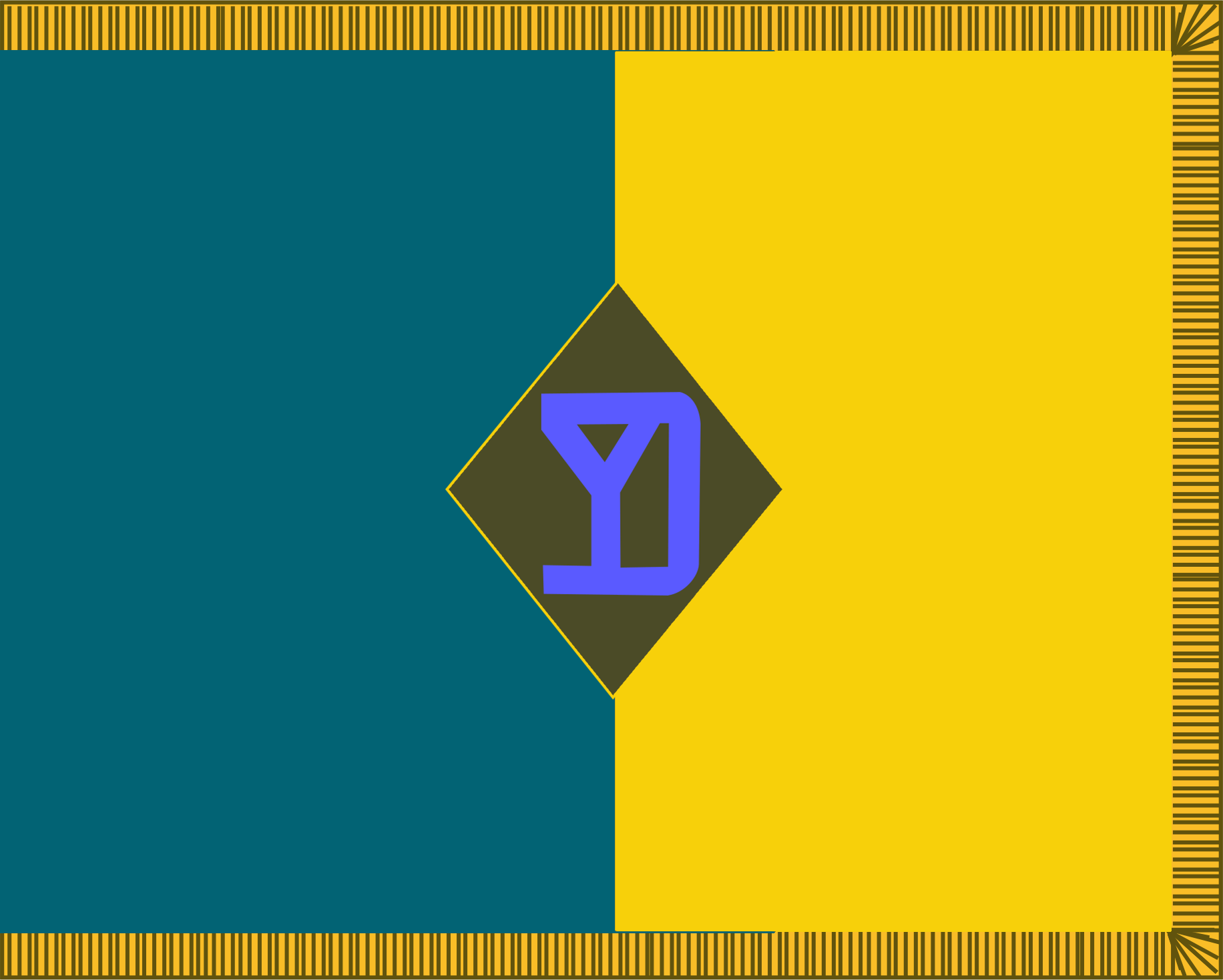
- 26th Maneuver Enhancement Brigade Flag

The 26th Maneuver Enhancement Brigade ("Yankee") is a combat support brigade of the United States Army. Its headquarters is maintained by the Massachusetts Army National Guard. It draws its lineage from the Headquarters Company 26th Infantry Division.

However, most of the history of the current 26th MEB stems from the 26th Infantry Division. The 26th Division served in World Wars I and II and was recreated in the Massachusetts Army National Guard after being released from active duty on 13 November 1946.

== History ==
- Constituted 18 July 1917 in the National Guard as Headquarters, 26th Division (to be organized with troops from Connecticut, Maine, Massachusetts, New Hampshire, Rhode Island, and Vermont)
- 1 March 1963: Redesignated as 1st Brigade, 26th Infantry Division, Headquartered at Waltham, Massachusetts.
- 1 September 1993: Reorganized as 26th Infantry Brigade, 29th Infantry Division
- 2005: Reorganized into the 26th Brigade Combat Team, 42nd Infantry Division
- 2008: Reorganized as 26th Maneuver Enhancement Brigade (MEB), a combat support brigade, Camp Curtis Guild, MA
- 2016: Relocated to Private First Class Michael J. Perkins Readiness Center, Natick, MA

== Units ==
The Brigade consists of:

- Headquarters Support Company
- 101st Engineer Battalion
  - HQ & HQ Company
  - 181st Engineer Company (Vertical)
  - 182nd Engineer Company (CEC-I)
  - 379th Engineer Company (Horizontal)
  - 189th Engineer Detachment (Asphalt)
- 211th Military Police Battalion
  - HQ & HQ Detachment
  - 747th Military Police Company
  - 772nd Military Police Company
  - 972nd Military Police Company
- 126th Brigade Support Battalion
  - HQ & HQ Company
  - Company A (Distribution)
  - Company B (Maintenance)
  - 182nd Medical Company (Area Support)
- 26th Network Support Company

== Campaign participation credit ==
- World War I
  - Champagne-Marne
  - Aisne-Marne
  - St. Mihiel
  - Meuse-Argonne
  - Ile de France 1918
  - Lorraine 1918
- World War II
  - Northern France
  - Rhineland
  - Ardennes-Alsace
  - Central Europe
- War on Terrorism (Campaigns to be determined)

== Decorations ==
- Cited in the Order of the Day of the Belgian Army for action in the Ardennes
- Headquarters Company (Natick) additionally entitled to:
- French Croix de Guerre with Gilt Star, World War I, Streamer embroidered LORRAINE
- French Croix de Guerre with Palm, World War II, Streamer embroidered LORRAINE
- French Croix de Guerre, World War II, Fourragere

== See also ==
- Reorganization plan of United States Army
