= The Yankee Division March =

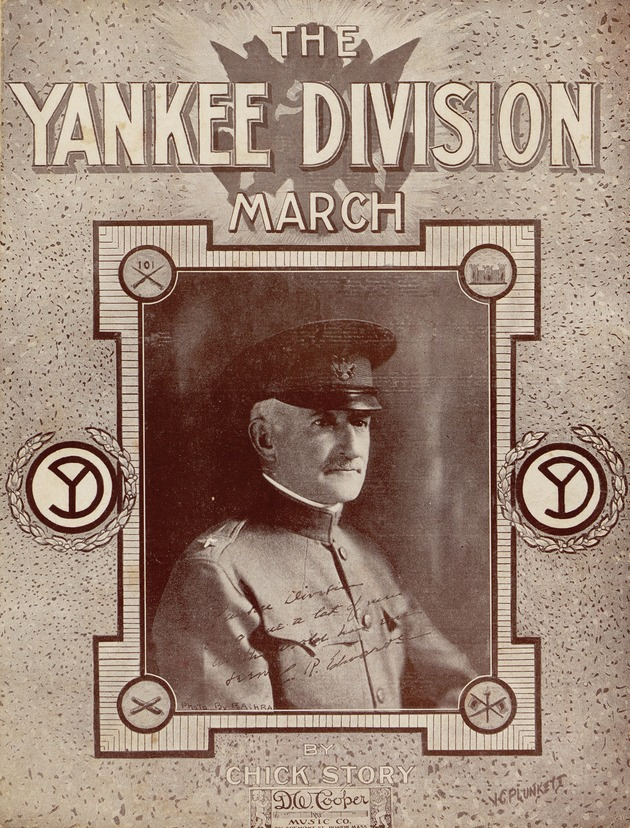

Song
- Published: 1919 (second edition)
- Songwriter(s): Oliver E. "Chick" Story
- Producer(s): D.W. Cooper Music

The Yankee Division March is a World War I march for piano written by Oliver E. ("Chick") Story at the end of 1918, shortly after the armistice. A manuscript was copyrighted on December 11, and a first edition, published by D. W. Cooper, was copyrighted the next day. In this, issued in haste, the music occupies three pages (including the back cover), and a very simple black and white cover was designed by E. S. Fisher, featuring a stylized version of the Great Seal of the United States. Sometime in February 1919 Cooper issued a second edition, with the music on two pages and a more elaborate cover designed by V. C. Plunkett and featuring a photograph of General Clarence Ransom Edwards taken by the Bachrach Studios.

Story's march was one of three written in Boston that bore nearly identical titles; though it may well have been played at the welcoming ceremonies for the Yankee Division, which was a source of great civic pride, it does not seem to have endured beyond the occasion for which it was written.
