= Michael J. Perkins =

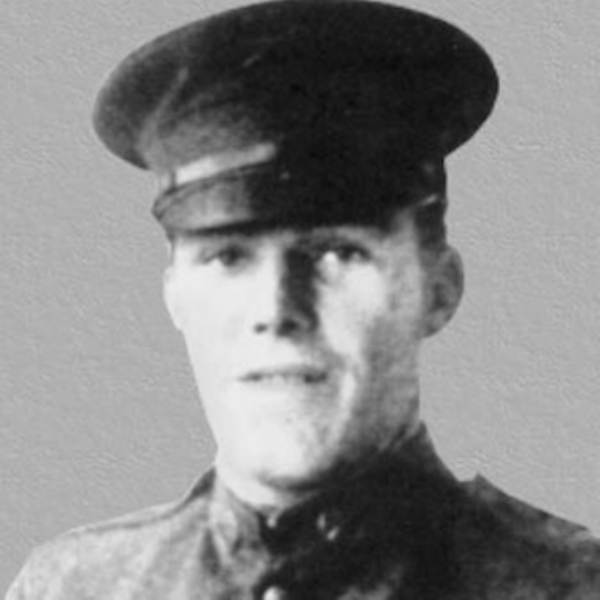
- Medal of Honor recipient
- Born: August 17, 1892; South Boston, Massachusetts
- Died: October 28, 1918 (aged 25–26)
- Burial place: New Calvary Cemetery, Mattapan, Massachusetts
- Military career
- Allegiance: United States of America
- Branch: United States Army
- Service years: 1916–1918
- Rank: Private First Class
- Service number: 60527
- Units: Company D, 101st Infantry, 26th Division
- Conflicts: World War I
- Awards: Medal of Honor

Private First Class Michael J. Perkins (August 17, 1892 – October 28, 1918) was a soldier in the United States Army who received the Medal of Honor posthumously for his actions during World War I.

== Biography ==
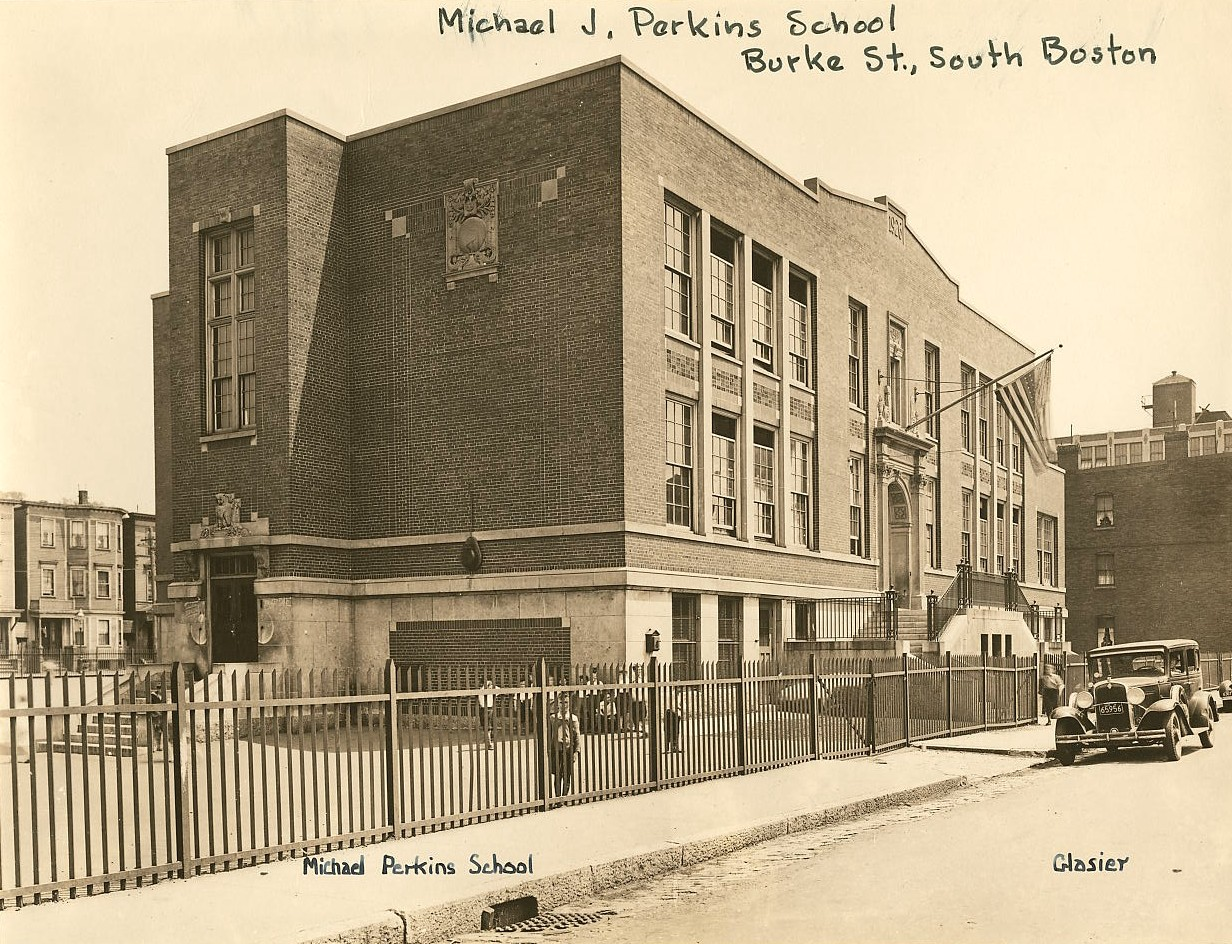
Michael J. Perkins School in South Boston

Perkins was born in South Boston, Massachusetts in 1899, and joined the Army in 1916. Despite being wounded in the action cited in his Medal of Honor citation, he was killed by an artillery shell the next day while being transported to the infirmary. He is buried in New Calvary Cemetery, Mattapan, Massachusetts. An elementary school is named after him surrounding the old colony housing development in South Boston, Massachusetts.

== Medal of Honor citation ==
Rank and organization: Private First Class, U.S. Army, Company D, 101st Infantry, 26th Division. Place and date: At Belieu Bois, France, 27 October 1918. Entered service at: Boston, Mass. Birth: South Boston, Mass. G.O. No.: 34, W.D. 1919.

Citation:

He, voluntarily and alone, crawled to a German "pill box" machinegun emplacement, from which grenades were being thrown at his platoon. Awaiting his opportunity, when the door was again opened and another grenade thrown, he threw a bomb inside, bursting the door open, and then, drawing his trench knife, rushed into the emplacement. In a hand-to-hand struggle he killed or wounded several of the occupants and captured about 25 prisoners, at the same time silencing 7 machineguns.

== See also ==
- List of Medal of Honor recipients
- List of Medal of Honor recipients for World War I
