= Edward Lawrence Logan =

American politician

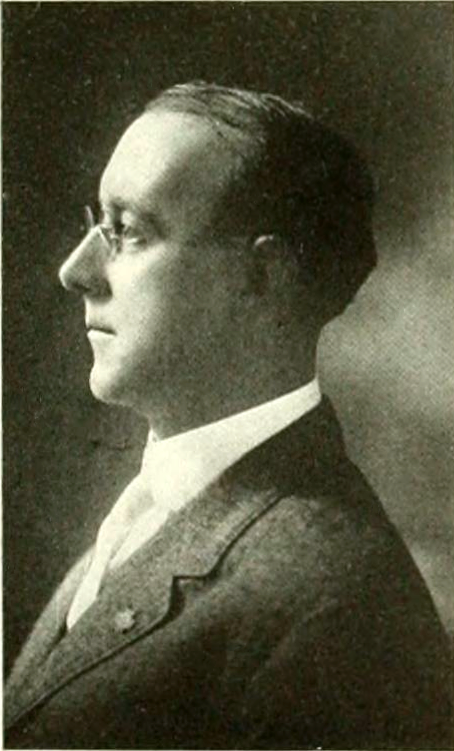
- Logan, c. 1916.

Personal details
- Born: January 20, 1875 South Boston, Massachusetts, U.S.
- Died: July 6, 1939 (aged 64) Boston, Massachusetts, U.S.
- Party: Democratic
- Spouse: Cecilia Mullen
- Children: Edward Jr., Patricia
- Education: Harvard University
- Profession: Politician; Military officer

Military service
- Allegiance: United States
- Branch/service: United States Army; Massachusetts National Guard
- Years of service: 1897–1919 (Army); 1919–1938 (National Guard)
- Rank: Major General
- Commands: 26th Infantry Division

Edward Lawrence Logan (January 20, 1875 – July 6, 1939) was an American lawyer, judge, military officer, and politician. While still a student, Logan enlisted in the Massachusetts 9th infantry during the Spanish–American War. Upon returning to Boston, he ran successfully for a seat on the Boston Common Council in 1899, and subsequently won election to the Massachusetts state legislature as both a representative, and later as a state senator. Rising to the rank of major general following World War I, he was given command of the 26th Infantry Division of the United States Army. Logan was instrumental in the post–World War I reorganization of that unit, as well as the Massachusetts National Guard. He went on to serve as head of the American Legion's Department of Massachusetts.

Logan International Airport, an international airport located in the East Boston neighborhood of Boston, is named after him.

== Biography ==
=== Early years ===
Logan was born in South Boston, Massachusetts, a son of Lawrence J. Logan and Catherine M. O'Connor. He graduated from Boston Latin School and enrolled at Harvard College, from which he graduated in 1898. During his freshman year, he lived in Holworthy Hall, where his roommate was John Rankin McVey, an attorney and banker who became a powerful figure in the Massachusetts Democratic Party.

=== Political career ===
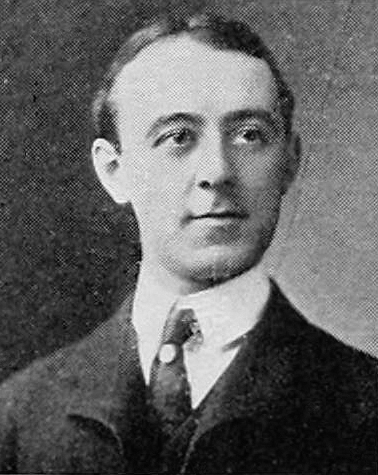
Logan's portrait as a state representative, during his time on the Committee on Metropolitan Affairs, 1902

In 1897, Logan enlisted in the 9th Infantry Regiment of the Massachusetts National Guard. He was quickly promoted through the ranks to sergeant major, and took part in combat in Cuba during the Spanish–American War. He returned to Boston in the fall of 1898 and enrolled at Harvard Law School. While still a law student, Logan won election to the Boston Common Council, on which he served from 1899 to 1900.

In 1900, Logan ran successfully for election to the Massachusetts House of Representatives, where he served from 1901 to 1902. He graduated from law school in 1901 and was admitted to the bar, after which he began to practice in Boston.

Logan won election to the Massachusetts State Senate from a South Boston district in November 1905. He served from 1906 to 1907, and was an unsuccessful 1906 candidate for the Democratic nomination for Congress in Massachusetts's 10th Congressional district.

In 1907, Logan was nominated to serve as associate justice of the Municipal Court for the South Boston District by Republican governor Curtis Guild Jr. He remained on the bench for the next 25 years, excepting his military service.

=== Military career ===
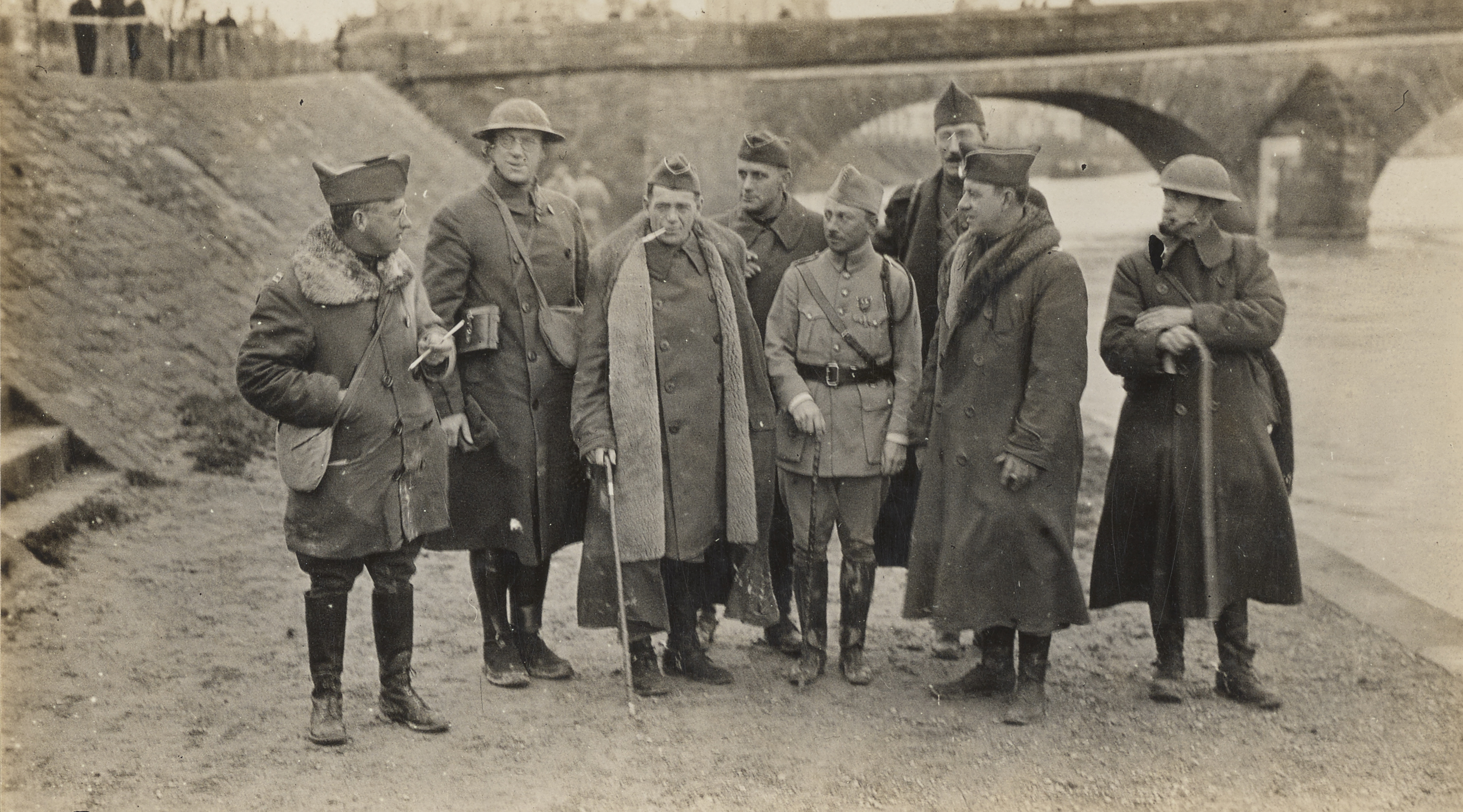
Colonel Logan (second from left) and staff, on the way to the Western front, March 1918.

Although Logan had resigned from the state militia in 1899, he rejoined in 1901, and was commissioned as a second lieutenant in the 9th Infantry Regiment. He served in the 9th Regiment for the next 10 years and was promoted to first lieutenant and captain. In February 1911 he was promoted to major and in May 1912 to commander of the regiment with the rank of colonel.

In March 1917, Logan's regiment was mobilized to guard installations in anticipation of the US declaration of war on Germany. After several months of guard duty, the 9th was federalized and re-designated as the 101st Infantry Regiment, part of the 26th Infantry Division, a National Guard organization created from the units of the New England states. Logan accompanied his troops to France in command of the 101st, and the regiment saw combat throughout the war.

In April 1919, the 101st Infantry was relieved of active duty, and Logan oversaw its reorganization into the Massachusetts National Guard. In January 1921 Logan was promoted to brigadier general and took command of the Massachusetts national Guard's 1st Brigade. In March 1923 he was promoted to major general as commander of the 26th Division. As its first post-war commander, General Logan was responsible for reorganizing and training the division as a completely Massachusetts unit.

=== Post-war life ===
Throughout the remainder of his life, Logan achieved prominence as an advocate for veterans as the state commander of the American Legion and president of the National Guard Association of the United States. He retired from the Guard in 1938. At his retirement, Logan received a state promotion to lieutenant general in recognition of his decades of military service.

=== Death and legacy ===
Logan died in Boston on July 6, 1939. He was 64 years old at the time of his death.

In 1943, Boston Airport/Jeffrey Field was renamed General Edward Lawrence Logan Airport in Logan's honor. Although Logan was not an aviator, he did lobby intensely for veteran benefits to include the high-risk group of pilots.

A statue of Logan by Joseph Coletti was unveiled at the airport entrance in a public ceremony on May 20, 1956. It has been moved several times to accommodate the airport's growth.

== See also ==
- 127th Massachusetts General Court (1906)
