= Company A 1-181 Infantry =

Company A, 1st Battalion, 181st Infantry
- 181st Infantry coat of arms
- Active: 1639–present
- Country: United States
- Branch: Massachusetts Army National Guard
- Size: Company
- Garrison/HQ: Agawam, MA
- Nickname: "Springfield Rifles" _”APACHE “
- Motto: Keep Your Powder Dry
- Mascot: Tolles
- Engagements: French and Indian Wars; American Revolution; War of 1812; American Civil War; Spanish–American War; Mexican Expedition; World War I World War II; NATO SFOR; Kosovo Force; Afghanistan War (2001–2021)
- Battle honours: French Croix de Guerre with Gilt Star (1918); French Croix de Guerre with Palm (1944); French Fourragère; Army Superior Unit Award (2007)

Commanders
- Current commander: Matthew Yawgel

Insignia
- Identification symbol: Torch

Company A 1st Battalion 181st Infantry Regiment is the oldest active company in the 181st Infantry Regiment. In the National Guard, companies can share the history of the regiment to which they are assigned. Company A traces its history to 1639, but also shares the history of the 104th Infantry Regiment and the 181st Infantry Regiment (United States).

The company traces its history to 14 November 1639, when it was first mustered as the Springfield Trained Band. It later served in the Continental Army during the American Revolution, and with Union forces in the American Civil War. It then fought with the U.S. Army during War with Spain, and in the Mexican Border Campaign. In March 1917 it became part of the 104th Infantry Regiment, a federalized Massachusetts National Guard unit. World War I and World War II service followed. Most recently Company A has served in Bosnia, in New Orleans following Hurricane Katrina, in Kosovo and in Afghanistan.

== History ==
=== Formation and colonial operations ===
The present Company A of the 181st Infantry was first mustered in December 1639 in Springfield. The company served against the Dutch on Long Island in 1673–74, In King Philip's War (1675–77), at Turner's Falls in 1676, In King William's War (1688–98), Queen Anne's War (1703–13), King George's War (1744–48) and in the French and Indian War (1754–63).

=== Massachusetts Army and American Revolution ===
In the Revolutionary War, the company served as Burt's Company at Boston in 1775, with detachments serving throughout the war.

During Shays' Rebellion (1786–77) the company fought against the rebels to defend the Federal Arsenal in Springfield.

In 1798, the company became the Springfield Artillery, and served in the defenses of Boston during the War of 1812.

=== Civil War ===
In 1844, reorganized as Company E of the 10th Light Infantry Regiment. Mobilized on 21 June 1861 as Company E (Springfield Rifles) of the 10th Massachusetts Regiment. Served throughout the Civil War with the Army of the Potomac.

=== National Guard and overseas service ===
Mobilized for service in the War with Spain on 9 May 1898. The company served with the 2nd Massachusetts Infantry in the Santiago (Cuba) Campaign fighting at El Caney and was mustered out of service on 3 November 1898.

The land forces of the Massachusetts Volunteer Militia were redesignated as the Massachusetts National Guard on 15 November 1907.

In June 1916 the Company was sent to the Mexican border as Company B of the 2nd Massachusetts Regiment. The 2nd Mass. was based at Columbus New Mexico, and was the only National Guard Regiment to cross the border into Mexico with General Pershing’s Punitive Expedition.

=== World War I ===
In March 1917 the Springfield Rifles was designated as Company B, 104th Infantry Regiment of the 26th Yankee Division for service in the First World War. In France the company served in all of campaigns of the Yankee Division and was awarded the French Croix de Guerre with Gilt Star for the heroic fight at Apremont on 10–13 April 1918. This was the first time in U.S. history that an American unit was decorated for bravery by a foreign power.

=== World War II ===
The Springfield Rifles was mobilized in January 1941 for one year of training with the Yankee Division. The year of training ended in December 1941 but the company's service continued after the Japanese attack on Pearl Harbor brought the United States into the Second World War. Company B Deployed to Europe with the 104th Infantry Regiment and fought from Normandy across Germany to meet the Soviets in Czechoslovakia at war's end. The 104th awarded the Croix de Guerre and Fourragere by France for actions in breaching the Siegfried Line. The company served in the Army of Occupation in Czechoslovakia and Austria until 1946.

In 1946, the Springfield Rifles were re-established and became Company B 1st Battalion 104th Infantry. The Company served through the Cold War.

=== Later service ===
In August 2001, the Springfield Rifles now designated as Company A 1-104 IN, headquartered in Agawam MA, mobilized for service in Bosnia-Herzegovina as an element of the NATO Stabilization Force. (SFOR 10)

In September 2005, Company A mobilized as an element of JTF Yankee for rescue and security operations in New Orleans following Hurricane Katrina.

On 1 December 2005, the 1st Battalion 104th Infantry Regiment (United States) was deactivated and the remaining units were reconstituted and integrated into the 1st Battalion 181st Infantry Regiment (United States).

In August 2006, the Springfield Rifles now designated as Company A, 1-181 IN, mobilized for service in Kosovo as an element of US Rotation 8, NATO Kosovo Force. It was assigned an area of responsibility in southern Kosovo.

In August 2010, Company A, 1-181 IN deployed for one year of service with the International Security Force in Afghanistan in support of Operation Enduring Freedom. The company provided command and control for Camp Julien in Kabul and conducted security operations in Kunar, Uruzgan and Kapisa Provinces in Afghanistan.

In March 2017, Company A, 1-181 IN deployed for one year of service with the Multinational Force and Observers (MFO) monitoring the peace treaty between Egypt and Israel in Sinai, Egypt. The company provided observation, and security operations in the MFO's Forward Operating Base North (FOB-N). FOB-N is located at el Gorah in north Sinai approximately 20 kilometers south of the Mediterranean coastline. FOB-N provides required facilities for both the operational and logistical needs of the MFO in the northern sector of Zone C.

=== Battles ===
King Philip's War, Springfield Train Band

- Battle of Bloody Brook
- Battle of Turner's Falls

French and Indian wars, Springfield Foot

- Siege of Louisbourg (1745)
- Battle of Lake George
- Ticonderoga

American Revolutionary War, Burt's Company

- Siege of Boston

American Civil War, Company E, 10th Massachusetts Infantry

- Peninsula Campaign
- Battle of Antietam
- Battle of Fredericksburg
- Battle of Chancellorsville
- Battle of Gettysburg
- Battle of the Wilderness
- Battle of Spotsylvania
- Battle of Cold Harbor
- Second Battle of Petersburg
- Virginia 1863

Spanish–American War, Springfield Rifles, 2nd Massachusetts Infantry

- Santiago, Cuba (Battle of El Caney)

Mexican Border campaign, H Company, 2nd Massachusetts Infantry

World War I, B Company, 104th Infantry Regiment (United States)

- Champagne Marne
- Aisne Marne (Battle of Château-Thierry (1918))
- Battle of Saint-Mihiel
- Meuse-Argonne Offensive
- Isle De France 1918
- Lorraine 1918

World War II, B Company, 104th Infantry Regiment (United States)

- Northern France
- Rhineland
- Ardennes-Alsace (Battle of the Bulge)
- Central Europe

Company A 1-104 IN / Company A 1-181 Infantry, twenty-first century

- SFOR, Bosnia-Herzegovina, 2001
- Kosovo, Kosovo Force
- Afghanistan War (2001–2021)

=== Unit decorations ===
| Ribbon | Award | Year | Notes |
|---|---|---|---|
| | French Croix de Guerre, World War I (With Gilt Star) | 104th IN cited; WD GO 11, 1924 | Embroidered "LORRAINE" |
| | French Croix de Guerre, World War II (With Palm) | 104th IN cited; DA GO 43, 1950 | Embroidered "LORRAINE" |
| | French Fourragère in the colors of the Croix de Guerre, World War II | 104th IN cited; DA GO 43, 1950 | |
| | Presidential Unit Citation, World War II | 1944 | Embroidered "LUXEMBOURG" |
| | Army Superior Unit Award | HQDA GO 2010-19 | Kosovo |
| | Meritorious Unit Commendation, Afghanistan | 1-181st IN cited; DA Perm Orders 326-26, 2012 | Embroidered "AFGHANISTAN" |

== See also ==
- 181st Infantry Regiment (United States)
- 104th Infantry Regiment (United States)
- Headquarters Company 1-181 Infantry (Wellington Rifles)
- Company B 1-181 Infantry
- Company C 1-181 Infantry (Cambridge City Guard)
- Company D 1-181 Infantry (Hudson Light Guards)
- 1181 Forward Support Company
