= 1181st Forward Support Company =

- 181st Infantry Regiment coat of arms
- Active: 1781–present
- Country: United States
- Branch: Massachusetts Army National Guard
- Size: Company
- Garrison/HQ: Leominster, MA
- Motto: "Keep Your Powder Dry”
- Engagements: American Civil War; Spanish–American War; Mexican Expedition; World War I World War II

Commanders
- Current commander: Captain Jason Voas

"Fenway Company" the 1181st Forward Support Company (later I Co, 250th SB) is the forward support company (FSC) for the 1st Battalion, 181st Infantry Regiment. It provides transportation, maintenance and logistical support to the battalion operations. In the National Guard, companies sometimes have two histories. They share the history of the regiment to which they are assigned, but also have a unique company history and lineage. The 1181st FSC, for example, shares the history of the 181st Infantry Regiment. The company traces its history to the end of the Revolutionary War when it was first mustered as the 5th company of the 8th Regiment of Massachusetts Militia. It saw action in the Civil War as part of the 15th Massachusetts Infantry. It later served during the Spanish–American War, Mexican Border Campaign, World War I and World War II.

== History ==
=== Formation and Civil War ===
The company was first formed during the late Revolutionary War as the 5th Company, 8th Regiment of Mass. Militia.

The company served in the Civil War with the 15th Mass. Infantry. On July 12, the regiment was mustered into the United States service with under Major Charles Devens Jr. It was mustered out on 21 July 1864 in Worcester, MA.

=== National Guard and overseas service ===
Mobilized for service in the War with Spain on 13 May 1898. The company served with in the United States and was mustered out of service on 21 January 1899.

The land forces of the Massachusetts Volunteer Militia were redesignated as the Massachusetts National Guard on 15 November 1907.

In June 1916 the company was sent to the Mexican Border as part of the 5th Mass. Infantry. The 5th Mass. served on the Mexican Border at El Paso, Texas.

=== World War I ===
On 22 August 1917 the company was mobilized as an element of the 101st Supply Train, a part of the 26th Division, at Camp Bartlett, Massachusetts. In France the Company served in all of campaigns of the Yankee Division

The unit was demobilized 29 April 1919 at Camp Devens, Massachusetts. It was reorganized 15 March 1920 at Fitchburg, Massachusetts and reorganized 1 September 1920 as the 1st Supply Train.

The unit was reorganized and redesignated 30 September 1921 as the 26th Division Train. The unit was reorganized and redesignated 26 May 1936 as Company C, 101st Quartermaster Regiment, an element of the 26th Division.

=== World War II ===
The company was mobilized in January 1941 for one year of training with the Yankee Division. The year of training ended in December 1941 but the company's service continued after the Japanese attack on Pearl Harbor brought the United States into the Second World War.

The 101st Quartermaster Regiment reorganized 12 February 1942 as follows:

- The majority of Company C 2nd Battalion, was reorganized and redesignated as C Company of the 114th Quartermaster Battalion and remained assigned to the 26th Infantry Division.
- The remainder of Company C was relieved from assignment to 26th Infantry Division along with the 101st Quartermaster BN and transferred to the Pacific Theater of Operations.

Company C, 101st Quartermaster Battalion was reorganized and redesignated 10 April 1943 as the 125th Quartermaster Company and assigned to the Americal Division, inactivated 10 December 1945 at Seattle, Washington.

The 114th Quartermaster Battalion was reorganized and redesignated as the 26th Quartermaster Company, an element of the 26th Infantry Division; inactivated 3 January 1946 at Camp Patrick Henry, Virginia.

The 26th and 125th Quartermaster Companies were consolidated, reorganized and redesignated 21 January 1947 as the 26th Quartermaster Company Framingham, Massachusetts, an element of the 26th Infantry Division. The Company served through the Cold War.

=== Later service ===
The unit was reorganized and redesignated 1 March 1988 as Company B, 726th Support Battalion. It was reorganized and redesignated 1 September 1992 as Company B, 114th Support Battalion.

The unit was reorganized and redesignated 1 September 1996 as Headquarters and Headquarters Detachment, 101st Quartermaster Battalion and consolidated with Headquarters and Headquarters Company, 26th Infantry Division Support Command, redesignated as the 126th Support Battalion on 23 February 2007.

In 2008 redesignated at the 1181st Forward Support Company and assigned in direct support to the 1st Battalion 181st Infantry Regiment.

In 2019 redesignated as I Co 250th Support Battalion and assigned in direct support to the 1st Battalion 181st Infantry Regiment.

=== Previous Commanders ===
- Captain Alan Molin 2014-2017
- Captain Kelvin Molina 2012-2014
- Captain Chad Cormier 2011-2012
- Captain Robert Charbonnier 2009-2011
- Captain Timothy Sawyer 2008-2009

=== Battles ===
American Civil War, 15th Massachusetts Infantry

- Balls Bluff
- Peninsula
- Antietam
- Fredericksburg
- Wilderness
- Spotsylvania
- Cold Harbor
- Petersburg

Spanish–American War, 5th Massachusetts Infantry

Mexican Border campaign, 5th Massachusetts Infantry

World War I, Company C, 101st Supply Train

- Champagne Marne
- Aisne Marne
- Saint Mihiel
- Meuse Argonne
- Isle de France 1918
- Lorraine 1918

World War II, 26th Quartermaster Company

- Northern France
- Rhineland
- Ardennes-Alsace
- Central Europe

World War II, 125th Quartermaster Company

- Guadalcanal
- Northern Solomons
- Leyte
- Southern Philippines

== See also ==
- 181st Infantry Regiment (United States)
- Headquarters Company 1-181 Infantry (Wellington Rifles)
- Company A 1-181 Infantry (Springfield Rifles)
- Company B 1-181 Infantry
- Company C 1-181 Infantry (Cambridge City Guard)
- Company D 1-181 Infantry (Hudson Light Guards)
