= Headquarters Company 1-181 Infantry =

Headquarters Company, 1st Battalion 181st Infantry Regiment (6th Massachusetts)
- 181st Infantry coat of arms
- Active: 1898–present
- Country: United States
- Branch: Massachusetts Army National Guard
- Size: Company
- Garrison/HQ: Worcester, Massachusetts
- Nickname: "Wellington Rifles"
- Motto: "Keep Your Powder Dry"
- Engagements: Spanish–American War; Mexican Expedition; World War I World War II; Guantanamo Bay detention camp Iraq War; Afghanistan War (2001–2021)
- Battle honours: French Croix de Guerre with Gilt Star (1918); Meritorious Unit Commendation (European Theater) (1945)

Commanders
- Current commander: CPT Stephen Leary

Insignia
- Identification symbol: Hatchet

Headquarters Company, 1st Battalion, 181st Infantry (HHC 1-181 IN) is the command element for the 1st Battalion, 181st Infantry Regiment of the Massachusetts Army National Guard, stationed in Worcester, Massachusetts. The company perpetuates the Wellington Rifles, the historic volunteer militia company of Worcester. In the National Guard, companies sometimes have two histories. They share the history of the regiment to which they are assigned, but also may have a unique company history and lineage. Therefore, HHC 1-181 IN shares the long history of the 181st Infantry Regiment. While the 181st Infantry Regiment shares the distinction of being the oldest combat regiment in the United States Army, Headquarters Company was formed more recently during the volunteer militia craze of the 1890s. During this time young men began to flock to the independent militia companies forming in each town and city. These companies were both military units and social clubs. Headquarters Company (Wellington Rifles) has gone on to serve in the following conflicts: Spanish–American War, Mexican Border Campaign, World War I and World War II. Most recently the company served in Iraq, in New Orleans following Hurricane Katrina, and in Afghanistan.

== History ==
=== Formation and early operations ===
The present Headquarters Company was first mustered on 2 May 1894 in Worcester, as the Wellington Rifles. The Wellington Rifles were mobilized for service in the Spanish–American War on 3 June 1898 as part of the 2nd Massachusetts Volunteer Infantry Regiment. The company served in the late stages of the Santiago Campaign and was mustered out of service on 27 August 1898.

The land forces of the Massachusetts Volunteer Militia were redesignated as the Massachusetts National Guard on 15 November 1907.

In June 1916 the Wellingtons were sent to the Mexican border as a part of the 2nd Massachusetts Regiment. The 2nd Massachusetts was based at Columbus, New Mexico, and was the only National Guard regiment to cross the border into Mexico with General Pershing's Punitive Expedition.

=== World War I ===
In March 1917 the Wellingtons were designated as Company H, 104th Infantry Regiment of the 26th Yankee Division for service in the First World War. In France the company served in all of campaigns of the Yankee Division and was awarded the French Croix de Guerre with Gilt Star for the heroic fight at Apremont on 10–13 April 1918. This was the first time in U.S. history that an American unit was decorated for bravery by a foreign power.

On 1 April 1923, the Wellington Rifles was designated as Company D of the 181st Infantry Regiment.

=== World War II ===
The company was mobilized in January 1941 for one year of training with the Yankee Division. The year of training ended in December 1941 but the company's service continued after the Japanese attack on Pearl Harbor brought the United States into the Second World War.

Company D was relieved from duty with the 26th (Yankee) Infantry Division and served with the 181st Infantry Regiment on coastal defense duty until February 1944, when the 181st Infantry was broken up with the soldiers going to be infantry replacements in the Italian Campaign.

In 1946, the Wellington Rifles were re-established and became Headquarters Company 1-181 Infantry. The WWII battle honors and service in the Army of Occupation in Austria of the 328th Infantry were credited to the 181st Infantry. The company served through the Cold War.

=== Twenty-first Century ===
On 8 September 2003, HHC 1-181 Infantry was mobilized for one-year duty at Guantanamo Bay, Cuba, as the headquarters of the element providing security for the detention facilities at Camp America and Camp Delta in support of Operation Enduring Freedom.

In September 2005, HHC mobilized as the command element of Joint Task Force Yankee for rescue and security operations in New Orleans following Hurricane Katrina.

On 1 December 2005, the 1st Battalion 104th Infantry Regiment was deactivated and the remaining units were reconstituted and integrated into the 1st Battalion 181st Infantry Regiment.

On 17 June 2007, HHC 1-181 Infantry was mobilized for one year duty at Camp Cropper in Baghdad, Iraq as the HQ Rear Area Operations Center (RAOC). The RAOC provided oversight on force protection, engineering and logistics at Camp Cropper. The members of the RAOC were awarded the Meritorious Unit Commendation (Army).

In August 2010, HHC deployed for one year of service with United States forces in Kabul, Afghanistan as part of Operation Enduring Freedom.

=== Battles ===
Spanish–American War, Wellington Rifles

- Santiago, Cuba

Mexican Border campaign, H Company, 2nd Massachusetts Infantry

World War I, H Company, 104th Infantry Regiment (United States)

- Champagne Marne
- Aisne Marne
- Saint Mihiel
- Meuse Argonne
- Isle De France 1918
- Lorraine 1918

World War II,

D Company 181st Infantry Regiment

- American Campaign

D Company 328th Infantry Regiment

- Northern France
- Rhineland
- Ardennes-Alsace
- Central Europe

War on terrorism, HHC, 1-181 Infantry

- Guantanamo Bay, Cuba
- Iraq War (2003–2011)
- War in Afghanistan (2001-2021)

=== Unit decorations ===
Ribbon	Award	Year	Notes
	French Croix de Guerre, World War I (With Glit Star)	(104th Infantry cited; WD GO 11, 1924)	Embroidered "Lorraine"
	Meritorious Unit Commendation, World War II	1944 (Co D, 328th Infantry)	Embroidered "European Theater"
	Presidential Unit Citation, World War II	1944	Embroidered "Luxembourg"
	Meritorious Unit Commendation, Afghanistan	1-181st IN cited; DA Perm Orders 326–26, 2012	Embroidered "Afghanistan"

== Previous commanders ==
- Stephen Leary 2021 to Present
- Brian Ladner 2020 to 2021
- Garrett Titmas 2019 to 2020
- John Locke (Forward) 2017 to 2018
- Alan Molin 2017 to 2019
- Michael Lutkevich 2016 to 2017
- Sean Klay 2013–2016
- Thomas Clark 2011 to 2013
- Timothy Sawyer 2009 to 2011

== See also ==
- 181st Infantry Regiment (United States)
- 104th Infantry Regiment (United States)
- Company A 1-181 Infantry (Springfield Rifles)
- Company B 1-181 Infantry
- Company C 1-181 Infantry (Cambridge City Guard)
- Company D 1-181 Infantry (Hudson Light Guards)
