= Plymouth Camp =

Coordinates: 41.926°N 70.540°W

Plymouth Camp was a former infantry and field artillery coastal defense base camp that existed from between May 1942 and November 1943 in Plymouth, Massachusetts, United States. It contained barracks, a mess hall, and supply huts. Company K of the 181st Infantry Regiment was stationed at the camp, with Battery D of the 211th Field Artillery Battalion, part of the forces of the Eastern Defense Command for defending the United States. The infantry company patrolled between Nantasket and East Dennis, and controlled the entire area, except for the Cape Cod Canal region.

== See also ==
- List of military installations in Massachusetts
