= 181st Infantry Regiment (United States) =

181st Infantry Regiment (6th Massachusetts)
- Coat of arms
- Active: 1636–present
- Country: Massachusetts Bay Colony (1636–1691); Province of Massachusetts Bay (1691–1775); United Colonies (1775–1776); United States (1776–present)
- Branch: Massachusetts Army National Guard
- Size: Regiment
- Motto: "Keep Your Powder Dry"
- Anniversaries: 19 April: Battle of Lexington (1775) and Pratt Street Riot (1861)
- Engagements: French and Indian Wars; American Revolution; War of 1812; American Civil War; Spanish–American War; Mexican Expedition; World War I World War II; Guantanamo Bay detention camp Iraq War; War in Afghanistan (2001–2021)
- Battle honours: Cited in the Order of the Day of the Belgian Army for actions in the Ardennes (1944); French Croix de Guerre with Gilt Star (1918); French Croix de Guerre with Palm (1945); French Fourragère (1945)

Commanders
- Current commander: Lieutenant Colonel Matthew J. Tina
- Notable commanders: Edgar C. Erickson

Insignia
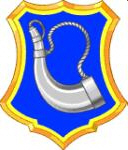
- Distinctive Unit Insignia

The 181st Infantry Regiment shares the distinction of being the oldest combat regiment currently organized in the United States Army. It is one of several National Guard units with colonial roots and campaign credit for the War of 1812. The regiment traces its history to 13 December 1636, when it was one of four colonial regiments of foot of colonial Massachusetts militia. It later served in the Continental Army during the American Revolution, with Union forces in the American Civil War, and as a federalized Massachusetts National Guard regiment with the U.S. Army during War with Spain, Mexican Border Campaign, World War I, and World War II. In 2006 Company A (Agawam) of the battalion deployed as a member of KFOR8 to Kosovo in support of Operation Joint Enterprise.

Most recently the 1st Battalion, 181st Infantry has served in Iraq, in New Orleans following Hurricane Katrina, and in Afghanistan. Post 9/11 attacks, A and B Companies deployed as part of Operation Noble Eagle. The only active element of the regiment is the 1st Battalion, 181st Infantry Regiment, which returned from a year of service in Afghanistan in July 2011. The 1st Battalion was mobilized in March 2017 for one year of service with the Multinational Force & Observers in the Sinai Peninsula of Egypt. Currently, the 1st Battalion is a part of the 44th Infantry Brigade Combat Team, a major formation of the New Jersey National Guard. It was reflagged from the 50th Infantry Brigade Combat Team in 2017.

== History ==
The 181st Infantry Regiment traces its history to the raising of the Massachusetts Militia's North Regiment on December 13, 1636 from existing trained bands. On September 7, 1643, the North Regiment was redesignated as the Middlesex Regiment, which was divided into the Lower Regiment of Middlesex and the Upper Regiment of Middlesex on October 13, 1680; both regiments were renamed the 1st Regiment of Militia of Middlesex and 2nd Regiment of Militia of Middlesex by 1733. The regiments consisted of companies from Concord, Bedford, Sudbury, Marlborough, Chelmsford, Billerica, Groton, Acton, Lancaster, and Dunstable. The lineage of the 1st Regiment of Militia of Middlesex separates here and is held by the 182nd Infantry Regiment.

=== American Revolutionary War ===
Soldiers of the 2nd Regiment of Militia of Middlesex fought at the Battle of Lexington and Concord on 19 April 1775. The regiment was reorganized and entered the Massachusetts Army as elements of Prescott's Regiment, Thomas' Regiment, Bridge's Regiment, Nixon's Regiment, and Johnathan Brewer's Regiment of the Massachusetts Line.

The units were redesignated on 1 January 1776 as the 6th Continental Regiment, the 13th Massachusetts Regiment, and the 23rd Continental Regiment of the Continental Line, and fought in the following campaigns: the Battle of Lexington and Concord, the Siege of Boston(Bunker Hill), the Battle of Long Island, the Battle of Trenton, the Battle of Princeton, the Battle of Saratoga, and the Battle of Monmouth.

The regiment is additionally entitled to battle honors through the 104th Infantry (Hampshire Regiment) for Battle of Quebec 1775 and Rhode Island 1780.

=== War of 1812 ===
The 181st Infantry is one of only nineteen Army National Guard units with campaign credit for the War of 1812. The Massachusetts militia was one of the largest, best equipped, and best trained of any of the state militias but support for the war in New England was lukewarm at best. As a consequence, no Massachusetts units were federalized until 1814, although as state units they were active in guarding the state's coastline. Only after Great Britain burned Washington City and generally increased its naval pressure on the East Coast did Massachusetts allow its militias to be mustered into federal service.

=== Civil War ===
With the start of the Civil War, the 6th Massachusetts (Militia) was ordered into active service for the defense of Washington in April 1861. As it marched to the relief of the capital, it was attacked by a pro-southern mob in Baltimore in what would later be called the Pratt Street Riot. The regiment fought its way through, leaving four of its own dead on the streets of the city. On their arrival in Washington, they were greeted by President Lincoln, who shook Colonel Jones's hand and said, "Thank God, you have come" as theirs was the first armed and trained regiment to arrive in Washington. They slept that night in the Capitol building. The regiment was mustered into federal service on 22 April 1861 at Washington, D.C., for three months service, and served in the defense of Washington before being mustered out on 2 August 1861 at Boston.

On 26 August 1861, veterans of the 6th Mass. formed the 26th Massachusetts Infantry Regiment in Cambridge. This regiment served four years and was mustered out of service on 26 August 1865 in Savannah, GA. During the war, they fought in the Mississippi River campaigns, the Siege of Petersburg, and the Shenandoah Valley Campaign.

In 1862, the 6th Mass. (Militia) recruited back up to strength and were again mustered into federal service between 31 August - 8 September 1862. The regiment was stationed at Fort Monroe, Virginia and fought in the Battle of Deserted House on 30 Jan. 1863 and the Siege of Suffolk in May 1863. Private Joseph S.G. Sweatt of Company C was awarded the Medal of Honor for his actions at Carrsville, VA on 15 May 1863. The citation reads: "When ordered to retreat this soldier turned and rushed back to the front, in the face of heavy fire of the enemy, in an endeavor to rescue his wounded comrades, remaining by them until overpowered and taken prisoner." The regiment was mustered out on 3 June 1863 at Lowell. In July 1863, Company F was ordered to state service to suppress the Boston Draft Riots.

The 6th Mass. (Militia) was again mustered into federal service, in July 1864 for 100 days service and did guard duty at Arlington Heights, IL and at Fort Delaware before being mustered out on 27 October 1864 at Readville, Massachusetts and resuming state status.

The regiment additionally is entitled to battle honors through the 104th Infantry (10th Massachusetts) for the Peninsula Campaign, the Battle of Antietam, the Battle of Fredericksburg, the Battle of Chancellorsville, the Battle of Gettysburg, the Battle of the Wilderness, the Battle of Spotsylvania, and the Battle of Cold Harbor.

=== National Guard and overseas service ===
During the War with Spain, the unit mustered into federal service on 6 May 1896 at Framingham, Massachusetts. The 6th Massachusetts Regiment (Spanish–American War) served with the Expeditionary Force in Puerto Rico. They were mustered out on 21 January 1899. The regiment additionally is entitled battle honors through the 104th Infantry (2nd Massachusetts) for the Battle of El Caney.

The land forces of the Massachusetts Volunteer Militia were redesignated as the Massachusetts National Guard on 15 November 1907.

The 6th Massachusetts was mustered into federal service on 25 June 1916 at Framingham for the Mexican Border Campaign and stationed at El Paso, Texas. More than 140,000 National Guard troops were called up to serve in the campaign, but only two regiments, the 1st New Mexico Infantry and the 2nd Massachusetts Infantry, were assigned to the Punitive Expeditionary Force, and those were to guard the base at Columbus. Historian Clarence C. Clendenen asserts that although no Guard units officially crossed into Mexico at any time, soldiers from the two National Guard regiments at Columbus did enter Mexico to perform various tasks. The regiment was mustered out of Federal service between 10 and 15 November 1916.

=== World War I ===
The regiment was mustered again into federal service on 30 March 1917 for World War I. Most of the soldiers from the 6th Massachusetts were transferred to form elements of the 26th "Yankee" Division, which was also made up of soldiers from Connecticut, Maine, Rhode Island, New Hampshire, and Vermont; 62 men of Company M went to the 101st Supply Train, 82 men went to the 101st Engineer Train, 100 to the 102nd Infantry Regiment, 175 to the 101st Infantry Regiment, 326 men to the 101st Train Headquarters and Military Police, and 12 officers and 800 men to the 104th Infantry Regiment. Company L, which was made up of African American soldiers, was designated a separate company of infantry and later assigned to the segregated 372nd Infantry Regiment. The remaining soldiers of the 6th Massachusetts (15 officers and 279 enlisted men) formed the nucleus of the 4th Pioneer Infantry Regiment, which was filled to wartime strength with draftees. The regiment, commanded by Colonel Holton B. Perkins, trained at Camp Wadsworth, South Carolina. Pioneer infantry regiments included such specialists as mechanics, carpenters, farriers, and masons. They were intended to work under the direction of the engineers to build roads, bridges, gun emplacements, and camps "within the sound of the guns," but also received standard infantry training so that they could defend themselves. However, there are very few documented instances of any pioneer troops unslinging their rifles. Once in France, the regiment was selected to be re-trained to form the 382nd Infantry Regiment. Before that transition could be executed, the Fall Offensives of 1918 pushed the 4th Pioneer Infantry into service in their intended role as engineer support and labor troops. During the war, they served in the following campaigns: the Battle of Saint Mihiel, the Meuse Argonne Offensive, and the Battle of Lorraine 1918.

The regiment additionally is entitled to World War I battle honors through the 104th Infantry (2nd Massachusetts) for Isle de France, Lorraine 1918, and Champagne-Marne.

=== Interwar period ===
The 4th Pioneer Infantry was demobilized on 28 April 1919 at Camp A.P. Hill, Virginia. It was reorganized as the 3rd Infantry, Massachusetts National Guard, on 1 May 1921, with the headquarters organized on 30 March 1922 and federally recognized at Natick, Massachusetts. Pursuant to the National Defense Act of 1920, the 3rd Massachusetts was redesignated on 30 November 1921 as the 181st Infantry (constituted in the National Guard in 1921 and allotted to Massachusetts) and assigned to the 26th Division. Along with the 182nd Infantry Regiment, the 181st Infantry was assigned alongside the 101st and 104th Infantry Regiments to the now all-Massachusetts 26th Division; the 26th's 102nd and 103rd Infantry Regiments that had served with it in World War I were lost to the newly-constituted 43rd Division, which contained units from Connecticut, Maine, Rhode Island, and Vermont. The regimental headquarters was relocated on 24 October 1930 to Worcester, Massachusetts. The entire regiment, or elements thereof, called up to perform the following state duties: flood relief in the Merrimac River Valley, 4 April–19 May 1936; hurricane relief duty at Cape Cod, September 1938. Awarded the Pershing Trophy for Marksmanship (Infantry) in 1939. Conducted annual summer training most years at Camp Devens, Massachusetts, 1921–34, and at the Massachusetts Military Reservation (Camp Edwards) at Falmouth, Massachusetts, 1935–39. Inducted into active federal service on 16 January 1941, and moved to Camp Edwards, where it arrived on 25 January 1941. The regiment took part in the Carolina Maneuvers from 28 September to 6 December 1941.

=== World War II ===
With the United States' entry into World War II, the 181st was relieved from the 26th Division and assigned to the Eastern Defense Command (EDC) on 27 January 1942. The 181st Infantry was replaced as part of the 26th Division by the 328th Infantry Regiment. The 211th Field Artillery Battalion (105 mm howitzers) was attached to form a regimental combat team. The 181st Infantry was assigned to the EDC conducting coastal patrols from Higgins Beach, Maine to Watch Hill, RI to prevent the landing of German agents from U-boats. From May 1942 through November 1943 the 3rd Battalion HQ with companies I and M were posted at the South Hingham Camp, along with B company, 132nd Combat Engineer Battalion, while Company L and Battery B, 211th Field Artillery Battalion were at the Ipswich Camp. Company K of the 181st and Battery D of the 211th FA were at the Plymouth Camp. The regimental headquarters and other units were at Camp Framingham. The 181st Infantry moved to Fort Dix, NJ on 5 December 1943 and was deactivated on 8 February 1944; the soldiers were sent to Italy as infantry replacements in the 3rd, 34th, and 36th Infantry Divisions.

The 328th Infantry regiment fought across Europe with the 26th (Yankee) Infantry Division. Technical Sergeant Alfred L. Wilson was posthumously presented with the Medal of Honor for performing lifesaving care while under fire.

The regiment is entitled to World War II battle honors through the 104th Infantry Regiment (United States) (2nd Massachusetts) and the 328th Infantry Regiment for Northern France, Rhineland, Ardennes (Battle of the Bulge), Central Europe, and the Army of Occupation in Austria.

In 1947, the 181st Infantry was re-formed with headquarters at Worcester. The war record of the 328th Infantry was assigned to the 181st Infantry.

=== Twenty-first century ===
Company A, 1st Battalion, 181st Infantry Regiment, deployed to Bosnia and Herzegovina as part of the NATO-led Stabilization Force (SFOR) rotation 10. This mission, occurring in September 2001, this mission was part of a larger ongoing peacekeeping effort aimed at implementing the Dayton Peace Accords. In September 2003, the 1-181st Infantry Regiment deployed to Cuba as part of Joint Task Force Guantanamo. The unit was stationed at Camp America located in the United States Naval Station, Guantanamo Bay, Cuba. The battalion's mission was to conduct security and presence patrols in and around Camp Delta, the maximum security detention facility housing over 700 high value detainees seized since the United States invasion of Afghanistan began.

In September 2005, 1-181st Infantry mobilized as the lead element of Joint Task Force Yankee for rescue and security operations in New Orleans following Hurricane Katrina.

On 1 December 2005, the 1st Battalion, 104th Infantry was deactivated and the remaining units were consolidated with the 1st Battalion, 181st Infantry Regiment. Prior to the deactivation of the 104th, they were mobilized in support of Operation Noble Eagle II at various locations throughout the Northeast, including Joint Base McGuire-Dix-Lakehurst, Fort Monmouth, Tobyhanna Army Depot, and Westover Air Reserve Base.

In 2007, elements of the 1-181 Infantry were mobilized for one year duty at the various locations in Iraq. Companies served as a rear area operations center, as well as providing security for facilities and personal protection for designated individuals.

The 1-181st Infantry mobilized on 31 July 2010 for a year service at various sites throughout Afghanistan, providing security to Provincial Reconstruction Teams and bases throughout Kabul, in support of Operation Enduring Freedom – Afghanistan. The battalion received credit for the Afghanistan Consolidation III (2010–11) and Transition I (2011) campaigns. The battalion was awarded the Army Meritorious Unit Commendation for distinctly meritorious performance in counterinsurgency, support, and combat operations in Afghanistan from October 2010 to July 2011.

The battalion was mobilized in March 2017 for a year of service as the U.S. Battalion (USBATT) in the Multinational Force and Observers (MFO) on the Sinai Peninsula in Egypt. The MFO is an international peacekeeping force overseeing the terms of the Egypt–Israel peace treaty.

=== Unit decorations ===
Ribbon	Award	Year	Notes
French Croix de Guerre, World War I (With Gilt Star)	French Croix de Guerre, World War I (With Gilt Star)	104th IN cited; WD GO 11, 1924	Embroidered "LORRAINE"
French Croix de Guerre, World War II (With Palm)	French Croix de Guerre, World War II (With Palm)	104th IN cited; DA GO 43, 1950	Embroidered "LORRAINE"
French Fourragere of the Croix de Guerre, World War II	French Fourragère in the colors of the Croix de Guerre, World War II	104th IN cited; DA GO 43, 1950	
	Presidential Unit Citation, World War II	1944	Embroidered "LUXEMBOURG"
	Meritorious Unit Commendation, Afghanistan	1-181st IN cited; DA Perm Orders 326–26, 2012	Embroidered "AFGHANISTAN"

== Units ==
- Headquarters Company 1-181 Infantry (Wellington Rifles)
- Company A 1-181 Infantry (Springfield Rifles)
- Company B 1-181 Infantry
- Company C 1-181 Infantry (Cambridge City Guard)
- Company D 1-181 Infantry (Hudson Light Guards)
- 1181 Forward Support Company

== See also ==
- 104th Infantry Regiment (United States)
- Bedford Flag

== Bibliography ==
- Albertine, Connell. The Yankee Doughboy. Boston: Brandon, 1968. Print. (Retired general's reminiscences of his experiences as a young officer with the 104th Infantry Regiment in France during World War I.)
- American Battle Monuments Commission. 26th Division Summary of Operations in the World War. Washington D.C.: American Battle Monuments Commission, 1944. Print. (Pamphlet with large, fold-out, annotated maps that detail the combat operations of the YD in World War I.)
- Benwell, Harry A. History of the Yankee Division. Boston: Cornhill, 1919. Print. (A comprehensive narrative history of the YD in World War I published immediately after the war.)
- Cole, Hugh M. The Lorraine Campaign. Vol. The European Theater of Operations. Washington: Center of Military History, 1950. Print. United States Army in World War II. (one volume from the official U.S. Army History of World War II. Outlines the combat operations in the Lorraine in World War II. This was the initial sustained action by the YD in the war.)
- Cole, Hugh M. The Ardennes: Battle of the Bulge. Vol. The European Theater of Operations. Washington: Center of Military History, 1965. Print. United States Army in World War II. (one volume from the official U.S. Army History of World War II. Outlines the combat operations in the Ardennes and the Battle of the Bulge in World War II. In this action the YD played a pivotal role in the defeat of the German offensive.)
- Connole, Dennis A. The 26th Yankee Division on Coast Patrol Duty 1942–1943. (This book is a chronicle of the training and the stateside patrol duties of the YD prior to deployment to Europe from January 1941 to 1944. It covers the story of the pre-Pearl Harbor training and maneuvers and it focuses on the 181st Infantry Regiment.)
- Courtney Richard, Normandy to the Bulge: An American Infantry GI in Europe during World War II, Chicago: Southern Illinois Press, 2000. (A memoir which offers a view of the war in Europe from the point of view of a PFC.)
- Egger, Bruce E., and Lee M. Otts. G Company's War: Two Personal Accounts of the Campaigns in Europe, 1944-1945. University of Alabama, 1998. Print. (Two soldiers give their personal accounts of service with the YD in World War II. These two were Mass. Guardsmen that were assigned to serve with the 328th Infantry.)
- Fifield, James H. A History of the 104th U.S. Infantry AEF, 1917–1919. 1946. Print. (Springfield newspaper man wrote this comprehensive history of the 104th Infantry Regiment from the organization in Westfield from the existing Mass. National Guard, through World War I and re-deployment.)
- George, Albert E., and Edwin H. Cooper. Pictorial History of the Twenty-Sixth Division United States Army. Boston: Ball, 1920. Print. (A volume of Signal Corps photographs and a narrative history of the YD in World War I. Includes unit pictures down to the company level and a fold-out panoramic of the entire YD on review at Camp Devens in 1919.)
- Gissen, Max, ed. History of a Combat Regiment, 1639–1945. Salzburg, Austria, 1945. Print. (This is a theater-produced history of the 104th Infantry Regiment in World War II. It was created in Austria during occupation duty in 1945 and copies were distributed to all members of the regiment.)
- Hardin, James N. New York to Oberplan. Nashville: McQuiddey Press, 1946. Print. (A staff officer's view of World War II in Europe with the YD.)
- Historical & Pictorial Review National Guard of the Commonwealth of Massachusetts 1939. Baton Rouge: Army and Navy, 1939. Print. (This large yearbook, was a depression era project of the WPA. It includes a comprehensive historical sketch of the Mass. National Guard, and pictures and individual company histories for each unit.)
- McKinney, Carolyn. The Gentle Giant of the 26th Division. Terra Alta, WV: Headline Books, 1994. Print. (The story of Technical Sergeant 5 Alfred Wilson, a Medal of Honor recipient from the 328th IN of the YD in World War II. It is written by Wilson's niece, based on his letters from the war.)
- Palladino, Ralph A., ed. History of a Combat Regiment 1639-1945. Baton Rouge: Army and Navy, 1960. Print. (This was a re-editing of the theater produced pamphlet of the same name. It was produced for distribution to 104th Infantry Veterans. It uses the same narrative and maps as the 1945 product, but augments them with collected personal photos and U.S. Signal Corps photos to create a yearbook-style history.)
- Passega, General. Le Calvaire De Verdun. Paris: Charled Levauzelle, 1927. Print. (This book is a history of the battles around Verdun in World War I written by the French Corps Commander that commanded the YD during the early campaigns of World War I. It includes descriptions of the actions of the YD in the Toul Sector and the actions of the 104th Infantry at Apremont.)
- Sibley, Frank P. With the Yankee Division in France. Norwood, MA: Little Brown and, 1919. Print. (A Boston newspaper man who served as an "embedded reporter" with the YD from the founding throughout World War I.)
- Stanton, Shelby L. (1991). World War II Order of Battle. Galahad Books. ISBN 0-88365-775-9.
- Taylor, Emerson G. New England in France, 1917–1919. Boston: Houghton Mifflin, 1920. Print. (A narrative history and another of the trio of volumes on the YD in the war published by newspaper men immediately following the war.)
- Westbrook, Stillman F. Those Eighteen Months. Hartford: Case Lockwood and Brainard, 1934. Print. (This is a personal printing of war letters by the commander of the 104th Machine Gun Company in World War I.)
