= Ipswich Camp =

Coordinates: 42.6756°N 70.8269°W

Ipswich Camp was a former infantry and field artillery coastal defense base camp that existed from between May 1942 and November 1943 in Ipswich, Massachusetts, USA. Company L of the 181st Infantry Regiment was stationed at the camp, alongside Battery B of the 211th Field Artillery Battalion, part of the forces of the Eastern Defense Command for defending the United States. The infantry company patrolled between Newburyport and Lynn, while the field artillery battery was located along several earthwork positions along the coast.

== See also ==
- List of military installations in Massachusetts
