= Massachusetts National Guard =

Armed Forces of the Commonwealth of Massachusetts

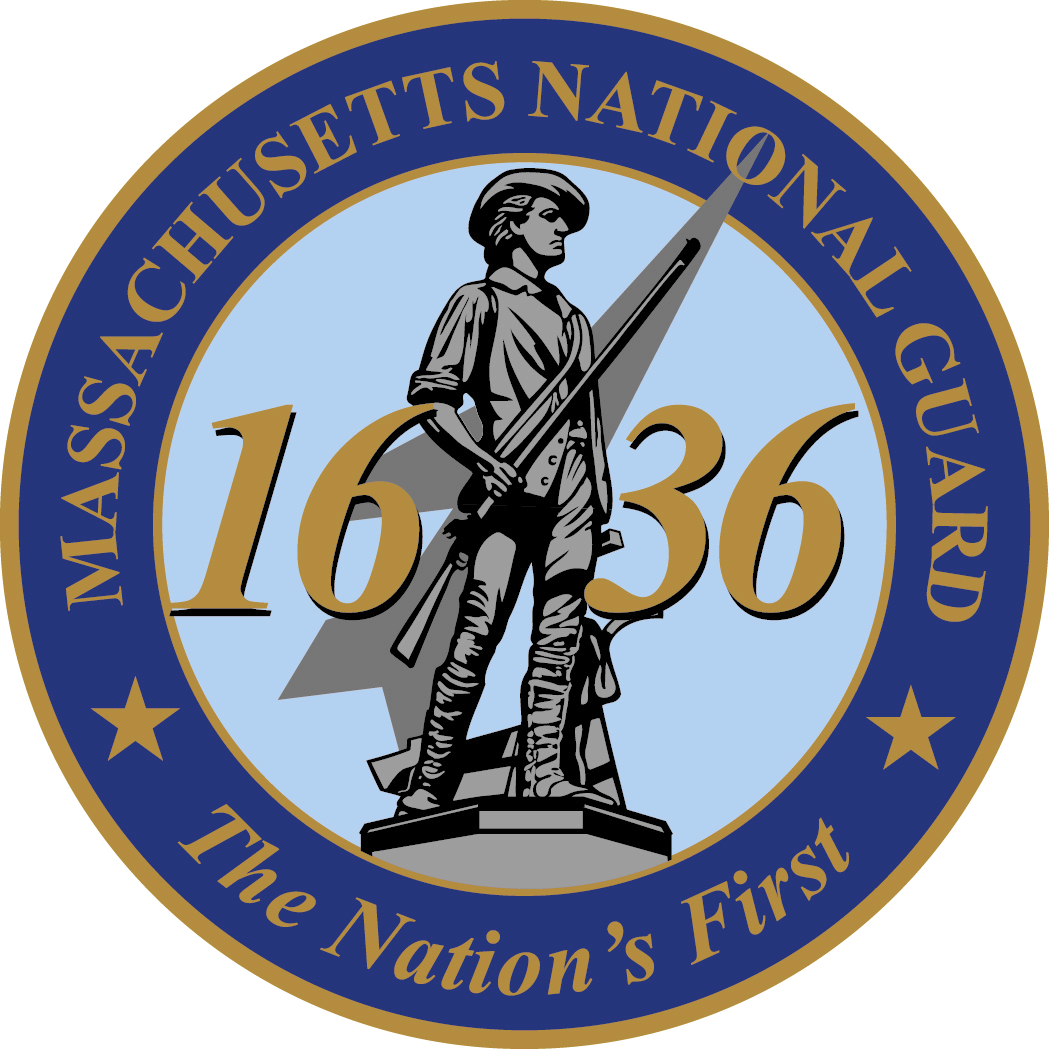
- Seal of the Massachusetts National Guard
- Active: 1636–present (389 years)
- Country: United States of America
- Allegiance: Massachusetts
- Branch: United States Army; United States Air Force; National Guard
- Role: Federal Reserve Force; State Militia (Militia Act of 1903)
- Mottos: (Latin) Ense petit placidam (English: By the sword we seek peace)
- Engagements: Colonial Wars: Pequot War; English Invasion of Acadia (1654); King Philip's War; King William's War; Queen Anne's War; Dummer's War; King George's War; French and Indian War; Revolutionary Period: Boston Campaign; Northern Theater; Nova Scotia Theater; American Wars: War of 1812; American Civil War; * First Bull Run; * Yorktown; * Peninsula Campaign; * Second Bull Run; * Antietam; * Fredericksburg; * Chancellorsville; * Gettysburg; * Wilderness; * Spotsylvania; * Cold Harbor; * Second Battle of Petersburg; * Appomattox; War with Spain; * Puerto Rican Campaign; World War I; * Champagne-Marne; * Aisne-Marne; * Saint-Mihiel; * Meuse-Argonne; World War II; * Northern France; * Rhineland; * Ardennes-Alsace; * Central Europe; Korean War; Afghanistan Campaign; Iraq Campaign
- Decorations: Superior Unit Award (IFOR Service)

Commanders
- Commander in Chief (Title 10 USC): President of the United States (Federalized)
- Commander in Chief (Title 32 USC): Governor of Massachusetts
- Adjutant General: Major General Gary W. Keefe
- State Command Sergeant Major: Command Sergeant Major James L. Campbell Jr.
- Notable commanders: John Winthrop; Myles Standish (Plymouth Company Commander)

Insignia
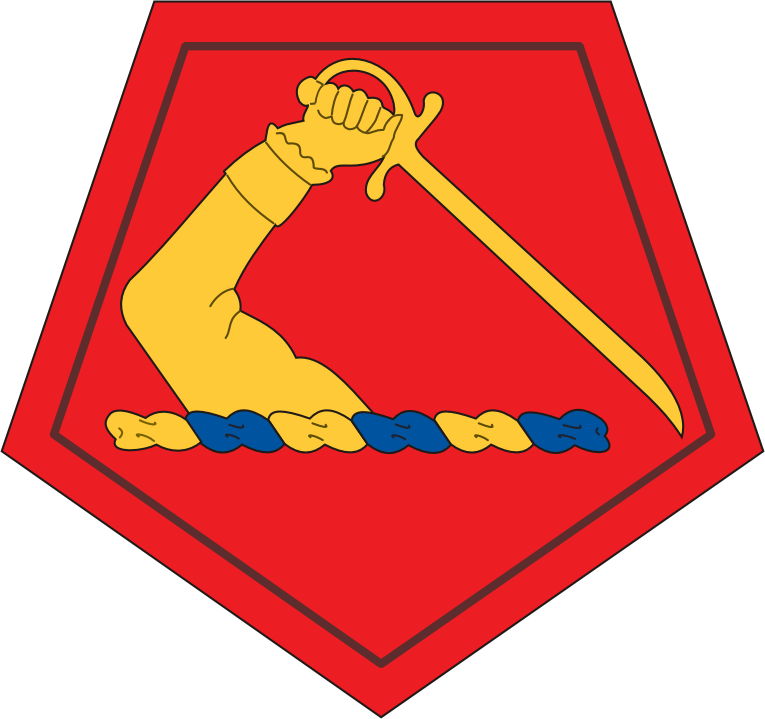
- Massachusetts ARNG Headquarters SSI

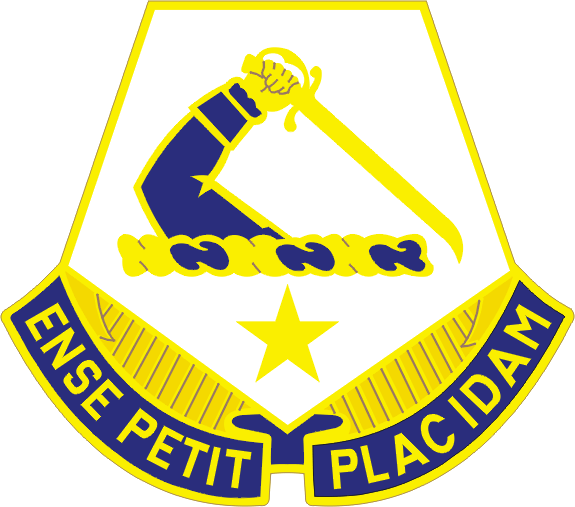
- Massachusetts ARNG Headquarters DUI

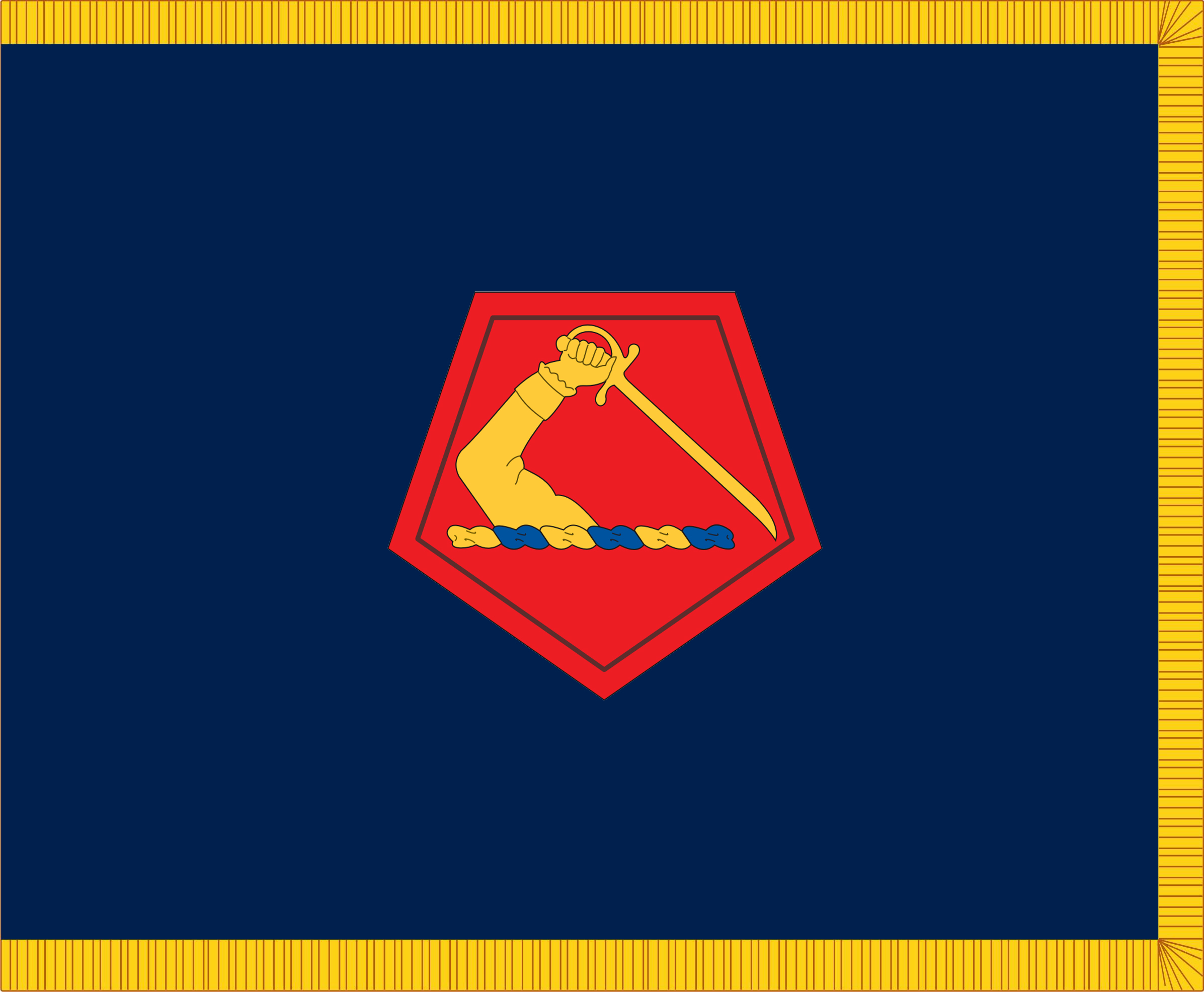
- Massachusetts ARNG Headquarters Flag

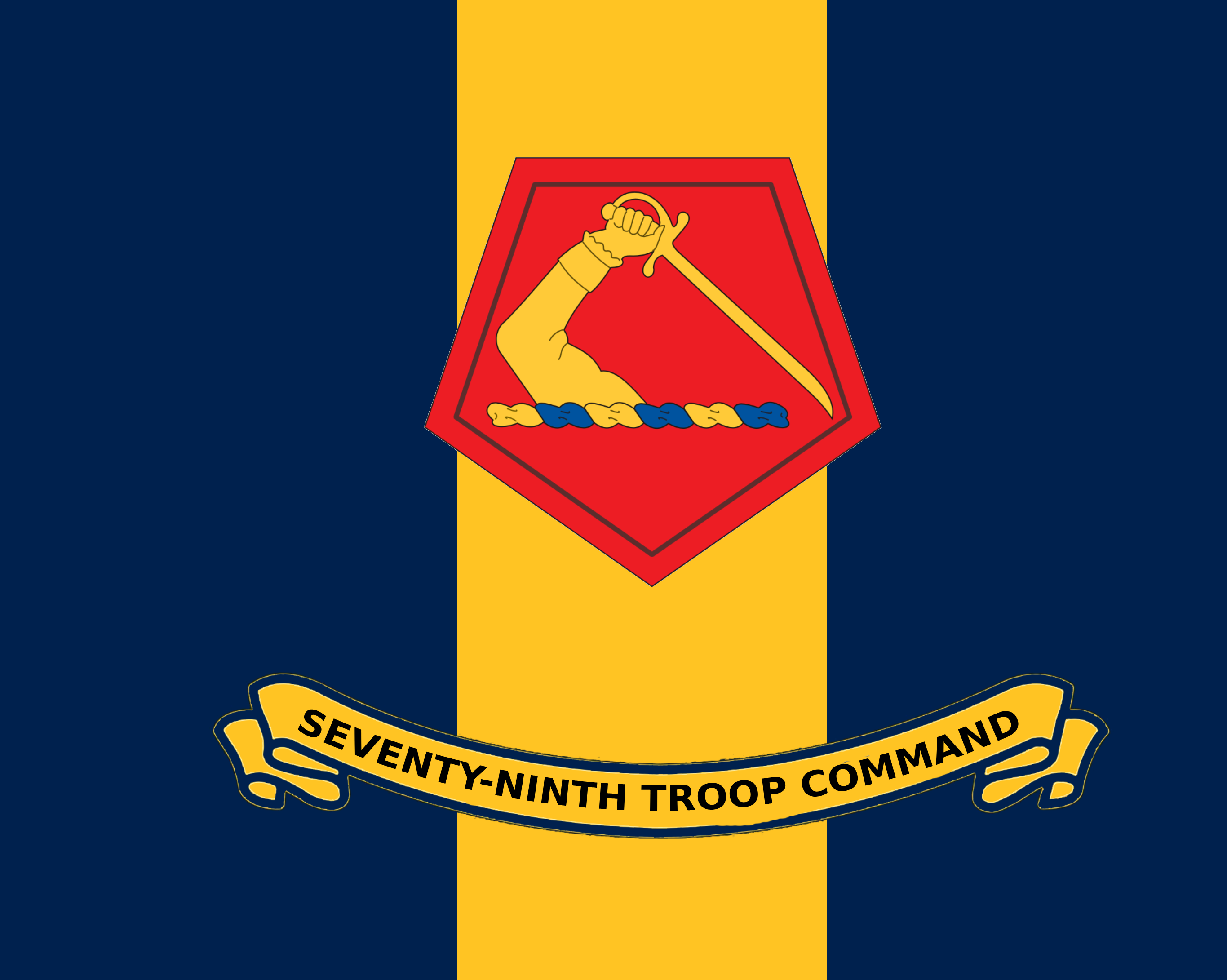
- Massachusetts ARNG 79th Troop Command Flag

- Massachusetts ARNG Crest

The Massachusetts National Guard is the National Guard component for the Commonwealth of Massachusetts. Founded as the Massachusetts Bay Colonial Militia on December 13, 1636, it contains the oldest units in the United States Army. What is today's Massachusetts National Guard evolved through many different forms. Originally founded as a defensive militia for Puritan colonists in the Massachusetts Bay Colony, the militia evolved into a highly organized and armed fighting force. The Massachusetts militia served as a central organ of the New England revolutionary fighting force during the early American Revolution and a major component in the Continental Army under George Washington.

It is currently headquartered at Hanscom Air Force Base and commanded by Major General Gary W. Keefe. Massachusetts National Guard soldiers and airmen are trained and equipped as part of the United States Army and Air Force, and identical ranks and insignias are utilized. National Guardsmen are eligible for all US military awards in addition to state awards. Soldiers and Airmen are held to the same uniform, physical fitness, and marksmanship standards as their Active Duty counterparts.

== History of the Massachusetts Militia and National Guard ==
=== Massachusetts Bay Colony ===
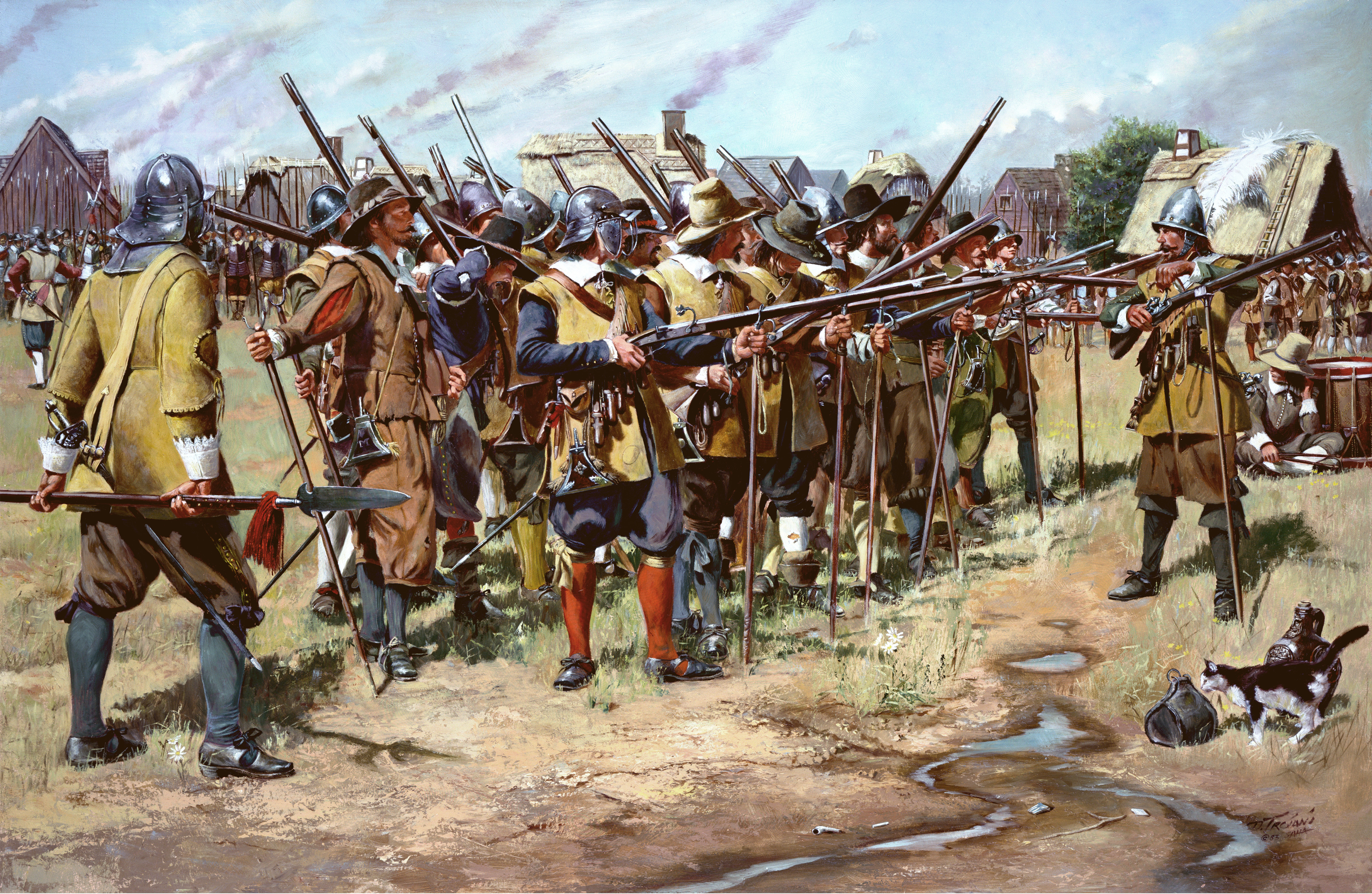
The Massachusetts Bay Colony militia's first muster in Spring 1637

Soon after the founding of the Massachusetts Bay Colony, efforts were made to organize the colony's militia. All male residents between the ages of 16 and 60 were required for service. These militiamen would be well trained and well armed. Each militiaman would be trained in the same manner which was a major difference between the training of Elizabethan militias which maintained well trained units (trainbands) alongside less well trained and less well armed groups of militia. Another major difference between the New England militias and their counterparts in England was these militiamen were allowed to nominate and select their own officers. New England society at the time was organized around congregational lines and this method was to be extended to the militia as well. This nominating process extended all the way to the nomination of province-wide commanders, whose selection needed only General Court assent for outside approval. A company of men had a minimum of 64 soldiers and was to be drilled 6 days a year.

Up until the mid-1630s, each town had its own militia company (also known as "trained bands") which was commanded by an officer with the rank of captain. After December 13, 1636, this changed. That day that the Massachusetts militia was organized into the North, South, and East Regiments. Today's 181st Infantry Regiment, 101st Field Artillery Regiment, and 101st Engineer Battalion (United States) respectively trace their origins to these three regiments. The militia companies were nominally under the command of the colonial governor, but, in practice, operated as independent units. The regimental organization did much to improve the organization and leadership of the militia. Three years later the Hampshire Regiment was raised in Springfield, MA; today's 104th Infantry Regiment traces its origins to that unit.

During King Philip's War (1675-1678), 25 of New England's 90 towns were attacked and pillaged by native tribal warriors and a further 17 colonial towns such as Springfield and Scituate were burnt to the ground. Approximately 3,000 colonists perished. A colonial force of about 1,000 militiamen (mostly from Massachusetts but also from Plymouth Colony and Connecticut) fought a brutal and punishing campaign of reprisal which resulted in the deaths of about 6,000 Native Americans and thousands more being sold into slavery in the West Indies. This war was the bloodiest, in terms of the percentage of the population that died in it, in American history. More than 10% of the total population (native and colonial) of New England perished. The economic, social, and political consequences of King Philip's War (named after the Wampanoag sachem that led them) would echo into the following centuries.

As time progressed, larger towns would usually have more than one militia company and the companies of adjacent towns would be organized into regiments commanded by colonels. The regiments, in turn, were organized into brigades commanded by brigadier generals.

In 1692 Plymouth Colony merged with the Massachusetts Bay Colony and its militia became part of the Massachusetts Militia. The military history of Plymouth Colony began in February 1621 when Captain Myles Standish was named commander of the colony's militia - then consisting of every able bodied adult male in the colony. On October 2, 1658 the militia companies of each town were organized into a regiment under the command of Major Josiah Winslow who served until he was elected governor on June 3, 1673, when he was succeeded by Major William Bradford the Younger. On June 2, 1685, Plymouth Colony was divided into three counties (Plymouth, Barnstable and Bristol) and each county had its own regiment of militia. Upon the merger of the colonies, the Plymouth Colony militia became a brigade within the Massachusetts Militia.

=== American Revolution ===
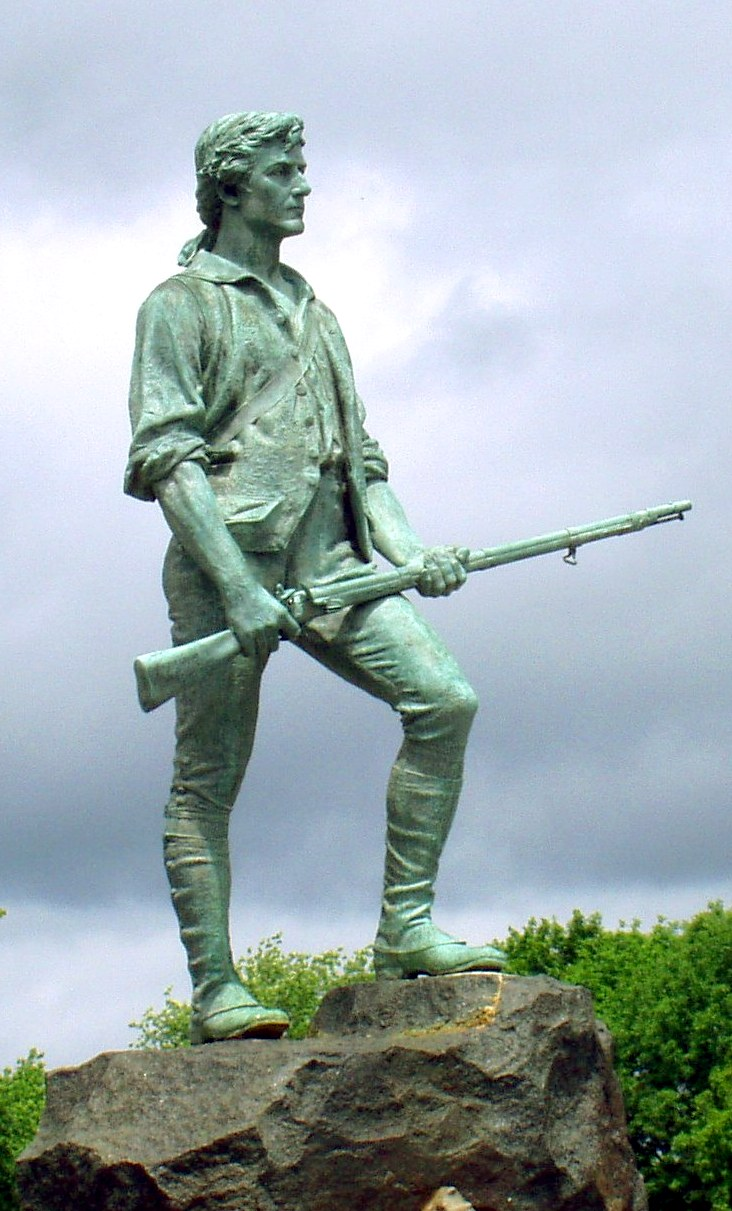
Monument to the minutemen at Lexington, Massachusetts

Prior to the American Revolution, Massachusetts' armed citizens were organized into two major elements. There was the "regular" militia, which consisted of all white males age 16 to 60, and the minutemen who were better trained and equipped and who could react more quickly to an emergency - theoretically on a minute's notice.

In the early morning hours of April 19, 1775, the militia company of Lexington, commanded by Captain John Parker, confronted British forces heading to Concord to search for stores of munitions. This led to the "shot heard round the world" and the beginning of the American Revolution. While the Lexington militia retreated in the face of superior British forces, militiamen continuously engaged the British as they retreated from Concord back to Boston later the same day.

After the battles of Lexington and Concord in April 1775, Massachusetts militia units were called into service, along with militia units from New Hampshire, Connecticut and Rhode Island, to form the Army of Observation whose purpose was to ensure that the British did not travel to locations outside of Boston which they occupied. The Army of Observation fought the British at the Battle of Bunker Hill in June 1775.

General George Washington assumed command of the Army of Observation at Cambridge in July 1775 and the militia units then became units in the newly formed Continental Army. Massachusetts regiments were a major component of the Continental Army throughout the Revolution.

=== War of 1812 ===
During the War of 1812, after the British capture of Eastport and Castine in 1814 there was great concern that they would attack other cities on the New England coast. Massachusetts militia units were called into service to reinforce coastal fortifications protecting Boston and other locations. The 181st Infantry Regiment (United States), 182nd Infantry Regiment (United States), 101st Field Artillery Regiment and the 772nd Military Police Company are four of only twenty Army National Guard units with campaign credit for the War of 1812, as they gained the campaign credit through their antecedent units' service.

=== Militia Law of 1840 ===
The Massachusetts Militia Law of 1840 brought significant changes to the Massachusetts Militia. The first change was that it drew a distinction between the enrolled militia and the volunteer militia. The enrolled militia was simply a list of able bodied men age 18 to 45 which would only be called upon in time of war. There was no military training requirement for members of the enrolled militia.

The volunteer militia, named the Massachusetts Volunteer Militia (MVM) were those individuals who joined MVM and conducted regular training. The MVM was organized into three divisions with two brigades each. Each brigade consisted for two or three regiments. Regiments were organized into companies which would be from one or more municipalities.

=== Mexican War ===
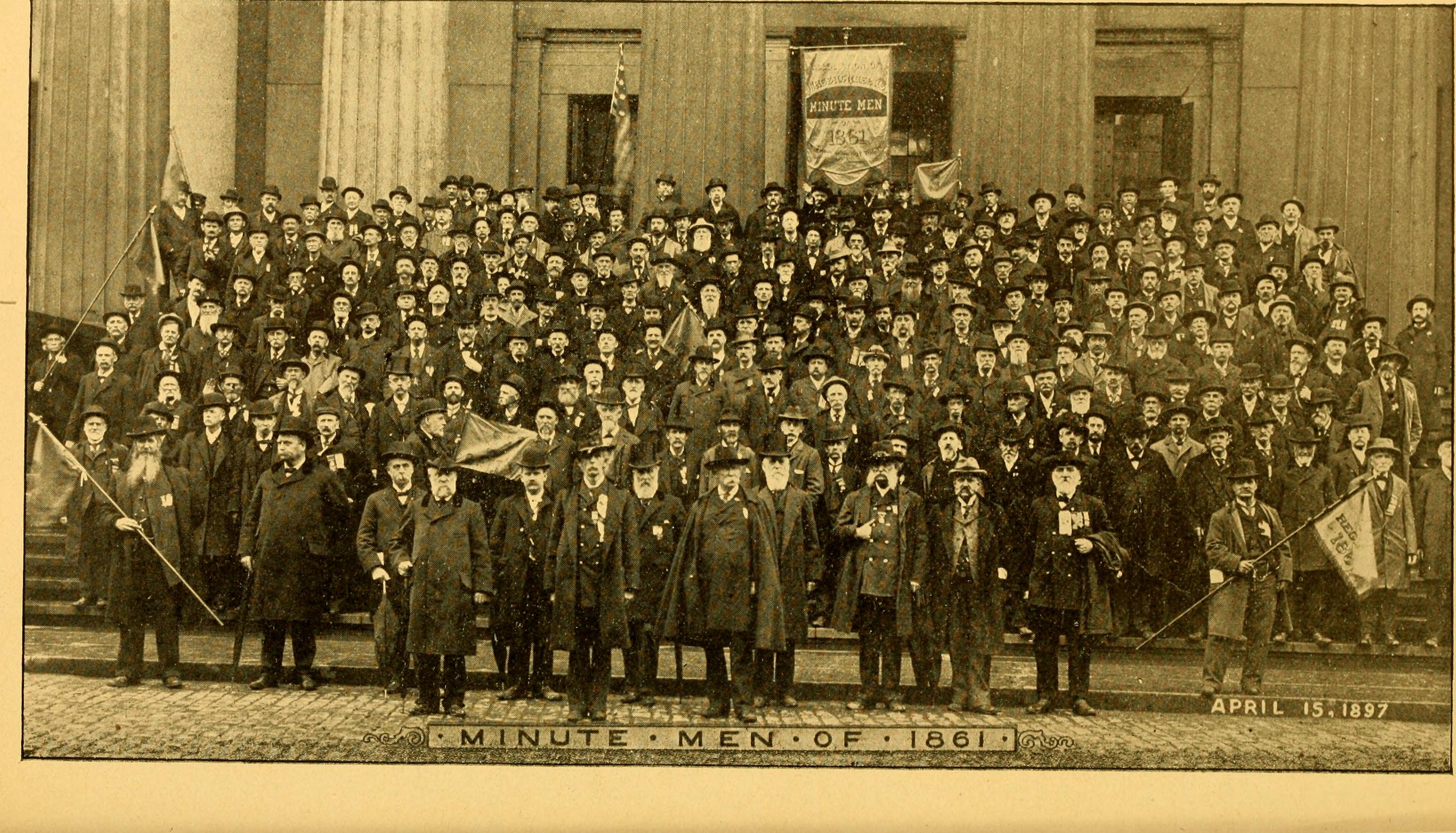
Veterans of the 'Minutemen of 1861', those among the first to answer President Abraham Lincoln's call to arms on April 15, 1861, in a group photograph on the 36th anniversary on April 15, 1897

During the Mexican War the Regiment of Massachusetts Volunteers was formed. It served from January 1847 to July 1848. Its first commander was former congressman and future United States attorney general Caleb Cushing.

=== American Civil War ===
At the beginning of the American Civil War in 1861, Massachusetts Militia units were mobilized to serve in the Union Army. From April to December 1864 at total of 27 Unattached Companies Massachusetts Volunteer Militia were called to active service to garrison coast defense forts in Massachusetts. Most of these companies were drawn from existing units of the Massachusetts Volunteer Militia. Terms of service ranged from 90 days to one year and all of the companies had been demobilized by July 1865.

=== Spanish–American War ===
During the Spanish–American War six Massachusetts Volunteer Militia regiments were called into Federal service between May and July 1898. The regiments were the 2nd, 5th, 6th, 8th and 9th infantry regiments and the 1st Heavy Artillery regiment.

The 2nd, 8th and 9th regiments engaged in combat in Cuba and the 6th saw action in Puerto Rico. All units were demobilized by May 1899.

=== Dick Act of 1903 ===
The Dick Act of 1903 brought into being the National Guard in its current form. In exchange for federal funding, state militia units could join the National Guard with the obligation to serve in the event of a federal emergency.

The name National Guard was applied to units receiving Federal financing and subject to Federal mobilization and regulation. The primary result of the Dick Act was that the state militias were transformed into better trained, better equipped and more professional military forces.

The National Defense Act of 1916 built upon the Dick Act by requiring National Guard units to increase their number of annual training assemblies (commonly called "drills") from 24 to 48 and the number of annual training days from 5 to 15.

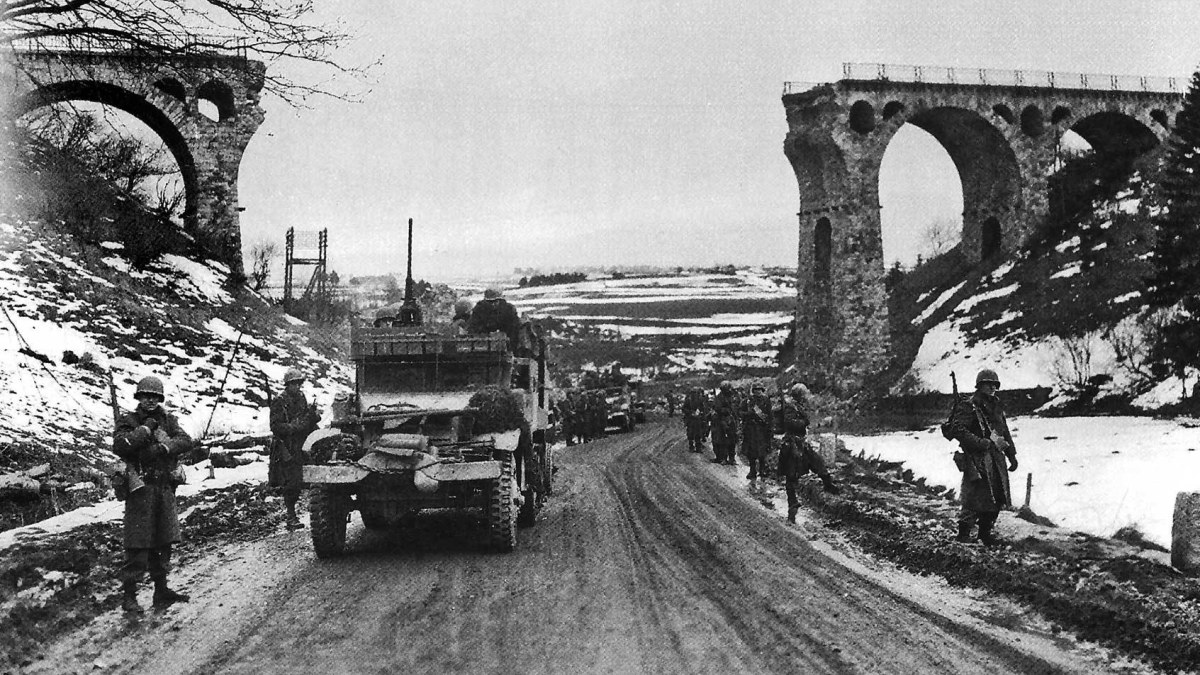
Massachusetts National Guardsmen north of Bütgenbach, Belgium during World War II

The result of these reforms is that when National Guard units were called into Federal service during the First World War, they were better prepared than their forebears in previous wars.

=== World War I ===
During the First World War, the 26th Division (nicknamed the "Yankee Division") was formed from units of Massachusetts National Guard. The division spent 210 days in combat and participated in the St. Mihele and Meuse-Argonne offensives. Additionally, Guard units were mobilized for coastal defense at forts in the Boston and New Bedford areas.

After the First World War, the 110th Cavalry Regiment, still horsed cavalry, was established. It was assigned in the 1920s to the 23rd and then after July 1924 to the 22nd Cavalry Division. From May to October 1940 the regiment was broken up and reorganized as coastal and field artillery.

=== World War II ===
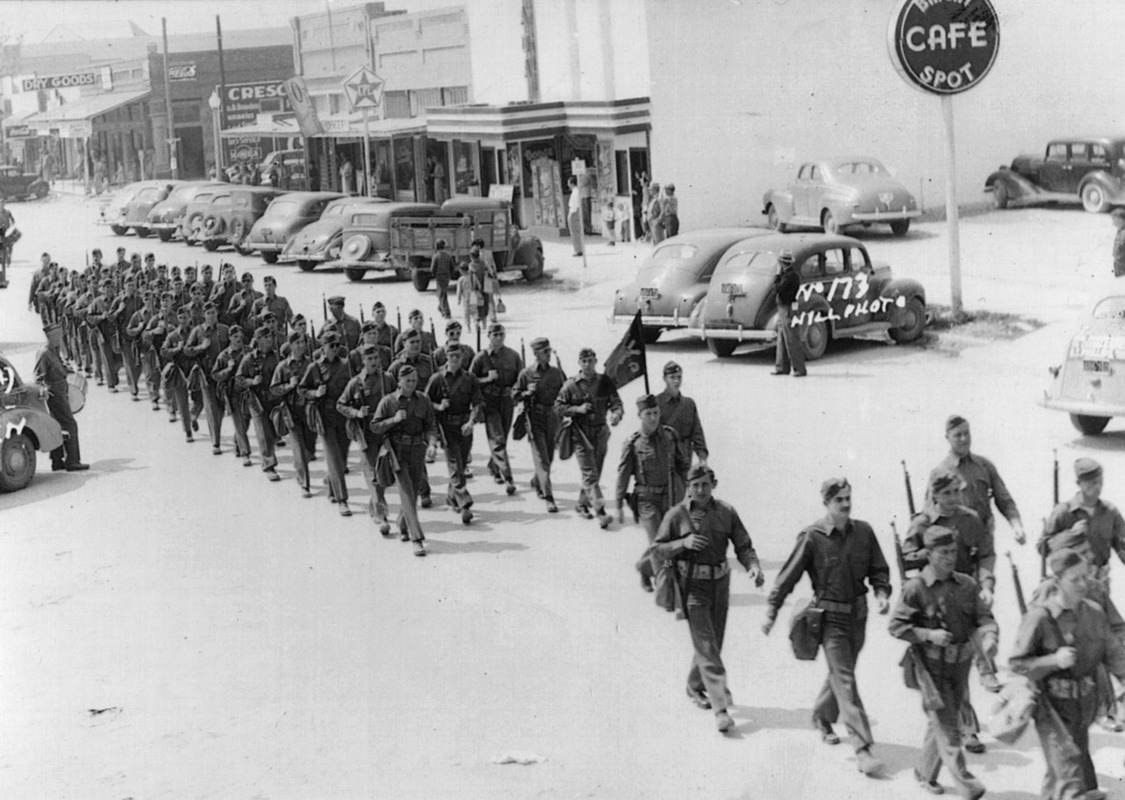
Soldiers of the 211th Anti-Aircraft, Massachusetts National Guard in mobilization training for World War II in Texas

As in the First World War, Massachusetts National Guard units were called into Federal service. Most units were either in the 26th Infantry Division or the 241st Coast Artillery. The 241st Coast Artillery was disestablished in 1944. The 181st Infantry Regiment patrolled the coasts of Massachusetts and other locations in New England.

=== Post–World War II ===
The Massachusetts Army National Guard reorganized in 1946 after five years of active duty. The 26th Infantry Division was the largest formation; however, there were now two major non-divisional units in the state: the 182d Infantry Regimental Combat Team and the 104th Antiaircraft Artillery Brigade. The Guard was still in the process of rebuilding when the Korean War broke out in June 1950. The 26th Division was considered for active duty, but eight non-divisional units were ordered into active duty as part of the Army's expansion instead. In 1963 the 26th Cavalry was created to provide the divisional reconnaissance squadron.

During the Vietnam era (1965-1972) service in the National Guard was used by tens of thousands of men as a means of avoiding being drafted into the active Army and, probably, being sent to fight in Vietnam. While this enabled the National Guard to fill its personnel requirements there was a diminishing of readiness as many members of the Guard had a low level of motivation for military service.

In the early 1980s the National Guard received more Federal funding and evolved into a better trained, better equipped and more professional force. The National Guard was in a high state of readiness when units were activated to serve in the Gulf War of 1990 to 1991.

The end of the Cold War resulted in force restructuring and reductions. As a result, the Army decided to downsize the 26th Infantry Division into a brigade, and put it under the command of the 29th Infantry Division. On 1 September 1993, the division was inactivated, and the 26th Infantry Brigade remained in its place, based in Springfield. The 3rd and 43rd brigades, 26th Infantry Division were inactivated, and the 86th Infantry Brigade was put under the command of the 42nd Infantry Division. On 1 October 1995, the brigade was formally designated the 26th Brigade, 29th Infantry Division. The divisional cavalry was retitled into the 110th Cavalry, but then disestablished in 1996.

In 2004, the 26th Brigade transitioned into the 26th (Yankee) Infantry Brigade Combat Team.

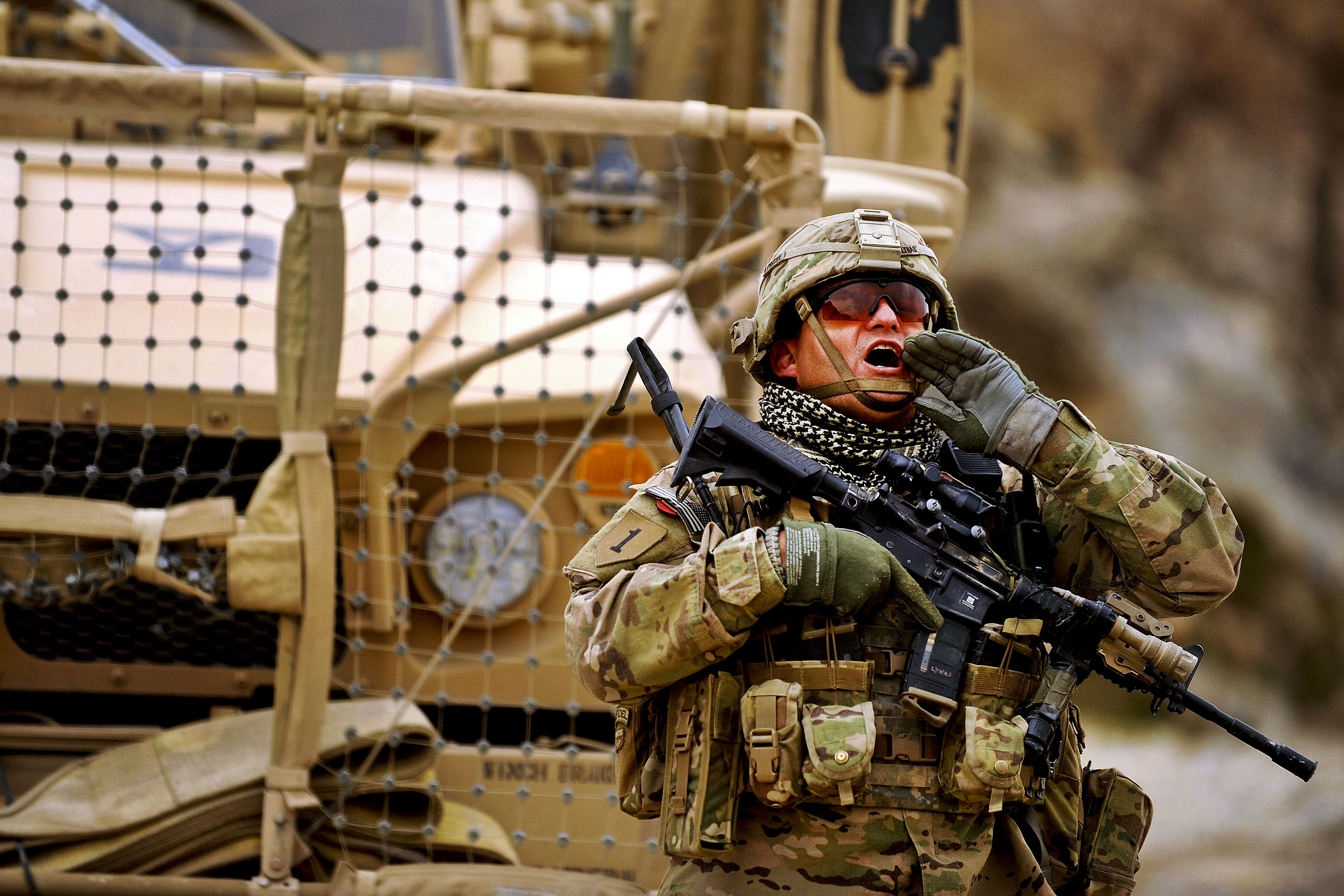
A SSG of the 182nd Infantry Regiment during deployment in Afghanistan

=== Post-9/11 era ===
Numerous Massachusetts National Guard units have been called into Federal service to serve in both Operation Enduring Freedom in Afghanistan from 2001 to 2021 and in Operation Iraqi Freedom in Iraq from 2003 to 2011.

In 2005 the 26th Infantry Brigade was reorganized into the 26th Infantry Brigade Combat Team, 42nd Infantry Division. In 2008, the 26th IBCT was reorganized as the 26th Maneuver Enhancement Brigade (MEB), a combat support brigade, located at Camp Curtis Guild, MA.

In 2005 the long-serving 104th Infantry Regiment was inactivated, followed by the 102nd Field Artillery Regiment in 2006.

On October 29, 2007, Major Jeffrey R. Calero was killed in Kajaki, Afghanistan by a roadside bomb during a combat patrol. He was part of Company C, 1st Battalion, 20th Special Forces Group.

== Organization and missions ==
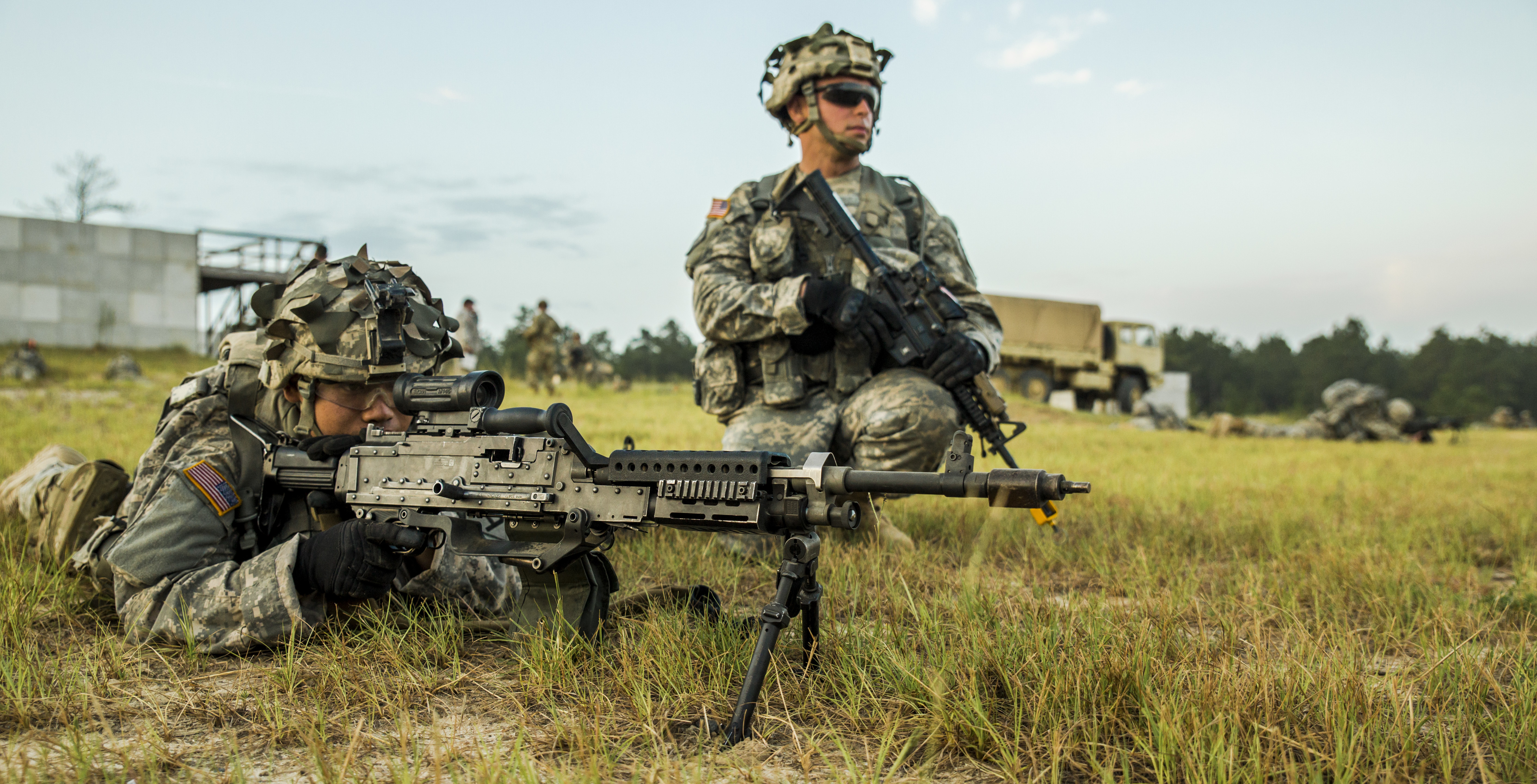
Massachusetts National Guardsmen during Annual Training (JRTC, Fort Polk, Louisiana)

The Massachusetts National Guard is divided into the Massachusetts Army National Guard and the Massachusetts Air National Guard. Officers in the Guard hold two commissions - one from the governor of Massachusetts and the other from the president of the United States. This emphasizes the Guard's dual role as both and state and national military force.

In its mission as a state organization, the National Guard can be called on by the governor to assist in national disasters and public safety emergencies. In its national role, the National Guard can be mobilized for active service with the United States Armed Forces. Units of the Massachusetts National Guard have been mobilized during the First World War, Second World War, Korean War, Gulf War, the War in Iraq and Operation Enduring Freedom in Afghanistan.

The National Guard is technically commanded by the governor, who is assisted by the state adjutant general when not federalized, who holds the rank of major general. National Guard members, as with all other Reserve Components, train one weekend a month and conducts Annual Training (15–30 days).

The now deactivated Massachusetts State Defense Force (MSDF) was a state military force which could be mobilized by the governor to augment the National Guard. The MSDF was composed of former members of the United States Armed Forces who live in Massachusetts and serve on a voluntary basis unless called to active duty. The MSDF's three major specialties were administrative support, professional support and medical support. Upon entering office in 2016 Governor Baker declined to sign the re-authorization bill concerning the guard and it was deactivated.

=== COVID-19 Pandemic Response efforts ===
The Massachusetts National Guard has helped to administrate the COVID-19 vaccine in places such as Springfield, East Boston, and Danvers to civilians.

Up to 250 members of the Massachusetts National Guard were activated and trained to drive school transport vans, known as 7D vehicles after a mass shortage of bus drivers due to the COVID-19 pandemic.

=== Units of the Massachusetts Army National Guard ===
Camp Edwards in the Massachusetts Military Reservation, Cape Cod, Massachusetts is the major training site for Army National Guard units. Armories for the MA ARNG include Hudson Armory. Current units of the Massachusetts Army National Guard include the following:

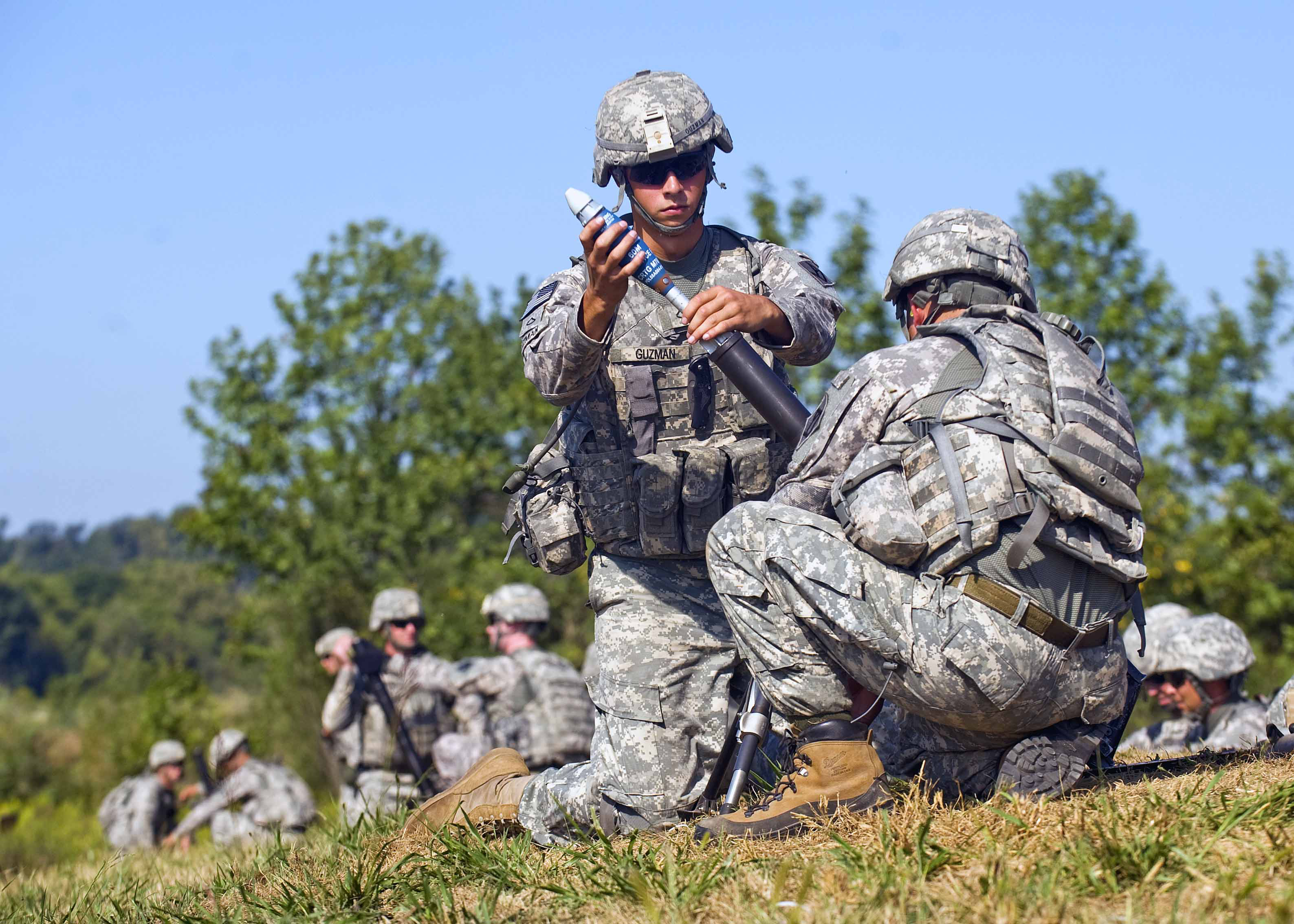
Troops of the 181st Infantry Regiment preparing to fire mortars

- Headquarters and Headquarters Company
- 26th Maneuver Enhancement Brigade
  - 101st Engineer Battalion
  - 211th Military Police Battalion ("First Corps of Cadets")
- 101st Field Artillery Regiment
- 151st Regional Support Group
  - 164th Transportation Battalion
  - 3rd Battalion, 126th Aviation Regiment
  - D Company, 223rd Military Intelligence Battalion
- 1st Battalion, 181st Infantry Regiment (part of 44th Infantry Brigade Combat Team, NJ Army National Guard (ARNG))
- 1st Battalion, 182nd Infantry Regiment (Part of 27th Infantry Brigade Combat Team, New York ARNG)
- Company C, 1st Battalion, 20th Special Forces Group
- 126th Cyber Protection Battalion, [[91st Cyber Brigade]]
- 101st Regiment (Regional Training Institute)
- 54th Massachusetts Volunteer Regiment

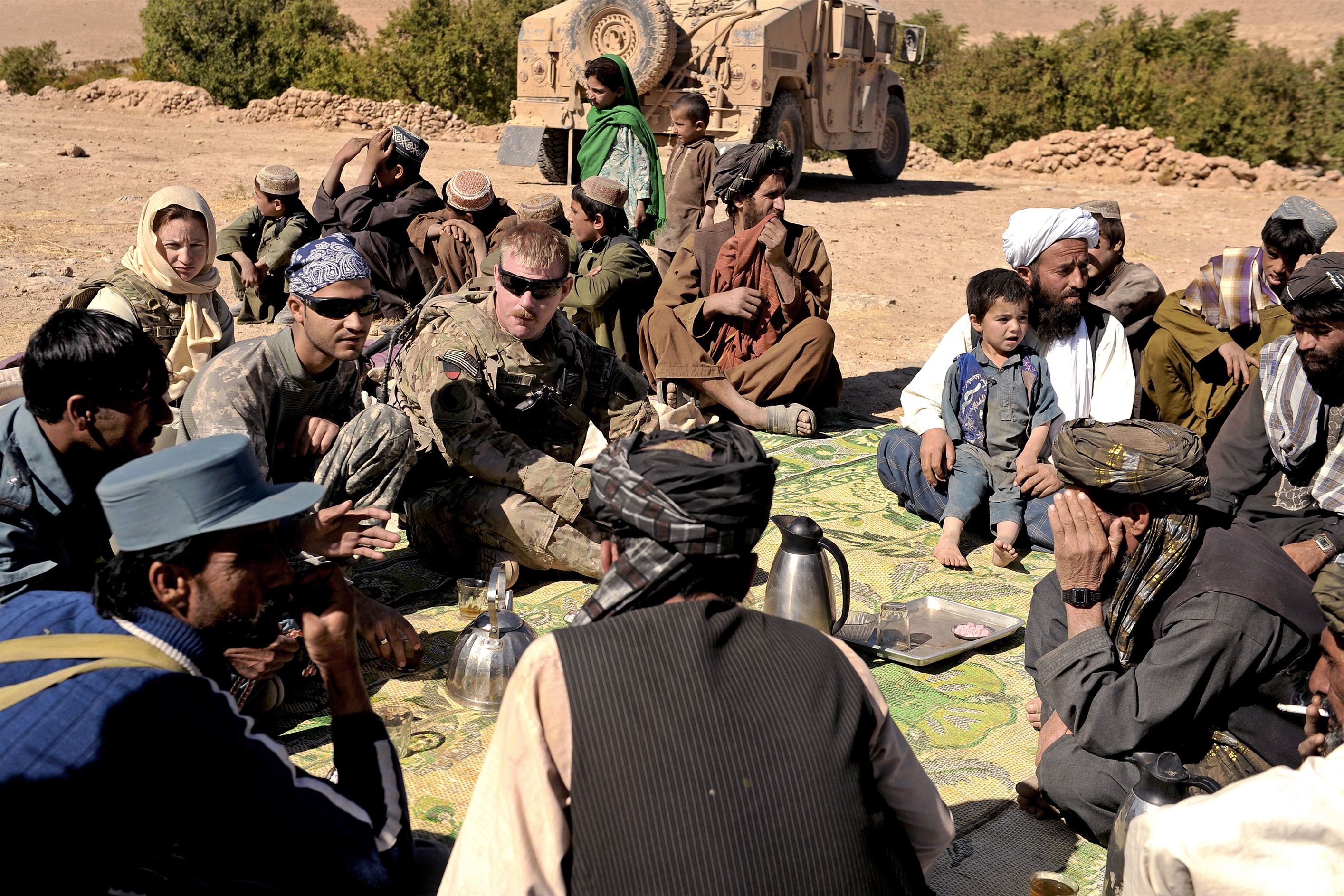
A Specialist of the Massachusetts National Guard from the 182d Infantry with Afghan police

Former Units:

- 101st Infantry Regiment (1798)
- 104th Infantry Regiment

=== Massachusetts Air National Guard ===
Otis Air National Guard Base and Barnes Air National Guard Base are the major Massachusetts Air National Guard bases.

== Massachusetts National Guard Museum and Archives ==
The Massachusetts National Guard Museum and Archives is located in the armory in Concord, Massachusetts (not the historic Concord Armory.)

== See also ==
- Massachusetts Naval Militia
- National Lancers
