= 104th Infantry Regiment (United States) =

United States Army unit

- Coat of arms
- Active: 1639–2005
- Country: United States of America
- Branch: United States Army
- Type: Infantry regiment
- Motto: Fortitude et Courage
- Anniversaries: 14 November 1639
- Engagements: King Philip's War; *Battle of Bloody Brook; French and Indian War; Revolutionary War; *Battle of Bunker Hill; American Civil War; *Battle of Gettysburg; *Battle of Spotslvania; Spanish–American War; World War I *Battle of Bois Brule; World War II; *Battle of the Bulge; Bosnia and Herzegovina

Insignia
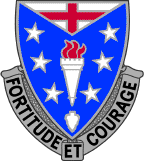
- Distinctive unit insignia

The 104th Infantry Regiment traces its history to 14 November 1639, when it was first mustered as the Springfield Train Band in Springfield, Massachusetts. In 1662 the unit was formed into the Hampshire Regiment of the Massachusetts Militia. It later served in the Continental Army during the American Revolution, with Union forces in the American Civil War, and as a federalized Massachusetts National Guard regiment with the U.S. Army during Spanish–American War, Mexican Border Campaign, World War I and World War II. In 2005, the last active element of the regiment, the 1st Battalion, was inactivated and consolidated with the 1st Battalion, 181st Infantry Regiment.

== Heraldic items ==
=== Coat of arms ===
- Blazon:
  - Shield: Per chevron and enhanced Argent and Azure, in chief a cross Gules, between six mullets pilewise a crenelated torch of the first flamant of three of the third, and in base an Indian arrowhead point to base of the first.
  - Crest: That for the regiments of the Massachusetts National Guard: On a wreath of the colors Argent and Azure a dexter arm embowed clothed Blue and ruffed White Proper the hand grasping a broad sword Argent the pommel and hilt Or.
  - Motto: FORTITUDE ET COURAGE (Fortitude and Courage).
- Symbolism:
1. The shield is white and blue – the old and the present Infantry colors.
2. Indian Wars and disturbances are indicated by the Indian arrowhead.
3. The cross of St. George recalls Revolutionary War service.
4. The "per chevron" division of the shield represents the "Bloody Angle" at Spotsylvania during the Civil War.
5. The crenelated portion of the torch is representative of Spanish War service.
6. The torch was a device painted on the 104th Infantry Regiment equipment during World War I for easy identification, the three flames representing the three centuries of existence of the 104th Infantry Regiment.
7. The six mullets symbolize the six major engagements during World War I.
- Background:
1. The coat of arms was originally approved for the 104th Infantry Regiment on 1926-11-05.
2. It was redesignated for the 104th Infantry Regiment on 1961-04-08 under the Combat Arms Regimental System (CARS).

=== Distinctive unit insignia ===
- Description:
1. A silver color metal and enamel device 1 1/8 inches (2.9 cm) in height consisting of a shield blazoned: Per chevron and enhanced Argent and Azure, in chief a cross Gules, between six mullets pilewise a crenelated torch of the first flamant of three of the third, and in base an Indian arrowhead point to base of the first.
2. Attached below the shield a motto scroll inscribed FORTITUDE ET COURAGE in black letters.
- Symbolism: The insignia is the shield and motto of the coat of arms of the 104th Infantry.
- Background:
1. The distinctive unit insignia was originally approved on 1926-11-04 for the 104th Infantry Regiment.
2. It was redesignated for the 104th Infantry Regiment on 1961-04-08, under the Combat Arms Regimental System (CARS).
3. The insignia was amended on 1968-06-19 to include the motto scroll.

== History ==
=== Formation and Colonial operations ===
First formed on 14 November 1639 as the Springfield Train Band, at Springfield, Massachusetts. This original band trained on the highlands, which George Washington later selected as the site of the United States National Armory.

Organized on 7 May 1662 as part of the Massachusetts Militia from several existing Western Massachusetts training bands, and named The Hampshire Regiment because the majority of Western Massachusetts – including the region's de facto capital, Springfield – was, at the time, located within Hampshire County (After the American Revolution, Hampshire County was split into three separate counties, currently administered by two different New England states – Hampden County, Massachusetts, with a capital at the City of Springfield; Hartford County, Connecticut, with a capital at the City of Hartford, and the current Hampshire County, Massachusetts, with a capital at the college town of Northampton).

The Hampshire Regiment expanded on 16 November 1748 to form the 1st (South) Hampshire Regiment (i.e. near Springfield,) and the 2nd (North) Hampshire Regiment, (i.e. near Northampton and west.)

The 1st Hampshire Regiment expanded on 1 January 1763 to form the 1st Hampshire Regiment (near Springfield,) and the Berkshire Regiment, (Northampton and west, encompassing the relatively recently settled Berkshires.)

=== Massachusetts Army and the American Revolution ===
The Hampshire Regiment formed the following Massachusetts Militia units on 27 May 1775 for service at Boston: Danielson's Battalion., Fellows' Battalion, Patterson's Battalion. and Woodbridge's Battalion.

1st and 2nd Hampshire Regiments and Berkshire Regiment reorganized 29 November 1792 as the 9th Division. (Hampshire and Berkshire) Volunteer Light Infantry Companies. These companies serve as the light and flank companies for the Massachusetts Line.

During the American Revolution (1775–1783) the Hampshire Regiment formed the following Continental Army units: 1st Massachusetts Regiment, 13th Massachusetts Regiment, Porter's Regiment.

Flank (Volunteer Militia) companies in Federal Service September–October 1814 as elements of the Elite Brigade at Boston.

9th Division, reorganized 1 July 1834 to consist of the Regiment of Light Infantry (Volunteer Militia).

Regiment of Light Infantry reorganized and redesignated 24 April 1840 in the Massachusetts Volunteer Militia as the 10th Regiment of Light Infantry

=== Civil War ===
Redesignated 26 February 1855 as the 10th Regiment of Infantry.

Mustered into Federal Service 21 June 1861 at Springfield, Massachusetts, as the 10th Massachusetts Volunteer Infantry Regiment; mustered out of Federal service 6 July 1864 at Springfield.

Reorganized 11 November 1868 in the Massachusetts Volunteer Militia as the 2nd Regiment of Infantry.

=== World War I ===
Shortly after the United States declared war on Germany in April 1917 the regiment was mustered into Federal service and designated as the 104th Infantry Regiment. The 104th was assigned to the 26th Division (nicknamed the Yankee Division) which was formed from National Guard units from New England.

Regarding the United States in World War I, on 10, 12 and 13 April 1918, the lines being held by the troops of the 104th Infantry Regiment, of the 52d Infantry Brigade, of the 26th "Yankee" Division, in Bois Brule, near Apremont in the Ardennes, were heavily bombarded and attacked by the Germans. At first the Germans secured a foothold in some advanced trenches which were not strongly held but, thereafter, sturdy counterattacks by the 104th Infantry—at the point of the bayonet and in hand-to-hand combat—succeeded in driving the enemy out with serious losses, entirely re-establishing the American line.

For its gallantry the 104th Infantry was cited in a general order of the French 32nd Army Corps on 26 April 1918. In an impressive ceremony occurring in a field near Boucq on 28 April 1918, the 104th Infantry's regimental flag was decorated with the Croix de Guerre by French General Fenelon F.G. Passaga. "I am proud to decorate the flag of a regiment which has shown such fortitude and courage," he said. "I am proud to decorate the flag of a nation which has come to aid in the fight for liberty." Thus, the 104th Infantry became the very first American unit to be honored by a foreign country for exceptional bravery in combat. In addition, 117 members of the 104th Infantry received the award, including its commander, Colonel George H. Shelton.

According to The New York Times, in July 1918 "it was the lot of the Americans [which involved the 104th Infantry Regiment] to drive the Germans back in the region lying north of Chateau-Thierry." The offensive operations of the U.S. 26th Division and 104th Regiment at Chateau Thierry were complicated—the problem being to transition at once from defensive to offensive warfare. "This involved continuous movement under the most hazardous and confusing conditions and included every unit of the [104th] regiment. In the eight days from July 18 to July 25, 1918, the 104th Infantry was to pass through a crucible of fire and steel. Its men were to write sagas of sacrifice, devotion and heroism. In the stress of one of the great, decisive battles in world history, many of these acts failed of proper recognition. It is safe to say that almost without exception, every man of the [104th] regiment was deserving of mention for meritorious conduct during those terrible July days."

"By July 4 [1918], the entire [26th] Division moved up to the front in the area also known as the Pas Fini Sector ('Unfinished Sector'), where the 52nd Infantry Brigade relieved the U.S. Marine Brigade from the area of Belleau Wood and Torcy as far to the northwest as Bussiares on the left side of the line. The relief was completed on July 9 [1918] following delays due to defensive preparations for an expected German attack. [The] 52nd Brigade HQ was established at La Loge Farm, and the 26th Division HQ was moved up to Chamigny. There were no trenches in the area of the front, little wire and no shelters (dugouts). Rather, defenses were designed for open warfare and consisted of shallow fox-holes covered with brush, positioned to provide mutually supporting fire along with numerous machine gun positions. The outpost line and principal resistance line were separated by a 1,000 yard artillery barrage zone designed to break up any attack that overran the outposts. Occupants of the outposts had the usual mission of fighting to the last man with no hope of reinforcement. At all hours, troops of the outpost line were fired on by machine guns and artillery of the German 7th Army. Food and water had to be carried to the forward troops by ration details through machine gun fire under cover of darkness. The troops suffered a high number of casualties due to heavy gas exposure. Belleau Wood itself was a forest of horror from the hard fighting earlier in June [1918] involving the Marines; equipment, unburied bodies and severed limbs were found still strewn everywhere and hanging in trees with the smell of death and decay heavy in the air."

"From July 9–14 [1918], 10,350 high explosive shells fell on the 52nd Brigade sector killing 14 and wounding 84. In rain and fog at midnight on July 14 [1918], the entire 26th Division front was heavily shelled with a combination of high explosive and gas. Another day-long enemy bombardment occurred across the entire Divisional sector on July 15 [1918], drenching it with mustard gas. On July 16–17 [1918] another 7,000 rounds of high explosive fell in the Divisional sector. Despite the relentless bombardments by German artillery, no major infantry engagements occurred."

On 17 July 1918, "the 26th Division was the only thing between the Boches and the open road to Paris. The position of the Twenty-sixth Division was as follows: the extreme right was held by the 101st Infantry, facing north. The 102d Infantry lay along a roll of hills, its line extending a little beyond Bouresches; the regiment facing almost east. The 104th was in the Belleau Wood, facing east and northeast, and the 103d Infantry, north of Lucy de Bocage, faced north and northeast on [the Americans'] extreme left. One battalion of artillery was in position in the fields right and left of the Paris-Metz road; another, out on [the Americans'] left flank, was on the line Champillon-Voie du Chatel. [T]he attack was ordered for 4:35 a.m. [of July 18, 1918]. Only six hours was given to make out Division orders, get them to the various regiments, and get the units in position for the jumping-off hour." Shortly after H-hour sounded, "[a] severe fire dropped by the enemy artillery on the [104th in Belleau Wood]. Nobody dreamed that the encounters [beginning on July 18, 1918] had marked a turning-point of the war—that with the forward rush on that brilliant morning."

"Also known to historians as the Second Battle of the Marne, the Aisne-Marne Offensive began on July 18, 1918, with a combined French and American attack on the German forces (7th Army) inside the St. Mihiel Salient. The 52nd Infantry Brigade [including the 104th Infantry Regiment] attacked along the 26th Division’s line from Bouresches to the left of the Division sector. The 52nd Brigade's initial objective was to take the Torcy-Belleau-Givry Railroad from Givry to Bouresches." "...the days succeeding July 18th showed us how deadly our fire had been. Lucy-le-Bocage and Vaux were laid flat by the Boche, Belleau Woods was a shattered, stinking horror, and all the traveled roads were hell...."

"The advance continued on July 21 [1918] as the German Army fell back across a broad front in a general retreat. [There was] stiff German resistance along the "Berta Line" in the area of Epieds, which included orders for enemy artillery to contaminate the front line with mixed gas of all types." "Epieds is reached by a valley from the south through which runs the main road. North of Epieds is a wooded hill, and to the west similar hills at the lower end of the Bois de Chatelet, and to the east other hills up to the northern end of the Boise de Trungy."

The entire 52nd Brigade, including the 104th Regiment, attacked Epieds twice on 22 July 1918, only to be pushed back both times with heavy casualties from German machine gun fire. "Overnight more than 1,000 artillery shells fell on the 52nd Brigade's Command Post and the next day the 52nd was again repulsed in a third attack against Epieds, the vigorous defense of which proved to be a rear-guard holding action by the enemy while the main German forces withdrew." During the afternoon of 23 July 1918, the 104th Regiment went up the ravine by the side of the road into the village. "They were swept by fire from more than a hundred machine guns the Germans placed on the hills about the village. [The 104th] got into the village. Soon the Germans got the range and began heavily shelling Epieds and [the 104th] withdrew to the hills, the Germans taking possession of the village under the protection of artillery fire and bringing in more machine guns."

On the morning of 24 July 1918, the 104th Regiment again faced the task of retaking Epieds. "While a small force stayed in front, drawing the fire of the Germans from the village and hills, [the other troops of the 104th] moved against the machine gunners from the rear. The troops [of the 104th] in front of the village and on both sides attacked together, forcing the Germans to evacuate quickly." "Of the fighting here the French Communique [of the evening of July 24, 1918] said: 'Fierce combats were fought in the sector of Epieds. Those combats, bloody and severe, were fought by Americans whose indomitable energy the Germans fell back [on the afternoon of July 24, 1918] giving [the Americans] an average advance of three kilometers'. While the actual advance was not marked by such bitter fighting, it was the fierce combats up to [the morning of July 24, 1918] which resulted in the advance." The New York Times, in a caption for its related news article, proclaimed that the "Capture of Epieds [was] a Test of Fighting Quality Under the Hardest Conditions." "In a week of fighting the 26th Division had captured 17 kilometers of ground in the first real advance made by an American division as a unit, but at a cost of 20% casualties (the greatest number of battle casualties it would experience in a single operation). Counted among the Division’s casualties were 1,930 gas cases." "The fight for Epieds was one of the most severe and costly in which the Americans have engaged."

"The 104th continued to fight with courage and valor until the end of the war. It had taken part in six major campaigns: Chemin Des Dames, Apremont, Campagne-Marne, Aisne Marne, St. Mihiel, and Meuse-Argonne". While "Over There" in France, the men of the 104th Infantry Regiment experienced some of the heaviest fighting and suffered the greatest number of casualties of the U.S. 26th Division. "With the end of the war, the men of the 104th returned home and became citizen-soldiers once again."

=== Interwar period ===
The 104th Infantry arrived at the port of Boston on 4 April 1919 on the USS Mount Vernon and was demobilized on 29 April 1919 at Camp Devens. Per the terms of the National Defense Act of 1920, the 104th Infantry was reconstituted in the National Guard in 1921, assigned to the 26th Division, and allotted to the state of Massachusetts. The regiment was reorganized by redesignation of the 2nd Infantry, Massachusetts National Guard (organized 1919–21; headquarters organized 22 June 1921 and federally recognized at Springfield, Massachusetts), on 30 September 1921. The regiment, or elements thereof, were called up to perform the following state duties: flood relief at Springfield in November 1927; flood relief at Springfield, 4 April–19 May 1936; hurricane relief at Cape Cod in September 1938. The regiment conducted annual summer training most years at Camp Devens, 1921–34 and at the Massachusetts Military Reservation at Falmouth, Massachusetts, 1936–38.

=== World War II ===
"In September 1940, the first peacetime conscription in the history of the United States was begun. On January 16, 1941, the 26th "Yankee Division" was brought into Federal service for a supposed one year of duty. The 104th as part of the division was mobilized at Camp Edwards on Cape Cod, Mass. Draftees built up the unit to full peacetime strength, and modified training was begun. Saturday, December 6, 1941, the 104th returned to Camp Edwards from the Carolina Maneuvers, the largest war games held up to that time. In less than 24 hours, the men who expected to return to their homes in a little over a month knew that they would be fighting another threat to the existence of their country."

"In January 1942, the 104th U.S. Infantry was put on Coastal Defense duty to forestall German attempts to secure bases in the North Atlantic and to prevent the landing of saboteurs. In March 1942 replacements joined the regiment to bring it to full war-time strength and the 104th was sent to patrol and coast from North Carolina and Key West, Florida. In January 1943, the regiment was assembled at Camp Blanding, Florida, to receive amphibious assault training. Here began the long hard grind of training which was to cover five army posts and a maneuver area. From Camp Blanding to Camp Gordon, Georgia, to Camp Campbell, Kentucky, to the Tennessee Maneuvers, back to Camp Campbell, to Fort Jackson, South Carolina, and finally to Camp Shanks, New York, for the final drills before going overseas. During this time, the 104th Infantry had furnished cadres of trained personnel to form the nucleus of new units being formed. Then it was back to the grind of training replacements. To the men who remained with the 104th throughout, all this training and retraining became very monotonous and tedious. On August 27, 1944, the 104th sailed for a destination which proved to be Cherbourg, France."

The 104th arrived in France on 7 September 1944, and served as part of the 26th Infantry Division for the remainder of the war. It saw action in France, Germany and, near the end of the war, Austria and Czechoslovakia. The regiment returned to Boston, Massachusetts on 28 December 1945, and was deactivated the next day at Camp Myles Standish in Taunton, Massachusetts.

== Post war ==
The 104th reactivated in its role as a unit of the Massachusetts National Guard on 29 November 1946. In 1947 it became part of the reactivated 26th Infantry Division. It underwent several reorganizations after the war and was eventually reduced to a single Infantry battalion (1st Battalion, 104th Infantry) in 1992 as part of the 26th Infantry Brigade (the successor unit to the 26th Infantry Division). The Regiment was deployed as part of SFOR in the early 2000s, after the Bosnian war. In 2005 it was consolidated with the 1st Battalion, 181st Infantry Regiment.

== Lineage ==
Mustered into Federal service 10 May 1898 as the 2nd Massachusetts Volunteer Infantry for service in Cuba; mustered out of Federal service 3 November 1898.

(Massachusetts Volunteer Militia redesignated 15 November 1907 as the Massachusetts National Guard).

Mustered into Federal service 18 June 1916 for service at the Mexico Border; mustered out of Federal service 31 October 1916.

Mustered into Federal service 25 March 1917 at Westfield, Massachusetts.; drafted into Federal service 5 August 1917.

Redesignated 22 August 1917 as 104th Infantry, an element of the 26th Division for service in the war. (Reinforced by elements of 6th and 8th Massachusetts Infantry.)

Demobilized 25 April 1919 at Camp Devens, Massachusetts.

Reorganized 31 March 1920 in the Massachusetts National Guard at Springfield, Massachusetts, as the 104th Infantry.

Redesignated 30 September 1921 as the 104th Infantry Regiment, an element the 26th Division (later redesignated as the 26th Infantry Division).

Inducted into federal service 16 January 1941 at Springfield, Massachusetts. Inactivated 29 December 1945 at Camp Myles Standish, Massachusetts.

Reorganized and federally recognized 29 November 1946 at Springfield, Massachusetts.

Redesignated 1 May 1959 under the Combat Arms Regimental System as the 1st Battle Group, 104th Infantry

Reorganized 1 March 1963, to consist of two battalions assigned to the 3rd Brigade of the 26th Division.

Reorganized 30 September 1992, 1st and 2nd Battalions are consolidated to form 1st Battalion, 104th Infantry.

Reorganized 1 October 1995 to consist of the 1st Battalion (Light Infantry), element of the 26th Infantry Brigade, 29th Infantry Division.

1st Battalion 104th Infantry Regiment was inactivated on 1 December 2005, and the remaining units were reconstituted and consolidated into the 1st Battalion, 181st Infantry Regiment.

== Battle honors ==
=== Revolutionary War ===
- Boston
- Long Island
- Trenton
- Princeton
- Saratoga
- Monmouth
- Quebec
- Rhode Island
- New York 1780

=== Civil War ===
- The Peninsula
- Antietam
- Fredericksburg
- Chancellorsville
- Gettysburg
- Virginia 1863
- Wilderness
- Spotsylvania
- Cold Harbor
- Petersburg

=== Spanish–American War ===
- Santiago

=== First World War ===
- Ile de France
- Lorraine
- Aisne-Marne
- Saint Mihiel
- Meuse-Argonne
- Champagne-Marne

=== Second World War ===
- Northern France
- The Rhineland
- The Ardennes
- Central Europe

== Notable soldiers ==
- John B. DeValles
- Edgar C. Erickson
- Walter Swol KIA 11/14/44

== Bibliography ==
- Albertine, Connell. The Yankee Doughboy. Boston: Brandon, 1968. Print. (Retired general's reminiscences of his experiences as a young officer with the 104th Infantry Regiment in France during World War I.)
- American Battle Monuments Commission. 26th Division Summary of Operations in the World War. Washington D.C.: American Battle Monuments Commission, 1944. Print. (Pamphlet with large, fold-out, annotated maps that detail the combat operations of the YD in World War I.)
- Benwell, Harry A. History of the Yankee Division. Boston: Cornhill, 1919. Print. (A comprehensive narrative history of the YD in World War I published immediately after the war.)
- Cole, Hugh M. The Lorraine Campaign. Vol. The European Theater of Operations. Washington: Center of Military History, 1950. Print. United States Army in World War II. (one volume from the official U.S. Army History of World War II. Outlines the combat operations in the Lorraine in World War II. This was the initial sustained action by the YD in the war.)
- Cole, Hugh M. The Ardennes: Battle of the Bulge. Vol. The European Theater of Operations. Washington: Center of Military History, 1965. Print. United States Army in World War II. (one volume from the official U.S. Army History of World War II. Outlines the combat operations in the Ardennes and the Battle of the Bulge in World War II. In this action the YD played a pivotal role in the defeat of the German offensive.)
- Connole, Dennis A. The 26th Yankee Division on Coast Patrol Duty 1942–1943. (This book is a chronicle of the training and the stateside patrol duties of the YD prior to deployment to Europe from January 1941 to 1944. It is a good source for the story of the pre-Pearl Harbor training and maneuvers. It focuses on the 181st Infantry Regiment.)
- Courtney Richard, Normandy to the Bulge: An American Infantry GI in Europe during World War II, Chicago: Southern Illinois Press, 2000. (A memoir which offers a spirited view of the war in Europe from the point of view of a PFC.)
- Fifield, James H. A History of the 104th U.S. Infantry AEF 1917–1919. 1946. Print. (Springfield newspaper man wrote this comprehensive history of the 104th Infantry Regiment from the organization in Westfield from the existing Mass. National Guard, through World War I and re-deployment.)
- George, Albert E., and Edwin H. Cooper. Pictorial History of the Twenty-Sixth Division United States Army. Boston: Ball, 1920. Print. (A volume of Signal Corps photographs and a narrative history of the YD in World War I. Includes unit pictures down to the company level and a fold-out panoramic of the entire YD on review at Camp Devens in 1919.)
- Gissen, Max, ed. History of a Combat Regiment 1639–1945. Salzburg, Austria, 1945. Print. (This is a theater-produced history of the 104th Infantry Regiment in World War II. It was created in Austria during occupation duty in 1945 and copies were distributed to all members of the regiment.)
- Historical & Pictorial Review National Guard of the Commonwealth of Massachusetts 1939. Baton Rouge: Army and Navy, 1939. Print. (This large yearbook, was a depression era project of the WPA. It includes a comprehensive historical sketch of the Mass. National Guard, and pictures and individual company histories for each unit.)
- Palladino, Ralph A., ed. History of a Combat Regiment 1639–1945. Baton Rouge: Army and Navy, 1960. Print. (This was a re-editing of the theater produced pamphlet of the same name. It was produced for distribution to 104th Infantry Veterans. It uses the same narrative and maps as the 1945 product, but augments them with collected personal photos and U.S. Signal Corps photos to create a yearbook-style history.)
- Passega, General. Le Calvaire De Verdun. Paris: Charled Levauzelle, 1927. Print. (This book is a history of the battles around Verdun in World War I written by the French Corps Commander that commanded the YD during the early campaigns of World War I. It includes descriptions of the actions of the YD in the Toul Sector and the actions of the 104th Infantry at Apremont.)
- Sibley, Frank P. With the Yankee Division in France. Norwood, MA: Little Brown and, 1919. Print. (A Boston newspaper man who served as an "embedded reporter" with the YD from the founding throughout World War I. It is a comprehensive and readable account of the war.)
- Taylor, Emerson G. New England in France 1917–1919. Boston: Houghton Mifflin, 1920. Print. (Another of the trio of volumes on the YD in the war published by newspaper men immediately following the war. Good narrative history.)
- Westbrook, Stillman F. Those Eighteen Months. Hartford: Case Lockwood and Brainard, 1934. Print. (This is a personal printing of war letters by the commander of the 104th Machine Gun Company in World War I. It is an interesting and witty look at the war as it was being experienced by CPT Westbrook.)
