= 2nd Massachusetts Volunteer Infantry Regiment (1898) =

- Active: 8 May–3 November 1898
- Country: United States
- Allegiance: Massachusetts
- Branch: United States Army
- Type: Infantry
- Size: 47 officers and 896 enlisted men (mustered in)
- Engagements: Battle of El Caney; Siege of Santiago

The 2nd Massachusetts Volunteer Infantry Regiment was an infantry unit of the United States Army, mustered into Federal service during the Spanish–American War.

It was one of three state volunteer regiments that fought in the Santiago Campaign in Cuba, and the only volunteer unit at the Battle of El Caney. The regiment participated in the Siege of Santiago until the city surrendered, spent several weeks in Cuba, and was moved back to the United States as a result of disease in August. After the end of a quarantine period the regiment was placed on leave and mustered out at the end of the period of leave in early November.

== History ==
=== Formation and transport to Florida ===
Armories of the regiment in 1898

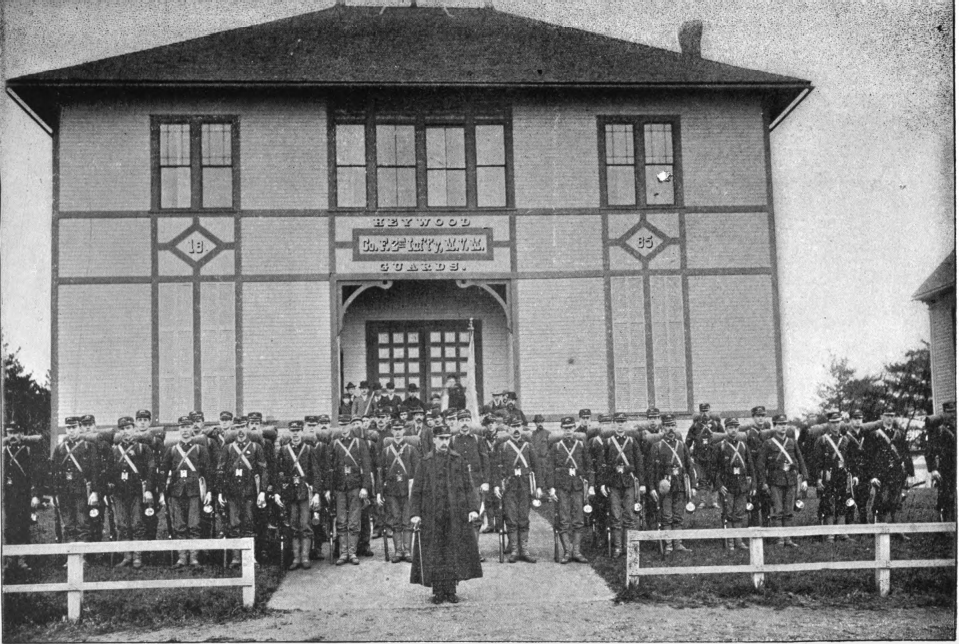
Company F of Gardner leaving its armory

As a result of President William McKinley's call for volunteers to fight in the Spanish–American War on 23 April 1898, Massachusetts was given a quota of four regiments. The colonel of the 2nd Infantry Regiment of the Massachusetts Volunteer Militia, Embury P. Clark, was given authority by the state to raise a regiment on 29 April, with preference being given to militia enlistments; it was brought up to strength by recruits not already in the militia. The core of the regiment was formed by the twelve companies of the 2nd Infantry, whose armories were located across Massachusetts – Companies A, C, and H were at Worcester, Companies B, G, and K at Springfield, Company D at Holyoke, Company E at Orange, Company F at Gardner, Company I at Northampton, Company L at Greenfield, and Company M at Adams. The regiment reported to the state camp ground at South Framingham, designated Camp Dewey, on 3 May, and mustered into Federal service as the 2nd Massachusetts Volunteer Infantry between 8 and 10 May, numbering 47 officers and 896 enlisted men.

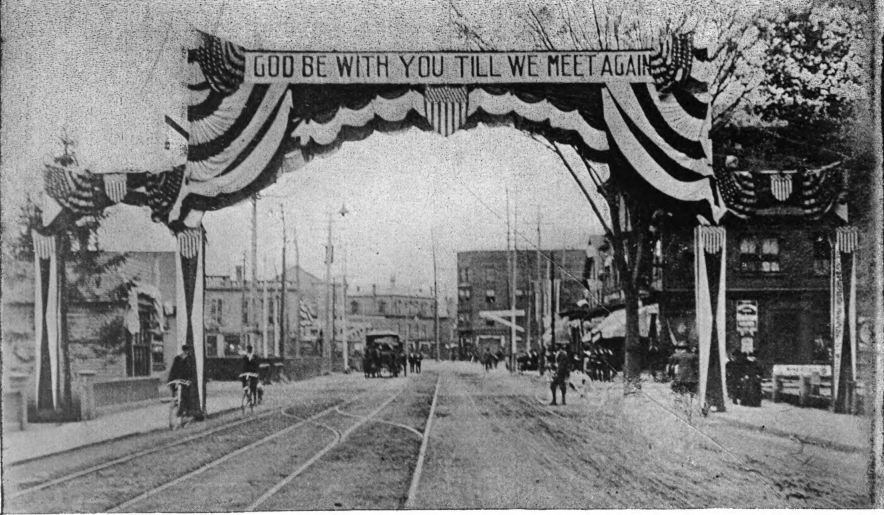
Farewell Arch in South Framingham

It was ordered to Tampa, Florida, on 13 May, moving by train to Newport, Rhode Island, where it transferred to the Fall River Line steamer Plymouth, arriving at New York on the morning of the next day. The regiment continued to Jersey City aboard the transports Vigilancia and Saratoga, completing the movement to Lakeland, Florida by rail on 18 May. At Lakeland it was temporarily assigned to the Second Cavalry Brigade of the Fifth Army Corps, along with the 1st and 10th Cavalry and the 71st New York Infantry. The regiment was again moved to Tampa on 30 May, transferring to the First Brigade of the Second Division of the Fifth Army Corps, alongside the Regular 8th and 22nd Infantry Regiments. The regiment camped at Ybor City, a suburb of the city, until 6–7 June, when it moved to the Port Tampa, bivouacking on the pier. The Headquarters and 1st Battalion embarked on board the transport SS Orizaba on 8 June, the 2nd Battalion on the SS Seneca, and the 3rd Battalion on the SS Concho. However, due to overcrowded conditions the Headquarters and the 1st and 3rd Battalions transferred to the SS Knickerbocker on 13 June. Companies E and M went aboard the SS Manteo, while Companies L & I remained aboard the Seneca.

=== Santiago Campaign ===
The transports sailed from Tampa on 14 June and arrived at Daiquirí, Cuba on 20 June, before the regiment began landing there on 22 June, with Company E being the first ashore. The landings were part of the Santiago Campaign, an attempt by the Fifth Army Corps to capture the city of Santiago de Cuba. Clark was temporarily placed in command of the brigade after its commander, Colonel James J. Van Horn, was seriously injured during the landing operation. When the rest of the brigade landed, excluding the 3rd Battalion of the 2nd Massachusetts, which landed on the next day and joined the regiment around noon, it advanced four miles into the interior, after which it bivouacked for the night. Early on the morning of 23 June, the brigade resumed the advance, arriving at Siboney, a village on the road to Santiago, just before noon. On 24 June Clark brought the 8th and 22nd Infantry to reinforce dismounted United States cavalry engaged in the Battle of Las Guasimas, but arrived as the engagement was ending; the 2nd Massachusetts was left behind to guard Siboney. In the late afternoon the advance was resumed, halting on the Las Guasimas battlefield at dark. Company G, which had remained at Siboney in order to unload supplies from the ships, reached the bivouac early the next morning, allowing the advance to be resumed.

The regiment fought in the Battle of El Caney on 1 July. The regiment, along with the 9th Massachusetts and the 71st New York, was among three state volunteer regiments to fight in combat during the Santiago Campaign and the only one to fight at El Caney. During the engagement, the brigade, commanded by Brigadier General William Ludlow, was positioned southwest of the village of El Caney next to the main road. The regiment was armed with the black powder burning single-shot .45-caliber Springfield rifle, whose smoke revealed their positions to Spanish troops. Clark later wrote that no unit had ever gone into combat under worse conditions, as 55% of his men were untrained recruits. The 2nd Massachusetts was ordered to halt its advance and instead hold its positions by Ludlow due to the inferiority of its armament. The regiment lost one officer killed and three wounded, and four enlisted men killed in action, three died of wounds, and 33 wounded.

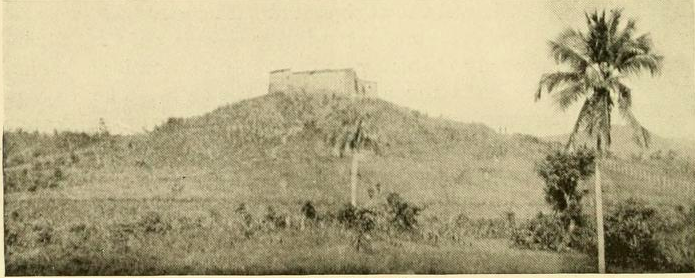
A Spanish blockhouse at El Caney

The regiment and the Second Division began marching towards San Juan Hill to reinforce the First Division in the Siege of Santiago before 6:00 pm, and bivouacked by the roadside at 9:00 pm. They resumed the march at 3:00 am, and the regiment reached the road at El Pozo mill under heavy fire from Spanish snipers, holding positions on a hill at the extreme right flank of the line. A Spanish attack was repulsed around 10:00 pm, although the regiment lost four enlisted men wounded, one mortally. The regiment received the news of the naval victory at the Battle of Santiago de Cuba on the afternoon 3 July, and advanced to the right, taking positions on a hill dominating the rear of the city in order to completely encircle it on 4 July. There, the regiment began digging breastworks, using knives, spoons, and mess plates and cups due to a shortage of entrenching tools.

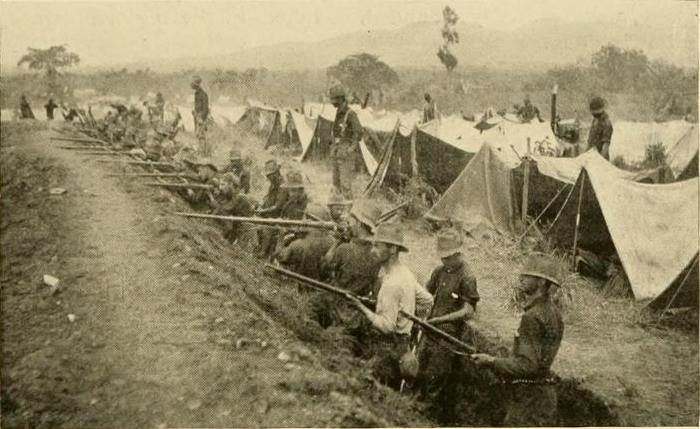
Entrenched camp of the regiment during the Siege of Santiago

The regiment remained in these positions until 10 July, when it relieved Cuban auxiliaries in trenches further to the right. That afternoon, United States artillery opened fire as a temporary truce expired. The regiment was moved to the right again on 11 July and finished the encirclement of the city on the next day, with the right of the brigade on the harbor on the north side of the city. At the last position, the regiment dug trenches until they were completed on the morning of 14 July, within a few hundred yards of the Spanish lines. It was ordered into the trenches and prepared for action at 11:20 am that day, but the city surrendered shortly afterwards. When the formal surrender took place three days later, the regiment paraded in front of its trenches.

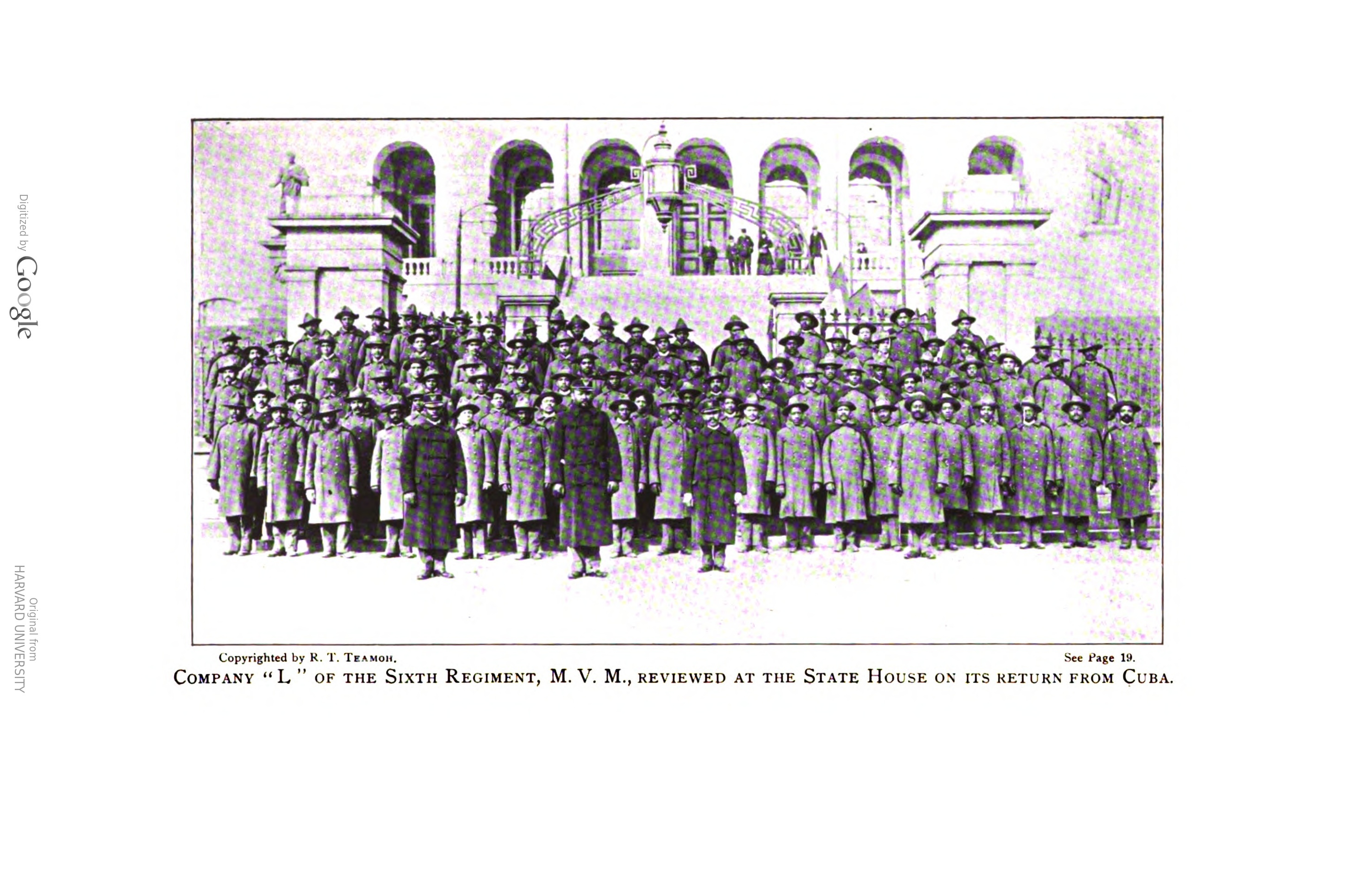

=== Occupation duty and return to the United States ===
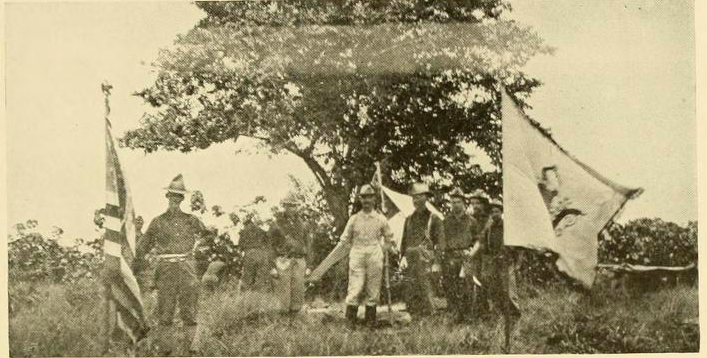
Regimental headquarters outside Santiago

The regiment remained in the positions for the next several weeks, a period in which disease struck the men, incapacitating as many as 65%. The regiment was subsequently transferred to the Third Brigade of the corps' Second Division, and left Santiago for the United States on 12 August aboard the transport Mobile with the entire brigade, arriving at Montauk Point on 19 August. The regiment was sent to Camp Wickoff, where it was furloughed for sixty days. At the conclusion of this period the 44 officers and 797 enlisted men of the regiment were mustered out of Federal service at Springfield on 3 November. While in service, the regiment lost one officer killed in action, three wounded, and two died of disease, while four enlisted men where killed in action, 41 wounded, four died of wounds, and 86 died of disease.

The 2nd Massachusetts was reestablished in the militia after it was mustered out, and its lineage was perpetuated by the 104th Infantry Regiment. As a result of the consolidation of the 104th Infantry with the 181st Infantry Regiment in 2006, the latter now perpetuates the lineage of the 2nd Massachusetts.
