= Sgt. Stubby: An American Hero =

- Theatrical release poster
- Directed by: Richard Lanni
- Written by: Richard Lanni; Mike Stokey
- Produced by: Emily Cantrill; Laurent Rodon
- Starring: Logan Lerman; Helena Bonham Carter; Gérard Depardieu
- Edited by: Mark Solomon
- Music by: Patrick Doyle
- Production companies: Fun Academy Media Group; Mikros Image
- Distributed by: Fun Academy Motion Pictures (United States, United Kingdom, and Ireland); Renaissance Media (Canada); Eurozoom (France)
- Release dates: March 27, 2018 (Los Angeles); April 13, 2018 (United States and Canada); August 10, 2018 (United Kingdom and Ireland); May 22, 2019 (France)
- Running time: 84 minutes
- Countries: United States; Ireland; Canada; France; United Kingdom
- Language: English
- Budget: $25 million
- Box office: $4.9 million

Sgt. Stubby: An American Hero is a 2018 animated adventure film centering on the real-life Sergeant Stubby, a stray Boston Terrier. Directed and co-written by Richard Lanni, it features the voices of Logan Lerman, Helena Bonham Carter and Gérard Depardieu. The film was released in North America on April 13, 2018, by Fun Academy Motion Pictures. It received generally positive reviews from critics, who praised it for its "sensitivity and charm", but was a box office bomb, grossing less than $5 million against its $25 million budget.

== Plot ==
With World War I looming, a Boston Terrier puppy with a stubby tail wanders into camp, as the men of the 102nd Infantry Regiment, 26th Infantry Division train on the parade grounds of Yale University. Robert Conroy, a doughboy, gives his new friend a name, Stubby.

Despite lacking formal military working dog training, Stubby and his human companions find themselves in the trenches of the Western Front in France and on the path to history. French poilu Gaston Baptiste befriends the duo and accompanies them along their journey.

As narrated by Robert's sister Margaret, Stubby's combat service includes sniffing incoming gas attacks, finding wounded allies in No Man's Land, and even catching a German infiltrator in the trenches. Back home, Stubby's exploits are retold in newspapers across the country.

For his actions, Stubby is still recognized as the most decorated dog in American history and the first canine promoted to the rank of Sergeant in the United States Army

== Cast ==
- Logan Lerman as Robert Conroy
- Helena Bonham Carter as Margaret Conroy
- Gérard Depardieu as Gaston Baptiste
- Jordan Beck as Elmer Olsen, Butcher Shop Owner
- Jim Pharr as Hans Schroeder
- Jason Ezzell as Sergeant Ray Casburn
- Nicholas Rulon as Captain George S. Patton
- Brian Cook as Clarence Ransom Edwards

== Production ==
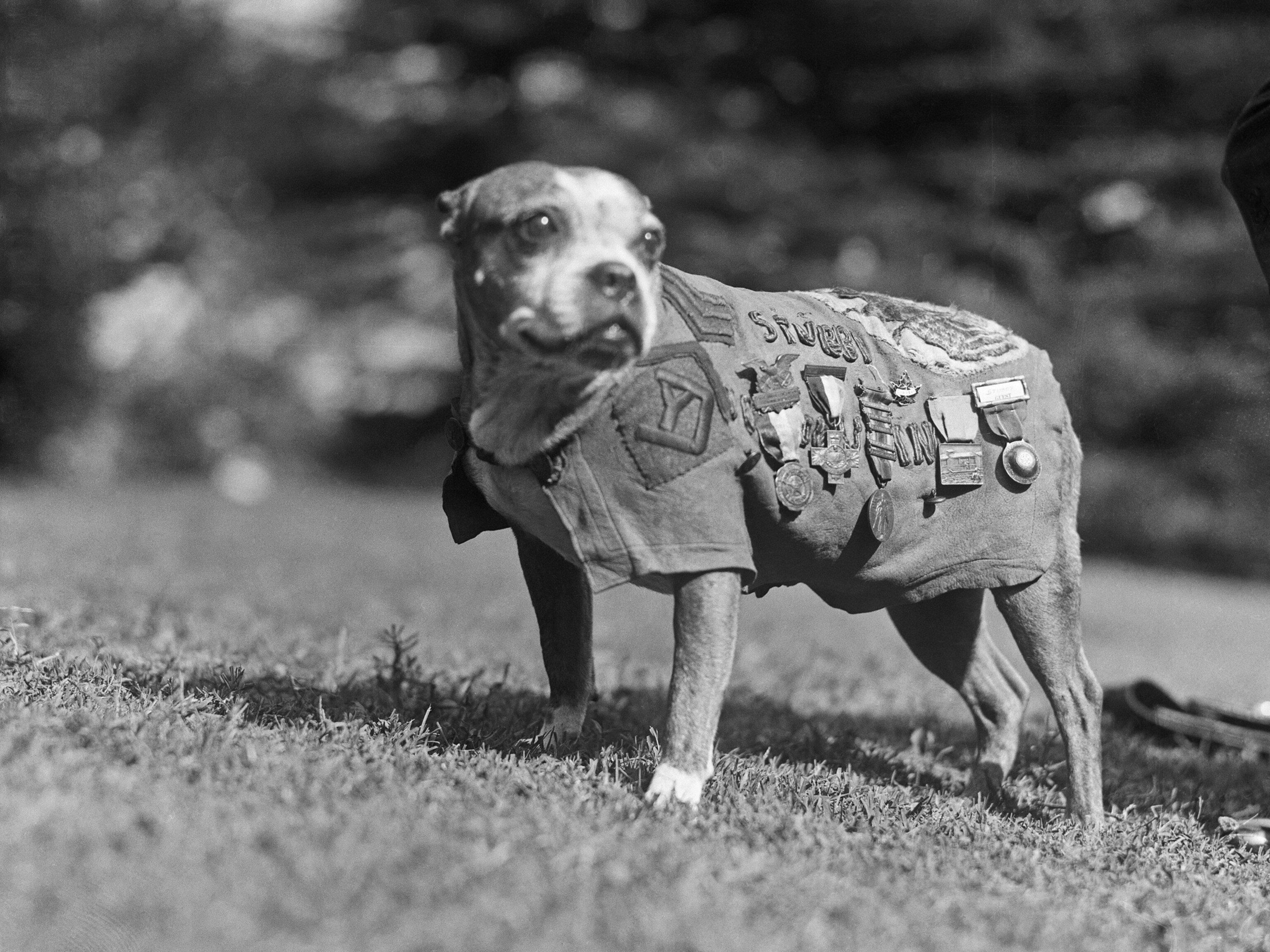
Sergeant Stubby, the real-life dog that inspired the film

On November 8, 2016, it was announced that Fun Academy Media Group, Ltd. – a new family entertainment production company headquartered in Kinsale, County Cork, Ireland – would produce an animated film based on the life of the World War I dog, Sergeant Stubby, and would self-distribute in North America through Columbus, Georgia-based subsidiary Fun Academy Motion Pictures. The film was animated by Mikros Image in Montreal and Paris, was directed by Richard Lanni, and written by Lanni with Mike Stokey II. The film involved Bibo Bergeron as head of story, and featured an original score composed by Patrick Doyle.

Sgt. Stubby himself does not speak, as the filmmakers wanted to maintain as much historical accuracy as possible while still making the film's portrayal of World War I accessible to children.

== Release ==
The film was released in the United States and North America on April 13, 2018, by Fun Academy Motion Pictures. The film was then released in the United Kingdom and Ireland on August 10, and in France on May 22, 2019. On June 15, 2017, Fun Academy Motion Pictures released a teaser trailer for the film on their YouTube channel. On December 1, 2017, the first theatrical teaser trailer was released in theaters across North America, and the full trailer was released on February 27, 2018.

Knowing the challenges a comparatively low-budget animated feature would have against studios who regularly spend hundreds of millions in marketing alone, Fun Academy's release strategy relied heavily on the real Stubby's existing fame by engaging cause-related groups, non-profits, military veterans, and educational organizations to establish a grassroots support base. The film was endorsed by the Humane Society of the United States, American Legion, Armed Services YMCA, and the United States World War One Centennial Commission. The filmmakers also adopted a dog, "Stubs" (originally "Barnaby"), from partner shelter Dallas Pets Alive to appear at events and serve as a "spokesdog" for shelter animals.

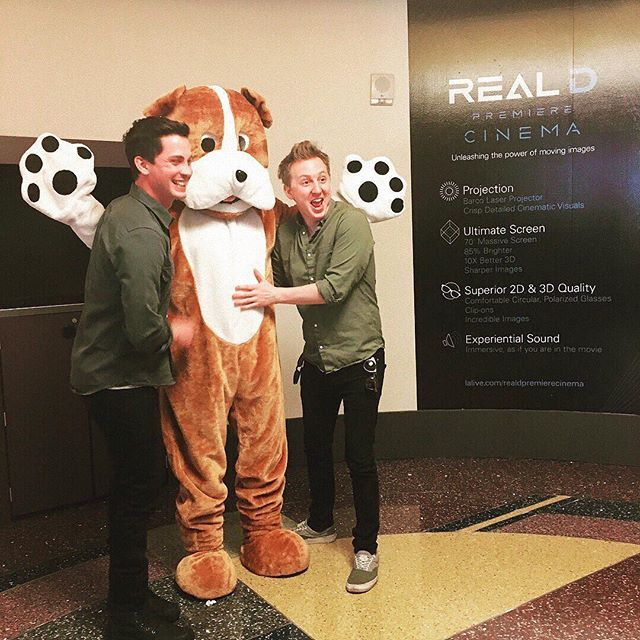
Logan Lerman and Dean Collins at the Sgt. Stubby World Premiere, 27 March 2018

Sgt. Stubby's world premiere occurred on March 27, 2018, at the Regal L.A. LIVE in downtown Los Angeles. The premiere was co-sponsored by Variety, the Children's Charity and benefiting the Boys & Girls Club of Boyle Heights, with 15 additional locations across the U.S. and Canada hosting free screenings for children in their communities on the following day.

On April 8, 2018, Sgt. Stubby hosted a second premiere in Sgt. Stubby's hometown of New Haven, Connecticut at the Bow Tie Cinemas, located only a few blocks away from the actual location Stubby was found in 1917. The event was hosted by the Connecticut State Library and National Guard Association of Connecticut, with hundreds of Connecticut National Guard soldiers and their families – including current members of Sgt. Stubby's 102nd Infantry Regiment – in attendance. A third and final premiere event was held on April 11, 2018, for Fun Academy Motion Pictures' U.S. headquarters at the National Infantry Museum and Soldier Center in Columbus, Georgia.

The film's wide opening on April 13, 2018, was originally slated behind Rampage (original release date: April 20) and Avengers: Infinity War (original release date: May 4). On March 1, 2018, Walt Disney Studios Motion Pictures announced a surprise release date change for Avengers, moving it up by one week to April 27. Rampage's distributor, Warner Bros., then announced that Rampage would also shift up by a week, landing their Dwayne Johnson-starring blockbuster on top of Sgt. Stubby's April 13 release date. That same weekend, independent filmmaker Wes Anderson's stop motion feature Isle of Dogs expanded into wide release in over 1,900 locations after having opened limited on March 23 and amassing solid critical buzz.

The combination of competing blockbusters' massive marketing budgets and another, better-known indie animation about dogs was more than first-time distributor Fun Academy could overcome; as a result, Sgt. Stubby: An American Hero opened in 1,633 theaters across the U.S. and Canada at No. 16 for the weekend and was pulled by most locations the following week to clear room for Avengers: Infinity War.

In a Reddit AMA in December 2018, one of the film's producers and voice actors, Jordan Beck, delivered this response to a question about the film being a box office bomb:

Imagine the pitch for a movie like Stubby, "We're going to make a kids movie about The Great War, but there's a dog that gets wounded, but he's okay in the end." This was always going to be a risky undertaking, and we knew we would have challenges, but it was an experiment to prove that there was an appetite for a different type of content.

In this modern era, Box Office is only one of the revenue streams; there's home media, Pay and non-pay TV, SVOD, airlines, foreign territories. Yes, our box office was not good, but that was not because we had a bad movie; it was because our release strategy was wrong and we didn't have the big bucks to compete with the major studios, especially after Disney moved "The Avengers: Infinity War" up by a week and caused Warner Bros. to move "Rampage" onto our release date.

All in all, for a first effort, we are happy where we are going as Stubby begins to expand around the world, Paramount has come on board for home media, and we have kept all our TV and SVOD rights.

=== Home media ===
The movie was released on DVD, Blu-Ray, Digital, and VOD in the United States and Canada by Paramount Home Media Distribution and Fun Academy Media Group on December 11, 2018. On February 11, 2019, Fun Academy released Sgt. Stubby: An Unlikely Hero on DVD and Blu-ray in the United Kingdom and Ireland, with Digital and VOD through Sky TV. The film also premiered on HBO in the U.S. on July 1, 2019.

== Reception ==
=== Box office ===
In the United States and Canada, Sgt. Stubby: An American Hero was released alongside the openings of Truth or Dare and Rampage, and the wide expansion of Isle of Dogs, and was projected to gross around $2 million from 1,633 theaters in its opening weekend. However, due to very little marketing done on the film, It made $350,000 on its first day and $1.3 million over its opening weekend, finishing 16th.

=== Critical response ===
On review aggregator website Rotten Tomatoes, the film holds an approval rating of 89%, based on 46 reviews, and an average rating of 6.8/10. The website's critical consensus reads, "Sgt. Stubby: An American Hero opens a vibrantly animated window into history with the surprisingly true – and poignant – tale of a distinguished canine combat veteran." On Metacritic, the film has a weighted average score of 58 out of 100, based on 14 critics, indicating "mixed or average reviews". Audiences polled by CinemaScore gave the film an average grade of "A" on an A+ to F scale.

=== Accolades ===
Sgt. Stubby has received numerous awards, endorsements, and festival laurels. The film was also awarded the Parents' Choice Gold Award and The Dove Foundation's All Ages Seal of Approval – despite not containing any explicitly faith-based messaging – as well as top honors from the National Parenting Center, the Hot Diggity Awards, and the Tillywig Toy & Media Awards.

Award	Date of ceremony	Location	Category	Recipient(s)	Result	Ref.
American Filmatic Arts Awards	December 7, 2018	Brooklyn Heights, NY	Best Animation Feature	Richard Lanni	Won	
Anaheim International Film Festival	December 8, 2019	Anaheim, CA	Gold Award – Best Animated Film	Fun Academy Motion Pictures	Won	
Animation Studio Festival	May 2, 2018	Los Angeles, CA	Best Feature	Fun Academy Motion Pictures	Won	
Antakya International Film Festival	December 29, 2018	Antakya, Turkey	Best Narrative Feature	Fun Academy Motion Pictures	Nominated	
Antakya International Film Festival	December 29, 2018	Antakya, Turkey	Best Director – Narrative Feature	Richard Lanni	Won	
Around International Film Festival (ARFF) Barcelona	April 1, 2018	Barcelona, Spain	Best Animation	Richard Lanni	Won	
Austin Under the Stars Film Festival	October 18, 2019	Austin, TX	Best Feature	Richard Lanni	Nominated	
Borderscene Film Festival	October 7, 2018	Las Cruces, NM	Best Animation	Fun Academy Motion Pictures	Won	
Borderscene Film Festival	October 7, 2018	Las Cruces, NM	Best U.S. Military	Fun Academy Motion Pictures	Won	
Catskill International Film Festival	September 9, 2018	Callicoon, NY	Official Selection	Richard Lanni	Nominated	
Family Film Festival	July 21, 2018	Provo, UT	Best Animation	Fun Academy Motion Pictures	Won	
Festival Audiovisual Infantil y Juvenil	December 29, 2018	Mérida, Venezuela	Official Selection	Fun Academy Motion Pictures	Nominated	
G.I. Film Festival	October 3, 2018	San Diego, CA	Best Film Made By or Starring Veterans or Military	Richard Lanni, Jordan Beck	Nominated	
Gold Movie Awards	January 10, 2019	London, UK	Best Animation	Richard Lanni	Won	
Hollywood Divine International Film Festival	October 13, 2018	Camp Hill, PA	Best Animated Feature	Fun Academy Motion Pictures	Won	
IndieFEST Film Awards	November 5, 2019	La Jolla, CA	Best in Show	Richard Lanni	Won	
International Film Festival Manhattan	October 17, 2018	New York City, NY	Best Feature (USA)	Richard Lanni	Nominated	
International Kids Film Festival	November 18, 2018	Bangalore, India	Official Selection – Feature Film	Richard Lanni	Nominated	
International Sound & Music Festival	October 22, 2018	Pula, Croatia	Best Original Score, Feature Film	Patrick Doyle	Nominated	
Interrobang Film Festival	June 24, 2018	Des Moines, IA	Official Selection	Fun Academy Motion Pictures	Nominated	
JellyFEST Film Festival	June 10, 2018	North Hollywood, CA	Best Animated Feature	Richard Lanni	Won	
JuniorFest: International Film Festival for Children and Youth	November 11, 2018	Dobřany, Czech Republic	Best Animated Feature Film for Children 5–12 Years	Richard Lanni	Nominated	
KIDS FIRST! Film Festival	April 30, 2018	Nationwide	Approved Film: Ages 6–12	Richard Lanni	Won	
Macon Film Festival	August 18, 2019	Macon, GA	Karen Black Audience Award – Narrative Feature	Richard Lanni	Won	
Mediterranean Film Festival Cannes	November 30, 2018	Cannes, France	Best Animation	Richard Lanni	Won	
Miami Independent Film Festival	September 28, 2019	Miami, FL	Best Feature Film	Richard Lanni	Won	
Mid Tenn Film Fest	June 16, 2018	Smyrna, TN	Best Animated Feature	Fun Academy Motion Pictures	Won	
Montana International Film Festival	September 15, 2018	Billings, MT	Official Selection (Animation Feature)	Richard Lanni	Nominated	
Montreal International Animation Festival	August 17, 2018	Montreal, QC	Official Selection	Fun Academy Motion Pictures	Nominated	
Moving Parts Film Festival	September 15, 2018	Los Angeles, CA	Official Selection	Fun Academy Motion Pictures	Nominated	
Napa Valley Film Festival	November 11, 2018	Yountville, CA	Special Presentation: Veterans Day Centennial Screening	Fun Academy Motion Pictures	Nominated	
National Film Awards	March 27, 2019	London, UK	Best Animation Film	Fun Academy Motion Pictures	Nominated	
National Film Awards	March 27, 2019	London, UK	Best Performance in an Animation Film	Helena Bonham Carter	Nominated	
North Beach American Film Festival	June 24, 2018	North Beach, MD	Official Selection	Fun Academy Motion Pictures	Nominated	
North Europe International Film Festival	February 23, 2019	London, UK	Best Film	Richard Lanni, Laurent Rodon, Jordan Beck	Nominated	
North Europe International Film Festival	February 23, 2019	London, UK	Best Animation or Animated Sequence	Richard Lanni, Laurent Rodon, Jordan Beck	Nominated	
North Europe International Film Festival	February 23, 2019	London, UK	Best Original Score	Patrick Doyle	Nominated	
North Europe International Film Festival	February 23, 2019	London, UK	Best Sound Design	Christian Rivest	Nominated	
Open World Toronto Film Festival	October 21, 2018	Toronto, ON	Best Animation	Richard Lanni	Won	
Palm Springs International Animation Festival & Expo	December 13, 2018	Palm Springs, CA	Best Animated Feature	Richard Lanni, Jordan Beck	Won	
Park City International Film Festival	June 16, 2018	Park City, UT	Official Selection	Fun Academy Motion Pictures	Nominated	
Paris Art & Movie Awards	June 25, 2018	Paris, France	Best Feature Film	Richard Lanni	Nominated	
Reel East Texas Film Festival	November 18, 2018	Kilgore, TX	Best Animated Feature	Fun Academy Motion Pictures	Won	
Regina International Film Festival and Awards	August 18, 2018	Regina, SK	Official Selection	Fun Academy Motion Pictures	Nominated	
Rendezvous Film Festival	September 20, 2018	Amelia Island, FL	Official Selection	Fun Academy Motion Pictures	Nominated	
Rhode Island International Film Festival	August 12, 2018	Providence, RI	Best Children's Animation	Richard Lanni	Won	
Rome International Film Festival (RIFF)	November 9, 2019	Rome, GA	Best Animated Feature	Richard Lanni	Won	
Royal Starr Film Festival	October 14, 2018	Birmingham, MI	Official Selection	Richard Lanni	Nominated	
Scruffy City Film & Music Festival	July 29, 2018	Knoxville, TN	Best Original Score	Patrick Doyle	Won	
Scruffy City Film & Music Festival	July 29, 2018	Knoxville, TN	Molly Davis Animal Advocacy Award	Richard Lanni, Jordan Beck	Won	
Silver State Film Festival	September 9, 2018	Las Vegas, NV	Grand Prize – Best Animated Feature	Fun Academy Motion Pictures	Won	
Spark Animation 2018	October 28, 2018	Vancouver, BC	Official Selection	Fun Academy Motion Pictures	Nominated	
Tri-Cities International Film Festival	October 22, 2018	Richland, WA	Best Feature Film – Animation/Sci-Fi & Fantasy	Richard Lanni	Won	
Trinity International Film Festival	August 12, 2018	Detroit, MI	Best Animated Film	Richard Lanni	Won	
Veterans Film Festival	November 3, 2018	Canberra, Australia	Best Animation	Fun Academy Motion Pictures	Won	
Western New York Film, Art & Music Event (F.A.M.E.)	August 12, 2018	Batavia, NY	Official Selection	Fun Academy Motion Pictures	Nominated	
Will Rogers Motion Picture Festival	November 2, 2019	Claremore, OK	Best Narrative Feature	Richard Lanni, Jordan Beck	Won	

== Sequels and spin-offs ==
Fun Academy has announced a slate of follow-up media including two planned feature film sequels following Stubby's return home, as well as a prequel television series.

=== The Stubby Squad ===
On November 21, 2019, Fun Academy announced a new membership service, The Stubby Squad, a hybrid over-the-top channel and crowdfunding platform offering original streaming programming, downloadable crafts, and forum/blogs to interact with the filmmakers behind the scenes as they develop their announced slate, which includes two additional Sgt. Stubby features and a prequel television series.

The Stubby Squad's available members-only content at launch included an original documentary series called In the Pawprints of History with writer/director Richard Lanni traveling to the real locations visited by Stubby and the 102nd Infantry Regiment across France, as well as a graphic novel cookbook Cooking with Gaston, featuring the character voiced in the film by Gérard Depardieu as he introduces kid-friendly French recipes and gardening tips.

=== Stubby & Friends ===
Stubby & Friends is a free web comic written by Scott Christian Sava (Animal Crackers, The Dreamland Chronicles, Spider-Man) and illustrated by Tracy Bailey (The Dreamland Chronicles, Kung Fu Panda). The first printed anthology was released in October 2020.

=== Stubby: The Series ===
An animated television series was announced as being in development, which would act as a prequel to the film and focus on Stubby's life as a street dog in New Haven, Connecticut circa 1915–1917. The filmmakers have stated Charlie Chaplin's The Kid as a source of inspiration to tell the story of kids and animals living on the outskirts of an industrial capital of the early 20th century through a series of comedic misadventures. The series development team was announced as being led by Scott Christian Sava and David Wise (Teenage Mutant Ninja Turtles, Batman: The Animated Series). However, Wise died in early 2020, less than four months after the project was announced, and there have been no further updates on the status of the project in the years since.

=== Film Sequels ===
After the war, the real Sgt. Stubby was featured in parades and events, including the first American Legion convention in 1919. He also met three sitting presidents – Woodrow Wilson, Warren G. Harding, and Calvin Coolidge – and visited the White House twice. In 1919, Stubby was offered a contract by New Haven-based vaudeville impresario Sylvester Z. Poli for a series of engagements. In 1921, General John J. Pershing awarded Stubby a medal from the Humane Education Society at a White House ceremony that received national print coverage. That same year, he became the mascot for the Georgetown Hoyas and is credited as inventing the halftime show as he performed tricks during football games, while Conroy juggled his studies at Georgetown Law with his job as a special agent of the Bureau of Investigation (precursor to the FBI).

Fun Academy has announced Sgt. Stubby: An American Hero as the first chapter of a planned cinematic trilogy, with the second film dealing with vaudeville, the entertainment industry and the challenges faced by soldiers returning from WWI, while the third film would feature Conroy and Stubby fighting crime during Prohibition.
