= Battle of Seicheprey =

1918 battle on the Western Front of World War I

- Part of the Western Front of World War I
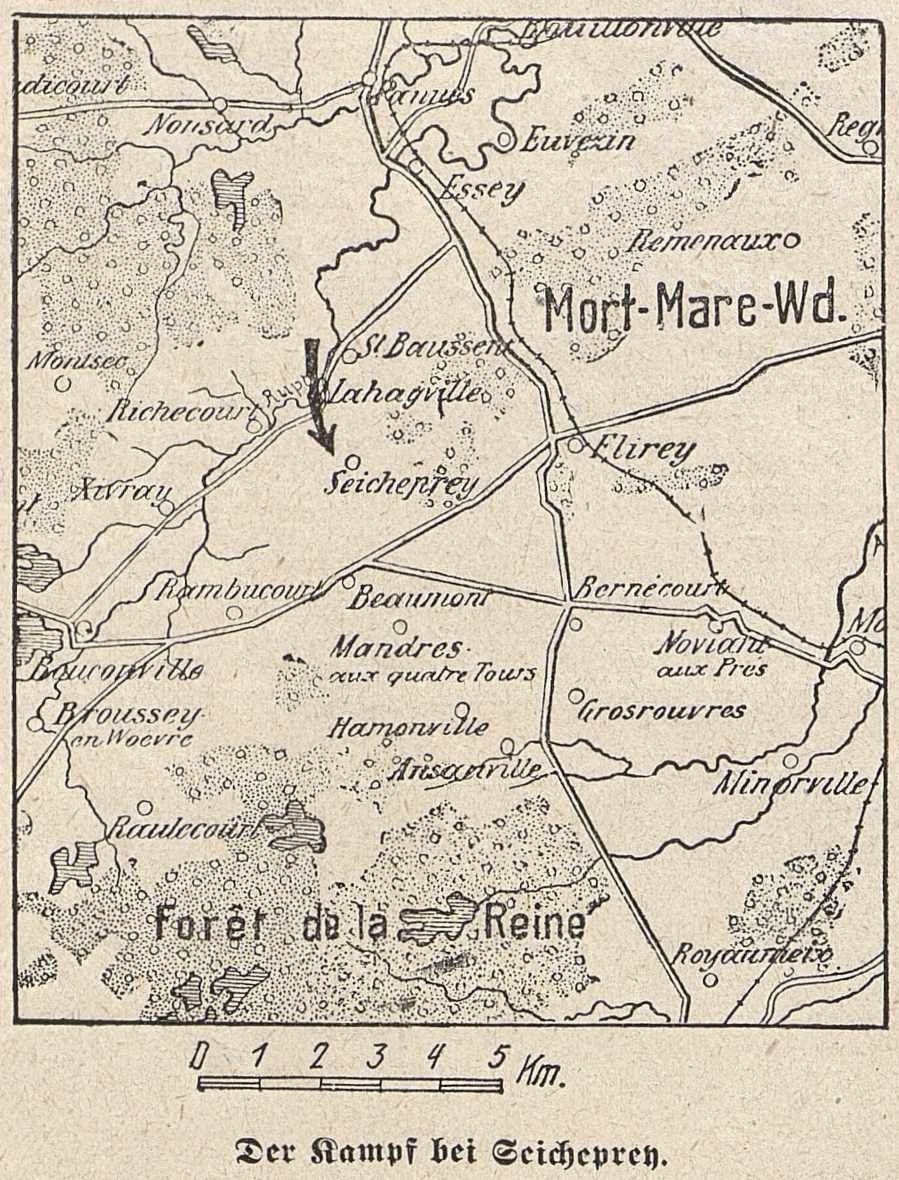
- German map of the German attack on Seicheprey on 20 August 1918
Date	20–21 April 1918
Location	Seicheprey, Meurthe-et-Moselle, France
Result	Indecisive; Germans accomplished their tactical goal, Americans later retook the ground

Belligerents
German Empire	United States of America

Commanders and leaders
(German Empire) ?	(United States) Clarence Ransom Edwards; (United States) John Henry Parker

Units involved
(German Empire) Stormtrooper Battalion Tolle; (German Empire) Stormtrooper Battalion Hellmuth; (German Empire) Stormtrooper Battalion Seeböhm	(United States) 26th Infantry Division; (United States) 102nd Infantry Regiment

Casualties and losses
about 150 killed about 450 wounded and captured	81 killed 424 wounded 130 captured

The Battle of Seicheprey was a military engagement fought from 20 to 21 April 1918 as a part of the German spring offensive in north-eastern France during the First World War. Three German battalions of Sturmtruppen units commenced an attack on Allied positions in the village of Seicheprey, defended by American troops of the 26th Infantry Division, and after fierce fighting captured the village. Later that day Americans started a counterattack and the Germans withdrew. The clash is commemorated as the first significant war action of American expeditionary troops in Europe.

== Prelude ==
After the United States entered the war in April 1917, US Army started to prepare the expeditionary forces to support military efforts of the Allies on the Western front. Few thousands of those troops, including American 26th Infantry Division (also known as "Yankee Division") formed in July 1917, arrived to France in fall 1917. 26th Infantry Division took an additional military training at the Neufchateau, Vosges during the fall and winter of 1917

They were then deployed in March 1918 to the Chemin des Dames area where the men had their first experience with defensive and offensive operations and also with poison gas. In April 1918 they were deployed in the Toul ahd Saint-Mihiel Sector, among the other American forces. Location around the village of Seicheprey was defended by the 102nd Infantry Regiment, composed mostly from the men from Connecticut and New England.

During the ongoing German spring offensive an attack in Seicheprey area was planned. German command, informed about the presence of American units in the area, demanded to get more information about their streight, equipment or positions, so the three Sturmtruppen battalions, specially trained for surprise attacks and taking prisoners, named Tolle, Hellmuth and Seeböhm were deployed to complete this task.

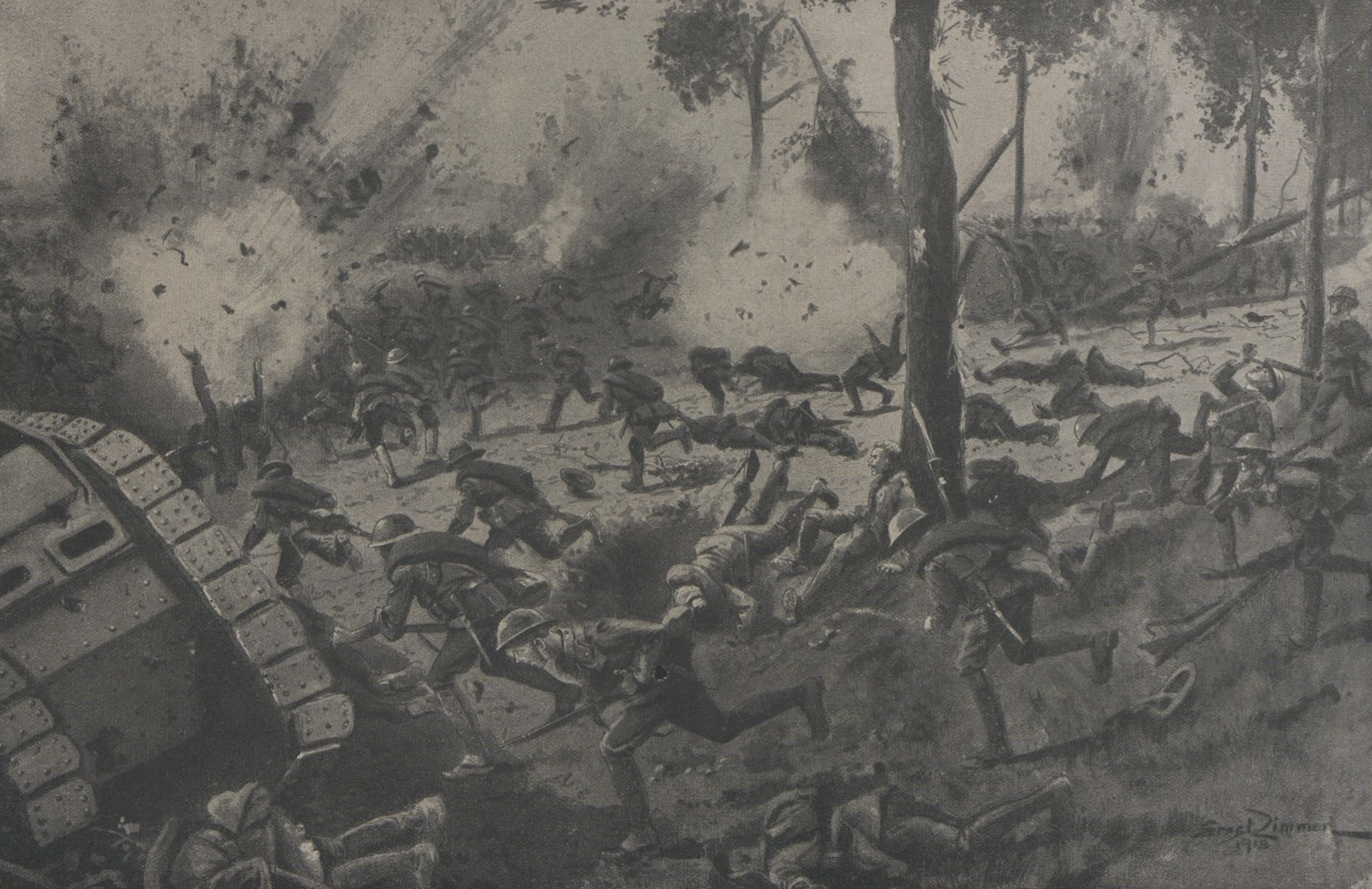
American troops retreating after the storming of Seicheprey on April 20, 1918 (German illustration)

== Battle ==
On 20 April at 4 a.m., German field artillery commenced a bombardment of the 102nd Infantry's positions near Seicheprey before German Sturmtruppen units of about 3,000 men moved against the village. The artillery box barrage, continuing 36 hours, isolated American units. The Germans, attacking from the north-western, north and north-eastern direction, overwhelmed a machine gun company and two infantry companies of the 102nd and temporarily breached the trenches and forced Americans to leave their posts in the early morning. Between 400 and 500 American soldiers were wounded or killed.

26th Division then regrouped and started a counterattack, led by 102nd Regiment, during the night from 20 to 21 April. The Germans withdrew before the division could counterattack, as the main goal of the attack wasn't to gain land.

American loses included 81 killed, 424 wounded, and 130 captured, including about 6 officers. Germans lost over 600 men, including 150 killed of their own. On the American side Sergeant Stubby, dog serving as a mascot of the unit, was also wounded. Most of the fallen Americans were buried at the St. Mihiel American Cemetery, German fallen were buried at Bouillonville German Military Cemetery.

== Aftermath ==
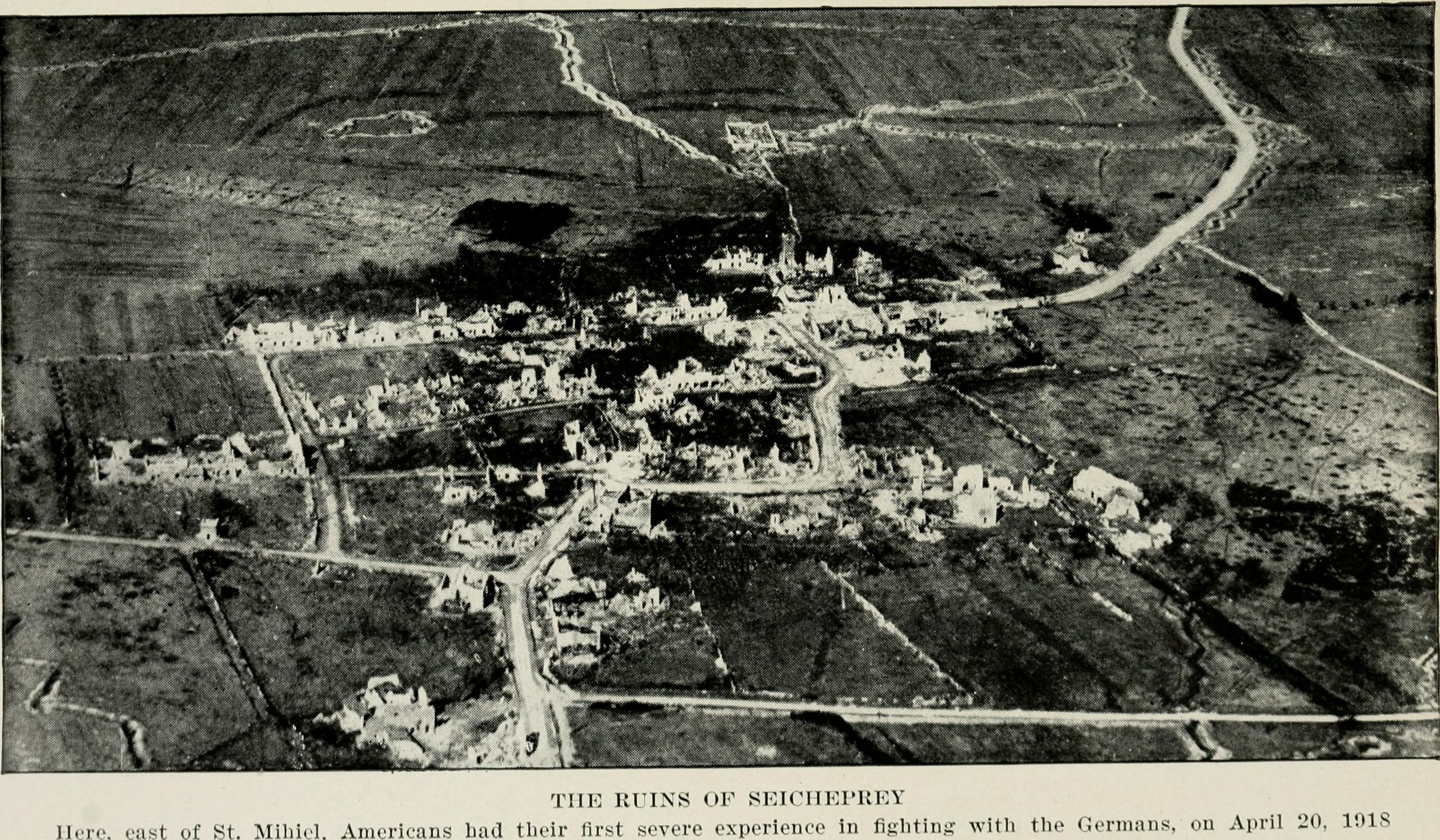
The Ruins of Seicheprey after the battle

Having a minor strategical importance, the engagement caught the attention of both German and American media, claiming victory on both sides. Colonel John Henry Parker, one of the commanders of the 102nd Infantry Regiment, received for his actions by Seicheprey Distinguished Service Cross with three bronze oak leaves.

Similar raids later struck the American 101st Infantry at Flirey on 27 May, and the 103rd Infantry at Xivray-et-Marvoisin on 16 June, but were repulsed.

== Memory ==
A stained glass depiction of the action of 20 April 1918 was made in the Hamden Memorial Town Hall in Hamden, Connecticut.

== See also ==
- German spring offensive
- 26th Infantry Division (United States)

== Bibliography ==
- Augustin, F. (2022). When Connecticut Stopped the Hun; Battle of Seicheprey, April 20-21, 1918. Creative Media Partners, LLC. ISBN 9781015876637.
- Strickland, Daniel W., Captain (1930). Connecticut fights; the story of the 102nd regiment. New Haven: Quinnipiack Press.
