= Sergeant Stubby =

American war dog

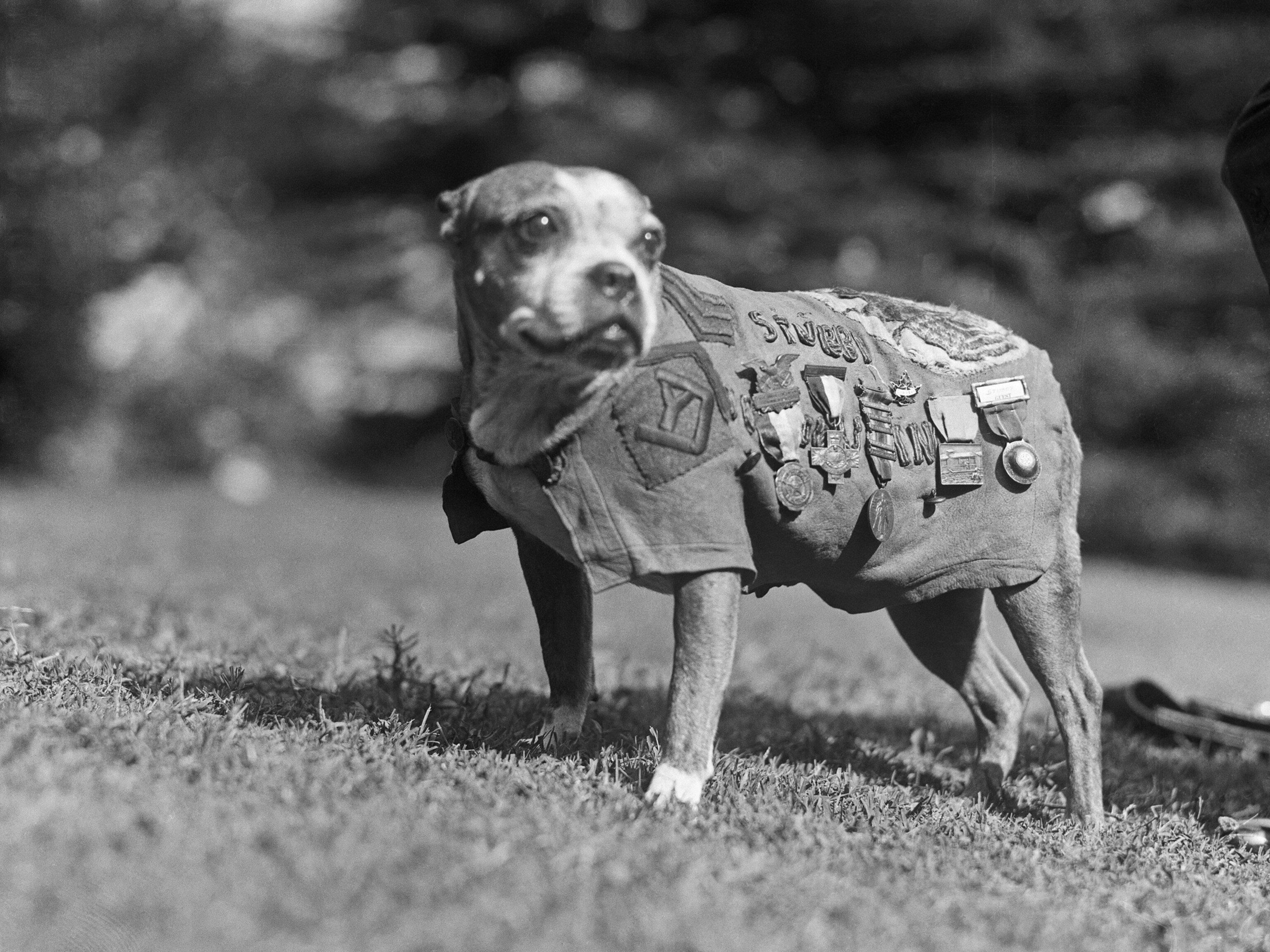
- Sergeant Stubby c. 1920
- Born: 1915 or earlier
- Died: March 16, 1926 (aged 10–11)
- Burial place: Smithsonian, Washington, D.C., U.S.
- Military career
- Allegiance: United States of America
- Branch: United States Army
- Service years: 1917–18
- Rank: Sergeant
- Units: 102nd Infantry Regiment, 26th (Yankee) Division
- Conflicts: World War I: 17 battles on the Western Front (WIA)
- Awards: Gold Medal (Humane Education Society); Wound stripe Purple Heart (2)
- Other work: Mascot for Georgetown Hoyas

Sergeant Stubby (1915 – March 16, 1926) was a dog who was the unofficial mascot of the 102nd Infantry Regiment and was assigned to the 26th (Yankee) Division in World War I and travelled with his division to France to fight alongside the French. He served for 18 months and participated in 17 battles and four offensives on the Western Front. He saved his regiment from surprise mustard gas attacks, found and comforted the wounded, and allegedly once attacked and held a German soldier by the seat of his pants, keeping him there until American soldiers found him. His actions were well-documented in contemporary American newspapers. He received many awards, including a gold medal, a wound stripe, and two purple hearts.

Stubby has been called the most decorated war dog of the Great War and the only dog to be nominated and promoted to sergeant through combat. Stubby's preserved body is on display in the National Museum of American History. Stubby is the subject of the 2018 animated film Sgt. Stubby: An American Hero.

== Early life ==
Stubby was described in contemporaneous news items as a Boston Terrier or "bull terrier" mutt. Describing him as a dog of "uncertain breed," Ann Bausum wrote that: "The brindle-patterned pup probably owed at least some of his parentage to the evolving family of Boston Terriers, a breed so new that even its name was in flux: Boston Round Heads, American... and Boston Bull Terriers." Stubby was found wandering the grounds of the Yale University campus in New Haven, Connecticut, in July 1917, while members of the 102nd Infantry were training. He hung around as the men drilled, and one soldier in particular, Corporal James Robert Conroy (1892–1987), developed a fondness for him. When it came time for the outfit to ship out, Conroy hid Stubby on board the troop ship. As they were getting off the ship in France, he hid Stubby under his overcoat without detection. Upon discovery by Conroy's commanding officer, Stubby saluted him as he had been trained to do in camp, and the commanding officer allowed the dog to stay on board.

== Military service ==
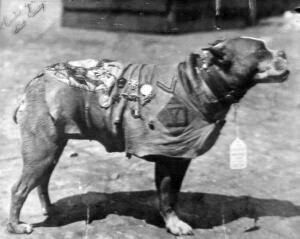
Sergeant Stubby wearing his coat, dog tag and medals.

Stubby served with the 102nd Infantry Regiment in the trenches in France for 18 months and participated in four offensives and 17 battles. He entered combat on February 5, 1918, at Chemin des Dames, north of Soissons, and was under constant fire, day and night for over a month. In April 1918, during a raid to take Seicheprey, Stubby was wounded in the foreleg by retreating Germans throwing hand grenades. He was sent to the rear for convalescence and, as he had done on the front, improved morale. When he recovered from his wounds, Stubby returned to the trenches.

In his first year of battle, Stubby was injured by mustard gas. After he recovered, he returned with a specially designed gas mask to protect him. He thus learned to warn his unit of mustard gas attacks, locate wounded soldiers in no man's land, and—since he could hear the whine of incoming artillery shells before humans—became very adept at alerting his unit when to duck for cover. He was solely responsible for capturing a German spy in the Argonne, leading to their unit's commander nominating Stubby for the rank of sergeant. Following the retaking of Château-Thierry by the U.S., women of the town made Stubby a chamois coat upon which his many medals were pinned. He was later injured again, in the chest and leg by a grenade. He ultimately had two wound stripes. At the end of the war, Robert Conroy and Stubby returned home in 1918.

== After the war ==
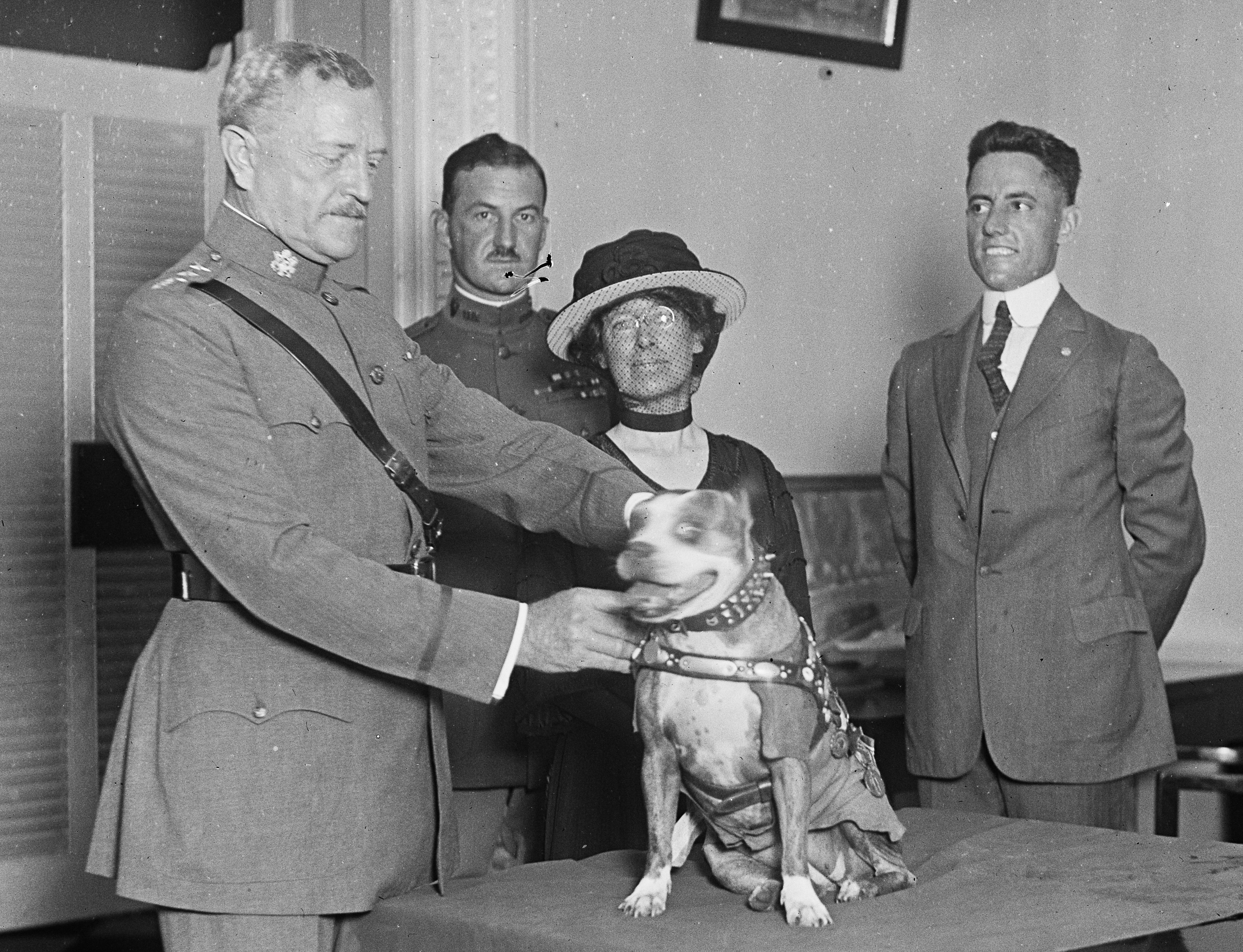
Gen. John Pershing awards Sergeant Stubby with a medal from the Humane Education Society at a White House ceremony, 1921

After returning home, Stubby became a celebrity and marched in, and normally led, many parades across the country. He met Presidents Woodrow Wilson, Calvin Coolidge, and Warren G. Harding. He also appeared on vaudeville stages owned by Sylvester Z. Poli and was awarded lifetime memberships to the American Legion and the YMCA.

In 1921, General of the Armies John J. Pershing presented a gold medal from the Humane Education Society to Stubby, the subject of a famous photograph and other artistic media. During that same year, he attended Georgetown University Law Center along with Conroy, and became the Georgetown Hoyas' team mascot. Given a football at halftime, he would nudge it around the field, to the amusement of the fans. While still a student at Georgetown, Conroy was also employed as a special agent of the Bureau of Investigation, precursor to the FBI.

Stubby died in his sleep in March 1926. After his death he was preserved via taxidermy and his cremains were sealed inside of the mount. Conroy later presented Stubby to the Smithsonian in 1956. The taxidermy mount of the dog is part of the permanent collection at the Smithsonian National Museum of American History and is currently on display in their “Price of Freedom: Americans at War” exhibit.

== Legacy ==
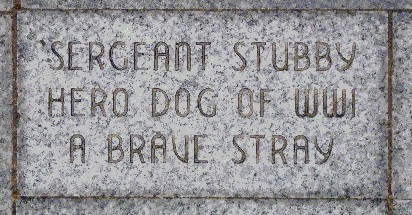
Sergeant Stubby's brick at Liberty Memorial

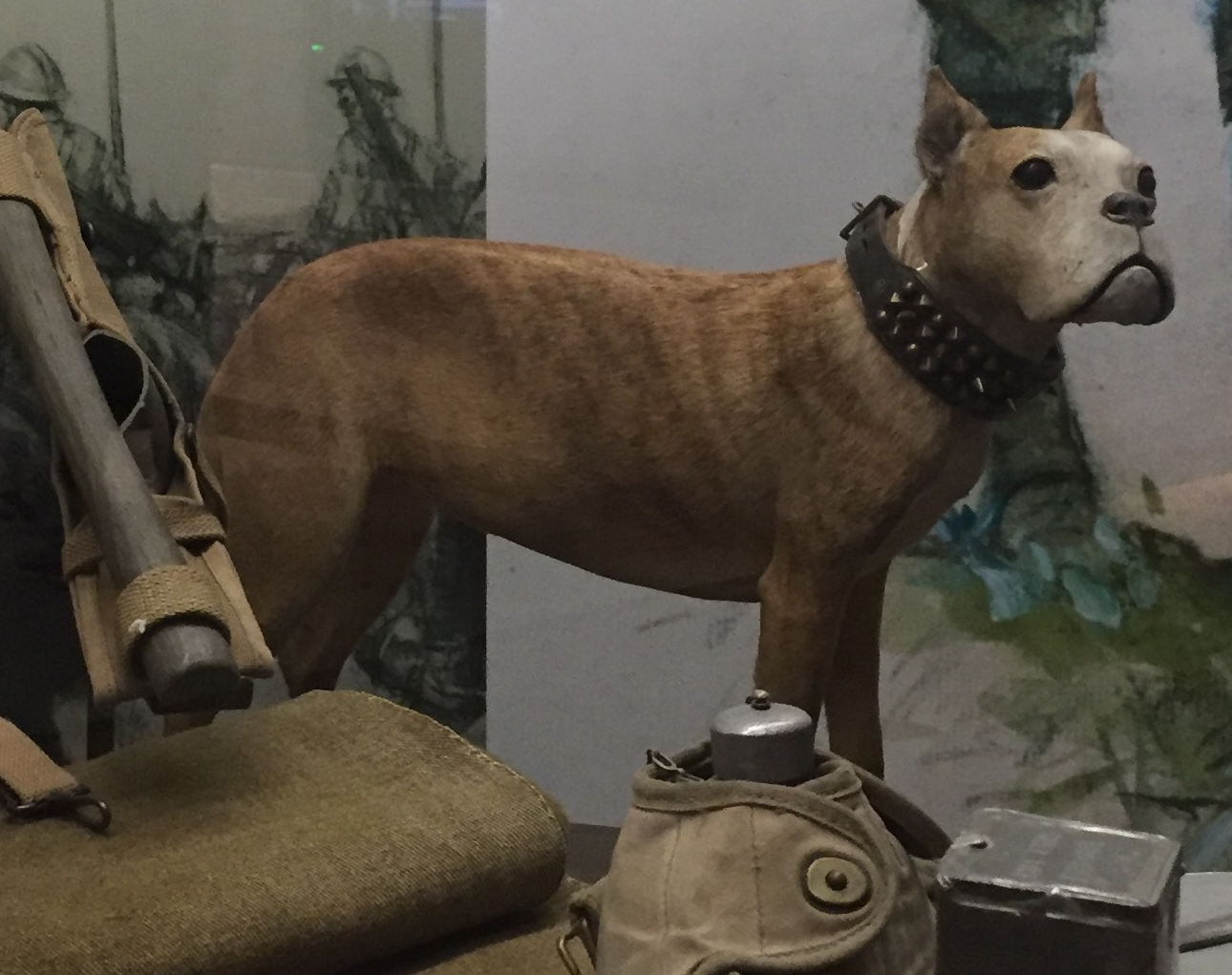
Sergeant Stubby preserved at the National Museum of American History

Stubby received an obituary in the New York Times following his death in 1926. The obituary was half a page, much longer than the obituaries of many notable people of that time period.

He was also the subject of a portrait by "Capitol artist" Charles Ayer Whipple. He was featured in the Brave Beasts exhibit at the Legermuseum in Delft, The Netherlands from 2008 to 2009. During a ceremony held on Armistice Day in 2006, a brick was placed in the Walk of Honor at the Liberty Memorial in Kansas City to commemorate Sergeant Stubby.

Stubby was the subject of at least four books. In 2014, BBC Schools WWI series used Stubby as a Famous Figure to help teach children about the war, along with creating an animated comic strip to illustrate his life.

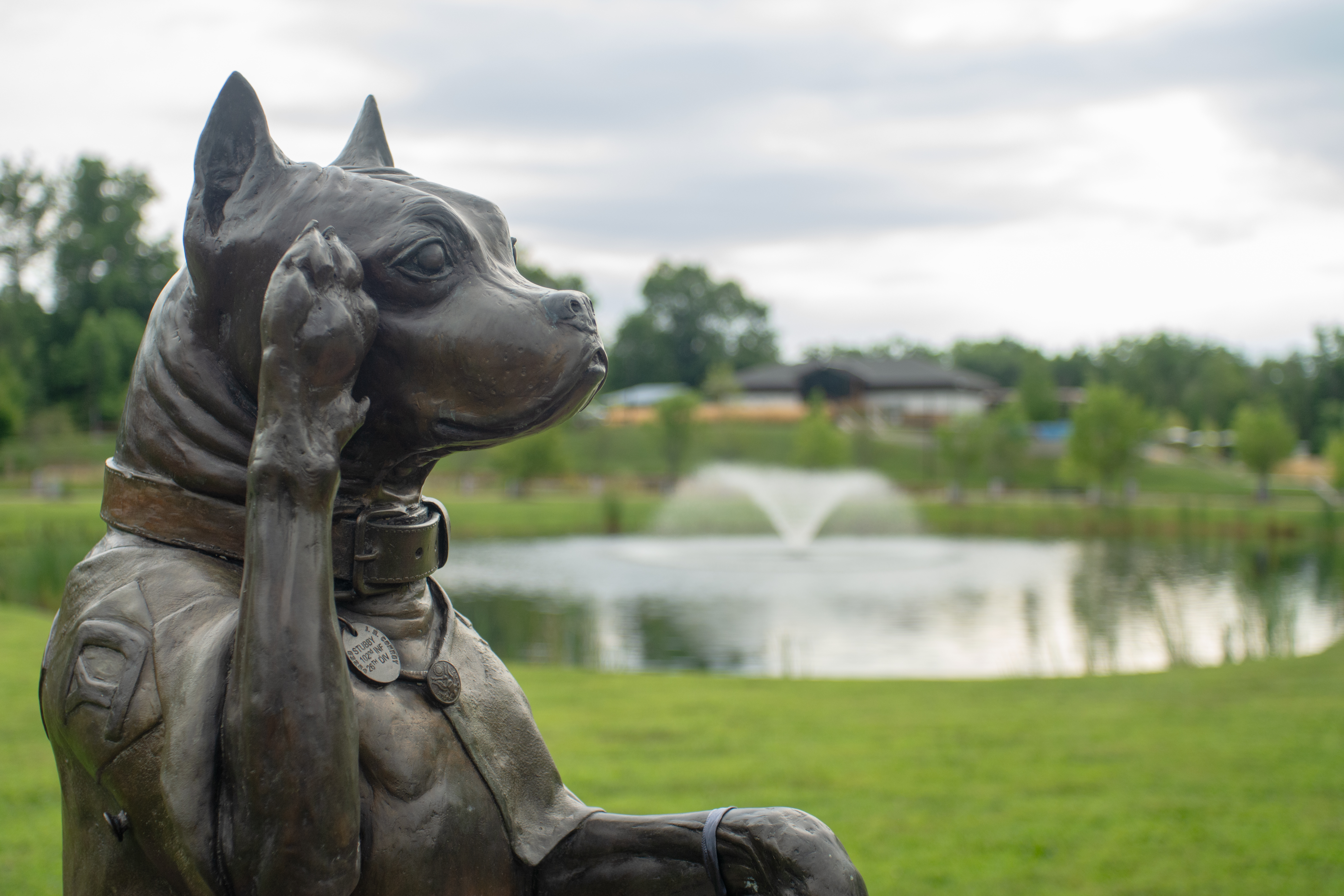
Sergeant Stubby monument at Veterans Memorial Park in Middletown, Connecticut

Stubby has his portrait on display at the West Haven Military Museum in Connecticut. In addition, the descendants of Robert Conroy dedicated a life-size bronze statue of Stubby named "Stubby Salutes," by Susan Bahary, in the Connecticut Trees of Honor Memorial at Veteran's Memorial Park in Middletown, Connecticut, in May 2018. The statue pays tribute to fallen Connecticut veterans, where both Stubby and Robert Conroy are from.

== Animated film ==
Sgt. Stubby: An American Hero is an animated feature-length film based on the life and times of Stubby. Theatrically released on April 13, 2018, the film features the voices of Logan Lerman, Helena Bonham Carter, and Gérard Depardieu, with music by Academy Award nominee Patrick Doyle. The animation is made by the studio Mikros Image and produced by Irish-American studio Fun Academy Media Group.

The film received high marks from film critics and was officially endorsed by several high-profile institutions, including the Humane Society of the United States, the Armed Services YMCA, the Westminster Kennel Club, and the United States World War One Centennial Commission.

The film received generally positive reviews and numerous awards, including the Parents' Choice Foundation Gold Award and The Dove Foundation's All Ages Seal of Approval, despite the film not containing any explicit faith-based messaging.

The series was announced to be developed by writers Scott Christian Sava (Animal Crackers, The Dreamland Chronicles), Audry Taylor (Pet Robots), and David Wise (Teenage Mutant Ninja Turtles, Batman: The Animated Series). Wise died months after the announcement.

== See also ==
- List of individual dogs
- Cher Ami, a carrier pigeon displayed along with Stubby in the Smithsonian Institution's Americans at War: The Price of Freedom exhibit.
- Chips, most decorated dog from World War II
- Dogs in Warfare
- Military animal
- Owney, famous postal mascot dog and world traveler, also on display at the Smithsonian Institution
- Rags (dog)
- Smoky, a WWII Yorkshire Terrier war dog, credited with 12 combat missions and awarded eight battle stars
- Sergeant Reckless, a US Warhorse during the Korean War who earned multiple decorations and retired to acclaim at Marine Corp Base Camp Pendleton, CA
- Sinbad (dog), a WWII United States Coast Guard dog who served aboard USCGC Campbell (WPG-32) with the rank of Chief Petty Officer (E-7), the only other dog besides Stubby who was classified as a non-commissioned officer by an arm of the United States military
- Wojtek, a bear who fought alongside the Polish Land Forces during the latter part of World War II and was eventually promoted to corporal
