= James Robert Conroy =

American soldier and caretaker of Sergeant Stubby

- Born: James Robert Conroy; 1892; United States
- Died: 1987 (aged 94–95)
- Military career
- Allegiance: United States
- Branch: United States Army
- Service years: 1917–1919
- Rank: Corporal
- Units: 102nd Infantry Regiment, 26th Infantry Division
- Conflicts: World War I

The photo of James Robert Conroy

James Robert Conroy (1892–1987) was an American soldier who served in the United States Army during World War I. He is best known for adopting and caring for Sergeant Stubby, one of the most decorated military dogs in American history. Conroy secretly brought Stubby to France, where the dog served alongside the 102nd Infantry Regiment and became internationally known for his actions during the war.

== Early life ==
Little has been published about Conroy's early life before his military service. In 1917, while training with the 102nd Infantry Regiment at Yale University in New Haven, Connecticut, he befriended a stray dog that would later become known as Sergeant Stubby.

== Military service ==
Conroy enlisted in the United States Army during World War I and served with the 102nd Infantry Regiment of the 26th "Yankee" Division. Before his unit departed for France, he secretly smuggled Stubby aboard the troop ship.

After arriving in France, Stubby was discovered by Conroy's commanding officer. According to contemporary accounts, the dog saluted the officer, who allowed him to remain with the regiment.

Throughout the war, Conroy and Stubby participated in numerous campaigns on the Western Front. Stubby became known for warning soldiers of incoming artillery and poison gas attacks, locating wounded soldiers, and helping capture a German spy.

== Life after World War I ==
Following the war, Conroy and Stubby returned to the United States, where they became national celebrities. They appeared in military parades and public events, and Stubby met several U.S. presidents.

Conroy later attended Georgetown University Law Center, where Stubby became the unofficial mascot of the Georgetown Hoyas football team. Conroy also worked as a special agent for the Bureau of Investigation, the predecessor of the Federal Bureau of Investigation (FBI).

After Stubby's death in 1926, Conroy preserved his companion through taxidermy. In 1956, he donated Stubby to the Smithsonian Institution, where the dog remains on public display.

== Legacy ==
James Robert Conroy is remembered primarily for his lifelong association with Sergeant Stubby. His decision to rescue and care for the stray dog led to one of the most celebrated human-animal partnerships in American military history.

== See also ==
- Sergeant Stubby
- 102nd Infantry Regiment (United States)
- 26th Infantry Division (United States)
- Military mascot
- Dogs in warfare
