= Logan Lerman =

American actor (born 1992)

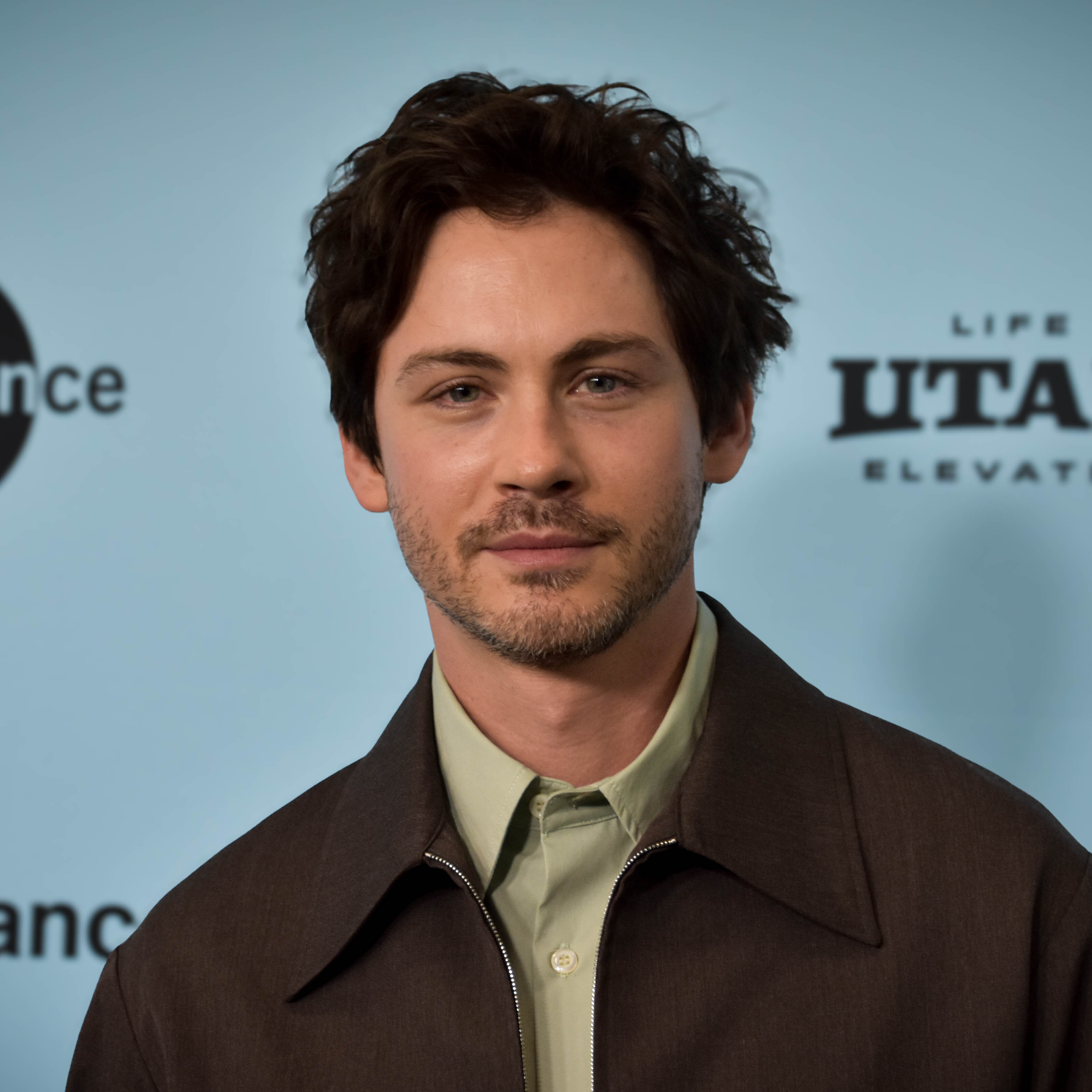
- Lerman in 2025
- Born: Logan Wade Lerman; January 19, 1992 (age 34); Beverly Hills, California, U.S.
- Occupation: Actor
- Years active: 2000–present
- Spouse: Ana Corrigan (m. 2026)

Logan Wade Lerman (born January 19, 1992) is an American actor. He appeared in commercials in the mid-1990s, before starring in the series Jack & Bobby (2004–2005) and the movies The Butterfly Effect (2004) and Hoot (2006). Lerman gained further recognition for playing the title character in the Percy Jackson film series (2010–2013) and d'Artagnan in The Three Musketeers (2011), as well as for starring in the coming-of-age drama The Perks of Being a Wallflower (2012). He had major roles in the films Noah (2014), Fury (2014) and Indignation (2016), and returned to television with the thriller series Hunters (2020–2023).

== Early life and background ==
Lerman was born in Beverly Hills, California. His mother, Lisa (née Goldman), works as his manager, and his father, Larry Lerman, is a businessman and orthotist. He has an older sister and an older brother.

Lerman is Jewish, having had a bar mitzvah ceremony in his youth. His grandparents were born in four different countries. His paternal grandfather, Max Lerman, was born in Berlin, in 1927, to a Polish Jewish family; they left Germany in the 1930s because of the Nazi regime, living in Shanghai until the end of World War II. His paternal grandmother, Mina (née Schwartz), was born in Mexico City to Russian Jewish parents. His maternal grandfather was a Polish Jewish immigrant, and his maternal grandmother was born in Los Angeles, also to a Jewish immigrant family. On his mother's side, he is a relative, by marriage, of twin singers Evan and Jaron Lowenstein.

Lerman has stated that he is a "black sheep" in his household because he is an actor, while most of his relatives work in the medical profession. His family owns and operates an orthotics and prosthetics company, which was founded by his great-grandfather in 1915. He attended Beverly Hills High School. In 2010, he applied to study creative writing at New York University but postponed his attendance.

== Career ==
=== Early work (2000–2008) ===
Lerman had a passion for movies from a young age, though he started acting "just for fun" and "to do something to get out of school". He began auditioning for roles in the late 1990s, and first appeared in commercials. He made his film debut in 2000's The Patriot, playing William Martin, one of the lead character's children. The same year, he appeared in What Women Want. In 2001's Riding in Cars with Boys, he played the son of the main character. Lerman has stated that while appearing in his earliest roles as a child, he did not have "any conscious awareness of what I was doing or what was going on" and "didn't have a good experience".

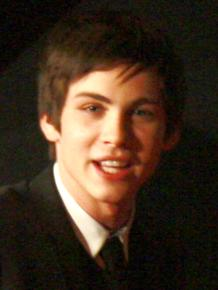
Lerman at the premiere of Percy Jackson & the Olympians: The Lightning Thief in February 2010

In 2003, Lerman played nine-year-old Luke Chandler in the CBS made-for-television film A Painted House, based on the early life of author John Grisham and set in Black Oak, Arkansas in the early 1950s. A Painted House was filmed in Lepanto and Clarksdale, Mississippi, in 2002. A review in the Boston Globe described Lerman as a "promising newcomer" with the Telegraph-Herald commenting on the character having been "quietly and effectively played". For the role, he was nominated for the Young Artist Award for Best Performance by a Leading Young Actor in a television production, and tied with Calum Worthy for the win. He next appeared in the 2004 thriller film The Butterfly Effect, portraying a seven-year-old version of character Evan Treborn. digitallyOBSESSED's reviewer described Lerman as "definitely a child actor to watch".

Lerman had quit acting for a "year or so" in the early 2000s, when he was ten. He made a "conscious decision" to embrace acting as a profession when he was twelve, having developed an interest in the filmmaking process. In 2004, he was cast in the television series Jack & Bobby, playing one of the title roles, Robert "Bobby" McCallister, a 12-year-old "extremely bright social misfit" in Missouri who was destined to become President of the United States as an adult. The show ran on The WB Television Network during the 2004–2005 season, receiving some positive reviews but low ratings, and was subsequently canceled. Lerman was nominated for another Young Artist Award for his performance, tying with Jack DeSena for the win. Lerman has stated that he "started taking things seriously" about his career after appearing on the show. The Boston Herald's reviewer mentioned that Lerman's performance had a "blend of vulnerability and strength", while Entertainment Weekly's reviewer had noted that "Lerman lends Bobby a bedraggled optimism".

Continuing his film work, Lerman had his first starring role in a motion picture, playing Roy Eberhardt in the children's adventure Hoot; his character moves to Florida from Montana and attempts to save endangered burrowing owls. Lerman stated that the film's message is "that you can be any age and make a difference". Hoot began filming in July 2005 in South Florida, opened on May 5, 2006, and won him a third Young Artist Award, this time for Best Performance in a Feature Film – Leading Young Actor (2007). The Washington Post's reviewer commented that "Lerman shows some life as Roy" though his role was "an anomaly in a sea of insipidity", while the San Francisco Chronicle's reviewer disliked Lerman's performance.

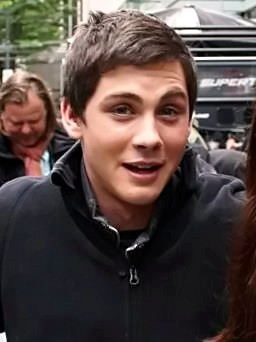
Lerman on the set of Percy Jackson: Sea of Monsters in May 2012

In 2007, Lerman appeared in the thriller The Number 23, in which he played the son of Walter Sparrow, a man who becomes obsessed with numerology. That year, he also appeared in the critically acclaimed western remake 3:10 to Yuma, playing William Evans, a teenager who looks up to criminal Ben Wade while shunning his father; Lerman's character did not exist in the original version of the story. Lerman received positive reviews for his work, and was again nominated for the Young Artist Award – Best Performance in a Feature Film – Leading Young Actor (2008). It was the second consecutive year he received a nomination in that category, although this time he did not win. USA Today stated that he was among the film's "best supporting players", while Rolling Stone gave Lerman a "shout-out" and Newsday stated that he delivers a "credibly explicit note".

In 2008, Lerman co-starred in the comedy Meet Bill as a teenager mentored by Bill. Meet Bill was filmed in 2006, premiered at the Toronto International Film Festival in 2007, and received a theatrical release on April 4, 2008. Hollywood.com stated that, though the film was uneven, Lerman "displays a supreme confidence". In 2009, he appeared in the science fiction film Gamer, as Simon, a teenage gamer who controls one of the characters in a video game played with live human subjects. Also that year, Lerman had a leading role in the comedy My One and Only, playing a teenage character based on actor George Hamilton – depicted as an aspiring writer who, after his parents split, accompanies his mother and brother on a cross-country trip, eventually arriving in Hollywood. Bloomberg's reviewer described Lerman as appealing, with the Los Angeles Times' Betsy Sharkey stating that the character "captures the ease with which an angry teen will use a growing vocabulary to wound a parent".

=== Mainstream success (2009–2016) ===
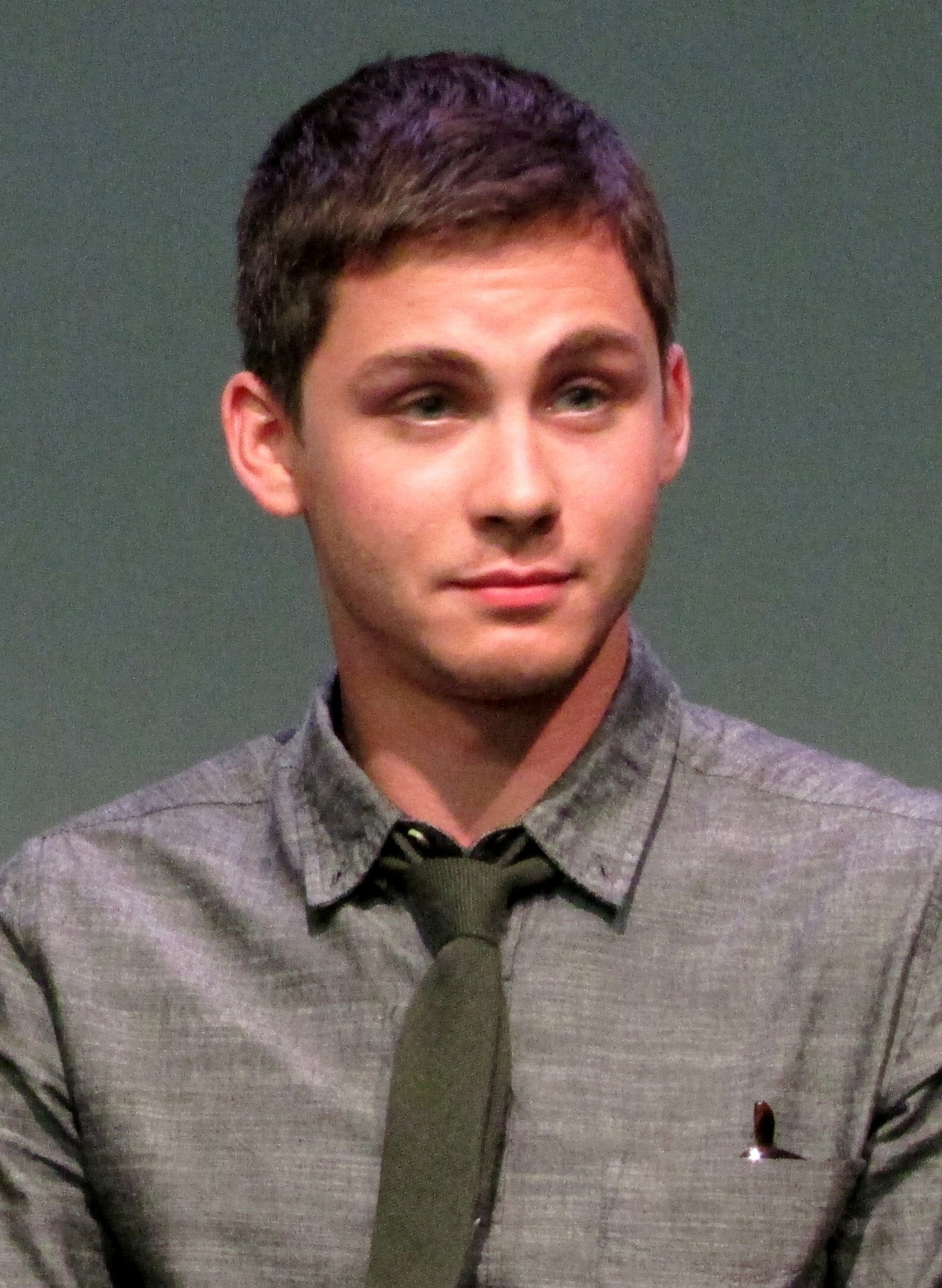
Lerman in July 2013

In spring 2009, Lerman was cast in the lead role as Percy Jackson in Percy Jackson & the Olympians: The Lightning Thief. The movie was filmed in 2009 in Vancouver, British Columbia, and was released in February 2010. Lerman has stated that he was not familiar with the book series when he received the script. During his teenage years, Lerman and his family had viewed his acting work as just a "hobby" before college; his parents had only become more comfortable with acting as a career in 2010, the year of Percy Jackson's release. In August 2010, Lerman appeared in "Change the Odds", a public service announcement video for the Stand Up to Cancer charity.

Lerman's next role was d'Artagnan, in director Paul W. S. Anderson's 3D film version of The Three Musketeers, which was released in the U.S. on October 21, 2011. Lerman was cast in the role without having to audition. He took the role because The Three Musketeers was one of the only books his paternal grandfather had taken with him when he "had to leave his home... as a young kid" in the 1930s. Lerman trained in sword fighting for three months and wore hair extensions to portray d'Artagnan, whom he has described as "the most different character to me that I've ever played". The film received negative reviews, with Michael Phillips of the Chicago Tribune writing that "Lerman already has done solid work... but he's a blank slate here."

Lerman starred in a film adaptation of Stephen Chbosky's novel The Perks of Being a Wallflower, playing the lead role, Charlie; filming took place in 2011, and the movie was released in September 2012. Lerman has described the film as a "life epic, and stated that he had been "torturing [himself] for... a few months in order to get inside Charlie's head." The movie received positive reviews, as did Lerman's performance. Leonard Maltin wrote that Lerman and his co-stars were "soulful" and "lift this film above the norm for coming-of-age stories" while Christy Lemire of the Associated Press wrote that, by the film's end, Lerman "bust[s] out, show[s] some range and reveal[s] he can really, truly act". For his performance, Lerman was nominated for several awards, including Best Young Actor/Actress by the Broadcast Film Critics Association, and won a Teen Choice Award for Choice Movie Actor: Drama.

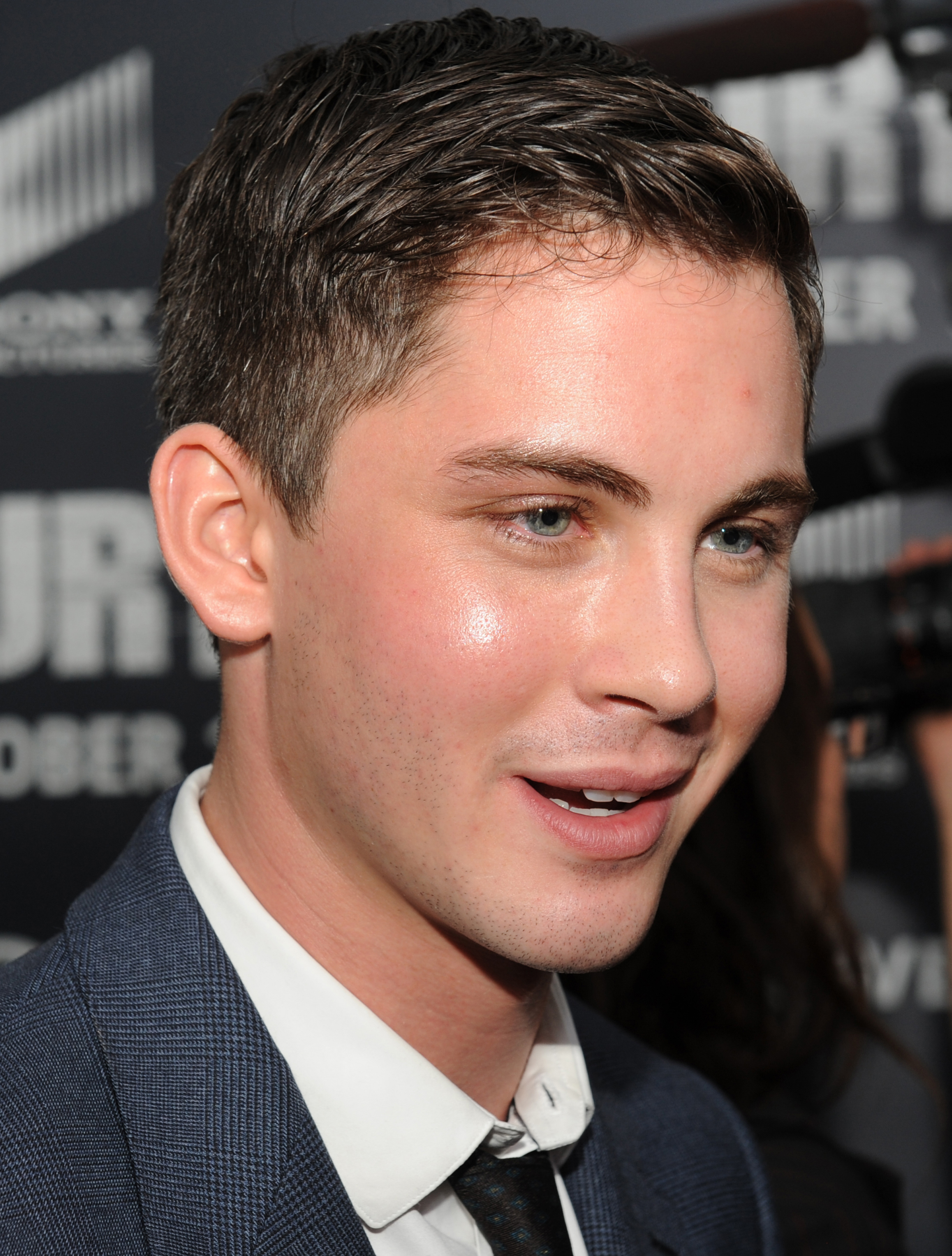
Lerman at the world premiere of Fury in October 2014

Lerman played Lou in the independent drama film Stuck in Love; the film received a limited U.S. release in 2013. Lerman had initially been signed to appear in three Percy Jackson films. The second film in the series, Percy Jackson: Sea of Monsters, was released in August 2013, although no further films in the series have since been produced.

Lerman played Ham, the son of prophet Noah, in the Biblical epic Noah, directed by Darren Aronofsky. Filming took place in 2012, in New York and Iceland, and Noah was released on March 28, 2014, to positive reviews. Lerman next starred in David Ayer's World War II-set film, Fury; in the film, Lerman's character is an American soldier fighting Nazi forces. Filming began in September 2013, and the movie received an October 2014 release. Reviews for Fury were positive; Matt Stieb of the San Antonio Current wrote that Lerman "manages to hold his own" opposite co-star Brad Pitt, and Lerman's performance was described as a "great turn" by Oliver Lyttelton of Indiewire.

Lerman played the lead, Marcus Messner, in Indignation, an adaptation of Philip Roth's 2008 novel of the same name, directed by James Schamus; his character is a student who faces antisemitism and sexual repression while coming of age at a 1950s Ohio college. Filming began in June 2015. Indignation premiered at the 2016 Sundance Film Festival, and was theatrically released in July 2016. It received positive reviews for both the film itself and Lerman's performance, with Tim Grierson of ScreenDaily writing that Lerman's work "seethes with his character's burgeoning arrogance and cynicism" and David Rooney of The Hollywood Reporter stating that Lerman gives "a performance of tremendous focus, maturity and depth of feeling, with exciting flashes of the umbrage that gives the film its title". Lerman also served as one of the film's executive producers, receiving his first such credit.

=== Fluctuations and expansion (2017–present) ===
Lerman played Sidney Hall in Shawn Christensen's feature drama The Vanishing of Sidney Hall (2017). He was also an executive producer for the film, which began production in New York City in April 2016 and premiered on January 25 at the 2017 Sundance Film Festival.

Lerman voiced Robert Conroy, a real-life soldier who worked with World War I hero war dog Sergeant Stubby, in Sgt. Stubby: An American Hero, an animated film which was released on April 13, 2018. In 2018, Lerman signed to star as lead Jonah Heidelbaum in the Amazon Video series Hunters, about a group of Nazi hunters in the 1970s. The show premiered in February 2020. Lerman also starred in two drama films that were released in mid-2020: End of Sentence, in which he plays an ex-convict who travels with his father to Ireland; and Shirley, about author Shirley Jackson, in which he plays one half of a young couple staying in Jackson's unstable household.

Lerman co-produced the drama Press Play (2022) alongside his producing partner Jonathan Schwartz. Also that year, he had a supporting role in the action-thriller Bullet Train. In June 2023, Lerman and Schwartz were announced as producers of the Hollywood thriller Skincare, directed by Austin Peters. In 2025, he starred as the lead of the Sundance Film Festival romantic road comedy Oh, Hi!, directed by Sophie Brooks. It was theatrically released nationwide July 25 via Sony Pictures Classics.

=== Other ventures ===
Lerman is a friend of actor Dean Collins, who played his best friend on Jack & Bobby; they remained close after the series' cancellation, and worked together again on Hoot, where Collins had a supporting role. In their spare time, the two collaborated on comedic short films. As well as acting, they wrote, directed, and shot the videos, often enlisting the help of family and friends. The shorts were uploaded to YouTube under the joint account name of "monkeynuts1069".

In 2006, Collins and Lerman formed a band, Indigo, along with musician Daniel Pashman; Collins sang lead vocals, Lerman played keyboard and guitar, and Pashman played the drums. In 2011, Lerman stated that Indigo is "not a serious band right now" and that music is his biggest passion after film. As of 2009, Lerman reportedly played the piano and in 2011, he revealed himself to be a fan of movie music compositions. Also in 2011, BlackBook magazine wrote that Lerman "aspires to be the head of a [film] studio one day".

== Personal life ==
Lerman is a self-described "film geek", stating in interviews as a late teenager that he had been "shaped by movies" and that he considered himself to be a "creative person". In 2010, Lerman expressed an interest in being involved in "everything that goes into making a film" – wanting to write, produce, and direct. His favorite directors at that time included Paul Thomas Anderson, Stanley Kubrick, David Fincher and Peter Bogdanovich. In 2009, Lerman cited American Beauty, Defending Your Life and Eternal Sunshine of the Spotless Mind as being among his favorite films.

In 2011, Lerman described himself as "reserved and quiet", "a homebody", and "not a big fan of sports".

In November 2023, Lerman announced his engagement to his longtime girlfriend Ana Corrigan. In June 2026, they were married.

== Filmography ==
=== Film ===
Year	Title	Role	Notes and awards
2000	The Patriot	William Martin	Nominated – Young Artist Award for Best Ensemble in a Feature Film
2000	What Women Want	Young Nick Marshall	
2001	Riding in Cars with Boys	Jason (age 8)	
2004	The Butterfly Effect	Evan Treborn (age 7)	
2006	Hoot	Roy Eberhardt	Young Artist Award for Best Leading Young Actor in a Feature Film
2007	Meet Bill	The Kid	
2007	The Number 23	Robin Sparrow	
2007	3:10 to Yuma	William Evans	Nominated – Screen Actors Guild Award for Outstanding Performance by a Cast in a Motion Picture; Nominated – Young Artist Award for Best Leading Young Actor in a Feature Film
2009	Gamer	Simon Silverton	
2009	My One and Only	George Deveraux (age 15)	
2010	Percy Jackson & the Olympians: The Lightning Thief	Percy Jackson	Nominated – MTV Movie Award for Best Breakthrough Performance; Nominated – MTV Movie Award for Best Fight (shared with Jake Abel); Nominated – Saturn Award for Best Performance by a Younger Actor; Nominated – Teen Choice Award for Choice Movie: Fight (shared with Jake Abel); Nominated – Teen Choice Award for Choice Movie: Breakout Male
2011	The Three Musketeers	d'Artagnan	Nominated – Teen Choice Award for Choice Movie Actor: Action
2012	The Perks of Being a Wallflower	Charlie Kelmeckis	San Diego Film Critics Society Award for Best Performance by an Ensemble; Teen Choice Award for Choice Movie Actor: Drama; Nominated – Broadcast Film Critics Association Award for Best Young Performer; Nominated – MTV Movie Award for Best Kiss (shared with Emma Watson); Nominated – MTV Movie Award for Best Musical Moment (shared with Emma Watson and Ezra Miller); Nominated – Teen Choice Award for Choice: Liplock (shared with Emma Watson); Nominated – Washington D.C. Area Film Critics Association Award for Best Youth Performance
2013	Percy Jackson: Sea of Monsters	Percy Jackson	
2013	Stuck in Love	Lou	
2014	Noah	Ham	
2014	Fury	Norman Ellison	National Board of Review Award for Best Cast; Santa Barbara International Film Festival Virtuosos Award; Nominated – Phoenix Film Critics Society Award for Best Supporting Actor
2016	Indignation	Marcus Messner	Also executive producer
2017	The Vanishing of Sidney Hall	Sidney Hall	Also executive producer
2018	Sgt. Stubby: An American Hero	Robert Conroy	Voice role
2019	End of Sentence	Sean Fogle	
2020	Shirley	Fred Nemser	
2022	Press Play	—	Producer
2022	Bullet Train	The Son	
2024	Skincare	—	Producer
2025	Oh, Hi!	Isaac	

=== Television ===
Year	Title	Role	Notes and awards
2003	The Flannerys		Television film
2003	A Painted House	Luke Chandler	Television film Young Artist Award for Best Performance in a TV Movie, Miniseries or Special – Leading Young Actor (tied with Calum Worthy)
2003	10-8: Officers on Duty	Bobby Justo	Episode: "Badlands"
2004–2005	Jack & Bobby	Bobby McCallister	Main role Young Artist Award for Best Performance in a TV Series (Comedy or Drama) – Leading Young Actor (tied with Jack DeSena)
2020–2023	Hunters	Jonah Heidelbaum	Main role
2024	We Were the Lucky Ones	Addy	Main role Nominated – Critics' Choice Television Award for Best Supporting Actor in a Movie/Miniseries
2025	Only Murders in the Building	Jay Pflug	Recurring role
