= Scott Christian Sava =

American animator and illustrator

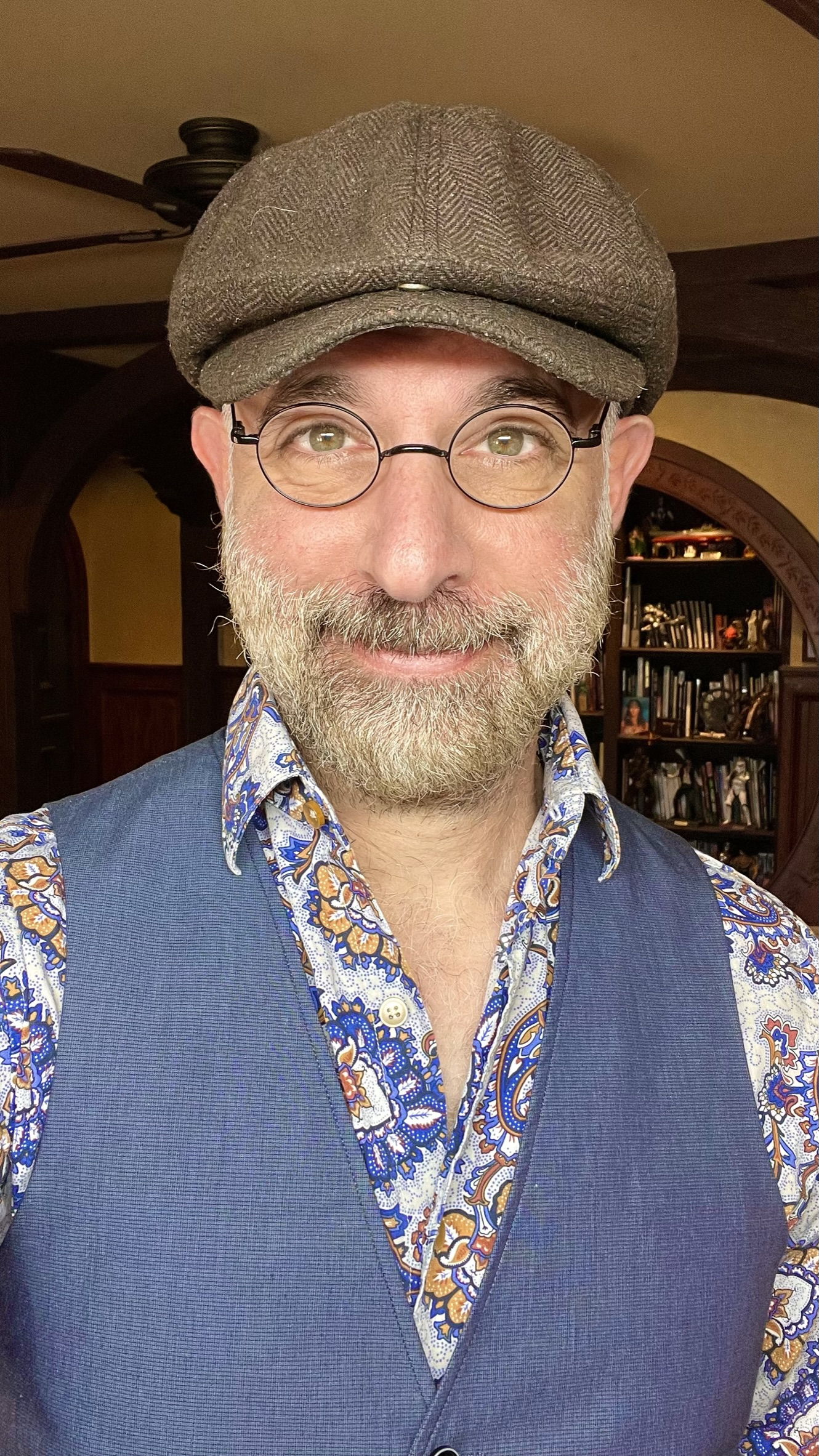
- Sava in 2023
- Born: Scott Christian Sava; December 4, 1968 (age 57)
- Education: Academy of Art University San Francisco
- Notable work: Animal Crackers; The Dreamland Chronicles
- Spouse: Donna Lynne Sava
- Children: 2
- Website: www.ssavaart.com

Scott Christian Sava (born December 4, 1968) is an American animator, illustrator, director, and producer. Sava is known for his graphic novel comic and animated film, Animal Crackers that appeared on Netflix.

== Education ==
Scott Christian Sava attended the Academy of Art University in San Francisco, California during the 1980s where he studied to become a painter.

== Career ==
Sava illustrated Marvel's Spider-Man: Quality of Life comics and worked to design covers for Star Trek. Sava also wrote and illustrated The Dreamland Chronicles comics. Sava also wrote the books Hyperactive and Cameron and His Dinosaurs. His YouTube channel has over two million subscribers.

Animal Crackers was directed by Sava and Tony Bancroft. Animal Crackers aired on Netflix on July 24, 2020 starring John Krasinski as Owen Huntington, and Emily Blunt as Zoe Huntington, Ian McKellen as Horatio Huntington, as well as Danny DeVito as Chesterfield, and Sylvester Stallone as Bulletman.

== Personal life ==
Sava was born in Yonkers, New York, and now lives in Franklin, Tennessee, with his family. Sava was diagnosed with autism at the age of 53.
