= The Dreamland Chronicles =

Comic series by Scott Christian Sava

- Author(s): Scott Christian Sava
- Website: thedreamlandchronicles.com
- Current status/schedule: Completed
- Launch date: January 5, 2006
- End date: September 7, 2017
- Publisher(s): Blue Dream Studios
- Genre(s): Fantasy

The Dreamland Chronicles is an all-ages fantasy webcomic and comic book series created by Scott Christian Sava with 3D computer graphics.

== Plot summary ==
The Dreamland Chronicles is about a college student, Alex, who returns to a realm of dreams after eight years. There he discovers his childhood friends such as Nastajia the elf princess, Paddington the rock giant, Kiwi the fairy and Felicity the catgirl. Together they battle against the evil dragon King Nicodemus; in the real world, Alex must work with fellow university students Nicole (a psychology major) and Dan (his fraternal twin brother) in finding a means to influence and access events in Dreamland. Along the way, the characters in both realms become entangled in the politics of Dreamland. The story is inspired by Winsor McCay's early twentieth century newspaper comic Little Nemo.

== Critical reaction ==
Publishers Weekly has described The Dreamland Chronicles as "deftly paced, sprinkled with just the right amount of action, clever suspense and innocuous romance" and described the computer generated artwork as "creat[ing] a world of beautifully detailed environments and colorful characters".

School Library Journal gave a more mixed review, writing that "the characters have a lively sense of 'acting'" and "the settings are composed with a significant eye for detail", but they criticized the character designs as "more like plastic toys than CGI characters", and the dialogue that "veers between functional and hokey".

Sequential Tart praised the story, saying that although the characters appeared "fairly generic" at first, they "gradually show that they have a lot of depth and inner conflicts".

The comic was nominated for four awards in the 2006 Web Cartoonist's Choice Awards. The Dreamland Chronicles also won Best Graphic Novel of 2006 in the Comics Buyer's Guide 25th Annual Fan Awards.

== Books ==
Sava has self-published six volumes of The Dreamland Chronicles. The first, released in 2006, collects the first four chapters. The second, released in 2007, collects chapters 5–8. The third, released in 2009, collects chapters 9–12.

== About the author ==
Sava studied illustration at the Academy of Art University in San Francisco. In 2001 he created 3D computer art for the comic book The Lab from Astonish Comics. He has also worked on video games, the Casper animated film sequels, and computer-generated artwork for the Spider-Man: Quality of Life comic book miniseries for Marvel Comics with writer Greg Rucka. In 2007 Sava and Diego Jourdan released Ed's Terrestrials, an all-ages comic about three runaway aliens and a boy, named Ed, who helps them. The two also released Pet Robots, a comic book about four military robots who bond with four kids on a field trip to a toy factory. Disney has picked up the rights for a Pet Robots film.
