= 102nd Infantry Regiment (United States) =

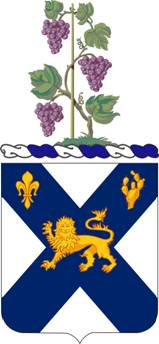
- Coat of arms
- Active: 1672–present
- Country: United States
- Branch: U.S. Army
- Type: Infantry
- Motto: "Stand Forth"
- Mascot: Sergeant Stubby
- Engagements: American Revolution; American Civil War; World War I World War II; Operation Enduring Freedom

Commanders
- Notable commanders: Hiram I. Bearss

Insignia
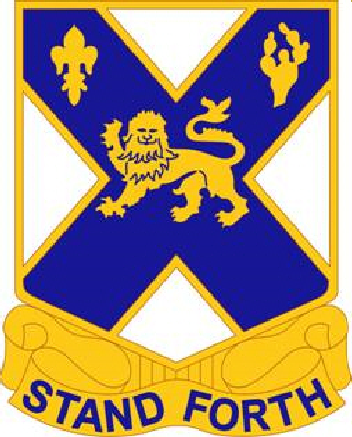
- Distinctive unit insignia

The 102nd Infantry Regiment currently consists of one battalion in the Connecticut National Guard. In the modern U.S. Army regimental system, regimental designation is used only in historical tradition, and there is no regimental headquarters or staff. It is one of several National Guard units with colonial roots. The 1st Battalion, 102nd Regiment is headquartered in New Haven, Connecticut. Its mascot is Sergeant Stubby.

== Service history ==
=== World War I ===
In August 1917, the Regiment was organized with 3,755 officers and enlisted men:

- Headquarters & Headquarters Company- 303
  - Supply Company- 140
  - Machine Gun Company- 178
  - Medical & Chaplain Detachment- 56
- Infantry Battalion (x3)- 1,026
  - Headquarters- 2
  - Rifle Company (x4)- 256

The 102nd was stationed at the Neufchateau, Vosges Training Area during the fall and winter of 1917 with the 26th Division also known as the "Yankee Division" which included the 101st, 103rd and 104th infantry regiments.

They were then deployed in March 1918 to the Chemin des Dames area where the men had their first experience with defensive and offensive operations and with poison gas. Next they were deployed in April 1918 to the Toul Sector in the American sector near the Beaumont Zone. They fought at Seicheprey. Next the 102nd was deployed in July 1918 to the Chateau Thierry area and were involved in the battles of the Champagne-Marne, Aisne-Marne, and the Second Battle of the Marne (15 July – 6 August). They fought at Trugny, Épieds, and the La Fere Forest. Next the 102nd was deployed to Saint-Mihiel fighting at the Battle of Saint-Mihiel, then the Troyon Sector and finally at Verdun.

=== Between the wars ===
The 102nd Infantry arrived at the port of Boston on 7 April 1919 on the U.S.S. Agamemnon and demobilized at Camp Devens, Massachusetts on 29 April 1919. The regiment was reconstituted in the National Guard in 1921 as the 170th Infantry, assigned to the 43d Infantry Division, and allotted to the state of Connecticut. It was reorganized on 20 October 1922 by withdrawal of the 2nd Infantry Regiment, Connecticut National Guard, from the 169th Infantry Regiment (organized 23 May 1921 by consolidation and redesignation of the 1st and 2nd Infantry Regiments as the Connecticut Regiment of Infantry; redesignated 169th Infantry on 7 October 1921) and redesignating it as the 170th Infantry. Regimental headquarters organized 8 June 1923 and federally recognized at New Haven, Connecticut.

The 170th Infantry was redesignated as the 102nd Infantry on 28 February 1924. The regiment, or elements thereof, were called up to perform the following state duties: riot control during a textile workers strike in Putnam, in September 1934; flood relief at Hartford from 19 March–1 April 1936; hurricane relief in the vicinity of Rockville from 22–27 September 1938. The regiment conducted annual summer training most years at Niantic between 1921–38. It was inducted into federal service at home stations on 24 February 1941 and moved to Camp Blanding, Florida, where it arrived on 15 March 1941.

=== World War II ===
The 102nd Infantry was dispatched to the Charleston Port of Embarkation, South Carolina, on 15 January 1942, less most of the 3rd Battalion, which was used to activate elements of the 91st Infantry Regiment. The 102nd Infantry departed Charleston on 19 January 1942 as a part of Task Force 5614, arriving at Bora Bora in the Society Islands, part of French Polynesia, on 17 February 1942. As a part of the Army's reorganization of its infantry divisions from the four-regiment square division to the three-regiment triangular division, the 102nd Infantry was officially relieved from the 43rd Infantry Division on 19 February 1942 and assigned to the General Headquarters Reserve. On 1 October 1943, the regiment was assigned to III Island Base Command, moving to Espiritu Santo, Vanuatu, on 8 April 1944, where it was then assigned to the South Pacific Base Command. The 102nd arrived in Hawaii on 22 November 1944 where it was assigned to the Central Pacific Base Command and the Combat Training Command located there. Company K subsequently served on Leyte Island, Philippines, and was inactivated there on 10 April 1945. The remainder of the regiment, less the 2nd Battalion, was concurrently inactivated in Hawaii on 10 April 1945, while the 2nd Battalion was inactivated on 30 June 1946.

In July 1943, the regiment was organized with 3,256 officers and enlisted men:

- Headquarters & Headquarters Company- 111
  - Service Company- 114
  - Anti-Tank Company- 165
  - Cannon Company- 118
  - Medical Detachment- 135
- Infantry Battalion (x3)- 871
  - Headquarters & Headquarters Company- 126
  - Rifle Company (x3)- 193
  - Weapons Company- 156

=== Post War Service ===
The 1948 organization of the regiment under TOE 29-7T called for a strength of 3,774 officers and enlisted men organized as below:

- Headquarters & Headquarters Company- 289
  - Service Company- 186
  - Tank Company- 148
  - Heavy Mortar Company- 190
  - Medical Company- 214
- Infantry Battalion (x3)
  - Headquarters & Headquarters Company- 119
  - Rifle Company (x3)- 211
  - Weapons Company- 165

=== Global War on Terrorism ===
In 2005, the battalion mobilized at Fort Bragg and then deployed in early 2006 to Afghanistan in support of Operation Enduring Freedom. The companies supported Provincial Reconstruction Teams (PRT's) across Afghanistan.

In 2006, the 86th Infantry Brigade Combat Team (Mountain) was reorganized from a "heavy" brigade to a specialized light infantry formation. The 1–102nd Infantry was added as the brigade slowly formed from 2006, transitioning to the 42d Infantry Division.

The 86th IBCT mobilized in December 2009 at Camp Atterbury, Indiana and completed a Joint Readiness Training Center rotation at Fort Polk prior to deployment in support of Operation Enduring Freedom. The regiment was then assigned and operated as part of ISAF Task Force Iron Grey in the RC EAST region of Afghanistan’s Hindu Kush region. Soldiers from the regiment performed security, reconstruction and assistance to Provincial Reconstruction Teams and the local populace and government in its designated AOR. The brigade returned home in December 2010 after being replaced by 2nd IBCT, 34th ID.

=== Current Assignment ===
As part of the 2020 Army Force Structure Realignment, the 86th IBCT – which includes the 1-102d IN – was moved in 2016 from the 42d ID to the 10th Mountain division. The regiment is currently subordinate to the 85th Troop Command, Connecticut Military Department, headquartered in Hartford, CT.

The regiment is currently organized with six companies located throughout the State:

- 1st Battalion, 102nd Infantry Regiment (Mountain), in New Haven (part of 86th Infantry Brigade Combat Team (Mountain))
  - Headquarters and Headquarters Company, 1st Battalion, 102nd Infantry Regiment (Mountain), in New Haven
  - Company A, 1st Battalion, 102nd Infantry Regiment (Mountain), in Danbury
  - Company B, 1st Battalion, 102nd Infantry Regiment (Mountain), in Middletown
  - Company C, 1st Battalion, 102nd Infantry Regiment (Mountain), in New Britain
  - Company D (Weapons), 1st Battalion, 102nd Infantry Regiment (Mountain), in Middletown
  - Company H (Forward Support), 186th Brigade Support Battalion, in Southington

== Lineage ==
- Organized 26 June in the Connecticut Militia as Regiment of New Haven County
- Reorganized as the 2nd Regimental Militia on 11 October 1739 from existing companies in the Connecticut Colony
- Reorganized in 1816 and again in 1847 without material change
- Organized as the 2nd Connecticut Volunteers on 7 May 1861 and mustered out on 7 August 1861
- Organized as the 20th Connecticut Volunteers on 8 September 1862 and mustered out 13 June 1865
- Reorganized as the 2nd Infantry in 1865
- Redesignated as the 58th Pioneer Infantry and 102nd Infantry Regiment on 22 August 1917 and assigned to the PDCA Troops and 26th Infantry Division, respectively
- Demobilized as the 58th Pioneer Infantry 8 January 1919 at Camp Wadsworth, South Carolina
- Reconstituted in the National Guard on 25 November 1921, assigned to the 43rd Division, and allotted to the state of Connecticut
- Reorganized on 23 May 1921 by consolidation and redesignation of the 1st and 2nd Infantry Regiments as the Connecticut Regiment of Infantry
- Redesignated as the 169th Infantry Regiment on 7 October 1921
- Lineage of 2nd Infantry Regiment withdrawn from the 169th Infantry Regiment to form the 170th Infantry Regiment (hereafter separate lineage)
- Redesignated 102nd Infantry Regiment on 28 February 1924
- Relieved from the 43rd Infantry Division and consolidated with the 963rd Field Artillery Battalion to form the 102nd Infantry on 1 May 1959
