= Animal Crackers (2017 film) =

2017 animated film

- Theatrical release poster designed by Sava
- Directed by: Scott Christian Sava; Tony Bancroft
- Written by: Scott Christian Sava; Dean Lorey
- Produced by: Scott Christian Sava; George Lee; Marcus Englefield; Jamie Thomason; Leiming Guan; Jaime Maestro; Nathalie Martinez; Ty Accornero
- Starring: Emily Blunt; Danny DeVito; John Krasinski; Ian McKellen; Sylvester Stallone; Patrick Warburton; Raven-Symoné; Harvey Fierstein; Wallace Shawn; Gilbert Gottfried; Tara Strong; James Arnold Taylor; Kevin Grevioux; Lydia Rose Taylor
- Edited by: Ximo Romero
- Music by: Bear McCreary
- Production companies: Blue Dream Studios; Storyoscopic Films; Odin's Eye Animation; Mayday Movies; Exit Strategy; Beijing Wen Hua Dongrun Investment Co.; China Film Group Corporation
- Distributed by: Netflix
- Release dates: June 12, 2017 (Annecy); July 21, 2018 (China); July 24, 2020 (United States)
- Running time: 105 minutes
- Countries: United States; Spain; China; Australia
- Language: English
- Budget: $17 million
- Box office: $14 million

Animal Crackers is a 2017 animated fantasy comedy film directed by Scott Christian Sava and Tony Bancroft, written by Sava and Dean Lorey and based on the animal-shaped cookie (and also loosely on the graphic novel by Sava). The film features the voices of John Krasinski, Emily Blunt, Danny DeVito, Ian McKellen, Sylvester Stallone, Patrick Warburton, Raven-Symoné, Harvey Fierstein, Wallace Shawn, Gilbert Gottfried, Tara Strong, James Arnold Taylor, Kevin Grevioux, and Lydia Rose Taylor in her film debut. It tells the story of a family who comes across a box of magical animal crackers that turns anyone that consumes a cracker into the animal that the cracker represents and this animal handily saves the circus that the family was associated with.

The film premiered at the Annecy International Animation Film Festival on June 12, 2017. It was released in China on July 21, 2018. It was released on Netflix on July 24, 2020, to mixed-to-positive reviews from critics.

On November 8, 2024, it was announced a sequel originally titled Animal Crackers 2 is currently in production and was set for 2026. On November 14, 2025, it was announced that the film was retitled as Animal Crackers 2: The Next Batch and was delayed to 2027.

== Plot ==
In 1962, brothers "Buffalo" Bob and Horatio Huntington ran a successful traveling circus, despite their vastly different personalities. After a show, the circus' Romani fortune-teller Esmeralda presents her niece Talia to her employers, asking them to give her a job. Bob and Horatio are immediately smitten with Talia, but Talia is only interested in Bob. When the pair announces their plans to marry in 1964, Horatio becomes furious and gives Bob an ultimatum, asking him to choose between him and Talia. Bob marries Talia, and Esmerelda gives them a mysterious box as a wedding gift, which allows them to open a new circus. Buffalo Bob's circus is known for animals performing amazing and seemingly impossible feats.

Years later, Bob's nephew Owen marries his childhood friend Zoe at the circus, where they first met as children. Owen is browbeaten into working as a taste tester for Zoe's father, Mr. Woodley, at his dog biscuit factory to prove his worth to his future father-in-law.

A few years later, Horatio, whose luck and success have taken a severe downturn since his fight and split with Bob, sneaks into Bob and Talia's dressing rooms, trying to find the secret to the animals, and accidentally starts a fire that seemingly kills Bob and Talia. Their funeral is attended by Owen, Zoe, and their daughter Mackenzie. Horatio unexpectedly visits and announces that he will be taking over the circus. Huntington and his henchmen start a fight, causing the Huntingtons to leave.

Before they leave, circus pets Old Blue and Zena give the Huntingtons the mysterious box, and they later discover it holds animal crackers. Owen eats one and turns into a hamster. The Huntingtons return to the circus to figure out how this happened. They learn from the clown Chesterfield that the animal crackers transform the user into the animal they represent, but the box contains only one human cracker to change them back. This is the secret to the circus' success; the human performers taking turns transforming themselves into animals to perform the acts.

After Buffalo Bob's circus reopens, Owen reluctantly decides to eat the animal crackers and performs stunts as an animal. By the end of the day, Owen grows to like it and decides to quit his job. As he finishes packing up, Brock unwittingly eats one of the animal crackers and turns it into a mandrill. To catch up with him, Owen turns into a lion, but Brock is captured by Mario Zucchini, who also steals animal cracker pieces. Upon returning home, Owen soon discovers he has lost his human cracker and has no way to return to his human form. Binkley discovers the animal crackers and persuades Mr. Woodley to attend the circus.

At one performance, Horatio appears and offers Owen his human cracker in exchange for the circus. Owen refuses, thinking that remaining an animal will at least keep his family together. Horatio initiates Plan B, where Owen is forced into the deal by Horatio's henchmen. The circus performers then come across the scene, and a fight breaks out.

As his henchmen are defeated, Horatio eats some animal crackers and turns into a six-limbed Chimera. He is then confronted by Old Blue and Zena, who reveal themselves as Bob and Talia, alive but trapped in animal form due to the destruction of their human crackers in the fire. They ask Horatio to redeem himself, but he refuses despite being horrified by what happened. Horatio flies up while grasping them. Owen uses Bullet Man in his black rhinoceros form to shoot down Horatio as he, Horatio, and Bob land in the net while Mackenzie turns into a Golden snub-nosed monkey to save Talia. Owen, Zoe, Mackenzie, and the circus performers work together to subdue Horatio. Having witnessed the performance, Mr. Woodley reevaluates his views on Owen and the circus.

By the next show, they made animal crackers that caused the eater's skin to temporarily take on the color and patterns of the animal whose crackers they eat. Owen consumes a new animal cracker in the box and takes the stage as a dragon.

== Cast ==
- John Krasinski as Owen Huntington, MacKenzie's father, Zoe's husband, Talia's step-nephew, Horatio and Buffalo Bob's nephew and new owner of the circus.
  - Brendan Sava portrays young Owen.
- Emily Blunt as Zoe Huntington, MacKenzie's mother, Owen's wife, Talia's stepniece-in-law, Horatio and Buffalo Bob's niece-in-law.
  - Noelle Ellison Thomason portrays young Zoe.
- Danny DeVito as Chesterfield, the circus's funniest clown who had gotten fat from the foods that he ate.
- Ian McKellen as Horatio P. Huntington, Buffalo Bob's older brother, Owen's uncle, Zoe's uncle-in-law, and Mackenzie's great uncle who was envious of his brother's success. He hates it when Zucchini calls him his "henchman" and keeps correcting him because he is his master, not his henchman. Horatio's Chimera form has the head of a white-maned lion, the horns of a Bighorn sheep, the tail, legs and body of a crocodilian, the wings of a bat, and the humanoid arms of a Komodo dragon.
- Sylvester Stallone as Bulletman, a human cannonball who wears a bullet-shaped helmet.
- Patrick Warburton as Brock, a big strong personal assistant of Mr. Woodley who likes to pick on Owen and Binkley.
- Raven-Symoné as Binkley, Zoe's childhood friend and Owen's co-worker who works to make dog biscuits to impress Mr. Woodley.
- Wallace Shawn as Mr. Woodley, Zoe's father, Mackenzie's grandpa, and Owen's father-in-law who runs a dog biscuit factory. He originally did not like that Owen was Zoe's husband and kept calling Owen a "deadly man", but later accepted it later in the film.
- Harvey Fierstein as Esmeralda, a Rom fortune teller who is Talia's aunt and is the one who gave Bob the magical animal crackers, which he got from Tibet.
- Gilbert Gottfried as Mario Zucchini, a dwarf motorcycle rider who thinks Horatio is his minion, which is actually the other way around as Horatio keeps correcting him. When Mario ate the broken pieces of the animal crackers, he sported the head and paws of a snowshoe hare and the shell and back legs of a tortoise.
- Tara Strong as Talia, Esmeralda's niece, Buffalo Bob's girlfriend, later second wife, Owen's step-aunt, Zoe's step-aunt-in-law and Mackenzie's great step-aunt who is trapped in the form of a cat named Zena. She speaks with a soft Italian accent.
- James Arnold Taylor as Buffalo Bob, Talia's husband, Horatio's younger brother and Owen's uncle/former owner of the circus, Zoe's uncle-in-law and Mackenzie's great uncle who is trapped in the form of a bloodhound named Old Blue.
- Kevin Grevioux as Samson, a strongman with a beard and no hair who is one of Horatio's henchmen. When Samson ate the broken pieces of the animal crackers, he sported the head of a Texas Longhorn and the arms of a mountain gorilla, giving him a Minotaur-like appearance.
- Lydia Rose Taylor as Mackenzie Huntington, Owen and Zoe's daughter, Mr. Woodley's granddaughter, Talia's great step-niece, Buffalo Bob and Horatio's great niece.
- Tony Bancroft as Stabby (uncredited in the Netflix release), a knife thrower and one of Horatio's henchmen. When Stabby ate the broken pieces of the animal crackers, he sported the head, stomach, and tail of a Saltwater crocodile and the torso and paws of a Bengal tiger.
- Anthony Sava as El Diablo, a fire breather in a devil-like outfit and one of Horatio's henchmen. When El Diablo ate the broken pieces of the animal crackers, he sported the head of a frog and bat wings in place of arms.
- Donna Lynne Sava as Petunia (uncredited in the Netflix release), a fat lady who Mario is attracted to.
- Alyssa Trama as Gretchen, a former bearded lady.
- Noelle Ellis Thomas as Girl in Crowd (uncredited in the Netflix release)
- Logan Sava as Kid in Crowd (uncredited in the Netflix release)
- Kim Sava as Mom in Crowd

Additional voices by Cam Clarke, Lara Cody, Debi Derryberry, Jessica Gee, Grant George, Max Koch, Brianne Siddall, and Jennie Yee

== Production ==
=== Development and writing ===
In 2011, Scott Christian Sava wrote a comic book for Animal Crackers, but was unable to garner any interest. In June 2013, Harvey Weinstein had seen a short film of the screenplay made by Sava and two months later the Weinstein brothers made an offer to buy the rights to Animal Crackers. Sava co-directed the film with Tony Bancroft and co-wrote the screenplay with Dean Lorey.

Financing the movie were executive producers Mu Yedong on behalf of Wen Hua Dongrun Investment Co., La Peikang, board chairman of China Film Co., and Sam Chi for Landmark Asia.

Despicable Me character designer, Carter Goodrich, was hired in October 2014.

=== Pre-production ===
The voice cast was completed by casting director Jamie Thomason who also serves as the voice director.

In the last week of October and throughout November 2014, Sava via the Animal Crackers Facebook page, there were sneak peeks to the look of some characters along with announcing the voice cast for those characters Kevin Grevioux as Samson the Strong Man, James Arnold Taylor as Buffalo Bob, Tara Strong as Talia, Harvey Fierstein as Esmerelda the Fortune Teller, Gilbert Gottfried as Mario Zucchini, and Raven-Symoné as Binkley.

On November 6, 2014, Blue Dream Studios announced Sylvester Stallone, Danny DeVito, and Ian McKellen as lead voice cast. On February 3, 2015, John Krasinski and Kaley Cuoco joined the cast as Owen and Zoe Huntington, respectively. On March 30, 2015, Emily Blunt replaced Cuoco due to a scheduling conflict.

"When I was writing Animal Crackers I had specific voices in my head. Certain characters I wrote with actors in mind. Horatio was always Sir Ian McKellen. Brock was totally Patrick Warburton. Bullet-Man could be no one else but Stallone! To find out that each and every one of these actors have agreed to come on board this film and bring these characters to life… I'm flipping out," said Sava.

It was announced via Sava's Facebook page that his son, Brendan, would play 12-year-old Owen Huntington and his wife, Donna, would play the Fat Lady. On May 22, 2015, it was revealed that Wallace Shawn had been cast as Mr. Woodley, Zoe's (Blunt) father.

=== Animation ===
The film's animation was created in Autodesk Maya, and rendered with Arnold. In an effort to save costs, it was produced at Blue Dream Studios Spain, a 5,000-square foot house in Valencia that the director, Sava, founded in early 2014. More than 120 animators worked on the film.

=== Filming ===
On January 27, 2015, Sava announced on Facebook via the Animal Crackers page that first day of "studio sessions with the actors" began in Los Angeles.

== Music ==
The film's original score was composed by Bear McCreary, and its soundtrack includes original songs by Toad the Wet Sprocket, Huey Lewis and the News, Howard Jones, and Michael Bublé.

=== Soundtrack ===
Animal Crackers: Original Motion Picture Soundtrack

Soundtrack album by Various artists
- Released: July 17, 2020
- Recorded: 2015–2016
- Genre: Film soundtrack
- Length: 46:25
- Label: Sony Masterworks

Track listing
No.	Title	Music	Length
1.	"Welcome" (John Adair version)	Ian McKellen	2:08
2.	"While We're Young"	Huey Lewis and the News	3:40
3.	"Like That"	Fleur East	3:08
4.	"The Tractor"	Chris McDougall, Leslie Austin, Dayan Kai	2:39
5.	"Master of the Ring"	Connor Clark	2:50
6.	"Could've Been Mine"	Ian McKellen, Gilbert Gottfried	2:09
7.	"We're in This Together"	Howard Jones	4:52
8.	"Don't Stop Me Now" (2011 remaster)	Queen	3:12
9.	"One of Those Days"	Toad the Wet Sprocket	2:42
10.	"Today (Is Yesterday's Tomorrow)"	Michael Bublé	3:22
11.	"Lost and Found"	Katie Herzig	4:43
12.	"Animal Crackers Overture"	Bear McCreary	5:22
13.	"Papa Bear"	Bear McCreary	2:57
14.	"Showtime"	Bear McCreary	2:23
Total length:			46:25

=== Score ===
Animal Crackers: Original Motion Picture Score

Film score by Bear McCreary
- Released: July 17, 2020
- Recorded: 2017
- Genre: Score
- Length: 1:14:03
- Label: Sony Classical

Bear McCreary chronology
Fantasy Island: Original Motion Picture Soundtrack (2020)	Animal Crackers: Original Motion Picture Score (2020)

All tracks written and composed by Bear McCreary.

Track listing
No.	Title	Length
1.	"Animal Crackers Overture" (Extended Version)	5:51
2.	"The Huntington Brothers"	3:28
3.	"Life at the Circus"	3:59
4.	"The Dog Food Factory"	4:54
5.	"News of the Fire"	1:45
6.	"Circus Memorial"	3:58
7.	"Holy Moly"	2:35
8.	"Zucchini Chase"	4:16
9.	"Little Cookie Me"	3:22
10.	"The Magic Is Gone"	3:01
11.	"Brock and Woodley"	3:43
12.	"Papa Bear" (Extended Version)	3:13
13.	"A Helping Hoof"	1:58
14.	"The Tiger"	3:14
15.	"Monkeying Around"	3:58
16.	"An Offer From Horatio"	3:40
17.	"Freak Fight"	3:54
18.	"Chimera"	5:57
19.	"Showtime" (Extended Version)	6:40
Total length:		1:12:58

Bonus tracks
No.	Title	Length
20.	"Fanfare for Bulletman"	0:45
21.	"Blue Dream Studios Logo"	0:20
Total length:		1:14:03

== Release ==
=== Theatrical ===
The film had its world premiere in competition at the Annecy International Animated Film Festival on June 12, 2017.

The film found it difficult to find a distributor in North America. It was initially picked up by The Weinstein Company in 2013 and was going to be released in 2017 before moving over to Relativity Media and originally being set to be released on April 28, 2017. However, a financial crisis within the company prevented them from releasing the film. It was then set to be released on September 1, 2017, by upstart film studio Serafini Releasing before they also shut down. A few months later, in November 2017, it was announced that Entertainment Studios would distribute the film worldwide. In April, Sava posted on Facebook that the film was set for a release date of August 10, 2018. The deal with Entertainment Studios was dropped in June 2018.

Eventually, the distribution rights were bought by Netflix and the film was released on July 24, 2020, on the platform. It was the second-most streamed film on its opening weekend.

=== Home media ===
The film was released on digital and on-demand on April 18, 2023, by Lionsgate and Gravitas Ventures. Allied Vaughn would later release the film on DVD and Blu-Ray on October 3, 2023. These releases were not authenticated or approved by director Scott Christian Sava, and are presumed to be licensed through investor Mayday Productions or another unknown outside entity.

== Reception ==
=== Critical response ===
On the review aggregator website Rotten Tomatoes, the film holds an approval rating of 67% based on 22 reviews, with an average rating of 6.00/10. It had a critical consensus which read: "Animal Crackers is far from the most distinctive animated fare, but its wacky humor and zippy speed make it a decent diversion for younger viewers." On Metacritic, the film has a weighted average score of 60 out of 100 based on 5 critics, indicating "mixed or average" reviews.

In Annecy 2017 movie review, Jordan Mintzer of The Hollywood Reporter states that the story is "mostly predictable directions despite the limited pleasure of seeing those mighty morphin power crackers in action." He also noted that the filmmakers seem to have "put more thought into the livelihood of their snacks than they did into the main characters, who mostly come across as stock cartoon types." Overall, he stated about the film could be considered "passable enough, though it's far from the level of Sausage Party or Cloudy With a Chance of Meatballs, to name some other edible animation tales." Peter Debruge of Variety Magazine wrote that it's "uniquely suited to the medium of animation, considering that live action (even heavily CG-embellished live action) simply wouldn't support all those dramatic transformations […] and the wonderfully anthropomorphic behavior each of those species requires." He also wrote that the film "asserts its own identity, combining some of the most distinctive voices with an ensemble of personality-rich, sequel-ready characters. And best of all: Absolutely no animals were harmed in the making of this film."

Renee Schonfeld of Common Sense Media gave the film three stars out of five, describing a "fantastical tale has wacky characters, music, and cartoon peril." Nell Minow of RogerEbert.com rated the film three stars out of four, saying that the character designs are "average" and the action scenes are "energetic and staged with a strong sense of space." She also noted that the subplot "drags a little […] in the middle of Horatio's plot […]." David Ehrlich of IndieWire gave the film a rate 2.5 stars out of 5 (Grade: B−), stating that the movie is "turned out kind of…decent." He saids that the film is "something of a musical. Imagine the spirit of "The Greatest Showman" with the graphics of "Mario Kart 64" and you'll be on the right track." He noted that the animation is "low-budget kids fare," while the script is "decent" and "some delightful voicework." He also noted that the ending is "much like "The Odyssey," the long and bloodsoaked journey of "Animal Crackers" has a reasonably happy ending." Jack Bottomley of Starburst Magazine rated the film also three stars out of five, saying that it's "not perfect but it's a good directorial debut for Sava that is ultimately fun and offers families a wacky afternoon's viewing, with an uplifting final note and, in these tough times, that's a good thing to strive for and achieve." He says about the film's screenplay is "does not re-invent the wheel here, and it does take a little time to build up the steam it needs as it heads towards its cracker-induced animal shapeshifting concept." He also saws about a "few moments when it occasionally threatens to dampen some creatively exciting ideas with a few different sub-plots and techniques but eventually they bring it together nicely for a grand climax…which is actually kind of appropriate considering the plot." He praised the climax, animation, and character designs that "remind a bit of the work of Laika." Likewise, the film's composer Bear McCreary called it "moments too and meshes well with some good visual colour and pop." Patrick Gibbs of SLUG Magazine reviewed the film about the animation is "not Pixar level, but it's good enough, with its own style and sensibilities and lots of colorful imagery." He also noted that the voice cast is "delightful," and the "goofy premise allows for some very fun moments that are a blast for kids." John Serba of Decider wrote the film that it's "kind of a mess." He also wrote that the animation is "modest budget," the themes are "relegating any potential," and the plot is "ill-defined amongst a lot of rubble." He enjoys how it's "blend of musical sequences and occasionally problematic depictions of circus artists reminded [him] of both The Greatest Showman and Tod Browning's Freaks."

== Sequel ==
In 2025, a sequel was announced to be in the works titled Animal Crackers 2: The Next Batch, scheduled for release in 2027, with Iuvit Media Sales in Naples, Italy securing sales and as the executive producer, Blue Dream Studios producing, and Hampa Studio in Valencia, Spain handling animation services.

Viva Pictures is handling North American distribution.
