= Seicheprey =

- Commune
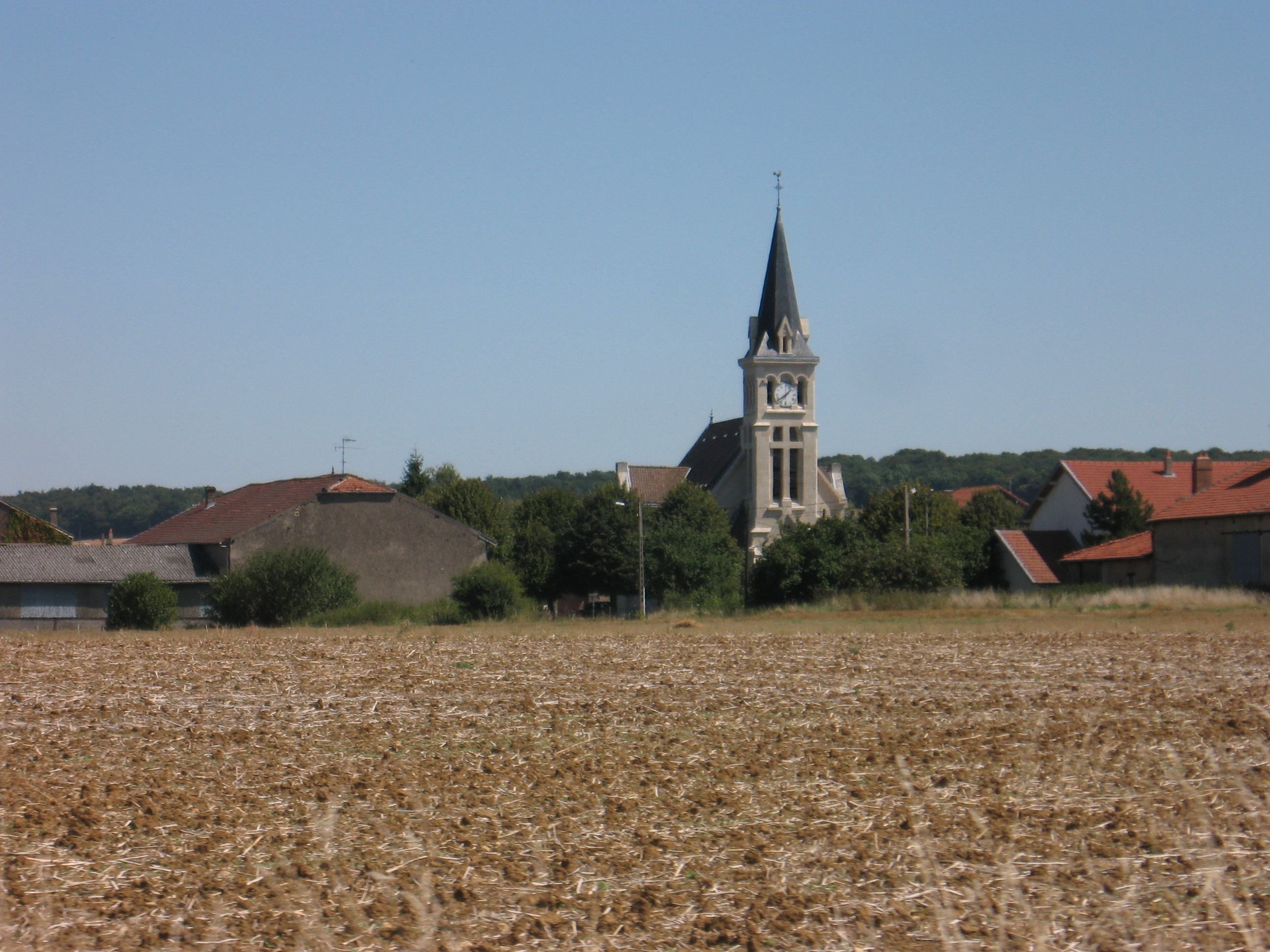
- The church in Seicheprey

- Coat of arms
- Location of Seicheprey
- Location within France Location within Grand Est
- Coordinates: 48°52′15″N 5°47′30″E
- Country: France
- Region: Grand Est
- Department: Meurthe-et-Moselle
- Arrondissement: Toul
- Canton: Le Nord-Toulois
- Intercommunality: Mad et Moselle

Government
  - Mayor (2020–2026): Gérard Andre
- Area^{1}: 8.35 km^{2} (3.22 sq mi)
- Elevation: 250 m (820 ft)
- Highest elevation: 303 m (994 ft)
- Lowest elevation: 229 m (751 ft)
- Population (2023): 104
  - Density: 12.5/km^{2} (32.3/sq mi)
- Time zone: UTC+01:00 (CET)
  - Summer (DST): UTC+02:00 (CEST)
- INSEE/Postal code: 54499 /54470
- ^{1} French Land Register data, which excludes lakes, ponds, glaciers > 1 km^{2} (0.386 sq mi or 247 acres) and river estuaries.

Seicheprey (French pronunciation: [sɛʃpʁɛ]) is a commune in the Meurthe-et-Moselle department in north-eastern France.

== See also ==
- Communes of the Meurthe-et-Moselle department
- Parc naturel régional de Lorraine
