= Jacob Ford Kent =

United States Army general

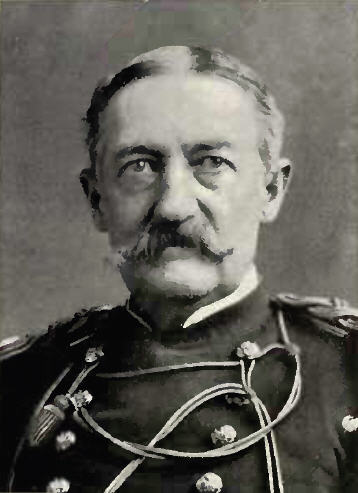
- Brigadier Jacob F. Kent
- Born: September 14, 1835; Philadelphia, Pennsylvania, US
- Died: December 22, 1918 (aged 83) Troy, New York, US
- Buried: United States Military Academy Cemetery
- Allegiance: United States of America; Union
- Branch: United States Army; Union Army
- Service years: 1861–1898
- Rank: Major General
- Commands: 24th Infantry Regiment
- Conflicts: American Civil War: First Battle of Bull Run; Battle of Fredericksburg; Indian Wars; Spanish–American War: Battle of San Juan Hill; Siege of Santiago; Philippine–American War

Jacob Ford Kent (September 14, 1835 – December 22, 1918) was an American general during the Spanish–American War. Kent also served in the Union army during the American Civil War.

== Early life and the American Civil War ==
Kent was born in 1835 in Philadelphia, Pennsylvania to Rodolphus Kent and Sarah Deily. His Great-Great-Grandfather was Col. Jacob Ford, of Morristown, NJ (whose home was General George Washington's headquarters 1779–80). He attended the United States Military Academy at West Point. He graduated in 1861 and served in the Union army during the Civil War. He was first appointed to the 3rd U.S. Infantry in 1861 and later transferred to staff duty as an assistant inspector general in 1863. Kent won brevet promotions during the war for "gallant and meritorious service" at the battles of Marye's Heights, Spotsylvania and Petersburg. He ended the war as a brevet colonel assistant inspector general.

== Indian Wars ==
Following the Civil War Kent returned to field duty with the 3rd U.S. Infantry with the rank of captain. He served on the frontier in Montana, Colorado and Nebraska. In 1885 Kent was promoted to major of the 4th U.S. Infantry and stationed at Fort Omaha. While he was posted in Nebraska the Ghost Dance War took place culminating in the Wounded Knee Massacre. Major Kent and Captain Frank D. Baldwin were placed in charge of charge of the Wounded Knee investigation by Major General Nelson A. Miles.

== Spanish–American War and later life ==
When war with Spain began in May 1898, Kent was appointed brigadier general of volunteers and assumed command of the First Division of the Fifth Army Corps, destined for Cuba. His forces landed at Daiquirí and at the Battle of San Juan Hill his division led the main attack on San Juan Hill while the Rough Riders led the attack on nearby Kettle Hill. Kent's division sustained heavy casualties during the assault: Hamilton S. Hawkins, commanding the First Brigade, was severely wounded and Colonel Charles A. Wikoff, commanding the Third Brigade, was killed; within half an hour, three more officers were to assume command of the latter brigade. However U.S. forces took the heights and Kent's division participated in the subsequent Siege of Santiago. He was appointed brigadier general in the Regular Army in October, 1898. He was transferred to the Philippines where he briefly served before he retired late in 1898. Kent died in 1918.
