= Round-Robin Letter (Spanish–American War) =

Incident in the US Army in 1898

The Round-Robin Letter is the name of an incident in the United States Army that occurred between July 28 and August 3, 1898, during the Spanish–American War. After disease incapacitated thousands of Army soldiers in the wake of the Siege of Santiago, high-ranking officers of Fifth Army Corps drafted a round robin demanding that the unit be sent back to the United States. Public release of the letter embarrassed the U.S. government.

By July 28, 1898, malaria and yellow fever were rife among U.S. Army troops garrisoned near Santiago de Cuba on the island of Cuba. Fifth Corps, to which the Rough Riders was attached, had 4,270 men seriously ill (and dying), and corps commanders feared the unit could be wiped out if it stayed in Cuba. The McKinley administration, however, planned to keep the corps in Cuba until peace negotiations with Spain concluded. Public opinion was also against bringing home an army infected with yellow fever.

Several senior officers met with Major General William R. Shafter, commander of Fifth Corps, and unanimously asked that the corps be withdrawn to the United States. It is unclear whether Shafter agreed and asked for this in writing, or whether Shafter disagreed and the corps commanders decided to put their request in writing. Colonel Theodore Roosevelt (commander of the First Volunteer US Cavalry Rough Riders), the only non-general officer of the group, was asked by the rest of the group to draft a round-robin letter outlining the problems with living conditions and disease to send to Army Headquarters in Washington, D.C. The letter would also be deliberately leaked to the press.

As a volunteer, Roosevelt's career would not be at stake in the way a regular army officer's would be by the communication. (Some sources say there is doubt that Roosevelt was the author, while others say that Roosevelt was only the author of the abridged letter.) Nine generals and Roosevelt signed the letter. An abridged version was given to Shafter to present to the United States Secretary of War. Shafter declined to do so, but did communicate with his superiors about what was happening.

The letter was deliberately leaked to Associated Press correspondents at corps headquarters, who cabled it to the U.S., where it was published nationwide. Publication of the round-robin letter turned public opinion against the War Department.

The McKinley administration was outraged by the leak of the round-robin letter, but quickly realized that the public would blame the government. The administration acted swiftly to try to defuse the situation. On July 28, Secretary of War Russell A. Alger cabled Shafter and ordered Fifth Corps home to Camp Wikoff on Long Island, New York, for quarantine and mustering out. On August 3, the day before the letter appeared in the press, Alger ordered construction of barracks at Camp Wikoff to begin and for United States Navy ships to head to Cuba to retrieve Fifth Corps. The first units departed on August 7. Alger claimed that the round-robin letter did not accelerate administration plans to repatriate the corps. This appears disingenuous, however, as Alger had long asserted that naval ships were unavailable to bring the troops home.

One side effect of the Round-Robin Letter is that Alger refused to endorse Roosevelt's nomination for the Medal of Honor. Roosevelt would only receive the honor posthumously, with it being awarded 2001.

== See also ==
- Brett Crozier, captain of an aircraft carrier who wrote a similar letter which leaked to the media during the COVID-19 pandemic

== Bibliography ==
- Golay, Michael. Spanish–American War. rev ed. New York: Infobase Publishing, 2009.
- Jeffers, H. Paul. Colonel Roosevelt: Theodore Roosevelt Goes to War, 1897-1898. New York: John Wiley & Sons, Inc., 1996.
- Lane, Jack C. Armed Progressive: General Leonard Wood. Lincoln, Neb.: University of Nebraska Press, 2009.
- "Round Robin." In Historical Dictionary of the Spanish American War. Donald H. Dyal, Brian B. Carpenter, and Mark A. Thomas, eds. Westport, Conn.: Greenwood Press, 1996.
- Wintermute, Bob A. "Round-Robin Letter." In The Encyclopedia of the Spanish–American and Philippine–American Wars: A Political, Social, and Military History. Spencer Tucker, ed. Santa Barbara, Calif.: ABC-CLIO, 2009.
