= Fifth Army Corps (Spanish–American War) =

Formation of the U.S. Army during the Spanish-American War

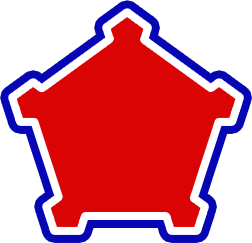
- Active: May 7, 1898 – October 3, 1898
- Country: United States of America
- Branch: Army of the United States
- Type: Corps
- Role: Infantry
- Size: 840 officers, 18,619 enlisted men (as of July 1898)
- Engagements: Spanish–American War; Santiago Campaign; Battle of San Juan Hill; Battle of El Caney; Siege of Santiago

Commanders
- Notable commanders: William Rufus Shafter

Insignia
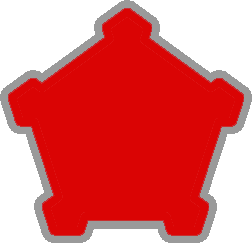
- Fifth Corps 1st Division

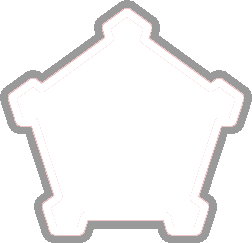
- Fifth Corps 2nd Division

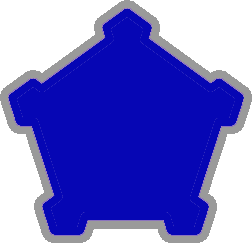
- Fifth Corps 3rd Division

The Fifth Army Corps was a formation of the United States Army raised for the Spanish–American War, and noted chiefly for its victory in the Siege of Santiago, which led to the general collapse of the Spanish war effort.

== Assembly and Formation ==
As relations between Spain and the United States deteriorated in the spring of 1898, the leaders of the U.S. Army began to plan for its first large-scale campaign since the Civil War, which had ended more than 30 years previously. On April 15, 1898, the regiments of the Regular Army were ordered to various assembly points in the South, with only a handful of units to remain at their peacetime posts. Seven regiments of infantry were ordered to Tampa, Florida and Brigadier General James F. Wade assigned to command the assembled troops. Two weeks later, Brigadier General William Rufus Shafter, at the time commanding the troops assembling at New Orleans, was directed to Tampa and assume command.

Five more regiments were ordered to Tampa on May 10 from Camp Thomas, Georgia (in the Chickamauga Battlefield Park), where the troops assembled had been formed into a provisional corps, the first command larger than brigade-size the Army had organized since the Civil War.

Meanwhile, following the declaration of war, General Order 36 of May 7 had approved the organization of eight "army corps," each of which was to consist of three or more divisions of three brigades each. Each brigade was to have approximately 3,600 officers and enlisted men organized into three regiments and, with three such brigades, each division was to total about 11,000 officers and men. Thus the division was to be about the same size as the division of 1861, but army corps were to be larger. The division staff initially was to have an adjutant general, quartermaster, commissary, surgeon, inspector general and engineer, with an ordnance officer added later. The brigade staff was identical except that no inspector general or ordnance officer was authorized.

General Order 46 of May 16, 1898 assigned commanding officers and training camps to the new corps. Major General William R. Shafter was named as commander of Fifth Army Corps, which assumed control of the troops assembling at Tampa, Florida.

== Organization ==
1st Division - BG Jacob Ford Kent

- 1st Brigade - BG Hamilton S. Hawkins
  - 6th United States Infantry Regiment
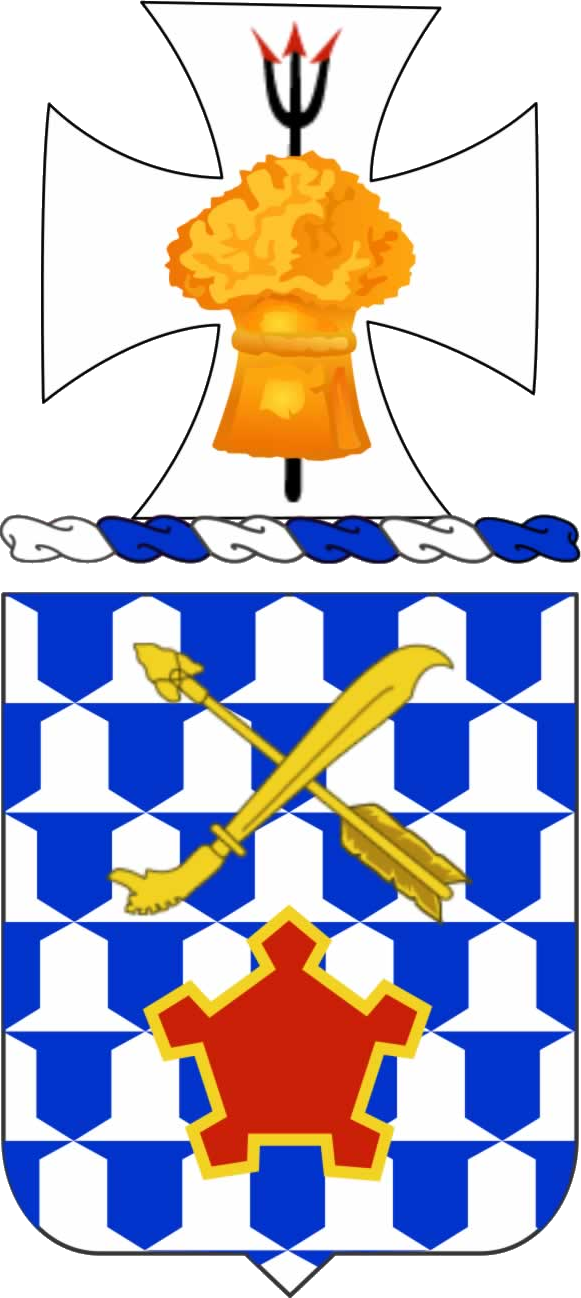
  - 16th United States Infantry Regiment
  - 71st New York Infantry Regiment
- 2nd Brigade Col. Edward P. Pearson
  - 2nd United States Infantry Regiment - Col John C. Bates
  - 10th United States Infantry Regiment
  - 21st United States Infantry Regiment
- 3rd Brigade Col. Charles A. Wikoff
  - 9th United States US Infantry - Col. William Powell
  - 13th United States Infantry Regiment
    - Parker's Gatling Gun Detachment
  - 24th United States Infantry Regiment (Colored)

2nd Division BG Henry W. Lawton

- 1st Brigade BG William Ludlow
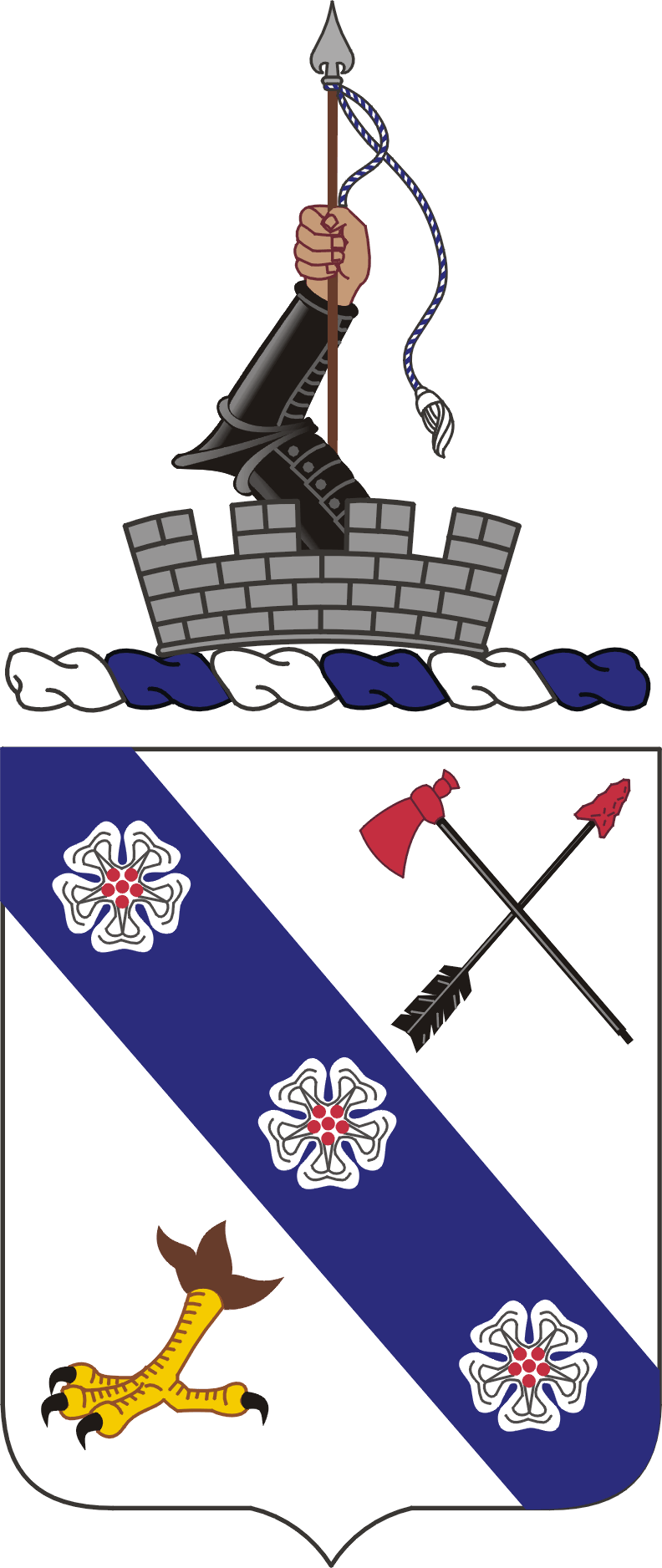
  - 8th United States Infantry Regiment
  - 22nd United States Infantry Regiment
  - 2nd Massachusetts Vol. Infantry
- 2nd Brigade Col. Nelson A. Miles
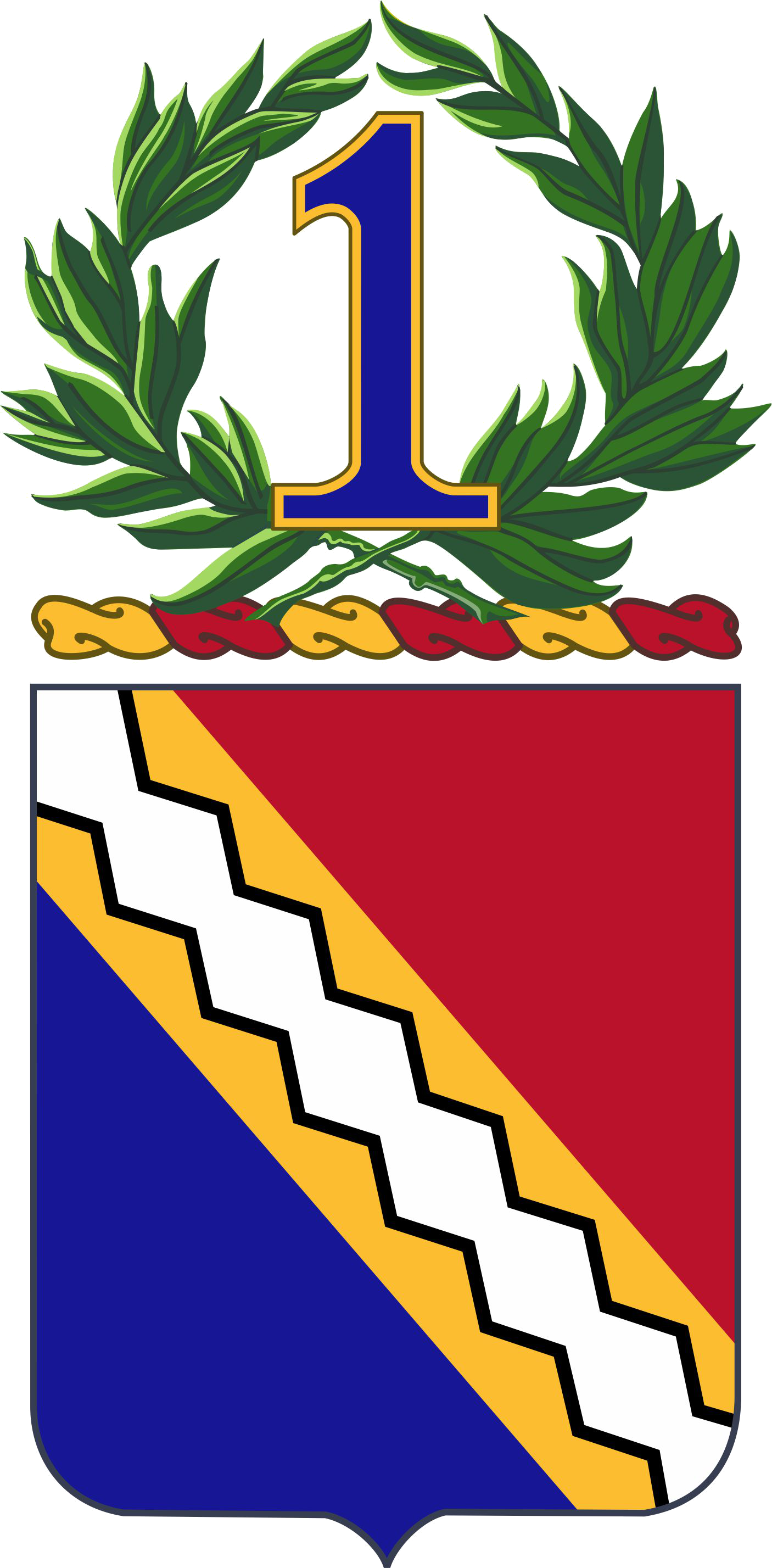
  - 1st United States Infantry Regiment
  - 4th United States Infantry Regiment
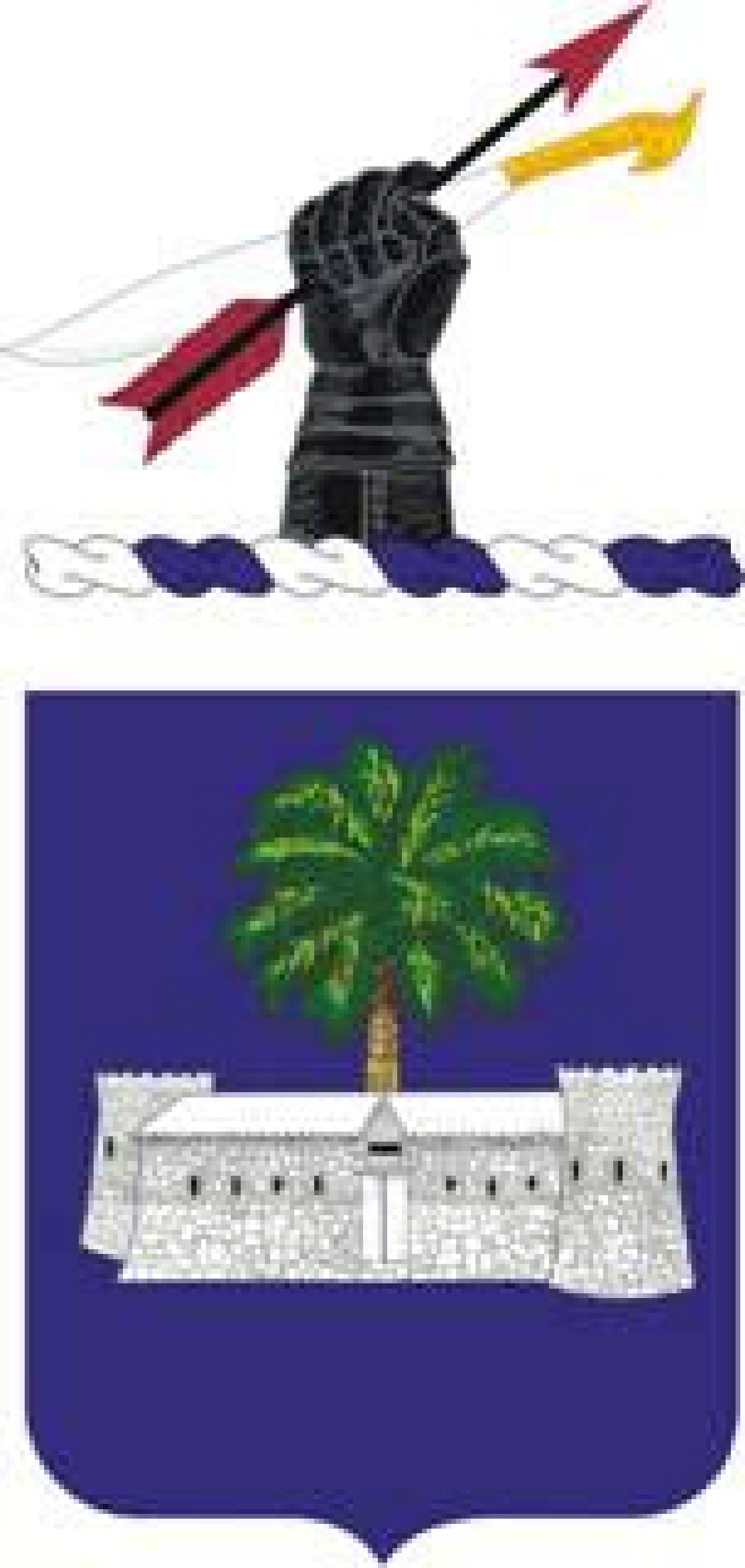
  - 25th United States Infantry Regiment
- 3rd Brigade BG Adna Chaffee
  - 7th Infantry Regiment
  - 12th Infantry Regiment
  - 17th Infantry Regiment

Cavalry Division (Third Div.) (dismounted) MG Joseph Wheeler

- 1st Brigade BG Samuel S. Sumner
  - 3rd Cavalry Regiment
  - 6th Cavalry Regiment
  - 9th Cavalry Regiment (colored)
- 2nd Brigade Colonel Leonard Wood
  - 1st Cavalry Regiment
  - 10th Cavalry Regiment (colored) John J. Pershing
    - Apache Scouts
  - 1st Volunteer Cavalry "Rough Riders" Col. Teddy Roosevelt
  - 1st Illinois Volunteer Infantry Regiment
- Artillery Battalion (Maj. Dillenback)
  - 1st Artillery, Light Battery E
  - 1st Artillery, Light Battery K
  - 2nd Artillery, Light Battery A
  - 2nd Artillery, Light Battery F
- Siege Train
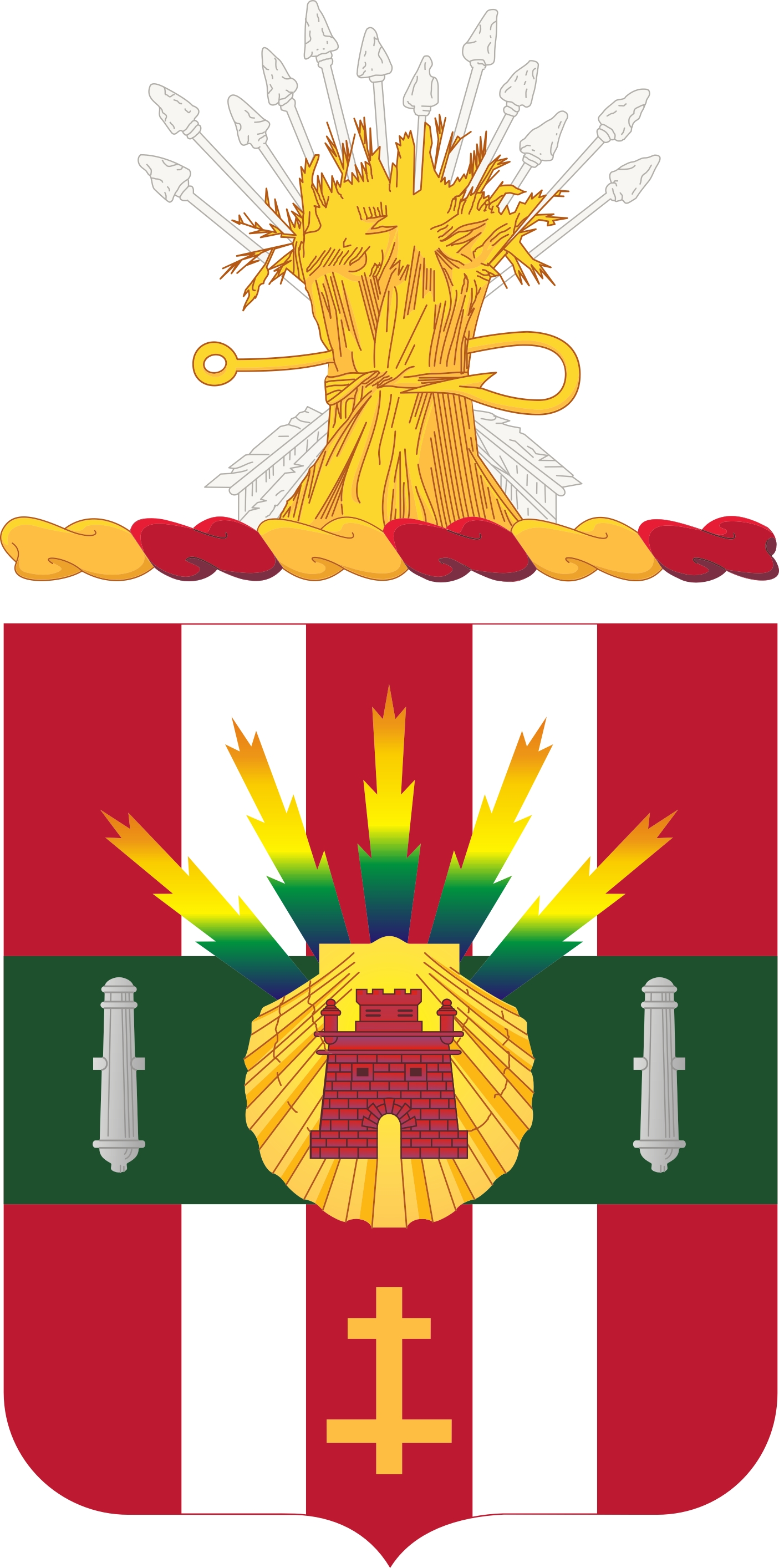
  - 4th Artillery, Battery G
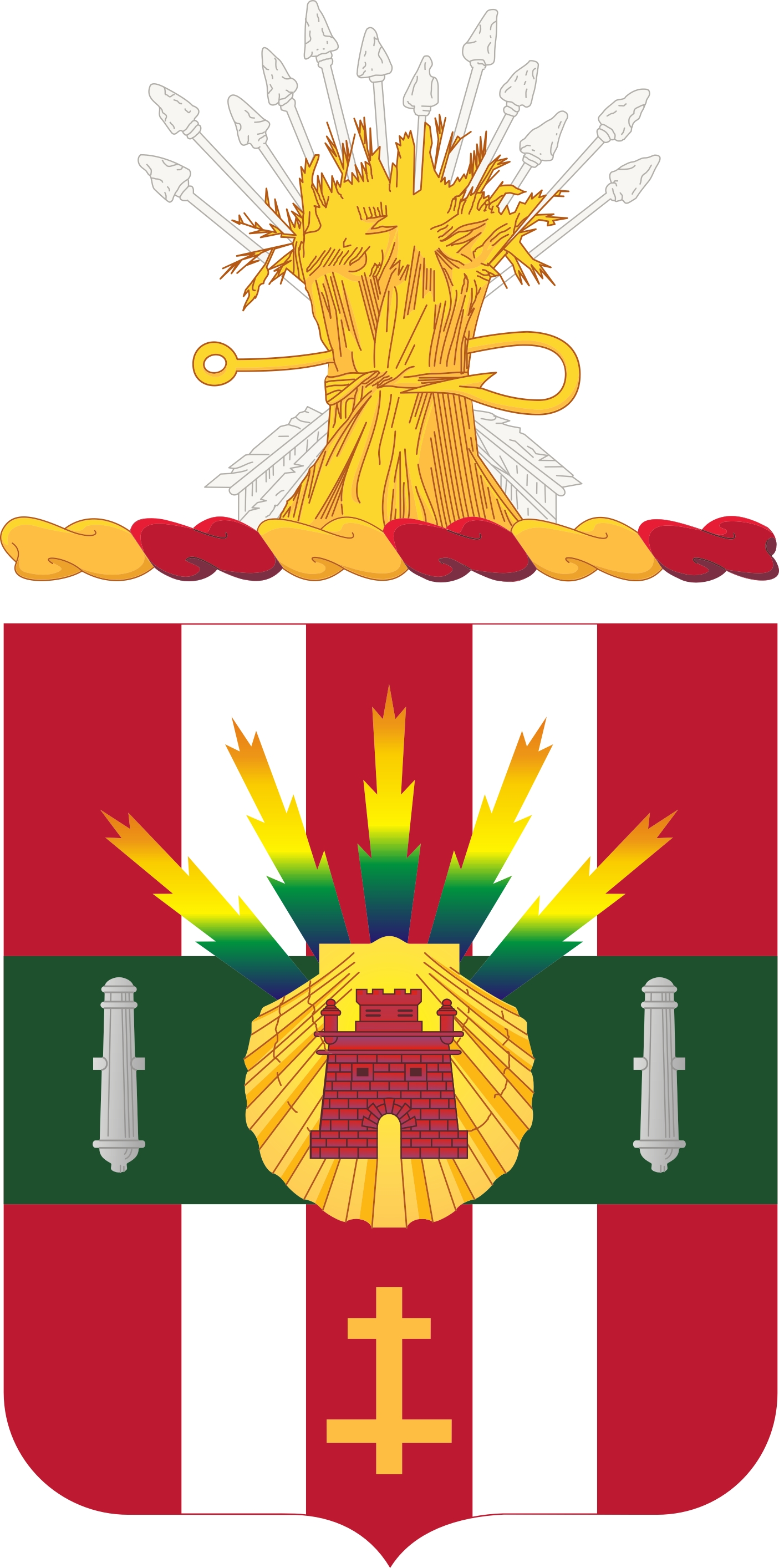
  - 4th Artillery, Battery H
- Independent Brigade (part of IV Army Corps, attached to V Corps)
  - 3rd US Infantry Regiment
  - 20th US Infantry Regiment
- First Marine Battalion - Lt. Col. Robert W. Huntington

== Embarkation and Landing ==
On June 7, the corps began embarking on transports for the landing in Cuba, although this took a week (due to a combination of poor organization by senior officers and fears of an attack by the Spanish fleet, which was capable of no such activity) and the fleet did not sail until June 14. Reaching Cuban waters without incident, the troops began landing at Daiquiri on June 22.

== Evacuation and Quarantine ==
As the troops continued to suffer from disease, including yellow fever misdiagnosed as malaria, it was decided to return the men of Fifth Army Corps to the United States and a site on Montauk Point, Long Island was chosen, being convenient to the Long Island Rail Road and in theory, an easy location to quarantine; Camp Wickoff was established there and the corps completed its movement into quarantine camp on August 24, 1898. As men recovered, units were mustered out of service; by September 30, the corps strength was 218 officers and 5,136 enlisted men.

Fifth Army Corps was "discontinued" on October 3, 1898.
