= Santiago Surrender Tree =

Former tree in Santiago de Cuba

Coordinates: 20°1′22″N 75°48′4″W

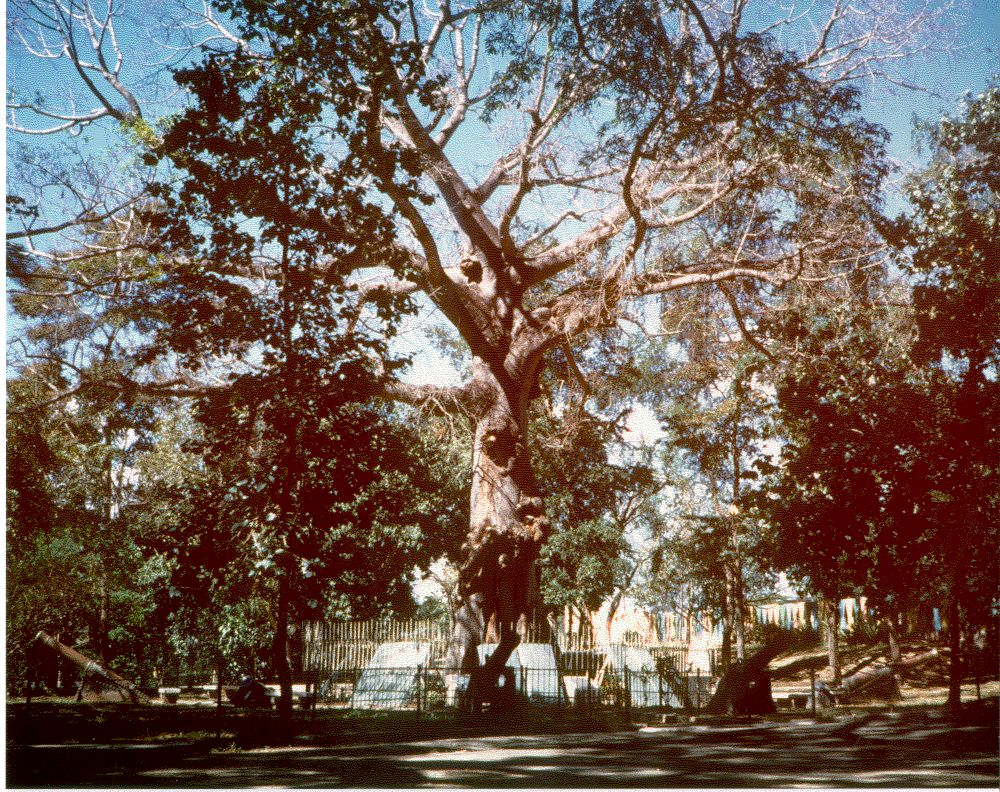
Santiago Surrender Tree

The site of the Santiago Surrender Tree (also known as the Tree of Peace, Peace Tree or Spanish: Arbol de la Paz), located in Santiago, Cuba, marks the site where Spanish forces surrendered to U.S. forces on July 17, 1898, at the end of the Spanish–American War.

== Background ==
The site of the ceiba tree marks the site where Spanish forces surrendered to U.S. forces on July 17, 1898, at the end of the Spanish–American War. The tree had been the site of previous prisoner exchanges. On July 1, 1898, U.S. and Cuban troops had taken Fort El Viso, El Caney and San Juan Hill. These victories led to the U.S. victory at Santiago de Cuba.

== Current status ==
Per United States law, the site is to be maintained by the American Battle Monuments Commission since 1958. The tree is now gone, but cannon and plaques continue to mark the surrender site.

A brochure about the Santiago Surrender Tree

== See also ==
- Clara Barton
- Rough Riders
- Battle of Las Guasimas
