= Fort Bennett =

Coordinates: 44°40′18″N 100°38′26″W

- was located in Stanley County, South Dakota at the mouth of the Cheyenne River. The site lies under the waters of Oahe Reservoir.

Site information
- Controlled by: United States

Location
- Location within South Dakota

Site history
- Built: 1870
- In use: 1870-1891
- Battles/wars: Indian Wars: Great Sioux War of 1876-77

Garrison information
- Past commanders: Major Robert E.A. Crofton, 17th Infantry Captain Edward P. Pearson, 17th Infantry Capt. Carlisle Boyd, 17th Infantry Capt. John H. Donovan, 17th Infantry Lt. Col. George P. Buell, 11th Infantry Colonel William H. Wood, 11th Infantry Captain Charles A. Wikoff, Company E, 11th Infantry Captain William N. Sage, Company I, 11th Infantry Captain Joseph H. Hurst, Company A, 12th Infantry
- Garrison: 17th U.S. Infantry, Companies B and C 11th U.S. Infantry 12th U.S. Infantry, Companies A and K

Fort Bennett, originally called the Post at Cheyenne River Agency, was an army post established during the Indian wars in the Department of Dakota by the U.S. Army to control the Sioux.

== History ==
The Cheyenne River Agency was established in 1869, following conclusion of the Fort Laramie Treaty, as agency for the Two Kettle, Sans Arc and Miniconjou Sioux. On May 17, 1870, Companies B and C of the 17th U.S. Infantry, under command of Captain Edward P. Pearson, officially established the "Post at Cheyenne River Agency." It was built next to the agency 7 miles above Fort Sully to afford military protection.

Some of the Cheyenne River Indians fought in the Great Sioux War of 1876-77 and, after the surrender, were returned to the agency.

On December 30, 1878, the name was changed by General Orders No. 9, Division of the Missouri, to Fort Bennett in honor of Capt. Andrew S. Bennett of the 5th Infantry who was killed September 4, 1878, near Clark's Fork, Montana Territory, in a battle with the Bannock Indians.

Fort Bennett was also a focal point of trouble during the Ghost Dance uprising of 1890.

In 1891, the Great Sioux Reservation having been reduced and divided, after the ratification, of the treaty of 1889, the fort was abandoned and the Cheyenne River Agency was moved fifty-six miles up the Missouri River, opposite Forest City, Potter County, South Dakota, where administered the affairs of these Indians. As a result of the construction of Oahe Dam, the agency was later moved to Eagle Butte, South Dakota.

== Description ==
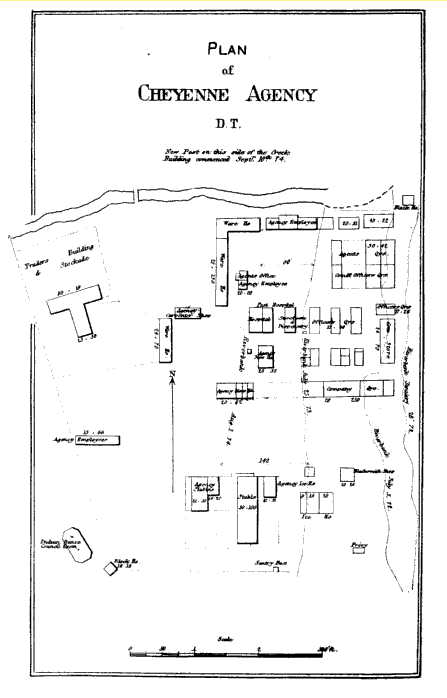
Plan of Fort Bennett

Fort Bennett was located on the Missouri river, 7 miles above Fort Sully, Dakota, 302 miles from Sioux City, Iowa, by wagon road, and about 500 miles by river. Yankton, Dakota, 237 miles distant by land and 315 by river. Nearest postoffice and telegraph at Fort Sully.

The military buildings consist of quarters for two companies, with necessary outbuildings, officers' quarters, hospital, guard house, block houses, two; storehouses, three, capacity inadequate; bake house, stable, workshops, laundress' quarters, etc. All the buildings are constructed of cottonwood logs, with the exception of a frame storehouse.

Quartermaster's and subsistence stores furnished from the depots at Sioux City, Iowa; Yankton, Dakota; Chicago, Ill., and Jeffersonville, Ind., by rail to Sioux City, thence by Missouri river. Hay contracted for in the vicinity. Wood supplied by contract. Water supplied from the Missouri river by means of wagons. Twelve months' subsistence kept on hand.

The Indians at this agency were the Minneconjou, Sans Arc and Two Kettle tribes of Sioux. About 1,500 were at the agency and its vicinity, and not more than this number are considered permanent residents. The number present has varied from 1,500 to 7,000, the latter number being at the agency during part of 1869 and 1870. The majority of the Indians belonging here are constantly coming and going and associate with roving hostile bands. The disposition of the Indians at the agency who receive rations all the year round, or nearly so, is good, with the exception of the young men, who are not reliable.

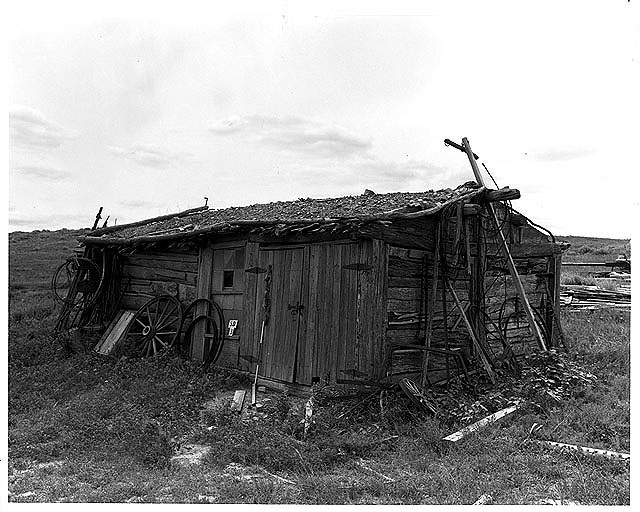
Old Blacksmith Shop, Fort Bennett, Pierre vicinity, South Dakota

== See also ==
Department of Dakota Forts
