= John Henry Parker (general) =

United States Army general (1866–1942)

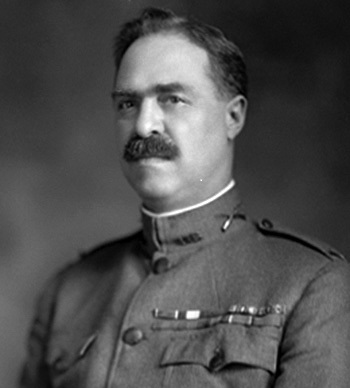
- Col. John Henry Parker, U.S. Army, circa 1917
- Born: September 19, 1866; Tipton, Missouri
- Died: October 14, 1942 (aged 76); Reno, Nevada
- Burial place: San Francisco National Cemetery
- Military career
- Allegiance: United States of America
- Branch: United States Army
- Service years: 1892–1924
- Rank: Brigadier General
- Nickname: "Gatling Gun Parker"
- Commands: 102nd Infantry Regiment
- Conflicts: Spanish–American War; Pancho Villa Expedition; World War I
- Awards: Distinguished Service Cross (4); Distinguished Service Medal; Silver Star; Purple Heart

John Henry Parker aka "Gatling Gun Parker" (September 19, 1866 – October 14, 1942) was a brigadier general in the United States Army. He is best known for his role as the commander of the Gatling Gun Detachment of the U.S. Army's Fifth Army Corps in Cuba during the Santiago campaign in the Spanish–American War.

== Early career ==
John Henry Parker was born and raised in the small town of Sedalia, Missouri. Nominated by his congressman to attend the United States Military Academy at West Point, he graduated in 1892, and was assigned in June of that year as a 2nd Lieutenant to the 13th Infantry Regiment.

Known as "Blackie" to his fellow officers, Parker was tasked with the charge of training soldiers of the Machine Gun Detachment in the use of their weapons. In the 1890s, duty with the machine gun detachment was regarded as of little value by most Army officers, and the detachment was frequently used as a dumping ground for men deemed unsuitable or undisciplined by their commanders. Nevertheless, Parker successfully carried out his assignment, and was promoted to 1st Lieutenant on June 11, 1892.

At the time, all of the Army's artillery and ammunition supplies were typically transported by draft animals such as horses or mules. It was becoming evident to many army commanders, both in the United States and abroad, that draft animals—the sole source of transport away from railroad tracks—were highly vulnerable to modern artillery fire at ranges under 1,500 yards, especially when contained in slow-moving trains of horse-drawn carriages and heavy wagons. The inability of army ground forces to bring gunnery and ammunition trains closer than 1,500 yards to an opponent with modern artillery support effectively prevented the short-ranged American black powder cannon of the day from providing any effective counterbattery fire to advancing infantry. In 1897, after considering the issue, Lt. Parker submitted a paper to the Army General Staff in which he advocated the use of highly mobile machine gun detachments. These machine gun detachments would be equipped with portable machine guns capable of being dismantled and transported to the front, together with sufficient supplies of ammunition and spare parts carried in highly mobile carriages and wagons. Parker visualized the detachments as independent from the slow-moving artillery and ammunition trains, constantly redeploying to avoid being targeted by enemy artillery, while using terrain masking to provide cover for the men and their transport animals. As self-contained, mobile units, the machine gun detachments could be used by a commander to provide effective covering fire for the artillery trains until they could get within effective range of the enemy lines. Unfortunately, Parker's treatise was ignored by the Army, though he continued to advocate the use of the machine gun in an offensive role.

In September 1897 Parker was assigned to the Infantry and Cavalry School as a student officer, where he graduated in April 1898. That same month he was assigned to the 25th Infantry Regiment in Tampa, Florida, where it was fitting out for an amphibious assault on Cuba.

== Spanish–American War ==
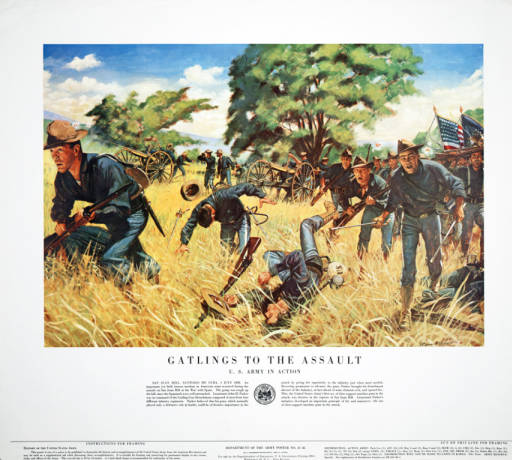
Poster depicting soldiers fighting in a field while guns from Parker's detachment fire in the background

After the outbreak of war with Spain, Lt. Parker approached General William Rufus Shafter, commander of the U.S. expeditionary campaign being readied in Tampa, Florida, for the assault on Santiago, Cuba, and requested permission to form a Gatling Gun Detachment. After Parker presented a detailed operational plan for the composition and employment of the Gatling Guns, Shafter approved the request, apparently impressed by the lieutenant's enthusiasm and attention to detail. On May 27, Parker was given four of a consignment of fifteen brand-new ten-barrel Model 1895 Gatling guns in .30 Army caliber recently received from Colt's Arms Company. In order to save time, Parker also received permission from General Shafter to utilize men from the infantry regiments already in Tampa and assigned to the invasion. However, the men themselves were "volunteers" selected by their existing company commanders, many of whom believed the assignment to be a temporary work detail (one commander even sent the cook from his private mess).

On his own initiative, Parker developed his own table of organization to include gun carriages, crew schedules, ammunition loads, and draft animal requirements. He then commenced training drills for the crews, using his own theory of mobile machine gun tactics to structure the new unit. Parker's men responded enthusiastically to the challenge of learning to operate, maintain, and fire the new guns.

When it became apparent that space aboard the transports of the invasion force would be limited, Parker had the Gatling Gun detachment assigned to guard ammunition being taken aboard the transport Cherokee. Under this pretext he was able to get his men, guns, wagons, and equipment aboard ship, though the Detachment still had not been supplied with any horses for pulling the guns.

While aboard the transport Cherokee, Parker's Detachment was assigned the task of anti-torpedo boat duty by the ship's captain, and the men were forced to manhandle one of the guns from the stifling hold up to the deck to accomplish this task. Parker's battery, consisting of four guns, carriages, and some 30,000 rounds of .30 Army ammunition, was given priority for disembarkation at Daiquirí, Cuba by General Shafter. When General Samuel Sumner ordered Parker and his men to remain aboard and wait their turn (on the grounds that Parker, a mere lieutenant, lacked authority to enforce his priority), Parker sent word to the expedition commander, General Shafter, who personally arrived in a steam launch to ensure that the Gatling Gun Detachment was landed immediately. Upon landing at Daiquirí, Parker immediately arranged for the purchase of several mules from local sources to pull the guns.

After being officially mustered into service on June 30, 1898, the Gatling Gun Detachment was ordered to advance to El Pozo, the site of General Shafter's headquarters for the impending offensive. Parker's battery was initially ordered to provide covering fire for the artillery. One of the Gatlings was detached to the service of General Shafter's aide, Lt. Miley. After being ordered to send his guns forward "to the best point you can find", Parker set up his remaining three Gatlings near the base of the San Juan Heights to provide covering fire for the advancing U.S. ground forces.

During the assault on San Juan Heights, Lt. Parker and his men used three of their four Gatling guns to cover the American assaults on both San Juan Hill and Kettle Hill. Equipped with swivel mountings that enabled the gunners to rake Spanish positions, the three fast-firing guns, firing at a range of 600-800 yards, expended approximately 18,000 cal. .30 rounds in eight and one-half minutes (over 700 rounds per minute of continuous fire) into the Spanish defensive lines atop the heights, killing many of the defenders, forcing others to flee the trenchlines, while disrupting the aim of those still alive who continued to resist.

Col. Theodore Roosevelt later noted that the hammering sound of the Gatling guns raised the spirits of his men:

While thus firing, there suddenly smote on our ears a peculiar drumming sound. One or two of the men cried out, "The Spanish machine guns!" but, after listening a moment, I leaped to my feet and called, "It's the Gatlings, men! Our Gatlings!" Immediately the troopers began to cheer lustily, for the sound was most inspiring.

Trooper Jesse D. Langdon of the 1st Volunteer Infantry, who accompanied Col. Theodore Roosevelt and the Rough Riders in their assault on Kettle Hill, reported:

We were exposed to the Spanish fire, but there was very little because just before we started, why, the Gatling guns opened up at the bottom of the hill, and everybody yelled, "The Gatlings! The Gatlings!" and away we went. The Gatlings just enfiladed the top of those trenches. We'd never have been able to take Kettle Hill if it hadn't been for Parker's Gatling guns.

On San Juan Hill, Parker's battery of Gatling guns continued to rake the trenchlines until the American assault broke into a charge about 150 yards from the crest of the hill, when the guns ceased firing (via hand signal from Lt. Ferguson of the attacking 13th Infantry) to avoid causing friendly fire injuries. Upon gaining San Juan Hill, the carnage wrought by the Gatling fire was immediately noted by the officers and men who had led the charge into the Spanish trenches atop San Juan. Captain Boughton, among the first of the officers to surmount the crest of San Juan Hill during the infantry assault, stated the trenches on the hilltop were already filled with dead and dying Spanish riflemen, while the open ground behind the trenchline was covered with dead and dying Spanish defenders who had been shot while attempting to flee the hail of Gatling fire. Parker's employment of machine guns to support and cover infantry in the offense marked the first use by the U.S. Army of such weapons in that role.

After gaining the Spanish positions on the heights, the Americans prepared for a Spanish counterattack. Parker sited two of his Gatling guns near the crest of San Juan Hill. A major counterattack by some 600 Spanish infantry troops developed against the positions of the 1st Volunteer Cavalry and 3rd Cavalry on Kettle Hill. At a distance of 600 yards, Parker immediately ordered Sgt. Green's Gatling—the only gun within shouting distance—to open fire against the Spanish attacking the Americans on Kettle Hill. The effect of Sgt. Green's Gatling fire was immediate. According to the testimony of Spanish officers captured after the action, only 40 of the 600 Spanish troops survived. Parker then moved the two guns again to avoid counterbattery fire, where they were used at a range of 2,000 yards to kill and scatter the crew of a Spanish 160 mm (6.3-inch) artillery cannon. The contributions of Parker's Gatling Gun Detachment during the Santiago campaign were noted by Col. Roosevelt, who stated:

I think Parker deserved rather more credit than any other one man in the entire campaign ... he had the rare good judgment and foresight to see the possibilities of the machine-guns. ... He then, by his own exertions, got it to the front and proved that it could do invaluable work on the field of battle, as much in attack as in defence.

On July 2, 1898, Parker's guns were placed in reserve. On the 4th, Parker ordered the three operational Gatlings moved into the battle line. The wheels of the gun carriages were removed, and the Gatlings, along with two M1895 Colt–Browning machine guns (a gift from Col. Roosevelt) were placed in breastworks where they could command various sectors of fire. The fourth Gatling was repaired and placed in reserve behind the others. However, it was soon moved to Fort Canosa, where it was used to fire 6,000 to 7,000 rounds into the city of Santiago during the siege of that city, causing enemy casualties, disrupting communications, and demoralizing the defenders. After Parker's exploits became known by the press, he would forever after be referred to as "Gatling Gun" Parker.

== Later career ==
As an Army officer, Parker continued to expound his theories on the tactical employment of machine guns, particularly in the offense. He was a prolific writer, and contributed numerous articles and treatises to the Infantry Journal and other Army publications. Parker was promoted in rank to captain in 1900 and was transferred to the 28th Infantry Regiment. In January 1908 he was assigned the task of developing organizational schedules and training regulations for the U.S. Army's dismounted machine gun companies.

During World War I, Parker—by now a Colonel in the 102nd Infantry Regiment, 26th Division, A.E.F.—saw combat on numerous occasions, and was singled out numerous times by his superior officers for his efficiency and bravery in the field. As an instructor at the Army Machine-Gun School at Langres, France, Parker instructed AEF troops in the use of the machine gun, for which he received the Distinguished Service Medal. From January–November 1918 Parker received the Silver Star Citation and the Distinguished Service Cross four times for valor displayed on four separate occasions (his final DSC Citation was a Third Bronze Oak Leaf in lieu of a Fourth Award of the DSC). (Note - during and shortly after World War I, bronze oak leaves, rather than oak leaf clusters, were awarded to represent additional awards of decorations.) His fourth DSC citation states that he was receiving the award for extraordinary heroism in action:

During the attack on the village of Gesnes Colonel Parker displayed great gallantry and fearlessness in leading and directing his front line with utter disregard for personal safety and urged his men forward by his personal example, all under heavy machine-gun, high-explosive, gas-shell, and shrapnel fire. He was abreast of his front line until he fell, twice wounded, but thereafter remained in active command for a period of five hours, when he was relieved by the lieutenant colonel of his regiment.

Parker remained in the Army after the Armistice. He was assigned to St. Louis, Missouri, on General Recruiting Service from August 15, 1919, to March 15, 1921. He reverted to his permanent rank of lieutenant colonel on March 31, 1920, and was promoted to colonel of Infantry on July 1, 1920.

Parker commanded Jefferson Barracks, Missouri, from March 15 to November 15, 1921, served at St. Louis as Chief of Staff, 7th Corps, Organized Reserves from January 15 to December 15, 1922. He then served at Kansas City, Missouri, on recruiting duty until August 1, 1923, and finally Corps Area Recruiting Officer until February 29, 1924, when he retired from the Army.

Parker was promoted to the rank of Brigadier General on the Retired List by an act of Congress on June 13, 1940.

== Death ==
General Parker died on October 13, 1942, at Reno, Nevada, and was interred at Section OS, Row 36, Site 8 at the Presidio in San Francisco, California, the final resting place of his former commander, General Rufus Shafter.

== Memberships ==
General Parker was admitted to the Missouri Bar in February 1906. He was a member of the National Geographical Society, Military Order of Foreign Wars, Sons of Veterans, and was a 32d Degree Freemason.

== Awards ==
Distinguished Service Cross with three bronze oak leaves
Distinguished Service Medal
Silver Star
Purple Heart with two oak leaf clusters
Spanish Campaign Medal
Army of Cuban Occupation Medal
Philippine Campaign Medal
Cuban Pacification Medal
Mexican Border Service Medal
Victory Medal
Commander of the Order of the Black Star (Dahomey)
Officer of the Legion of Honor (France)
Croix de Guerre with Palm (France)

- Gold Medal, Military Service Institute (1911)

=== Award citations ===
==== Distinguished Service Cross ====
For extraordinary heroism in action at Seicheprey, France, April 20, 1918. During the engagement at Seicheprey, he went out in a withering hostile barrage to inspect his lines. Repeatedly he climbed upon the firing step of the trench, and, standing there with his back toward the enemy and with shell splinters falling about him, he talked to his men in such cool, calm terms as to reassure them and brace them up so that when he left they were in a cheerful state of mind and in better condition to ward against attack.

1st Bronze Oak Leaf:

On July 21, 1918, near Trugny, France, he made a personal reconnaissance over a front of about 2 kilometers on horseback in the face of enemy fire and determined the strength of the German forces to insure the most advantageous approach for his troops to attack. Several times he was an inspiring figure to his men under a heavy artillery barrage and concentration of machine‑gun fire.

2nd Bronze Oak Leaf:

On July 25, 1918, on the road through La Fere Wood, between Beuvardes and Le Charmel, France, a battalion just coming into the line was halted, awaiting orders. Subjected suddenly to an intense artillery concentration, the men, who had only such cover as was afforded by the shallow ditches along the road, were thrown into some confusion. At that moment Col. Parker came down the road on horseback. Immediately appreciating the situation, he twice rode down the line and back again at a slow walk, stopping to talk with the men; and thus by his fearless personal exposure to, and disregard of, danger, he promptly steadied the troops and prevented probable disorder at an important juncture.

3rd Bronze Oak Leaf:

For extraordinary heroism in action near Gesnes, France, Sept. 29, 1918. During the attack on the village of Gesnes he displayed great gallantry and fearlessness in leading and directing his front line with utter disregard for personal safety and urged his men forward by his personal example, all under heavy machine‑gun, high‑explosive gas‑shell and shrapnel fire. He was abreast of his front line until he fell, twice wounded, but thereafter remained in active command for a period of five hours, when he was relieved by the lieutenant-colonel of his regiment.

==== Distinguished Service Medal ====
For exceptionally meritorious and distinguished services. As an instructor in the Army Machine Gun School at Langres, by his tireless efforts he secured the necessary equipment and ably instructed a large student body in the technical handling of one of the most important fire power weapons developed in the present war, rendering services of great value to the American Expeditionary Forces.

==== Silver Star ====
For gallantry in action against Spanish forces at the battle of Santiago, Cuba, July 1, 1898.

==== Citation in orders of the 26th Division ====
For having shown marked gallantry and meritorious service in the capture of Torcy, Belleau, Givry, Bouresches Woods, Rochet Woods, Hill 190 overlooking Château Thierry, Etrepilly, Bezuet, Epieds, Trugny, and La Fere Woods to the Jaulgonne–Fère-en‑Tardenois Road during advance of this Division against the enemy from July 18 to 25, 1918, in the Second Battle of the Marne.

==== Croix de Guerre ====
An Officer of extraordinary courage; inspiring have regiment by the example of his bravery and coolness under the most concentrated fire. On July 25, 1918, when a battalion waiting for orders was suddenly exposed to extremely concentrated fire and began to break up, he rode through the battalion several times, speaking to the men and encouraging them by his example of calm bravery.

== Dates of rank ==
- Cadet, USMA - June 16, 1888
- 2nd Lieutenant, Regular Army - June 11, 1892
- 1st Lieutenant, Regular Army - April 26, 1898 (backdated; he was promoted in December)
- Major, U.S. Volunteers - August 17, 1899
- Mustered out of volunteers - May 16, 1901
- Captain, Regular Army - February 2, 1902
- Major, Regular Army - November 21, 1914
- Lieutenant Colonel, Regular Army - May 15, 1917
- Colonel, National Army - August 5, 1917
- Reverted to permanent rank of Lieutenant Colonel - March 31, 1920
- Colonel, Regular Army - July 1, 1920
- Colonel, Retired List - February 29, 1924
- Brigadier General, Retired List - June 13, 1940

== Authored works ==
- Parker, John H. (Lt.) (2006) [1898], The Gatlings At Santiago, Middlesex, U.K.: Echo Library, ISBN 9781847023933, preface by Theodore Roosevelt. Reprint of History of the Gatling Gun Detachment Fifth Army Corps, at Santiago, with a Few Unvarnished Truths Concerning that Expedition.
- Parker, John H. (Lt.) (1898), History of the Gatling Gun Detachment Fifth Army Corps, at Santiago, with a Few Unvarnished Truths Concerning that Expedition, Kansas City, MO: Hudson-Kimberly Publishing Co.
- Parker, John H. (Lt.) (1899), Tactical Organization and Uses of Machine Guns in the Field, Kansas City, MO: Hudson-Kimberly Publishing Co.
- Parker, John H. (Capt.) (July 1908), "Progress In Machine Gun Development, 9 April 1908", Journal of the United States Infantry Association, 5: 3–13

== See also ==
- M2 Browning#History regarding Parker's involvement in large caliber machine guns
