= Battle of San Juan Hill =

Significant battle of the Spanish–American War

- Part of the Spanish–American War
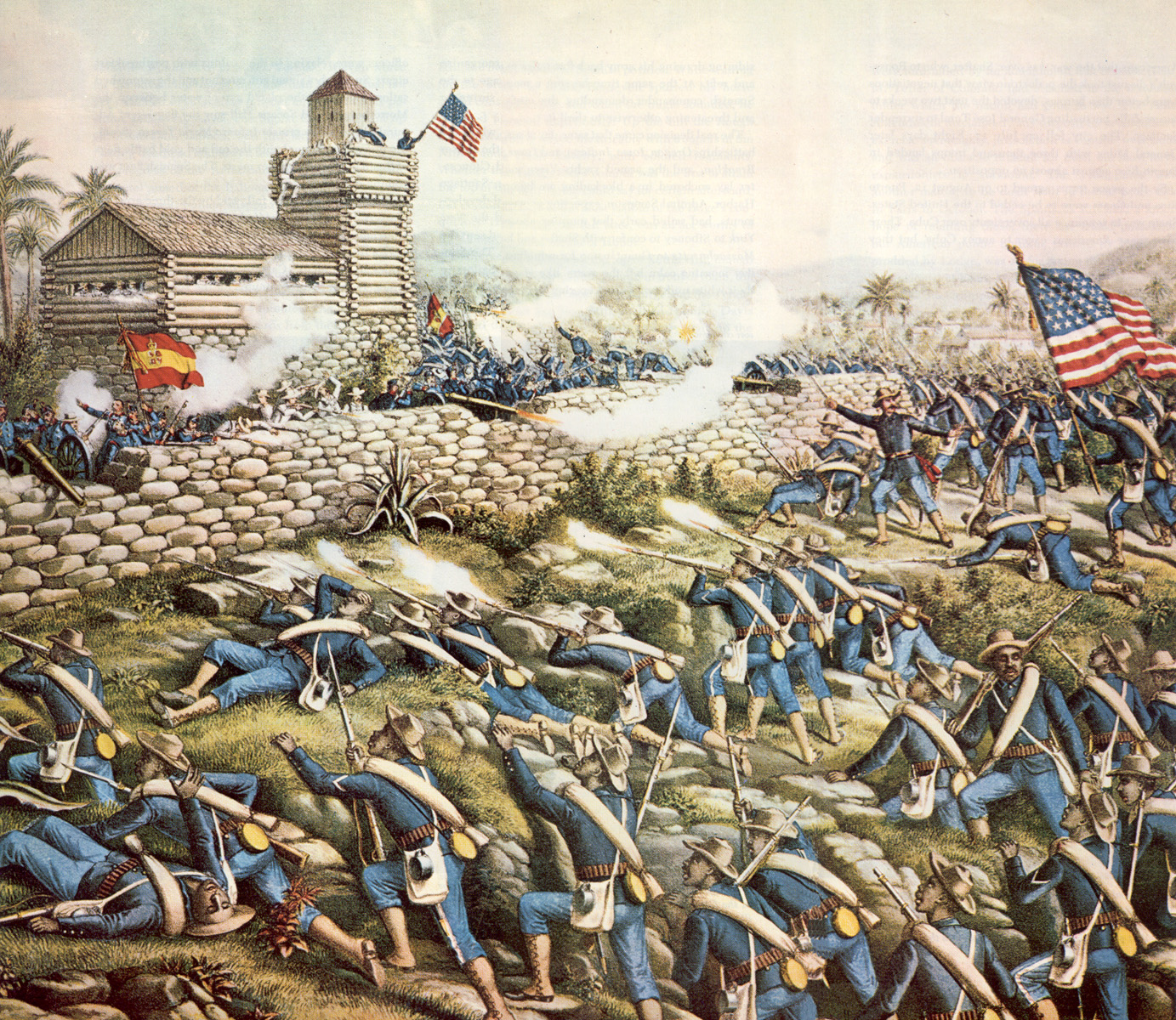
- Charge of the 24th and 25th Colored Infantry
Date	July 1, 1898; 128 years ago
Location	San Juan Hill, Santiago de Cuba, Cuba 20°01′15″N 75°47′58″W
Result	American victory

Belligerents
United States	Spain

Commanders and leaders
(United States) William Shafter; (United States) Joseph Wheeler	Arsenio Linares y Pombo

Strength
8,412; 4 gatling guns	521

Casualties and losses
144 killed 1,024 wounded 72 missing	58 killed 366 wounded 41 captured

The Battle of San Juan Hill (Spanish: Batalla de las Colinas de San Juan), also known as the Battle for the San Juan Heights, was a major battle of the Spanish–American War fought July 1, 1898, between an American force under the command of William Rufus Shafter and Joseph Wheeler against a Spanish force led by Arsenio Linares y Pombo. The combined assaults on Kettle Hill and San Juan Hill that together form San Juan Heights proved to be one of the most significant battles of the war and, along with the Siege of Santiago, a decisive battle in deciding the fate of the United States Army campaign in Cuba. The American forces, outnumbering the Spanish defenders 16-to-one, charged upon the heights and dispersed the Spanish after suffering heavy casualties.

Tensions between Spain and the United States worsened over Spanish behavior during their efforts to quell the Cuban War of Independence, with many Americans being agitated by exaggerated reports of Spanish atrocities against the Cuban population. In January 1898, fearing the fate of American interests in Cuba due to the war, the cruiser USS Maine was dispatched to protect them. Less than a month later, the cruiser exploded while lying at anchor in Havana harbor, killing 267 sailors onboard and inflaming American opinion, with Spain being portrayed as the culprit in the American media without conclusive evidence. Two months later, war was declared.

The Americans, after already landing troops in the Battle of Guantánamo Bay, moved inland to seek a decisive encounter with the Spanish forces. Both sides drew blood at the Battle of Las Guasimas, with the Spanish moving to defend the strategically valuable San Juan Heights from the Americans. A week later, a significantly larger American force, including the famed "Rough Riders", moved to clear the heights of the Spanish. After enduring artillery fire which inflicted heavy casualties, the Americans charged up the hill and dispersed the Spanish, suffering even more heavily in the process. The fight for the heights proved to be the bloodiest and most famous battle of the war.

The battle also proved to be the location of the "greatest victory" for the Rough Riders, as stated by the press and its new commander, Theodore Roosevelt. Roosevelt returned to New York and was promptly elected governor. He was posthumously awarded the Medal of Honor in 2001 for his actions in Cuba and became the only U.S. president to receive the award.

The Americans won another engagement at El Caney the same day, with both battles highlighting the bravery and skill of the American/Cuban forces, as well as the Spanish defenders. Following the surrender of the Spanish army at Santiago, they agreed to depart Cuba, ending over four centuries of Spanish rule.

== Background ==
Spanish General Arsenio Linares ordered 760 Spanish Army regular troops to hold the San Juan heights against an American offensive on July 1, 1898. For unclear reasons, Linares failed to reinforce this position, choosing to hold nearly 10,000 Spanish reserves in the city of Santiago de Cuba.

Spanish hilltop entrenchments, while typically well-concealed, were not all correctly positioned for plunging fire, which made return fire at the advancing Americans more difficult. Most of the Spanish fortifications and trench lines were laid out along the geographic crest of the heights instead of the military crest. This meant that the fire from the Spanish troops would have difficulty hitting the advancing enemy when the attacking Americans reached the defilade at the foot of the heights. Once they began scaling the hill, however, the attackers would be in full view of the defenders, who could engage the Americans with both rifle and artillery fire.

Most Spanish troops were recently arrived conscripts, but their officers were skilled in fighting Cuban insurgents. The Spanish were well equipped with supporting artillery, and all Spanish soldiers were armed with 7 mm Mauser M1893 rifles, a modern repeating bolt-action weapon with a high rate of fire that was chambered in the high-velocity smokeless powder 7mm Mauser cartridge. This rifle was faster to reload than the American Krag. Spanish artillery units were armed mainly with modern rapid-fire breech-loading cannon, again using smokeless powder.

The American regular forces and troopers were armed with bolt-action Krag rifles chambered in the smokeless .30 Army caliber. However the soldiers of the 24th and 25th Colored Infantry (Buffalo Soldiers) still used the single shot Springfield Model 1873 (Trapdoor) which fired the .45-70 black powder cartridge. While the Rough Rider's troopers carried the Krag, each Rough Rider officer was equipped with a .30 Army caliber M1895 Winchester lever-action rifle, courtesy of Col. Roosevelt. However, U.S. 3.2-inch artillery pieces were of an outmoded design, with a slow rate of fire due to bag powder charges and lack of a recoil mechanism. They also used less powerful black powder charges, which limited the effective range of support fire for U.S. troops. The Americans also had a four-gun Gatling Gun Detachment commanded by Lt. John Henry Parker. Parker's men were equipped with four Colt Model 1895 Gatlings in .30 Army caliber. Although these guns were hand-cranked, they were nevertheless capable of 700 rpm or more in continuous fire, and were equipped with swivel mounts to allow greater field of fire coverage.

General William Rufus Shafter commanded Fifth Army Corps, of about 15,000 troops in three divisions. Jacob F. Kent commanded the corps' 1st Division (brigade and division numbers in this era were only unique within their parent formation), while Henry W. Lawton commanded the 2nd Division. Joseph Wheeler commanded the dismounted Cavalry Division but was suffering from fever and had to turn over command to General Samuel S. Sumner. Shafter's plans to attack Santiago de Cuba called for Lawton's division to move north and reduce the Spanish stronghold at El Caney, a task which was to take about two hours. Then they were to join with the rest of the troops for the attack on the San Juan Heights. The remaining two divisions would move directly against the San Juan heights, with Sumner in the center and Kent to the south. Shafter, too ill to personally direct the operations, set up his headquarters at El Pozo 2 mi (3.2 km) from the heights and communicated via mounted staff officers.

== Order of battle ==
=== U.S. ===
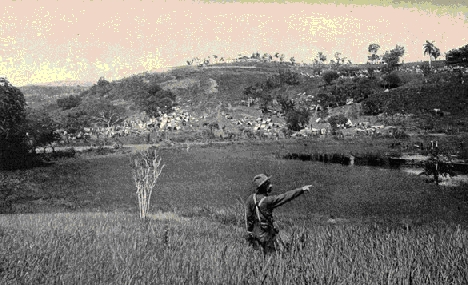
U. S. Army photo of a soldier pointing at the top of Kettle Hill, c. July 4, 1898. In the background are the block houses on San Juan Hill and the American encampment.

Fifth Army Corps – Major General William Rufus Shafter, Corps Executive Officer – Major General Joseph Wheeler (Cavalry Division)

- 1st Division – Brigadier General Jacob Ford Kent
  - 1st Brigade – Brigadier General Hamilton S. Hawkins; consisted of the 6th and 16th Infantry Regiments, along with the 71st (New York Volunteer) Infantry Regiment
  - 2nd Brigade – Colonel Edward P. Pearson; consisting of the 2nd, 10th, and 21st U.S. Infantry Regiments
  - 3rd Brigade – Colonel Charles A. Wikoff; consisting of the 9th, 13th and 24th (Colored) U.S. Infantry regiments
- Cavalry Division (Dismounted) – Major General Joseph Wheeler; Division Executive Officer Samuel S. Sumner (1st Brigade) was in command of the division when the battle began as General Wheeler was ill. Wheeler returned to the front once the battle was underway.
  - 1st Brigade – Brigadier General Samuel S. Sumner, Brigade Executive Officer Lieutenant Colonel Henry Carroll (6th Cav); consisted of the 3rd U.S. Cavalry, 6th U.S. Cavalry and 9th U.S. Cavalry
  - 2nd Brigade – Colonel Leonard Wood; consisted of the 1st U.S. Cavalry, 10th U.S. Cavalry and 1st Volunteer Cavalry

The American assault line consisted of the following regiments: From the far left, attacking what later became known as San Juan Hill, was the 6th Infantry, the 9th Infantry, the 13th Infantry, the 16th Infantry, the 24th (Colored) Infantry, the 10th (Colored) Cavalry (the 10th was the only unit that assaulted both high points on the San Juan heights), with the 3rd Cavalry, 1st Volunteer Cavalry on the far right, attacking what later became known as Kettle Hill.

== The Battle ==
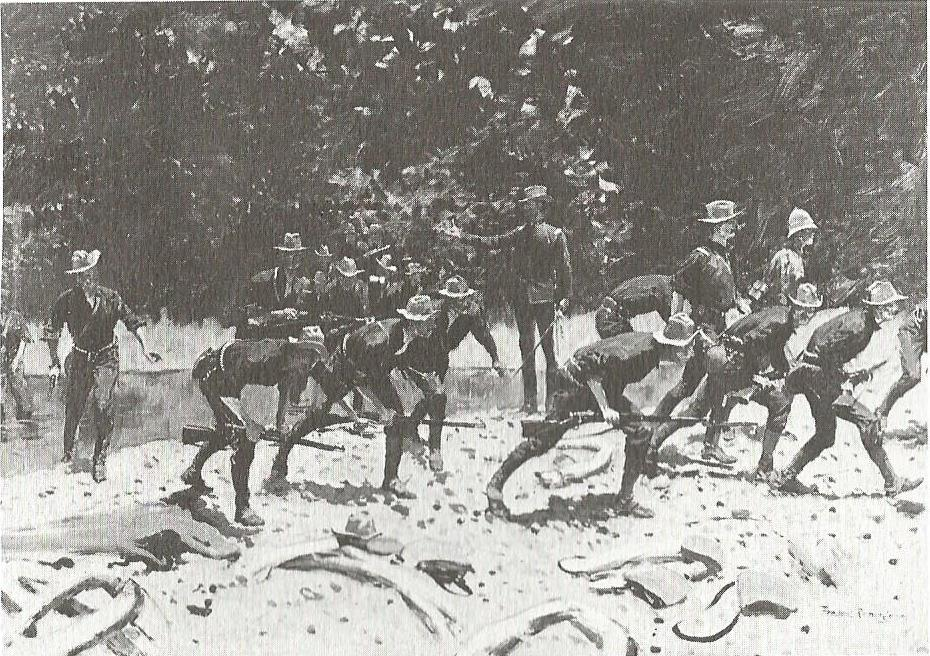
At the Bloody Ford of the San Juan by Frederic Remington, 1898

=== Initial troops cross the San Juan River and are pinned down ===
A company from the Signal Corps ascended in a hot air balloon to reconnoiter the hills. The balloon made a good target for the Spaniards. Hawkins' brigade had already passed by the newfound route and Kent ordered forward the brigade under Colonel Charles A. Wikoff. Wikoff began heading down the trail at noon, and 30 minutes later he emerged from the woods and was struck by a Mauser bullet. He died as his staff officers carried him to the rear. Lt. Col. William S. Worth, next in rank, assumed command, but within five minutes fell wounded. Lt. Col. Emerson Liscom assumed command and within another five minutes received a disabling wound. Lt. Col. Ezra P. Ewers, fourth in command of the brigade, assumed command. Kent and Sumner lined up for the attack and waited for Lawton's division to arrive from El Caney. Lawton did not arrive as scheduled, and no orders came from either Shafter or Wheeler. Crossing the San Juan River, increasing numbers of troops waited at the base of San Juan Hill. Waiting for orders, they were plagued by constant Spanish Mauser gunfire firing down at them from San Juan Heights. The troops would call their precarious position, "Hell's Pocket" and "Bloody Ford".

==== The Attack on San Juan Hill ====
As men waited at the base of the hill, General Hamilton Hawkins' 1st Infantry Brigade was preparing to assault San Juan Hill, the higher of the two hilltops forming San Juan Heights. The southernmost point was most recognizable for the Spanish blockhouse, a defensive fort that dominated the crest. The Cavalry Brigade then moved into position. Continuing to wait for orders from General Shafter, the Americans suffered casualties from rifle and artillery fire. As the volume of fire increased, officers began to agitate for action.

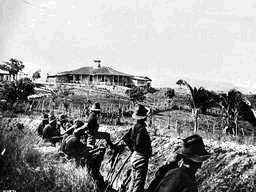
US Army photo showing trench and block house on San Juan Hill about July 4, 1898. Soldiers are from the 10th U.S. Cavalry Regiment.

The 2nd and 10th Infantry regiments of the 2nd Brigade were ordered by the brigade commander, Col. E. P. Pearson, to advance towards the Spanish lines. Positioned on the far left of the American line, the two regiments moved forward in good order, advanced towards a small knoll on the Spanish right flank, and drove groups of Spanish skirmishers back towards their trenches. A former brigade staff officer, First Lieutenant Jules Garesche Ord (son of General E. O. C. Ord), officially of the 6th Infantry Regiment but temporarily assigned to D Company of the 10th due to sick and heat-disabled officers in the Fifth Corps, made a special request to General Hawkins. "General, if you will order a charge, I will lead it." Hawkins responded, "I will not ask for volunteers, I will not give permission and I will not refuse it," he said. "God bless you and good luck!" Lt. Ord then asked the leaders to the right of the 10th Cavalry (members of the 3rd and 1st Volunteers) to "support the regulars" when they charged the heights. When Ord returned to his assigned unit, he advised his commander, Captain John Bigelow Jr. of D Troop, of his conversation with the general. Bigelow gave the honor to sound the advance to Lt. Ord. With a sword in one hand and a pistol in the other, Ord stood up and ordered the advance of his unit. The Buffalo Soldiers (members of the 10th Cavalry Regiment) moved out of the trenches and up the hill. Units to the right began moving forward in a ripple effect to support the regulars. To the left of the 10th, a cheer went out from members of the 24th all-black Infantry Regiment, and they too moved toward the top of the heights. They were accompanied by elements of the 6th Infantry Regiment, including E Company, led by Capt. L. W. V. Kennon, as well as units from the 9th and 13th Infantry Regiments. The 16th Infantry followed some distance behind the lead formations, while the 71st (New York Volunteer) infantry regiment, having failed to initially advance with the other regiments, remained at the rear. As the units began their advance up the hill, they became separated, with the battalions of some regiments placed between those of other regiments.

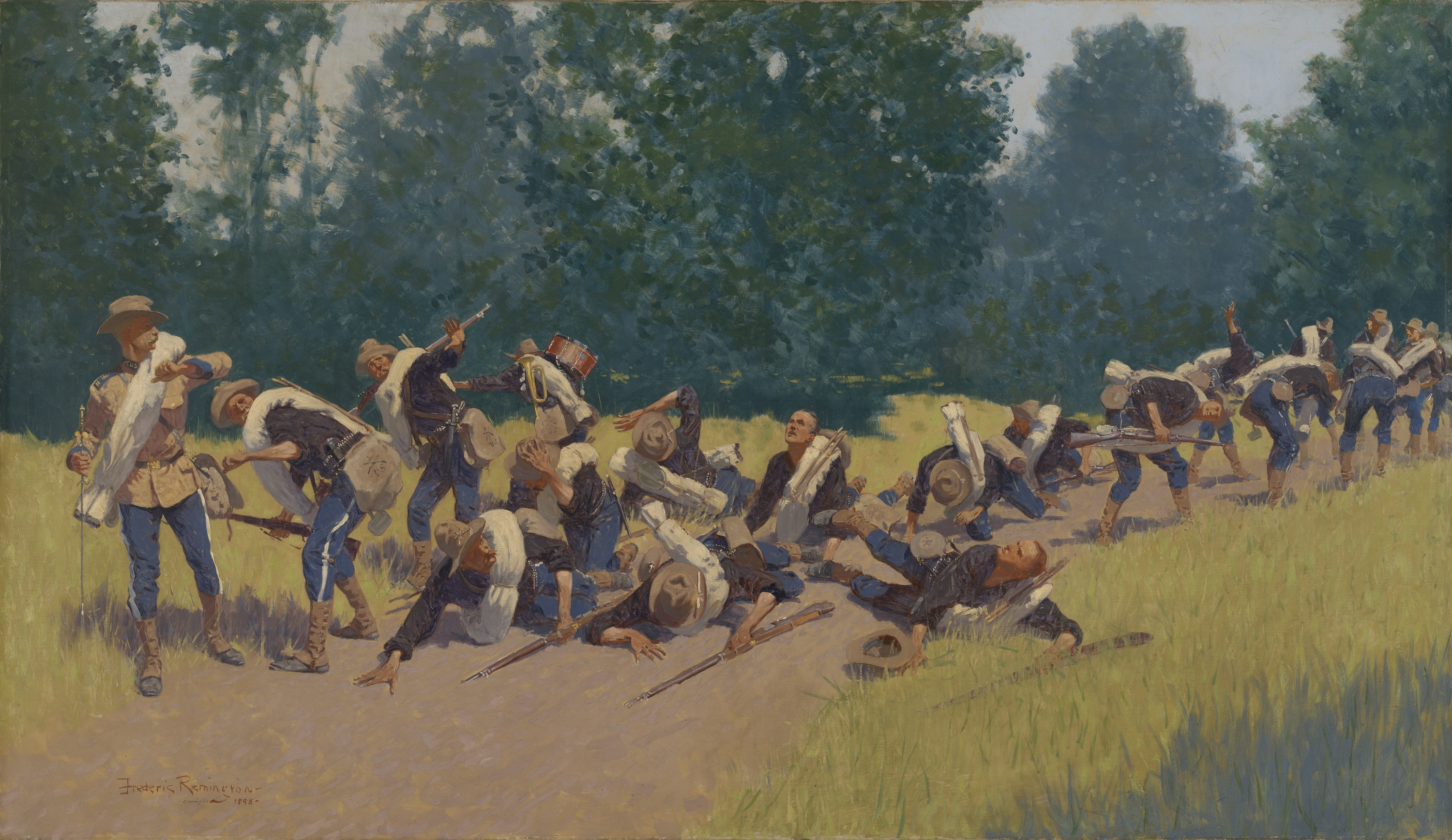
The Scream of Shrapnel at San Juan Hill, by Frederic Remington, 1898

The Fifth Corps' newly formed Gatling Gun Detachment participated in the U.S. Army's first use of machine gun fire for mobile fire support in offensive combat. Because U.S. black-powder artillery pieces lacked the range to reach the Spanish positions, Lt. John Parker's Gatling battery of four .30 caliber 10-barrelled guns was originally conceived as providing covering fire for the artillery trains. The Gatling Gun Detachment was ordered to move forward in support of the U.S. assault, and Lt. Parker received orders from his colonel to detach one gun to General Shafter's aide, Lt. John D. Miley, then to take the remaining three guns forward "to the best point you can find". Parker set up his three Gatlings approximately 600 yd (550 m) from the San Juan Hill blockhouse and its surrounding trenches, occupied by Spanish regulars; 800 yd (730 m) away was another ridge-line, also with Spanish entrenchments. Being exposed, the Detachment soon came under attack and quickly lost five men to wounds and others to severe heat stroke. Ordinarily, four to six men were required to operate each Gatling gun. Nevertheless, the crews continued to fire at the Spanish. Lt. Parker's three rapid-fire Gatlings provided covering fire for U.S. forces assaulting both hills. Equipped with swivel mountings that enabled the gunners to rake Spanish positions, the three guns poured a continuous and demoralizing hail of bullets into the Spanish defensive lines. Witnessing the assault on San Juan Hill, more than one observer from the U.S. side noticed some of the Spanish defenders fleeing their trenches to escape the intense fire. The Gatlings continued to fire until Lt. Parker observed Lt. Ferguson of the 13th Infantry waving a white handkerchief as a signal for the battery to cease firing to avoid causing friendly casualties. The American assault then broke into a charge about 150 yd (140 m) from the crest of the hill.

Major William Auman was the first commanding officer to reach the top of the hill. Lt. Ord was among the first to reach the crest of San Juan heights. As the Spanish fled, Lt. Ord directed supporting fire into the remaining Spanish until he was mortally wounded by a shot to the throat. General Hawkins was wounded shortly after. At 13:50, Private Arthur Agnew of the 13th Infantry pulled down the Spanish flag atop the San Juan blockhouse. General Wood sent requests for General Kent to send up infantry to strengthen his vulnerable position. When General Wheeler reached the trenches, he ordered breastworks constructed. The Americans' position on San Juan was exposed to artillery fire from within Santiago, and General Shafter feared the American position on Kettle Hill was vulnerable to counter-attack by Spanish forces. A Spanish counter-attack was launched late in the afternoon, but was easily beaten back with the aid of supporting Gatling fire from San Juan Hill. Though General Wheeler assured Shafter that the position could be held, Shafter nevertheless ordered a withdrawal. Before the men on Kettle Hill could withdraw, General Wheeler called aside Generals Kent and Sumner and reassured them that the line could be held. During the night, the Americans worked at strengthening the lines while awaiting reinforcements.

==== The Attack on Kettle Hill ====
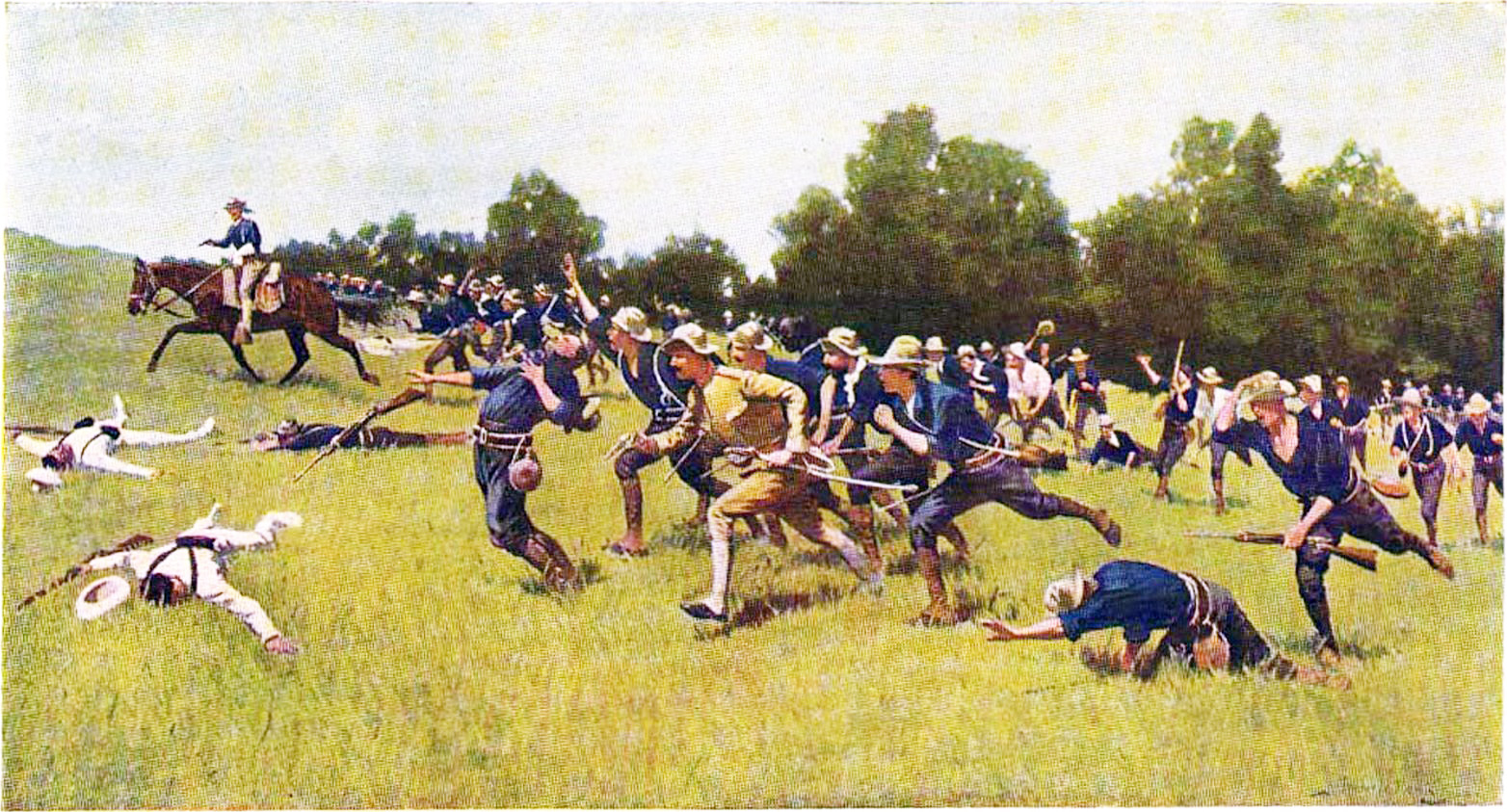
Charge of the Rough Riders at San Juan Hill by Frederic Remington. In reality, they first assaulted Kettle Hill and then San Juan Hill. With Theodore Roosevelt on horseback, Woodbury Kane carries a saber and pistol.

The 1st U.S. Volunteer Cavalry (Rough Riders), along with the 3rd Cavalry Regiment, began a near simultaneous assault supporting the regulars of the 10th Cavalry (Buffalo Soldiers) up Kettle Hill, supported by the fire of three Gatling guns commanded by Lt. John H. Parker. Trooper Jesse D. Langdon of the 1st Volunteer Infantry, who accompanied Col. Theodore Roosevelt and the Rough Riders in their assault on Kettle Hill, reported:

We were exposed to the Spanish fire, but there was very little because just before we started, why, the Gatling guns opened up at the bottom of the hill, and everybody yelled, “The Gatlings! The Gatlings!” and away we went. The Gatlings just enfiladed the top of those trenches. We’d never have been able to take Kettle Hill if it hadn’t been for Parker’s Gatling guns.

During the battle, Parker's Gatling guns expended approximately 18,000 rounds in eight and a half minutes (over 700 rounds per minute of continuous fire) into the Spanish defensive lines atop the heights, killing many of the defenders and forcing others to flee the trench lines, while disrupting the aim of any still alive who continued to resist. Col. Egbert, commander of the 6th Infantry assaulting San Juan Hill, stated that his regiment was brought to a halt near the top of the hill to await the cease-fire order, as the Gatling fire striking the crest and trench line was so intense. Col. Theodore Roosevelt later gave much of the credit for the successful capture of the Spanish positions atop the heights to Parker's inventive use of his Gatling Gun Detachment: "I think Parker deserved rather more credit than any other one man in the entire campaign ... he had the rare good judgment and foresight to see the possibilities of the machine-guns. He then, by his own exertions, got it to the front and proved that it could do invaluable work on the field of battle, as much in attack as in defense." Roosevelt observed that the hammering sound of the guns raised the spirits of his men: "While thus firing, there suddenly smote on our ears a peculiar drumming sound. One or two of the men cried out, 'The Spanish machine guns!' but, after listening a moment, I leaped to my feet and called, 'It's the Gatlings, men! Our Gatlings!' Immediately the troopers began to cheer lustily, for the sound was most inspiring."

Under continuous fire, the advance slowed as troops dropped from heat exhaustion. Officers from the rest of Wood's brigade, along with Carroll's, bunched up under fire. When the regulars of the all-black Buffalo Soldiers punched toward the top of the hill, the units became intermingled. One of the 10th's officers who took part in the attack, 1st Lieutenant John J. "Black Jack" Pershing, would later reach the highest rank ever held in the United States Army by a living officer – General of the Armies of the United States. Pershing later recalled that:

...the entire command moved forward as coolly as though the buzzing of bullets was the humming of bees. White regiments, black regiments, regulars and Rough Riders [i.e. volunteers], representing the young manhood of the North and the South, fought shoulder to shoulder, unmindful of race or color, unmindful of whether commanded by ex-Confederate or not, and mindful of only their common duty as Americans.

When the American formations (10th, 3rd, and 1st Volunteers) reached the summit of Kettle Hill, they briefly fought hand to hand within the Spanish defensive works, at which point the Spanish retreated. Most reports name the first American soldier to reach the crest of Kettle Hill as Sgt. George Berry of the 10th Cavalry, who took both the 10th and 3rd Cavalry battle flags to the summit. This is supported in the writings of Pershing, who fought with the 10th on Kettle Hill and who was present when Col. Roosevelt reached the top. Politics and racial discrimination led to many myths about the African-American involvement in the fighting in Cuba.

Second Lieutenant Thomas H. Rynning is credited with being the first Rough Rider to reach the top of the hill, where he rallied his men with the Rough Riders' flag.

General Linares's troops on San Juan heights fired on the newly won American position on the crest of Kettle Hill. The Americans returned fire on the entrenched Spanish troops. Seeing the "spontaneous advance" of the 1st Infantry Brigade, led by the 10th Cavalry, General Wheeler (having returned to the front) gave the order for General Kent to advance with his whole division and ordered the 3rd Brigade into the attack. Kent sent forward the 3rd Infantry Brigade, now effectively commanded by Lt. Col. Ezra P. Ewers, to join the advance, which had successfully reached the heights."Previous to the return of the troops the newspapers in the Territory claimed the distinction for Arizona that [George] Truman of B Troop was the first American soldier on the Heights of San Juan. On return of the troops this statement was verified by Middleton, Owens and Sargent Norton of B Troop who were along with, and close to, Truman at the time the ascent was made."

=== Spanish counterattack ===
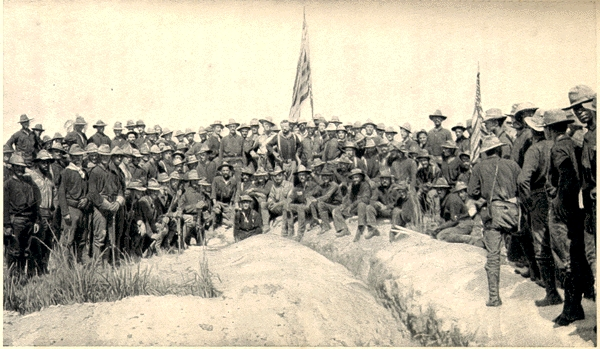
Original title: "Colonel Roosevelt and his Rough Riders at the top of the hill which they captured, Battle of San Juan Hill. US Army victors on Kettle Hill about 3 July 1898 after the battle of San Juan Hill(s)." Left to right are 3rd US Cavalry, 1st Volunteer Cavalry (with Roosevelt at center), and 10th US Cavalry.

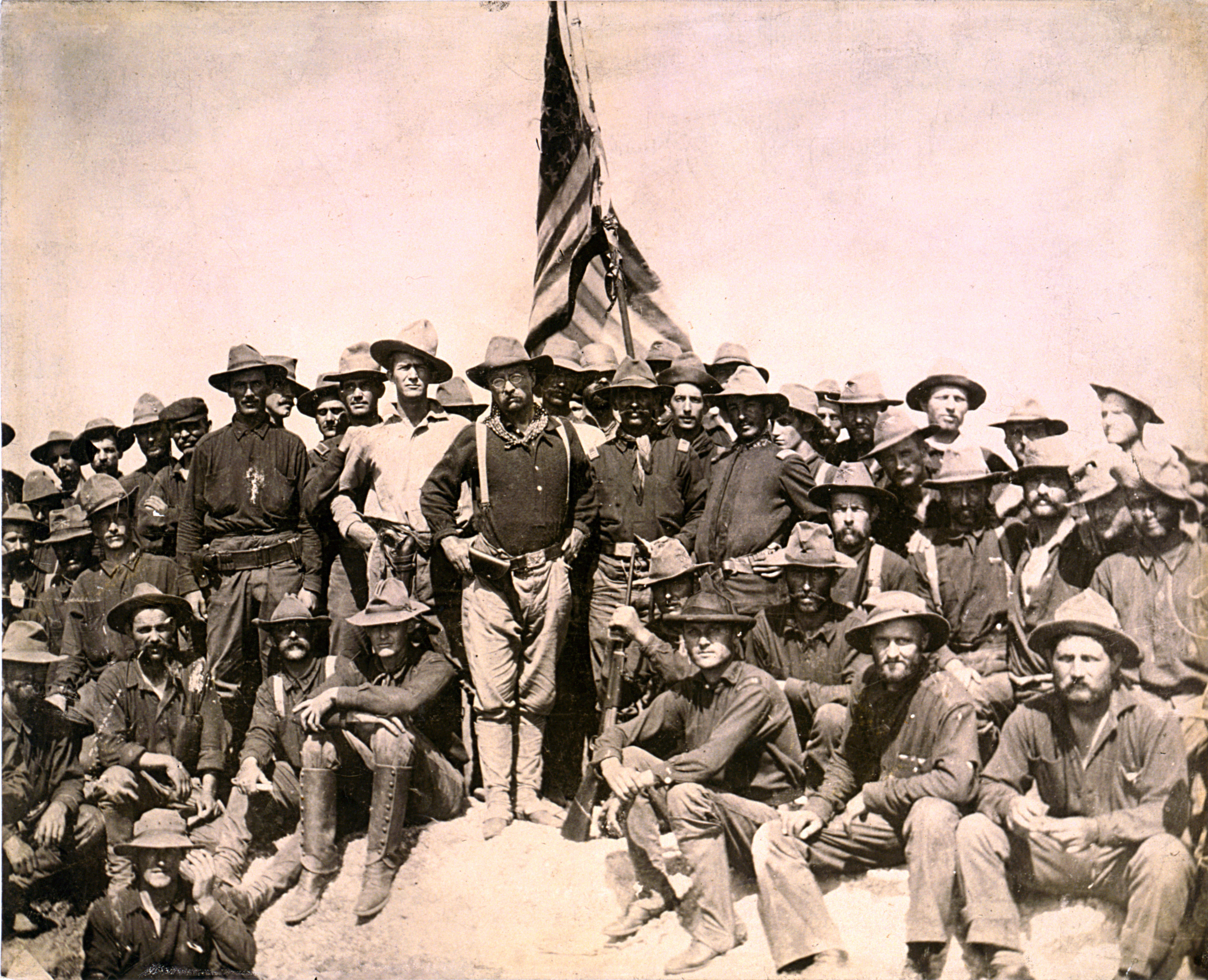
A second similar picture is often seen, in which all but the 1st Volunteer Cavalry and Roosevelt are cropped out.

Witnessing the assault on San Juan Hill, Col. Roosevelt decided to cross the steep ravine from Kettle Hill to San Juan Hill to support the ongoing fighting. Calling for his men to follow, he ran forward, only to find just five of the Rough Riders following him (most had not heard his command). Roosevelt returned, gathered a larger group of men. Under advice he led them down the less steep western slope of Kettle Hill, past a small lagoon, and was ready to start up the northern extension of San Juan Hill. By then the fighting was over at the top of the heights. General Sumner intercepted Roosevelt and angrily ordered him to return to Kettle Hill immediately to prepare for the expected counterattack. When he returned, his men were exhausted and his horse was spent from the heat. When the expected counterattack came, these men were ineffective.

After the Spanish positions atop San Juan Hill had been taken, two of Lt. Parker's Gatling guns were dragged by mules up the slope to the captured position on San Juan ridge, where both were hurriedly emplaced among a line of skirmishers. As the Americans were setting up the guns, the Spanish commenced a general counterattack on the heights. Though the attack on San Juan was quickly broken up, the men on Kettle Hill faced a more serious attack from some 120 Spanish regulars. Ignoring an order from Col. Leonard Wood to reposition one or two of his Gatling guns to the top of Kettle Hill to support the 1st Volunteer and 3rd Cavalry, Parker instead ordered the closest Gatling, manned by Sgt. Green, to fire obliquely against 600 enemy soldiers attacking Kettle Hill. From a range of 600 yd (550 m), Sgt. Green's Gatling responded, killing all but 40 of the attackers.

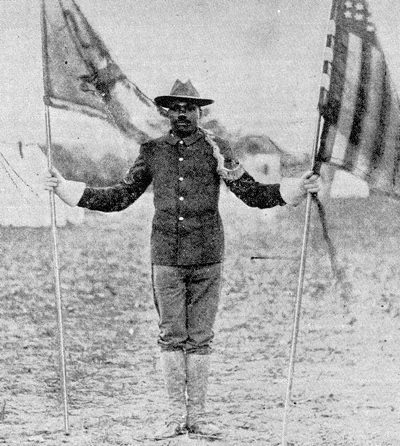
Sergeant George Berry of the 10th Cavalry Regiment, c.1899

After the counterattack was driven off, Lt. Parker moved to Kettle Hill to view the American positions, where he was soon joined by Sgt. Weigle's Gatling and crew from San Juan, detached to the service of Lt. Miley. Miley (who was primarily tasked with inspecting troop positions for General Shafter) had restrained Weigle's crew from opening fire during the entirety of the fighting. Parker then ordered Sgt. Weigle and his crew to emplace their gun on Kettle Hill. This Gatling was used to eliminate Spanish sniper fire against the American defensive positions on Kettle Hill.

Returning to the two Gatlings on San Juan Hill, Lt. Parker had the guns relocated near the road to avoid counter-battery fire. Despite this precaution, the guns were bombarded by a heavy Spanish 6.3 in (160 mm) gun. Parker located the enemy gun and trained the two Gatlings using a powerful set of field glasses. The two Gatlings then opened fire, silencing the Spanish 6.3 in (160 mm) gun at a range of roughly 2,000 yd (1,800 m). July 4, Parker ordered his three operational guns moved into the battle line around the city of Santiago. The wheels of the Gatling carriages were removed, and the Gatlings, along with two 7 mm Colt–Browning machine guns (a gift from Col. Roosevelt) were placed in breastworks where they could command various sectors of fire. The fourth Gatling was repaired and placed in reserve. However, it was soon moved to Fort Canosa, where it was used during the siege of Santiago to fire 6,000–7,000 rounds into the city to help force a surrender.

== Aftermath ==
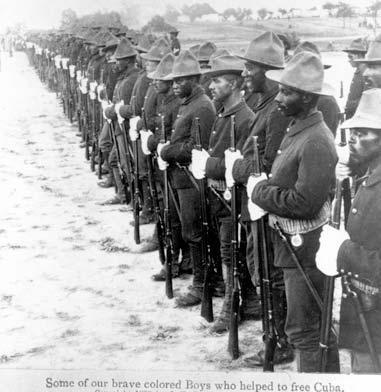
Buffalo Soldiers who participated in the Spanish–American War at San Juan Hill.

The American suffered over twice as many casualties as the Spanish. The Spanish fought to the knife, losing a third of their force in casualties, but yielding very few prisoners. In view of the large number of U.S. casualties incurred from small-arms fire, the Army decided to update and modernize its small arms arsenal. The .45-70 and M1892 (Krag) Springfield rifles were quickly retired from service in favor of new Mauser-pattern .30-03 (later .30-06 Springfield) M1903 Springfield rifles, while the remaining .30 Army Gatling guns were replaced in 1909 by the M1909 Benét–Mercié machine gun.

Lawton's division, which was supposed to have joined the fight early on July 1, 1898, did not arrive until noon the following day, on July 2, 1898, having encountered unexpectedly heavy resistance in the battle of El Caney. The Americans, aided by Cuban insurgents, immediately began the Siege of Santiago, which surrendered just over two weeks later, on July 17, 1898. Although Roosevelt and the Rough Riders achieved considerable fame with the victory, other soldiers fared less well. Ord never received recognition in the popular press of the day for his actions. The Army turned down requests for a medal for his heroism from his commanding officer and his commanding general.

== Bibliography ==
- Armstrong, David A. (1982). Bullets and Bureaucrats: The Machine Gun and the United States Army, 1861–1916. ABC-CLIO. ISBN 978-0-313-23029-5.
- Carrasco García, Antonio, En Guerra con Los Estados Unidos: Cuba, 1898, Madrid: 1998.
- Clodfelter, M. (2017). Warfare and Armed Conflicts: A Statistical Encyclopedia of Casualty and Other Figures, 1492–2015 (4th ed.). McFarland. ISBN 978-0786474707.
- Nofi, Albert A., The Spanish American War, 1898, 1997.
- Parker, John H. (July 1, 2006). The Gatlings at Santiago. Echo Library. ISBN 978-1-84702-393-3.
- Roosevelt, Theodore. The Rough Riders.
- Schubert, Frank N. (1998). Buffalo Soldiers at San Juan Hill. Conference of Army Historians. U.S. Army Center of Military History. Archived from the original on October 23, 2008.
