= Edward P. Pearson =

American brigadier general

Edward Pennington Pearson
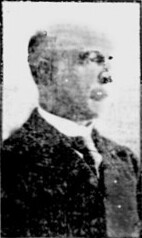
- Pearson in 1911
- Born: February 22, 1837; Lebanon, Pennsylvania, U.S.
- Died: April 8, 1915 (aged 78)\
- Burial place: Fort Rosecrans National Cemetery, San Diego, California, U.S.
- Spouse: Maud Eskridge (m. 1898)
- Military career
- Branch: United States Army (Union Army)
- Service years: 1861–1899
- Rank: Brigadier general of volunteers
- Units: 25th Pennsylvania Infantry Regiment; 17th Infantry Regiment
- Commands: XI Corps; 3rd Brigade of the V Corps
- Conflicts: List: American Civil War; Peninsula Campaign; Siege of Yorktown; Battle of Gaines' Mill; Battle of Malvern Hill; Northern Virginia Campaign; Second Battle of Bull Run; Maryland Campaign; Battle of Antietam; Fredericksburg Campaign; Battle of Fredericksburg; Chancellorsville Campaign; Battle of Chancellorsville; Gettysburg campaign; Battle of Gettysburg; Reopening the Tennessee River; Battle of Wauhatchie; Chattanooga campaign; Atlanta campaign; Battle of Jonesborough; Campaign of the Carolinas; Battle of Bentonville Spanish–American War; Santiago campaign; Battle of San Juan Hill; Siege of Santiago

Edward Pennington Pearson Jr. (1837–1915) was an American brigadier general who served in the American Civil War and the Spanish–American War. He commanded the XI Corps and the 2nd Brigade of the V Corps respectively as well as having an extensive military campaign in both wars as he participated in many battles of the American Civil War.

== American Civil War ==
Edward was born on February 22, 1837, as the son of Edward Pennington Pearson Sr. and Federica Smith Pearson. By the time the American Civil War broke out, he was a civil engineer at Reading, Pennsylvania but chose to enlist at the 25th Pennsylvania Infantry Regiment but transferred to the 17th Infantry Regiment as a 1st Lieutenant. He then participated at the battles of Yorktown, Gaines' Mill, Malvern Hill and the Second Battle of Bull Run. During the Battle of Antietam, Pearson commanded Company E of the 1st Battalion and proceeded to participate at the Battle of Fredericksburg and the Battle of Chancellorsville. He was then brevetted to major on May 3, 1863, for his service at Chancellorsville. He was then made part of Oliver Otis Howard's General Staff of the XI Corps and participated at the Battle of Wauhatchie, the Chattanooga campaign and various skirmishes at the Atlanta campaign with his horse being shot at the Battle of Jonesborough but was brevetted to lieutenant colonel on September 1, 1864. He was transferred again to William Tecumseh Sherman's March to the Sea as part of the right wing and participated at the Battle of Bentonville.

== Years in the Frontier ==
After the war, Pearson continued to serve at the 17th Infantry Regiment as a captain, initially stationing at Raleigh on the spring of 1870. He later served at Texas, Dakota and Montana, notably participating of the establishment of Fort Bennett at South Dakota. He was promoted to major on May 19, 1881, as well as transferred to the 21st Infantry Regiment. He saw new service at Idaho, Oregon, Nebraska and Wyoming before being transferred again to the 24th Infantry Regiment as its lieutenant colonel on April 19, 1886, and colonel of the 10th Infantry Regiment on October 14, 1891. Pearson also married his second wife, Maud Eskridge on April 16, 1898, at Fort Reno.

== Spanish–American War ==
When the Spanish–American War broke out, Pearson commanded the 3rd Brigade of the V Corps at the Battle of San Juan Hill on July 1, 1898, before being commissioned as a brigadier general from July 12, 1898, to November 30, 1898. He retired on May 16, 1899, after battling malaria at Cuba.
