= Siege of Santiago =

1898 land battle of the Spanish–American War

- Part of the Spanish–American War
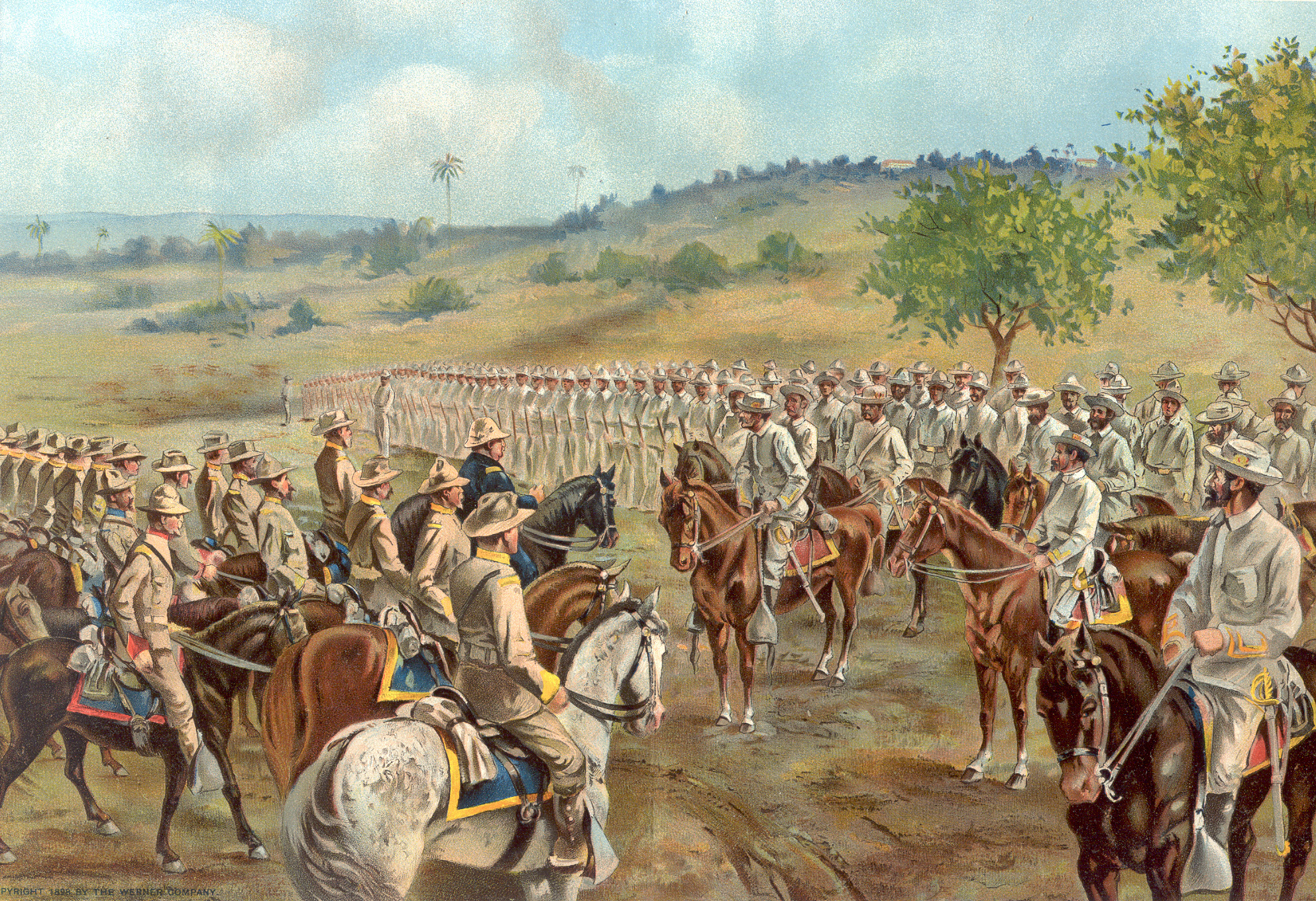
- General Toral's surrender of Santiago to General Shafter, July 13th, 1898, Unknown author
Date	July 3–17, 1898
Location	Santiago, Cuba
Result	American-Cuban victory

Belligerents
United States; Cuban rebels	Spain

Commanders and leaders
(United States) William Shafter; (United States) Nelson Miles; (United States) William Sampson; Calixto García	José Velázquez

Strength
19,000	13,500

Casualties and losses
1,614 killed and wounded	2,000 killed and wounded 11,500 captured

The siege of Santiago, also known as the siege of Santiago de Cuba, was the last major operation of the Spanish–American War on the island of Cuba.

== Santiago campaign ==
The primary objective of the American Fifth Army Corps' invasion of Cuba was the capture of the city of Santiago de Cuba. U.S. forces had driven back the Spaniards' first line of defense at the Battle of Las Guasimas, after which General Arsenio Linares pulled his troops back to the main line of defense against Santiago along San Juan Heights. In the charge at the Battle of San Juan Hill U.S. forces captured the Spanish position. At the Battle of El Caney the same day, U.S. forces took the fortified Spanish position and were then able to extend the U.S. flank on San Juan Hill. The destruction of the Spanish fleet at the Battle of Santiago de Cuba allowed U.S. forces to safely besiege the city.

== Siege ==
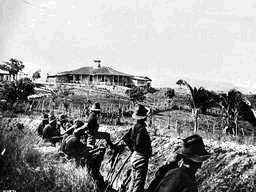
American trenches on San Juan Hill during the siege.

On July 3, 1898, the same day as the naval battle, Major General William "Pecos Bill" Shafter began the siege of Santiago. Shafter fortified his position on San Juan Heights. General Henry W. Lawton's division moved up from El Caney extending the U.S. right flank to the north. To the northwest, Cuban rebels under the command of Calixto Garcia extended the U.S. line to the bay. General Arsenio Linares had been severely wounded at the Battle of San Juan Hill and was replaced by General José Toral y Velázquez. The Spanish also had German military advisors helping to man and operate their artillery. Toral had a good defensive position and Shafter knew he would sustain severe casualties from a frontal assault. All Spanish ships were destroyed bringing forth the reason for surrender.

The Americans began their siege of the city. U.S. artillery sited on the heights pounded the city, while U.S. forces supported by Cuban rebels choked off all water and food supplies to the city. On July 3, a relief column was able to fight its way through Garcia's rebels and into the city bringing Toral's force to a total of 13,500. On July 4, a cease fire was enacted to evacuate roughly 20,000 citizens from the city. Also, on July 4, four .30 Army Gatlings from Lt. John Parker's Gatling Gun Detachment were moved to Fort Canosa in support of the siege, as was a dynamite gun and sixteen field guns. Over the next thirteen days, the Gatlings were used to fire 6,000 to 7,000 rounds into the city of Santiago, causing many casualties.

On July 8, Toral proposed to surrender Santiago if his troops could be evacuated to Holguin. Washington officials would not accept Toral's proposal and the truce ended on July 10. Shafter was now pressed for time as Yellow fever appeared. Shafter and the U.S. Navy under William T. Sampson continued to bomb the city with little effect militarily. General Miles arrived on July 11 along with several regiments, eight field guns and eight light mortars.

== Surrender ==
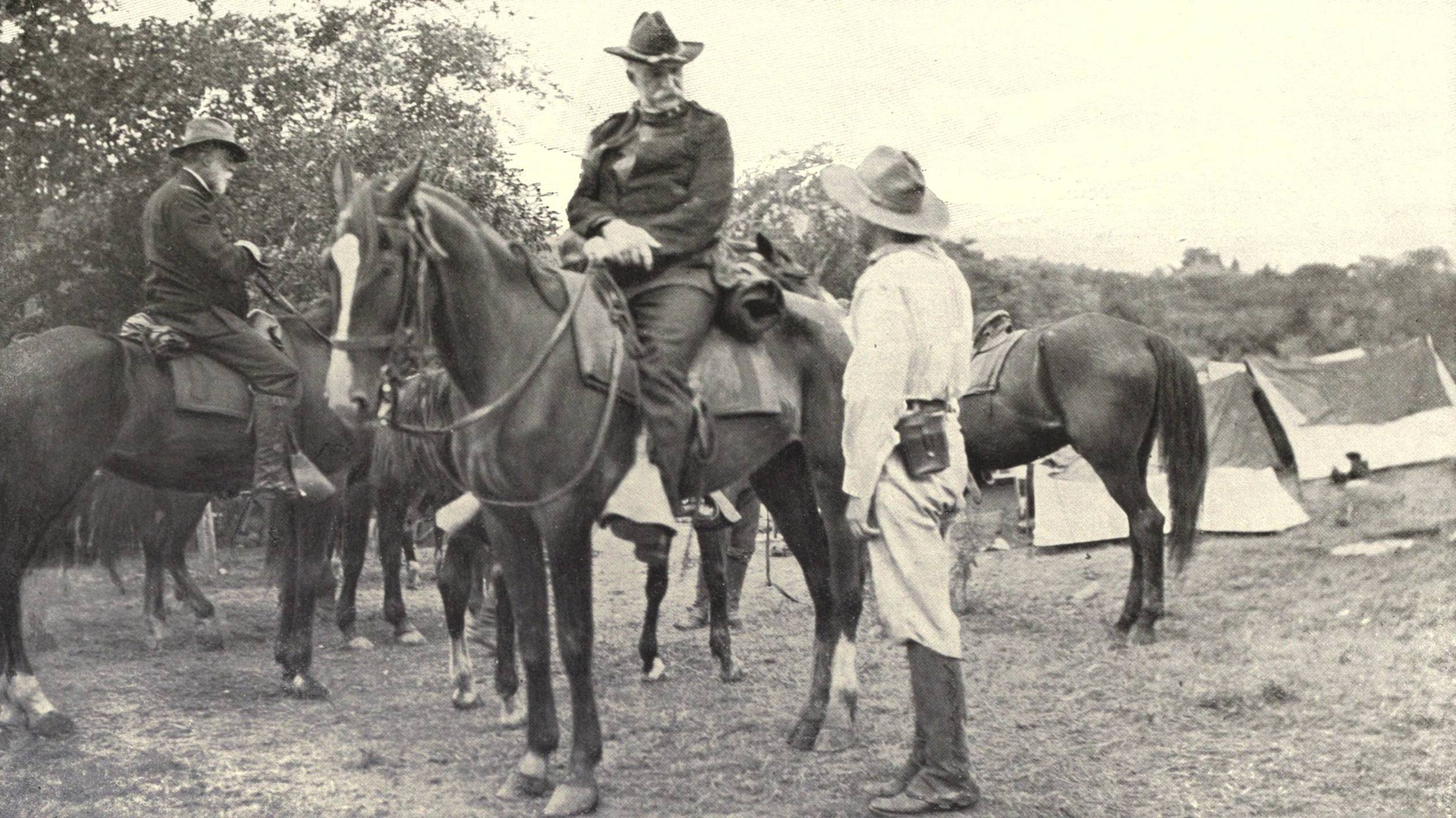
General Miles during surrender negotiations for Santiago

Everyone involved wanted a quick end to the campaign, and at 0900 on July 13, Toral, Shafter, Miles and Joseph Wheeler met under a large tree between lines to discuss surrender terms. The Americans proposed Secretary of War Russell A. Alger's offer to repatriate the Spanish garrison to Spain.. The tree is called the Santiago Surrender Tree and it is part of American Battle Monuments Commission

Shafter relied on his friend Dr. George E. Goodfellow's excellent knowledge of Spanish to help negotiate the final surrender after the Battle of San Juan Hill. Goodfellow attributed part of his success to a bottle of "ol' barleycorn" he kept handy in his medical kit which he properly prescribed to himself and Spanish General Toral, lending a more convivial atmosphere to the conference.

On July 16, after both governments agreed to the terms of capitulation ("surrender" was avoided), in which Toral surrendered his garrison and all troops in the Division of Santiago, an additional 9,000 soldiers. The Spanish also ceded Guantanamo City and San Luis. The Spanish troops marched out of Santiago on July 17.

== Aftermath ==
The siege effectively ended the major fighting on Cuba, but the war was not yet over. Yellow fever had spread through the U.S. Army before the surrender had taken place, and some 4,000 U.S. soldiers were ill with malaria, yellow fever, and dysentery by July 28. Many officers, notably Theodore Roosevelt, fought for the removal of the army from Cuba, writing the Round Robin, which was leaked to the press. The Fifth Army Corps was recalled and sent to Camp Wikoff, where of the 20,000 men sent there, only 257 died from yellow fever or malaria.

The Red Cross ship, City of Texas, with Clara Barton aboard, was the first ship into Santiago harbor. Plans were made for a major assault on Havana, but the next major campaign of the war came on Puerto Rico, led by General Miles.

== See also ==
- Battles of the Spanish–American War
- Santiago order of battle
