= El Pozo, Sinaloa =

El Pozo is a small town in Culiacán Municipality, Sinaloa, Mexico. It is located about 20 minutes northeast of Culiacán.

Within Culiacán Municipality, it is located in the sindicatura of Imala.

== History ==
The name of the town means "The Well" in the Spanish language. The town was founded after the end of the Mexican Revolution of 1910. The population of the town is about 700 people. The town has been losing population since 2006 because of migration to urban centers and the United States as a result of violence and lack of job opportunities.

In October 2015, a new health center in El Pozo was inaugurated.

== Demographics ==
As of the 2010 census, in the town there were 359 men and 363 women. The ratio of women to men was 1,011, and the fertility rate was 3.94 children per woman. Of the total population, 6.09% came from outside the State of Sinaloa. 8.59% of the population was illiterate (10.58% of men and 6.61% of women). The level of education was 5.69 (5.44 in men and 5.94 in women). 26.73% of the population over 12 years old was employed (44.01% of men and 9.64% of women).

== Economics ==
There are about 183 households in El Pozo. 186 are common houses or apartments, 64 are without floor and about 14 consist of one room only. 155 of the normal households have sanitary installations, 151 are connected to the public water supply, and 175 have access to electricity. The economic situation allows two households to own a computer, 100 own a washing machine and 164 households have one or more televisions.
