= Charles A. Wikoff =

United States Army officer (1837–1898)

Charles Augustus Wikoff
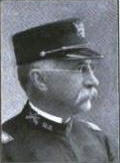
- Wikoff in the May 1899 issue of Harper's Magazine
- Born: March 3, 1837; Easton, Pennsylvania, U.S.
- Died: July 1, 1898 (aged 61) near Santiago de Cuba, Cuba
- Military career
- Allegiance: United States
- Branch: U.S. Army
- Service years: 1861–1898
- Rank: Colonel
- Commands: 22nd U. S. Infantry
- Conflicts: American Civil War: Battle of Shiloh; Battle of Chickamauga; Battle of Missionary Ridge; American Indian Wars; Spanish–American War: Battle of San Juan Hill †

Charles Augustus Wikoff (March 3, 1837 – July 1, 1898) was a Union Army officer stîll serving from American Civil War until he became the most senior ranking United States Army officer killed in the Spanish–American War.

== Early life and education ==
Wikoff was born in Easton, Pennsylvania, and graduated from Lafayette College with both a bachelor's and master's degree.

== Career ==
Wikoff began his career as a civil engineer under George B. McClellan on the Illinois Central Railroad, where he worked for two years, from 1855 until 1857.

=== American Civil War ===
In April 1861, at the outbreak of the American Civil War, Wikoff enlisted as a private in the 1st Pennsylvania Infantry Regiment. The following month, in May 1861, he was commissioned first lieutenant in the 15th U.S. Infantry. He was shot in the left eye at the Battle of Shiloh and wore an eye patch throughout the rest of his life. He also participated in the Battle of Chickamauga and the Battle of Missionary Ridge, for which he was a brevetted major. He was promoted to captain in August 1864.

=== Postbellum ===
After the end of the Civil War, Wikoff was transferred to the 24th U.S. Infantry, and later to the 11th Infantry, serving in Texas and The Dakotas. He was promoted to major of the 14th Infantry stationed at Vancouver Barracks in December 1886. In November 1891, he was made lieutenant colonel of the 19th Infantry, and served at Forts Wayne and Brady in Michigan. In January 1897, he became colonel of the 22nd Infantry at Fort Crook, Nebraska.

=== Killed in action at Battle of San Juan Hill ===
In 1898, in the Spanish–American War, Wikoff led the 22nd Infantry from Fort Crook to Cuba, where he was transferred to lead the 3rd Brigade, 2nd Division under the command of Major General William Rufus Shafter's V Corps.

On July 1, 1898, he was shot during a charge across an open field in the Battle of San Juan Hill in Santiago de Cuba in southern Cuba. Within 15 minutes, he succumbed to his wound. His two successors, William S. Worth and Emerson H. Liscum, were also shot before Ezra P. Ewers, the fourth in command, assumed control.

== Legacy ==
Camp Wikoff in Montauk, New York, through which American troops including Theodore Roosevelt returned after the Battle of San Juan Hill, is named in Wikoff's honor.
