= Battle of El Caney =

Battle of the Spanish-American War

- Part of the Spanish–American War
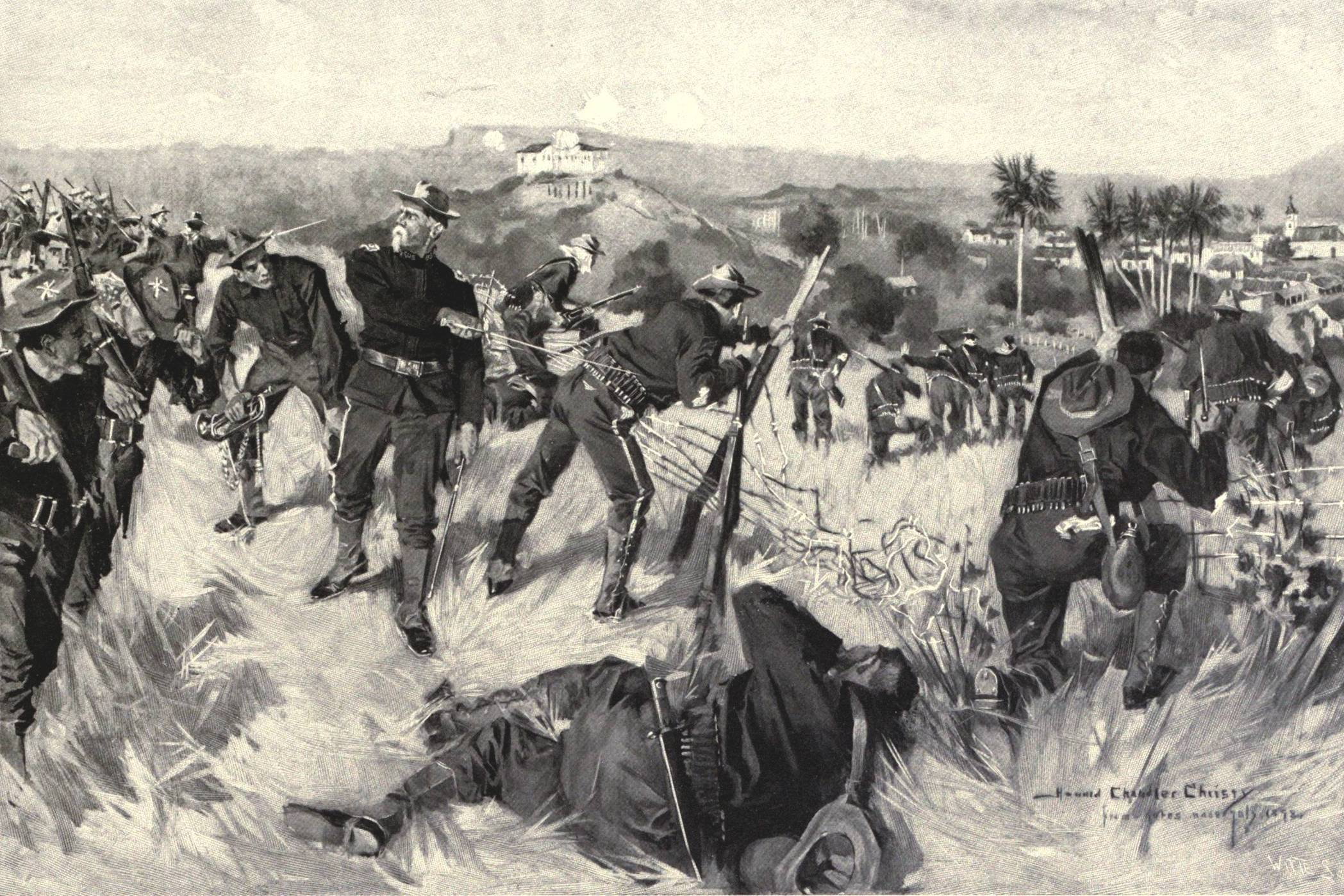
- The Capture of El Caney; Howard Chandler Christy, 1899
Date	July 1, 1898
Location	El Caney, Cuba
Result	American Pyrrhic victory

Belligerents
United States; Cuban rebels	Spain

Commanders and leaders
Henry Lawton	Joaquín Vara de Rey †; Salvador Díaz Ordóñez (WIA)

Strength
18,000; 4 field guns	500; 2 field guns

Casualties and losses
80–205 dead 1,200 wounded	38 killed 138 wounded 160 captured

The Battle of El Caney was fought on July 1, 1898, during the Spanish-American War. 600 Spanish soldiers held for twelve hours, until they ran out of ammunition, against Henry W. Lawton's 5th US Division, made up of 6,899 men. This action temporarily delayed the American advance on the San Juan Hills, as had been requested of General William Rufus Shafter. Nevertheless, American forces advanced on San Juan Hill the same day. Though encountering spirited resistance similar to El Caney, the Americans were ultimately victorious, culminating in the capitulation of the Spanish garrison.

== Background ==
At El Caney, Cuba, 514 Spanish regular soldiers, together with approximately 100 armed Spanish and Cubans loyal to Spain under the command of Brigadier General Joaquín Vara de Rey y Rubio were instructed to hold the northwest flank of Santiago de Cuba against the American 2nd Division, Fifth Army Corps, commanded by Brigadier General Henry W. Lawton.

== Battle ==
Although the Spanish defenders had no machine guns, they were well equipped with modern smokeless powder rifles and a battery of two modern breech-loading 80mm mountain howitzers (Cañón de 8 cm Plasencia Modelo 1874, designed by Colonel Plasencia of the Spanish Army) that also utilized smokeless ammunition. The Spanish regular infantry was armed with fast-firing M1893 7mm Mauser rifles, while the loyalists were equipped with single-shot Remington Rolling Block rifles in .43 Spanish (using blackpowder). Denied promised reinforcements from Santiago, Vara de Rey and his forces held over 6,000 Americans from their position for nearly twelve hours before retreating, preventing General Lawton's men from reinforcing the U.S. assault on San Juan Hill.

Some of the American forces were hindered by their equipment; in the case of the 2nd Massachusetts, the men were equipped with antiquated black-powder single-shot .45-70 Springfield rifles. According to Frederick E. Pierce, a trooper of the 2nd Massachusetts, the Americans "received such a shower of bullets that it seemed at one time as if the company must be wiped out of existence." Because of this unequal contest, the 2nd Massachusetts was later taken out of the line and replaced with troops armed with more modern weapons.

The American forces also lacked effective support fire, as the single Gatling Gun Detachment under lieutenant John Henry Parker had been sent to support the troops assaulting San Juan heights. General Lawton's artillery support consisted of a single battery of four 3.2-inch (81 mm) Model 1885 field guns—light breech-loading rifled cannon using black-powder ammunition. The relatively short range of the American gun battery—together with the signature cloud of black smoke generated with each volley—forced gun crews to endure a fusillade of Mauser rifle fire from the Spanish defenders. General Lawton's initial decision to continually shift the battery's fire to multiple targets resulted in minimal effect on the Spanish strongpoints. Continued assaults took a heavy toll of the attackers. During the fighting, General Vara del Rey was wounded in both legs. While being evacuated on a stretcher, Vara del Rey and his escorts came under intense American fire. Vara del Rey and several Spanish officers accompanying the group (including one of the General's sons) were killed by American fire as they tried to evacuate. His body was later found after the battle by a group of Spanish officers sent to locate him, and he was buried nearby. Despite Vara del Rey's death, Spanish resistance continued.

After an initial repulse, Lawton ordered his battery of four 3.2-inch guns, commanded by Capt. Allyn Capron, to concentrate fire on the El Viso strongpoint in the Spanish defenses. Capron's guns successfully breached the strongpoint walls at a range of 1,000 yards. An attack was then launched by two U.S. infantry regiments, the 12th Infantry and the 25th Infantry, and after a bloody firefight, El Viso was captured. Private T. C. Butler, Company H, 25th Infantry, was the first man to enter the blockhouse at El Caney, and took possession of the Spanish colors. Once El Viso was taken, the U.S. battery reduced each Spanish strongpoint in turn. The fighting ended about 5:00pm with the withdrawal of the Spanish troops.

== Aftermath ==
Though eventually successful, the attack on the fortifications of El Caney had proved to be of little real value. The attack on two strongly defended points at both El Caney and San Juan diluted the strength of American forces, resulting in delays and additional casualties.

About 185 Spanish escaped to the north, but Vara del Rey, his two sons, and his brother perished. One of the Spanish wounded was Colonel Salvador Diaz-Ordóñez, who commanded the Spanish artillery and was the designer of the Ordóñez guns that the Spanish used as coastal artillery in Cuba.

Approximately 400–600 of the retreating Spanish defenders at El Caney later participated in a hastily organized counterattack against troopers of the U.S. 3rd Cavalry and the 1st Volunteer Cavalry atop Kettle Hill. After closing to within 200 yards of Kettle Hill, they were taken under fire at a range of 600 yards by a single ten-barrel .30 Gatling Gun atop San Juan Hill manned by Sgt. Green of the Gatling Gun Detachment. According to Spanish commanders captured after the battle, all but 40 of the 600 attacking Spanish troops were killed by the Gatling gun fire.

General Vara del Rey's body was relocated where it had been buried and was exhumed five months after the battle by a Spanish commission. The commission members were accompanied by Cuban Captain Alberto Plochet and a sergeant, who recognized the general by his insignia, his long beard, and an enormous Remington bullet hole in his skull.

== See also ==
- Last stand

== Bibliography ==
- Albert A. Nofi (1997). The Spanish–American War, 1898. Combined Books. ISBN 0-938289-57-8.
- Carrasco García, Antonio, En Guerra con Los Estados Unidos: Cuba, 1898, Madrid: 1998
- Dierks, Jack, A Leap to Arms: The Cuban Campaign of 1898, Philadelphia PA: J.B. Lippincott Company (1970)
- Parker, John H. (Lt.), The Gatlings At Santiago, Middlesex, UK: Echo Library (reprinted 2006)
