= James Henry Wright =

American jurist (1838–1905)

Chief Justice, Arizona Territorial Supreme Court
- In office March 19, 1887 – May 7, 1890
- Nominated by: Grover Cleveland
- Preceded by: John C. Shields
- Succeeded by: Henry C. Gooding

Personal details
- Born: August 13, 1838 (Note: Some sources list Wright's year of birth as 1839.) Franklin County, Kentucky
- Died: January 17, 1905 (aged 66) Prescott, Arizona Territory
- Party: Democratic
- Profession: Attorney
- Military career
- Allegiance: Confederate States
- Branch: Confederate Army
- Rank: Captain

James Henry Wright (c. August 13, 1838 – January 17, 1905) was an American jurist and politician. Following his service in the Confederate States Army during the American Civil War, Wright became an attorney in Missouri, where he served as mayor of Carrollton and a member of the Missouri House of Representatives. Wright was appointed Chief Justice of the Arizona Territorial Supreme Court by President Grover Cleveland. He served for three years before being removed from the bench by President Benjamin Harrison.

== Early life and career ==
Wright was born on August 13, 1838, in Franklin County, Kentucky. His family moved to Missouri in 1854. Wright was educated at Westminster College and the University of Missouri. Having studied law, he was admitted to the Missouri bar in 1865.

During the American Civil War, he served with the Confederate States Army and rose to the rank of captain. Following the war he settled in Carrollton, Missouri. In addition to his legal practice, Wright served several terms as city mayor. In 1885, he represented Carroll County in the Missouri House of Representatives. Wright's wife was named Mary. The marriage produced four children: Ed S., Harry, Mary, and Gladys.

== Chief Justice ==
Following the United States Senate's decision to reject the recess appointment of John C. Shields, President Grover Cleveland nominated Wright to become Chief Justice of the Arizona Territorial Supreme Court on February 4, 1887. The new justice was assigned to district three, comprising Apache, Mohave, and Yavapai counties. Wright took his oath of office on March 19, the same day he arrived in Prescott, and began his first session as chief justice on March 21, 1887. He received a salary from the Federal government of $3,000/year. The territory supplemented this with an additional $900/year. When Washington officials asked about the chief justice's high level of travel, Wright reminded Attorney General William H. H. Miller that his judicial district covered an area the size of Miller's home state of Indiana.

As chief justice, Wright wrote fifteen majority opinions. He also wrote five dissenting opinions, an unusually large number for the era. His dissents could be rather lengthy. In ''Cheyney v. Smith, 3 Arizona 143 (1890), Wright wrote an eleven-page dissent, while his dissent in Bryan v. Pinney, 3 Arizona 34 (1889) reached twelve pages, and the chief justice's dissent in a case determining if the territorial legislature's authorization for a maximum of 60 days referred to calendar days or working days.

Two of the chief justice's majority opinions involved water rights. In Hill v. Normand, 2 Arizona 354 (1888), Wright found that while riparian rights were established under Common law, they were not the norm along the U.S. Pacific Coast, while in Dalton v. Rentaria, 2 Arizona 275 (1887) he ruled against a party attempting to block access to the Santa Cruz river on the basis that territorial law was intended to promote the development of the territory. The court ordered the local sheriff to seize a property after determining in O'Doherty v. Toole, 2 Arizona 288 (1887), that a defendant's attempt to sell ownership of his real property to his wife for one dollar was done fraudulently. Wright's opinion in Reilly v. Clark, 2 Arizona 299 (1888) determined the territorial supreme court would not overrule the discretionary power of a probate judge unless the judge clearly abused his authority. King v. Hawkins, 2 Arizona 258 (1888) dealt with a territorial official who attempted to reassign a portion of his salary to another person, while United States v. Hart, 2 Arizona 415 (1888) involved an Indian agent who was allegedly misappropriating funds. Two of Wright's opinions were appealed to the United States Supreme Court. The appeals resulted in Ely v. New Mexico and Arizona Railroad Company, 2 Arizona 420 (1888) being reversed while Alta Mining and Smelting v. The Benson Mining and Smelting Co., 2 Arizona 362 (1888) was upheld.

Following the inauguration of President Benjamin Harrison, critics of the chief justice began calling for his removal. Accusations included charges that Wright was "arbitrary", that he displayed "very strong prejudges" and was part of the territorial Democratic machine. In addition to Wright's denials of the accusation, Buckey O'Neill came to his defense calling the accusations "outrageous and cowardly attacks" designed to place someone friendly to the railroads on the bench. The U.S. Department of Justice investigated the claims, and issued a report recommending Wright's removal. In reference to Arizona's practice of paying a supplemental salary the report found "that he unlawfully received and still retains additional compensation for his services as Judge." The primary reason for his removal instead appears to have been a personal letter that Wright sent to a friend, and which later became public, in which the chief justice called the 1888 Republican National Convention a "howling mob composed of thieves, bribers, and bribe takers, scoundrels, and unprincipled persons who, if they had their dues, would be in prison". Wright's replacement, Henry C. Gooding, was sworn in on May 7, 1890.

== Later life and death ==
After leaving the bench, Wright remained in Prescott and returned to private legal practice. He was also active in Democratic politics, giving talks on various political questions, and was a member of the Independent Order of Odd Fellows. His wife was active in the Episcopal Church. Wright died on January 17, 1905. Despite his service to the Confederacy, he was given a military funeral with U.S. Army soldiers from Fort Whipple marching at the head of the procession. Wright's widow died on March 31, 1908. Both husband and wife were buried in Prescott's Citizens Cemetery.
