= Calentura =

Calentura may refer to:

- Cuban fever, in older English sources often "calenture"
- in Spanish, fever, or sexual arousal

== Geography ==
- Capiro Calentura National Park

== Arts and entertainment ==
- La calentura, 1847 poem by José Zorrilla
- Orquesta La Calentura Álvaro del Castillo
- Calentura, album by ChocQuibTown runner up for Latin Grammy Award for Record of the Year 2011
- Calentura (song), Yandel 2015
- "La Calentura", a song by cumbia band Roberto Ruiz y su Maquina Tropical featured on John Doe (The X-Files)

== See also ==
- Calenture (album)
