= Henry Nash =

American Rough Rider and educator (1869–1902)

- Born: September 9, 1869; Mount Sterling, Indiana, US
- Died: July 5, 1902 (age 32); Manila, Luzon, the Philippines
- Burial place: Globe Cemetery, Globe, Arizona
- Military career
- Allegiance: United States of America
- Branch: United States Army
- Service years: 1898
- Rank: Sergeant
- Nickname: Harry Nash
- Unit: 1st United States Volunteer Cavalry Regiment
- Conflicts: Spanish–American War: Battle of Las Guasimas; Battle of San Juan Hill; Siege of Santiago

Henry W. Nash, (September 9, 1869 – July 5, 1902) was an Arizona pioneer who served as a Sergeant in Theodore Roosevelt's Rough Riders during the Spanish–American War. Later, he was one of the first Thomasites sent by the U.S. government to establish an English language-based public education system in the Philippines in the early 1900s.

== Early life ==
Henry W. Nash was born in Mount Sterling, Indiana, the son of Louise Walden Nash and disgraced Civil War veteran George W. Nash. Nash was of English ancestry, his earliest immigrant ancestors coming to America as Puritans from England during the Puritan migration to New England. His father had been a Lieutenant in Company E of the First Missouri Cavalry, but was arrested for murder in 1862 and escaped during his trial. A few months after his escape, he enlisted in the "California Hundred" of the 2nd Massachusetts Cavalry under an assumed name. After attempting to seek a pardon for his murder charge, he was re-arrested and dishonorably discharged in July 1863. After his discharge, George Nash moved to Mount Sterling, married Louise Walden on December 30, 1863, had two children, Carrie (born November 15, 1864) and Henry, and resumed his pre-war occupation as a school teacher.

Harry Nash grew up in Mount Sterling and attended school a few miles south in Vevay, Indiana. He went on to college at DePauw University in Greencastle, Indiana.

== Arizona Territory ==
After finishing his education at DePauw, Nash headed to the Arizona Territory, where his parents and sister had moved in the mid-1880s. In 1887, his sister Carrie married John Henry "Rimrock" Thompson, the widely known Sheriff of Gila County.

In Arizona, Nash taught at many schools in Gila County and Yavapai County, including the Strawberry School near Payson, Arizona. The Strawberry School had been built in 1884, largely through the efforts of Nash's uncle, Lafayette P. Nash, and was under the jurisdiction of Yavapai County school superintendent Buckey O'Neill. Harry Nash would become friends with O'Neill, who served as Sheriff and then Mayor of Prescott, Arizona in the 1890s. Whenever school was not in session, Nash found work as a ranch hand and cowboy, but became especially interested in mining. As time went on, he would study assaying in San Francisco and owned "some fine claims" in Gila County.

== Political career ==
Both Buckey O'Neill and Nash were active leaders of Arizona's Populist Party. In 1896, Nash served as a delegate to the Populist Party territorial convention, where he was elected Secretary, and supported O'Neill as the Populist's Arizona Territory Delegate to the United States House of Representatives. Nash himself ran unsuccessfully for Gila County Recorder in 1896 on the Democratic-Populist Fusion Ticket.

In 1896, the National Direct Legislation League ("N.D.L.L.") was founded, and both Nash and O'Neill became active in local efforts to reduce public corruption by establishing an initiative and referendum system that allowed direct legislation by the territory's citizens. In 1897, Nash was appointed the N.D.L.L. Vice-president and Organizer for the Arizona Territory, and wrote a weekly column in the Prescott Pick and Drill promoting the cause. With the aid of O'Neill, Nash secured the passage of several minor direct legislation laws in the territorial legislature.

== The Rough Riders ==
In 1898, war broke out between the United States and Spain. On May 2, Nash enlisted as a Corporal to serve in Troop A of the 1st United States Volunteer Cavalry. His enlistment papers noted that he had a fair complexion, dark brown eyes, dark brown hair, and was 5' 6¾" tall. Nash gave his occupation as "Cow Boy".

The 1st Volunteer Cavalry would soon be widely known as the "Rough Riders" under the command of Colonel Theodore Roosevelt. Roosevelt had previously pushed for American support of Cuban independence in his role as Assistant Secretary of the Navy. Roosevelt's Rough Riders included many college athletes, cowboys, and ranchers. In April, Buckey O'Neill had also joined the Regiment as Captain of Troop A, and thus was Nash's Troop commander. O'Neill tried to establish an entire Cavalry Regiment made up of Arizona cowboys, but only Troop A and Troop B, with 107 men each, eventually fought in Cuba.

Nash and the other men mustered in at Fort Whipple Barracks near Prescott, Arizona. On May 4, Arizona's Troops marched down to the Prescott town plaza for a grand send-off before they boarded a train headed to San Antonio for difficult and intensive training with "half broken range horses". Nash apparently did well, as he was promoted to Sergeant on May 14. At the end of May, they traveled from San Antonio to Tampa, Florida, their embarkation point. On June 13, eight Troops, including A and B, boarded the transport Yucatan No. 8 for Cuba. Four Troops from the Regiment and almost all the men's horses were left behind.

The Rough Riders landed at Daiquirí, Cuba, on June 22, 1898. Nash, by then, had been made Troop A's Second Duty Sergeant, the third highest ranking non-commissioned officer in the Troop after the First Sergeant and the First Duty Sergeant. The next afternoon, the Regiment hiked twelve miles through a jungle to Siboney. On June 24, Nash and the Rough Riders saw their first action at the Battle of Las Guasimas, as 940 Americans advanced steadily against 4000 Spaniards. Nash also participated in the decisive Battle of San Juan Hill on July 1, 1898, where the Rough Riders, led by Colonel Roosevelt, charged and took Kettle Hill, driving the Spanish forces from their trenches. But the victory was not without cost as Captain Buckey O'Neill was killed in action while fighting that day. The Regiment kept the pressure on through the Siege of Santiago that ultimately ended the war in Cuba within a few more weeks.

The camps of the Rough Riders were infested with malaria, and the men were more affected by the mosquito-borne disease than they had been by Spanish bullets. On August 8, the weary Regiment shipped out of Santiago, headed for Camp Wikoff at Montauk Point, New York on Long Island. Upon reaching Camp Wikoff on August 25, Nash was hospitalized with "malarial fever" contracted while in Cuba.

Nash and the rest of the Regiment mustered out of the service on September 15, 1898, and he arrived back home in Globe on October 7 as a war hero. Upon his return, Nash gave "a very interesting account of the Santiago campaign" and paid "a high tribute to the bravery and soldierly bearing of the late Capt. Bucky O'Neil who commanded A Troop." He soon resumed teaching, but headed to the mountains in search of gold, silver and copper after his school sessions were over. The Arizona Silver Belt descriptively noted his departure from Globe in May 1900 as he headed out in search of that summer's fortune: "Harry Nash, the straight up and all around hustler, soldier and miner, left Friday for the South."

== Service as a Thomasite in the Philippines ==
In the fall of 1900, Nash received an appointment from the U.S. government to teach in the Philippines with an annual salary of $1,200. He became one of the Thomasites, whose government mission was to send 500 teachers to the Philippines to establish a new public school system, train Filipino teachers, and teach basic education with English as the medium of instruction. The name "Thomasite" became the designation of all pioneer American teachers in the Philippines, because the United States Army Transport Thomas, which arrived in Manila in August 1901, carried the largest contingent of teachers. Nash, however, had arrived in Manila, Luzon in December 1900 in advance of the Thomas. He taught in Macabebe, and by the summer of 1902, he was superintendent of schools in his district. While in the Philippines, Nash wrote at least two letters to his old Rough Riders Commander, President Theodore Roosevelt, and the President wrote short letters back to him.

== Death ==
Henry W. Nash took ill after school on July 3, 1902, and checked himself in to a Manila hospital. Two days later, he was dead of a cerebral hemorrhage at age 32. Nash had been a charter member of the Elks Club of Manila, as well as Treasurer of the Manila Rough Riders Association, and the two organizations collaborated to hold a large memorial service for him on July 13 in Manila. The Elks took responsibility for returning his remains to the United States. His body was placed on the transport Burford, which left Manila on July 29 and arrived in San Francisco on September 6. The Elks Club of San Francisco then arranged to send the body back to Globe, where it was received on September 17 by his brother-in-law Sheriff Rimrock Thompson, and a delegation of Elks and former Rough Riders. Nash's funeral was held on September 21, 1902, and he was buried in Globe Cemetery. Albert P. Wright, a friend and fellow former Rough Rider in Manila, wrote to inform President Roosevelt, and the President wrote back, expressing his surprise and sorrow at the news "of the death of poor Nash."
