= Buckey O'Neill =

Arizona Territory pioneer (1860–1898)

William Owen O'Neill
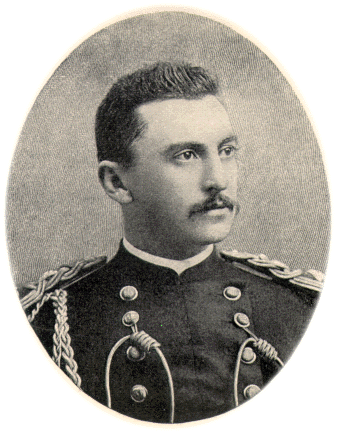
- Born: February 2, 1860; St. Louis, Missouri, US
- Died: July 1, 1898 (aged 38); San Juan Hill, Captaincy General of Cuba
- Burial place: Arlington National Cemetery
- Military career
- Allegiance: United States of America
- Branch: United States Army
- Service years: 1898
- Rank: Captain
- Nickname: Buckey
- Unit: 1st Volunteer Cavalry Regiment
- Conflicts: Spanish–American War Battle of Las Guasimas Battle of San Juan Hill

Mayor of Prescott, Arizona
- In office 1897–1898

William Owen "Buckey" O'Neill (February 2, 1860 – July 1, 1898) was a sheriff, newspaper editor, miner, politician, Georgist, gambler and lawyer, mainly in Arizona. His nickname came from his "bucking the tiger", ie. playing the chance card game faro. He later became a captain in Theodore Roosevelt's Rough Riders, and died in battle.

== Early life ==
O'Neill was born the first of four children on February 2, 1860, to John Owen and Mary (McMenimin) O'Neill in St. Louis, Missouri. (Note: O'Neill's place of birth is subject to debate. During his life he claimed to have been born in Missouri and his widow listed "Saint Louis, Mo." as his place of birth when applying for a widow's pension. This is contradicted by his military muster-in roll which listed his place of birth as Ireland and the October 14, 1884 edition of "The Great Register of Yavapai County, Arizona Territory" which listed O'Neill as Native of Ireland and Naturalized by father's naturalization.) His father was an Irish immigrant who had most likely arrived in the United States during the 1850s. By Spring 1862, the family had moved to Philadelphia, Pennsylvania. When the American Civil War began the elder O'Neill joined the 116th Pennsylvania Volunteers. On December 13, 1862, during the Battle of Fredericksburg, the senior O'Neill was wounded and served the rest of the war as a member of the Invalid Corps. The younger O'Neill was educated at Gonzaga College High School and Georgetown Law School.

During the first part of 1879, O'Neill responded to an item in the Washington Star calling for men to migrate to Arizona Territory. He arrived in Phoenix, riding a burro, in September the same year. Upon his arrival in town he was hired as a printer by the Phoenix Herald. By late 1880, O'Neill had become bored with position and sought to experience the "Real West" in the boomtown of Tombstone.

In Tombstone, O'Neill took the opportunity to experience the local saloons before taking a job with The Tombstone Epitaph. By mid-1881 he again felt a wanderlust and left town. Where he went to next is unknown, one story has O'Neill journeying to Hawaii (unlikely due to the travel time) and then traveling through California. He is known to have visited Santa Fe before going to Albuquerque, New Mexico and working briefly as a court reporter. In early 1882, he was back in Phoenix working as a deputy to Marshal Henry Garfias. Several weeks later O'Neill moved to Prescott, his home for the next fifteen years.

== Prescott ==
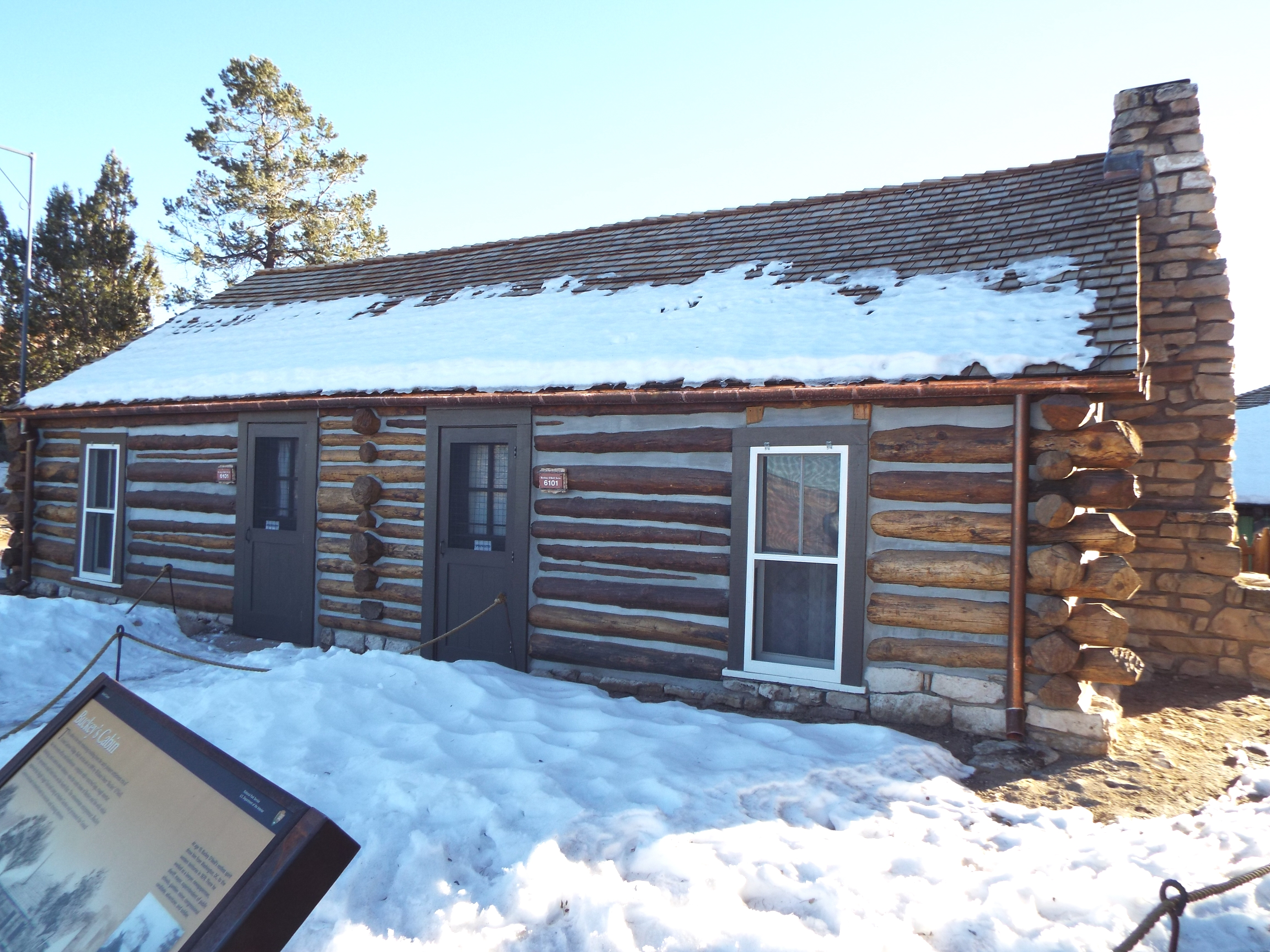
William “Buckey” O’Neil's cabin on the South rim of the Grand Canyon

O'Neill arrived in Prescott in the spring of 1882. There he rapidly progressed in his journalistic career. Starting as a court reporter, he soon founded his own newspaper, Hoof and Horn, a paper for the livestock industry. He became the editor of the Arizona Miner weekly newspaper in 1884 to February 1885.

He became captain of the Prescott Grays in 1886, the local unit of the Arizona Militia. On February 5, 1886, Dennis Dilda, a convicted murderer, was hanged. O'Neill and the Prescott Grays stood honor guard for the event. When the trap dropped, O'Neill fainted, which caused him severe embarrassment. He later wrote a story called "The Horse of the Hash-Knife Brand." In it, a member of a posse admits to nearly fainting at the hanging of a horse thief.

On April 27, 1886, he married Pauline Schindler. They had a son, but he died shortly after being born premature.

In 1888, while serving as Yavapai County, Arizona judge, he was elected county sheriff, running on the Republican ticket.

On March 20, 1889, four masked men robbed the Atlantic and Pacific Railroad passenger train in Diablo Canyon. A four-man posse, made up of O'Neill, Jim Black, Carl Holton, and Ed St. Clair, was soon formed and they took off after robbers. On April 1, O'Neill and his posse caught up with the robbers. After exchanging rifle shots, the posse captured the four men. During the fight, no men were injured, but one of the robber's horses was killed.

The four men were William Sterin, John Halford, Daniel Harvick, and J. J. Smith. All four were sent to the Yuma Territorial Prison, but were pardoned eight years later. There is unfounded speculation that, in 1898, William Sterin enlisted under a false name in the Rough Riders, and was killed in action on San Juan Hill. The character of Henry Nash is incorrectly portrayed as Sterin in the TNT made-for-TV movie "Rough Riders". The real Henry Nash was an Arizona school teacher who also served in Roosevelt's Rough Riders, and was a friend of O'Neill up until his death.

After his term was up, O'Neill was elected unanimously mayor of Prescott.

In 1894 and 1896 he ran for Delegate to the United States House of Representatives from Arizona Territory, running on the Populist Party ticket.

One of his best friends was Tom Horn.

In 1897, after years of speculating on mines, he sold a group of claims near the Grand Canyon to Chicago backers, who also proposed building a railroad from Williams to the mines and the South rim. He became a director of the development companies, and soon began railroad surveys, mine developments, and building a smelter. He also used profits to begin building rental buildings—he was headed for financial independence.

O'Neill also helped introduce a bill allowing women to vote in municipal elections in 1897. Although O'Neill convinced his Populist friends to sign the bill into law, the high court dismissed the bill in 1899.

== Rough Riders ==
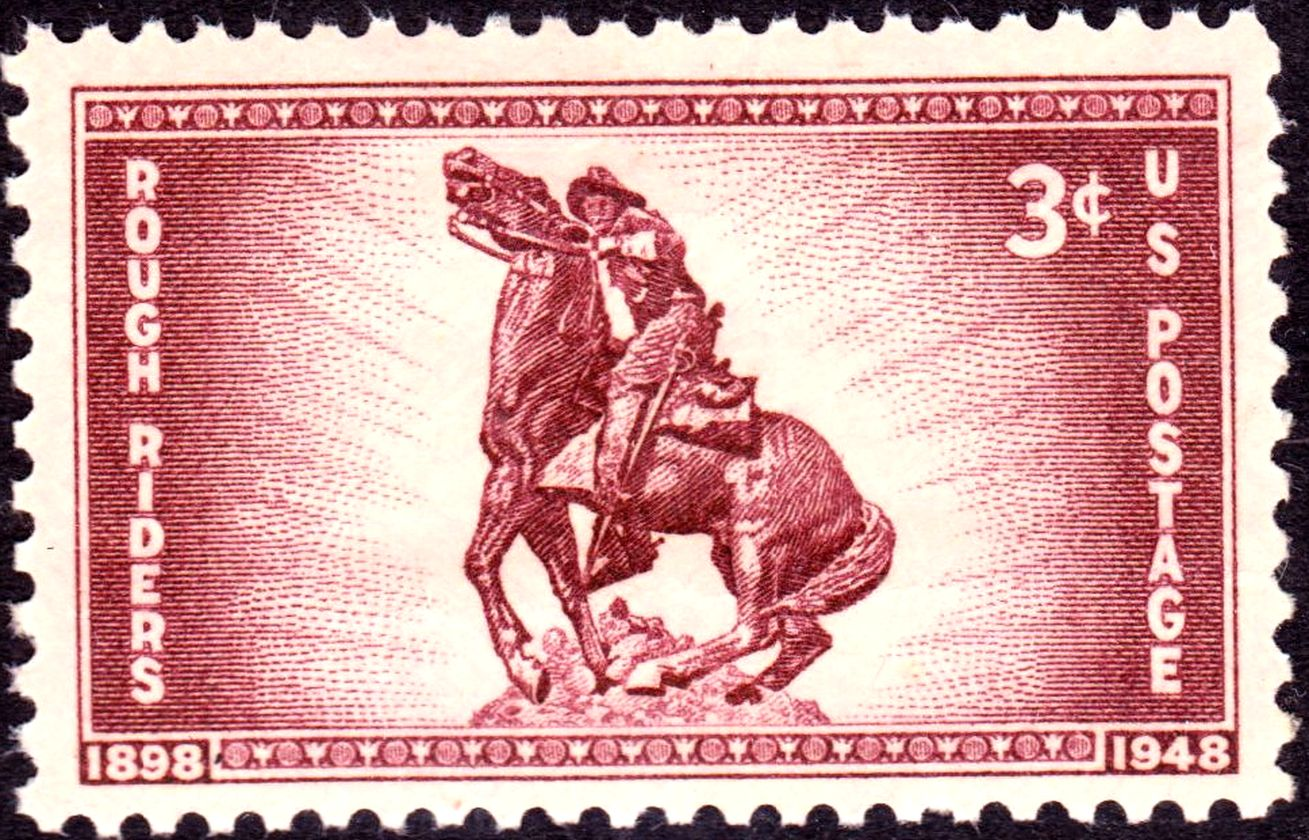
US Postage Stamp, 1948 issue, commemorating 50th anniversary of Theodore Roosevelt's Rough Riders, depicting O'Neill.

In 1898, war broke out between the United States and Spain. O'Neill joined the Rough Riders and became Captain of Troop A. First Lieutenant Frank Frantz served as O'Neil's Deputy Commander. Along with Alexander Brodie and James McClintock, he tried to make an entire regiment made up of Arizona Cowboys. Eventually though, only three troops were authorized.

The Rough Riders landed at Daiquirí on June 22, 1898. Two Buffalo Soldiers, of the 10th Cavalry fell overboard. Upon seeing this, O'Neill jumped into the water in full uniform and sabre. He searched for the men for two minutes, before having to come up for breath.

On June 25, 1898, the Rough Riders saw their first action. O'Neill led his men at the front of the line in the Battle of Las Guasimas, capturing the Spanish flank. During the action he saw several men, who he believed were Spaniards, across the road from him, and shouted "Hostiles on our right, fire at will!" He learned after the firing ceased that the men he exchanged shots with were Cuban rebels.

== Death ==
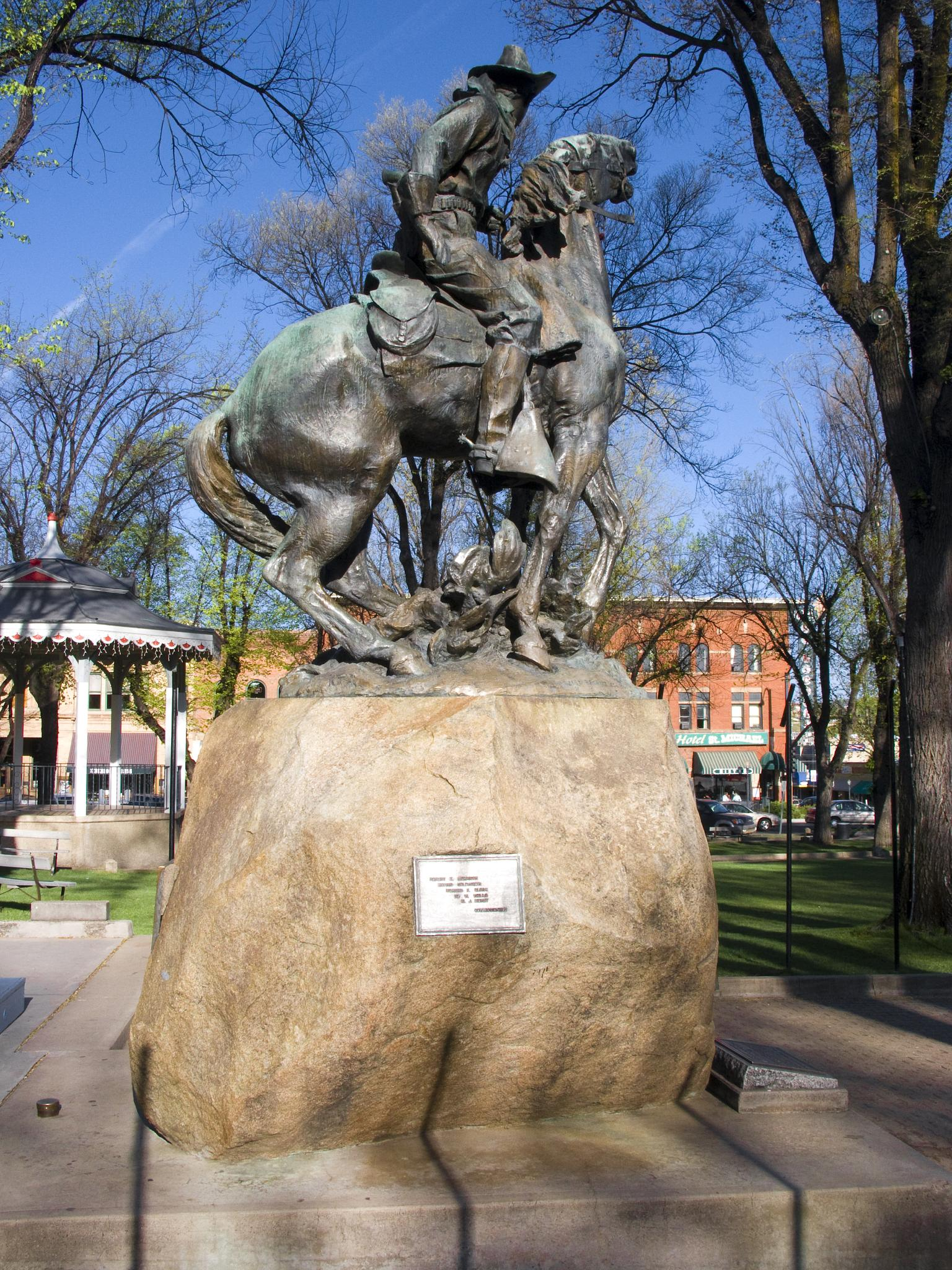
Buckey O'Neill monument, by Solon Borglum.

On July 1, 1898, at about 10am, the Rough Riders and the 10th Cavalry were stationed below Kettle Hill. The Spaniards, who were on top of the hill, poured Mauser rifle fire down on the Americans. Buckey O'Neill was killed in action.

Theodore Roosevelt, commander of the Rough Riders, wrote about the death of O'Neill:

The most serious loss that I and the regiment could have suffered befell just before we charged. O'Neill was strolling up and down in front of his men, smoking his cigarette, for he was inveterately addicted to the habit. He had a theory that an officer ought never to take cover—a theory which was, of course, wrong, though in a volunteer organization the officers should certainly expose themselves very fully, simply for the effect on the men; our regimental toast on the transport running, "The officers; may the war last until each is killed, wounded, or promoted." As O'Neill moved to and fro, his men begged him to lie down, and one of the sergeants said, "Captain, a bullet is sure to hit you." O'Neill took his cigarette out of his mouth, and blowing out a cloud of smoke laughed and said, "Sergeant, the Spanish bullet isn't made that will kill me." A little later he discussed for a moment with one of the regular officers the direction from which the Spanish fire was coming. As he turned on his heel a bullet struck him in the mouth and came out at the back of his head; so that even before he fell his wild and gallant soul had gone out into the darkness.

Before the fighting was over, O'Neill's men had buried him on the slope of San Juan Hill. After the war, his family and friends enlisted help from the War Department to find and recover his body. After six men failed to find the site, the War Department sent Henry Alfred Brown, the Rough Riders' Chaplain, to find him. Despite it being eight months since O'Neill's death, Chaplain Brown located the site within two hours after arriving in Santiago. The well preserved body was exhumed, placed in a coffin, and returned to the United States on the Army transport Crook. He was buried at Arlington National Cemetery, in Arlington, Virginia. The epitaph on his gravestone reads, "Who would not die for a new star on the flag?"

On July 3, 1907, a monument by sculptor Solon Borglum was dedicated to O'Neill and the other Rough Riders in their memory in Prescott, Arizona. Seven thousand people gathered to witness the unveiling.

O'Neill Spring, in the Pumphouse Wash wetlands south of Flagstaff, was named after Buckey O'Neill, as is O'Neill Butte in the Grand Canyon and Bucky O’Neill Hill in Bisbee.

== Movies ==
Bucky (sic) O'Neill is a main character in the TNT movie Rough Riders, portrayed by Sam Elliott.

== See also ==
- Buckey O'Neill Cabin in Grand Canyon National Park, built by O'Neill in 1890 and listed on the National Register of Historic Places
- List of mayors of Prescott, Arizona

== Notes ==
Police appointments
Preceded by William J. Mulvenon	Sheriff of Yavapai County, Arizona Territory; 1889–1890	Succeeded by James R. Lowry
Political offices
Preceded by Morris Goldwater	Mayor of Prescott, Arizona; 1897–1898	Succeeded by F.E. Andrews
