= Norman A. Beecher =

American politician

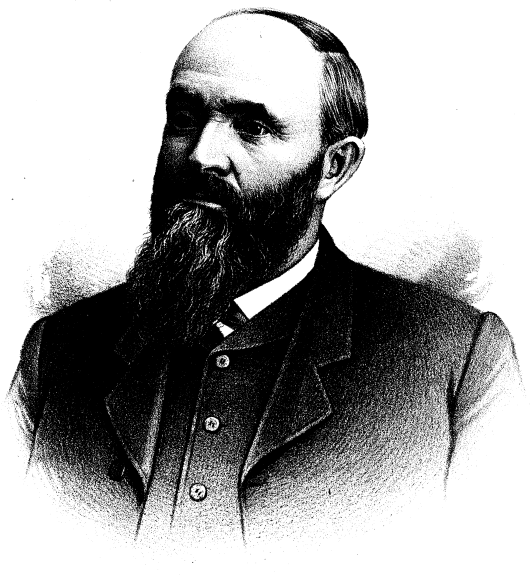

Member of the Michigan House of Representatives from the Genesee County 1st district
- In office January 1, 1885 – December 31, 1888
- Preceded by: Sumner Howard
- Succeeded by: Hezekiah Ranney Dewey

Personal details
- Born: April 22, 1830 Rensselaerville, New York, US
- Died: May 23, 1892 (aged 62) Clayton Township, Michigan, US
- Party: Democratic (Before 1860); Republican (After 1860)
- Spouses: Lovenia D. Billings (m. 1855; d. 1874); Marcelia A. Wood (m. 1875)
- Children: 4

Norman A. Beecher (April 22, 1830 – May 23, 1892) was a Michigan politician.

== Early life ==
Norman A. Beecher was born in Rensselaerville, New York on April 22, 1830, to Calvin and Emeline Beecher. Norman was moved with his family to Owego, New York in 1834. Norman then moved to Orleans County, New York at age 21 around 1851.

== Career ==
Beecher moved to Michigan in 1857, and settled down on a farm in Clayton Township, Michigan the next year. In 1879, Beecher became the first to introduce the American Holderness cattle to Michigan. Beecher was raised as a Democrat, and voted for James Buchanan, but in the 1860 presidential election, Beecher voted for Abraham Lincoln. From then on, Beecher was a Republican. Beecher served as the superintendent of schools in Clayton Township from 1875 to 1876. On November 4, 1884, Beecher was elected to the Michigan House of Representatives where he represented the Genesee County 1st district from January 7, 1885, to December 31, 1888.

== Personal life ==
Beecher married Lovenia D. Billings on September 19, 1855. Lovenia died on September 9, 1874. Beecher went on to marry Marcelia A. Wood on December 1, 1875. Beecher had two children with each of his wives. Beecher was a member of the Methodist Episcopal Church.

== Death ==
Beecher died in Clayton Township on May 23, 1892. Beecher was interred at the Flushing City Cemetery.
