= Hezekiah Ranney Dewey =

American politician

Member of the Michigan House of Representatives from the Genesee County 1st district
- In office January 1, 1889 – December 31, 1890
- Preceded by: Norman A. Beecher
- Succeeded by: George E. Houghton

Personal details
- Born: April 14, 1838 Rochester, New York, US
- Party: Republican

Hezekiah Ranney Dewey (April 14, 1838 – ?) was an American politician in Michigan.

== Early life ==
Dewey was born on April 14, 1838, in Rochester, New York.

== Career ==
Dewey was a farmer for most of his life. On November 6, 1888, Dewey was elected to the Michigan House of Representatives where he represented the Genesee County 1st district from January 2, 1889, to December 31, 1890. Dewey was a Republican.
