= Rough Riders =

US Army cavalry regiment (1898)

First U.S. Volunteer Cavalry Regiment
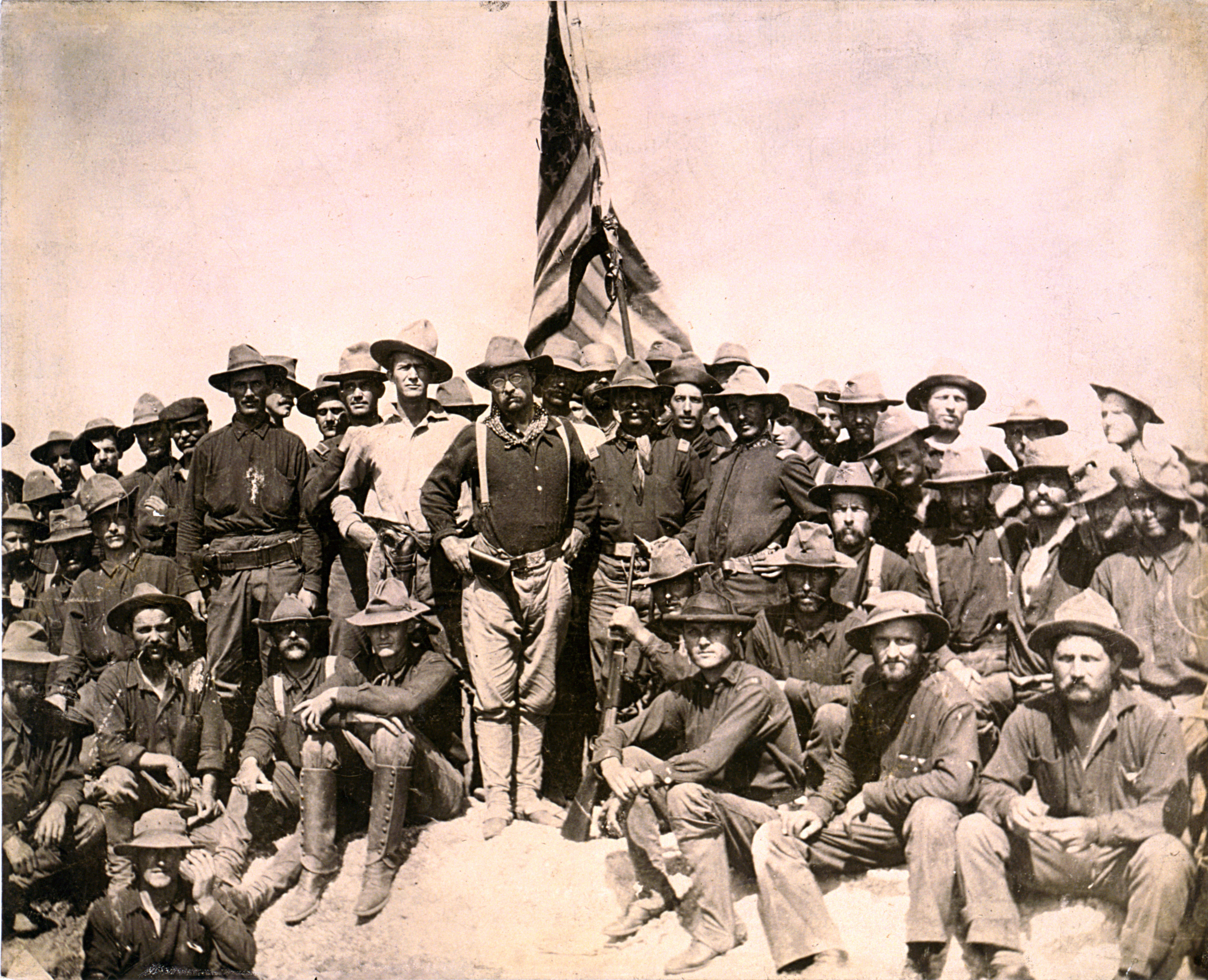
- The Rough Riders at the Battle of San Juan Hill in Santiago de Cuba in July 1898
- Active: 1898
- Country: United States
- Branch: United States Army
- Type: Cavalry
- Role: Charge
- Size: 1,060 soldiers 1,258 horses
- Nickname: Rough Riders
- Engagements: Spanish–American War; Battle of Las Guasimas; Battle of San Juan Hill; Siege of Santiago

Commanders
- Notable commanders: Leonard Wood; Theodore Roosevelt

The Rough Riders was a nickname given to the 1st United States Volunteer Cavalry, one of three such regiments raised in 1898 for the Spanish–American War and the only one to see combat. The United States Army was small, understaffed, and disorganized in comparison to its status during the American Civil War roughly thirty years prior. Following the sinking of USS Maine, President William McKinley needed to muster a strong ground force swiftly, which he did by calling for 125,000 volunteers to assist in the war. The U.S. had gone to war in opposition to Spanish colonial policies in Cuba, which was then torn by a rebellion. The regiment was also nicknamed "Wood's Weary Walkers" for its first commander, Colonel Leonard Wood. This reflected their dissatisfaction that despite being cavalry, they ended up fighting in Cuba as light infantry, since their horses were not sent there with them.

Wood's second in command was former Assistant Secretary of the Navy Theodore Roosevelt, who later became president, a strong advocate for the Cuban War of Independence. When Wood was promoted to become commander of the 2nd Cavalry Brigade, the regiment became known as "Roosevelt's Rough Riders". That term was borrowed from Buffalo Bill, who called his traveling Western show "Buffalo Bill's Wild West and Congress of Rough Riders of the World."

The original plan called for the regiment to be composed of frontiersmen from the Indian Territory, the New Mexico Territory, the Arizona Territory, and the Oklahoma Territory. However, after Roosevelt joined the ranks, it attracted an odd mixture of Ivy League athletes, glee club singers, Texas Rangers, and Native Americans. All accepted into the regiment had to be skilled horsemen and eager to see combat. The Rough Riders would receive more publicity than any other Army unit in that war, and they are best remembered for their conduct during the Battle of San Juan Hill, though it is seldom mentioned how heavily they outnumbered the Spanish soldiers who opposed them. Several days after the Battle of San Juan Hill, the Spanish fleet sailed from Cuba, and in only a few weeks an armistice ending the fighting was signed. Despite the brevity of their service, the Rough Riders became legendary, thanks in large part to Roosevelt's writing his own history of the regiment and the silent film reenactments made years later.

== Early history ==
=== Formation ===
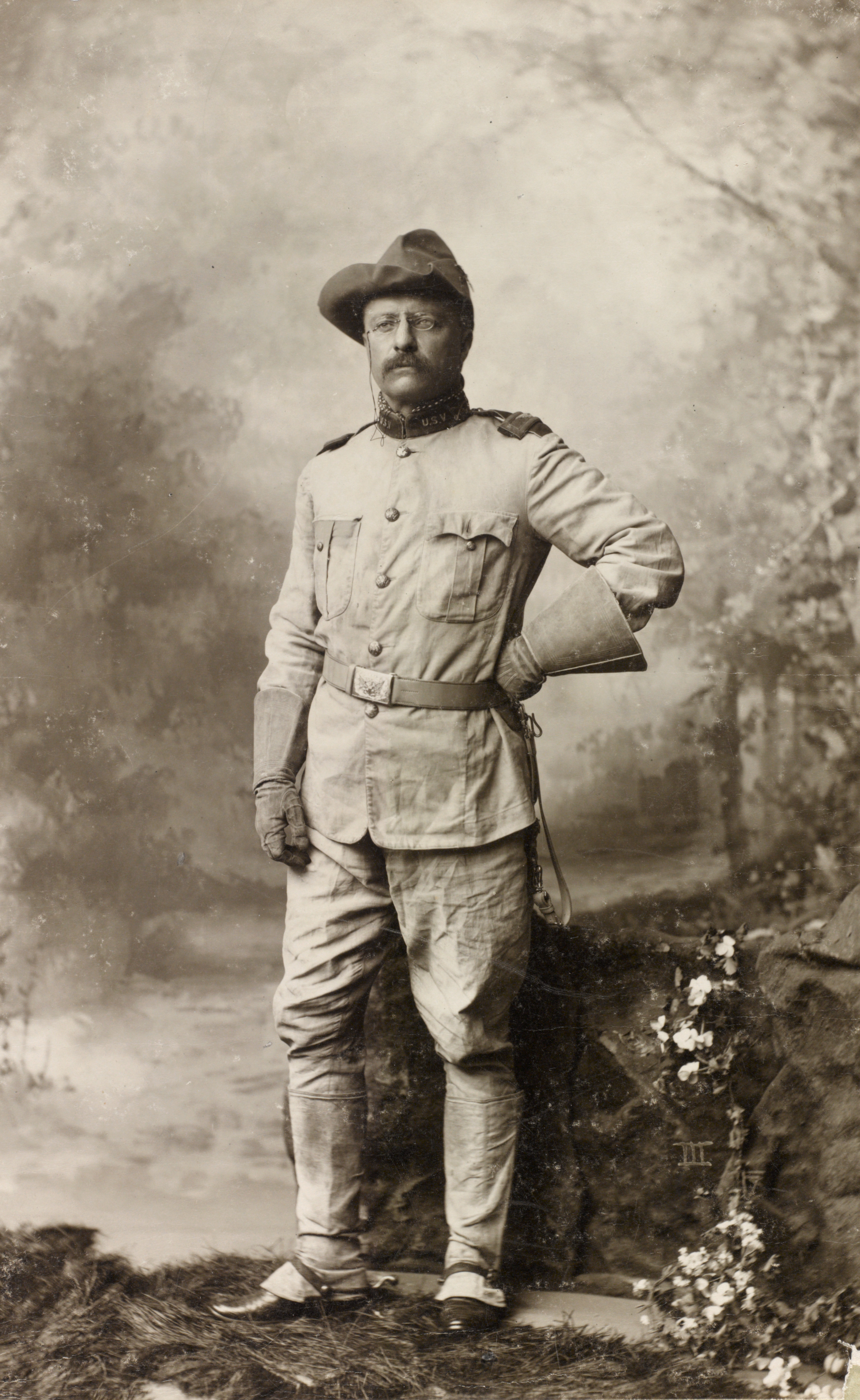
Colonel Theodore Roosevelt in his Rough Riders uniform on October 26, 1898, by Rockwood.

The volunteers were gathered in four areas: Arizona, New Mexico, Oklahoma, and Texas. They were gathered mainly from the southwest because the hot climate region that the men were used to was similar to that of Cuba where they would be fighting. "The difficulty in organizing was not in selecting, but in rejecting men." The allowed limit set for the volunteer cavalry men was promptly met. With news trickling down of Spanish aggression and the sinking of the USS Maine, men flocked from every corner of the regions to display their patriotism. They gathered a diverse bunch of men consisting of cowboys, gold or mining prospectors, hunters, gamblers, Native Americans, and college boys—all of whom were able-bodied and capable on horseback and in shooting. Half the unit would come from New Mexico according to Roosevelt. Among these men were also police officers and military veterans who wished to see action again, most of whom had already retired. Thirty years removed from any armed conflict, men who had served in the regular army during campaigns against Native Americans or during the Civil War sought out to serve as higher-ranking officers, since they already had the knowledge and experience to lead and train the men. The unit thus would not be without experience. Leonard Wood, an Army doctor who served as the medical adviser for both the President and Secretary of War, was appointed colonel of The Rough Riders, with Roosevelt serving as lieutenant colonel. One particularly famous spot where volunteers were gathered was in San Antonio, Texas, at the Menger Hotel Bar. The bar is still open and serves as a tribute to the Rough Riders, containing much of their and Theodore Roosevelt's uniforms and memories.

=== Equipment ===
Before training began, Lieutenant Colonel Roosevelt used his political influence as Assistant Secretary of the Navy to ensure that his volunteer regiment would be as properly equipped to serve as any regular Army unit. The Rough Riders were armed with Model 1896 Carbines in caliber .30 US (i.e., .30-40 Krag). "They succeeded in getting their cartridges, Colt Single Action Army revolvers, clothing, shelter-tents, and horse gear ... and in getting the regiment armed with the Springfield Krag carbine used by the regular cavalry." The Rough Riders also used Bowie knives. A last-minute gift from a wealthy donor were a pair of modern tripod mounted, gas-operated M1895 Colt–Browning machine guns in 7mm Mauser caliber.

In contrast, the uniforms of the regiment were designed to set the unit apart: "The Rough Rider uniform was a slouch hat, blue flannel shirt, brown trousers, leggings, and boots, with handkerchiefs knotted loosely around their necks. They looked exactly as a body of cowboy cavalry should look." This "rough and tumble" appearance contributed to earning them the title of "The Rough Riders."

=== Training ===
Training was very standard, even for a cavalry unit. They worked on basic military drills, protocol, and habits involving conduct, obedience, and etiquette to improve their overall physique and mental status. The men proved eager to learn what was necessary and the training went smoothly. It was decided that the men would not be trained to use the saber as cavalry often did, as they had no experience with it. Instead, they used their carbines and revolvers as primary and secondary weapons. Although the men, for the most part, were already experienced horsemen, the officers refined their techniques in riding, shooting from horseback, and practicing in formations and in skirmishes. Along with these practices, the high-ranking men heavily studied books filled with tactics and drills to better themselves in leading the others. During times which physical drills could not be run, either because of confinement on board the train, ship, or during times where space was inadequate, there were some books that were read further as to leave no time wasted in preparation for war. The competent training that the volunteer men received prepared them best as possible for their duty. Although training methods were standard, the mass mobilization of troops from diverse regions resulted in an exceptionally high death rate from disease, particularly typhoid fever. Of the 1,832 deaths attributed to disease, 1,590 were specifically caused by typhoid fever. Notably, a significant portion of these fatalities occurred at training sites in the southeastern United States.

== Spanish–American War ==
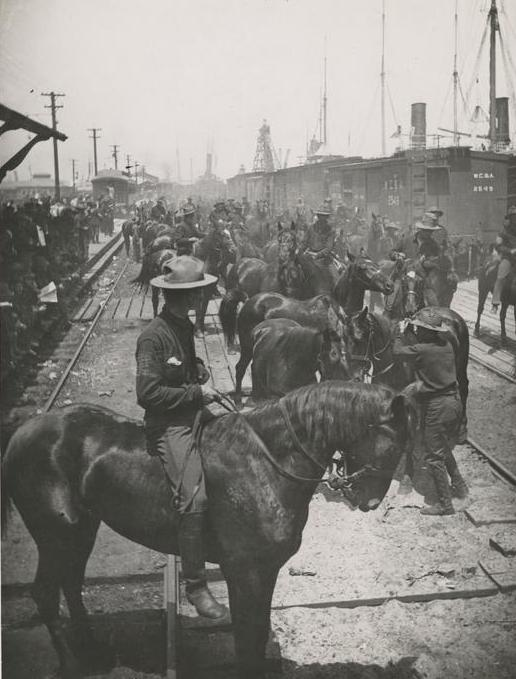
Troops arriving in Tampa

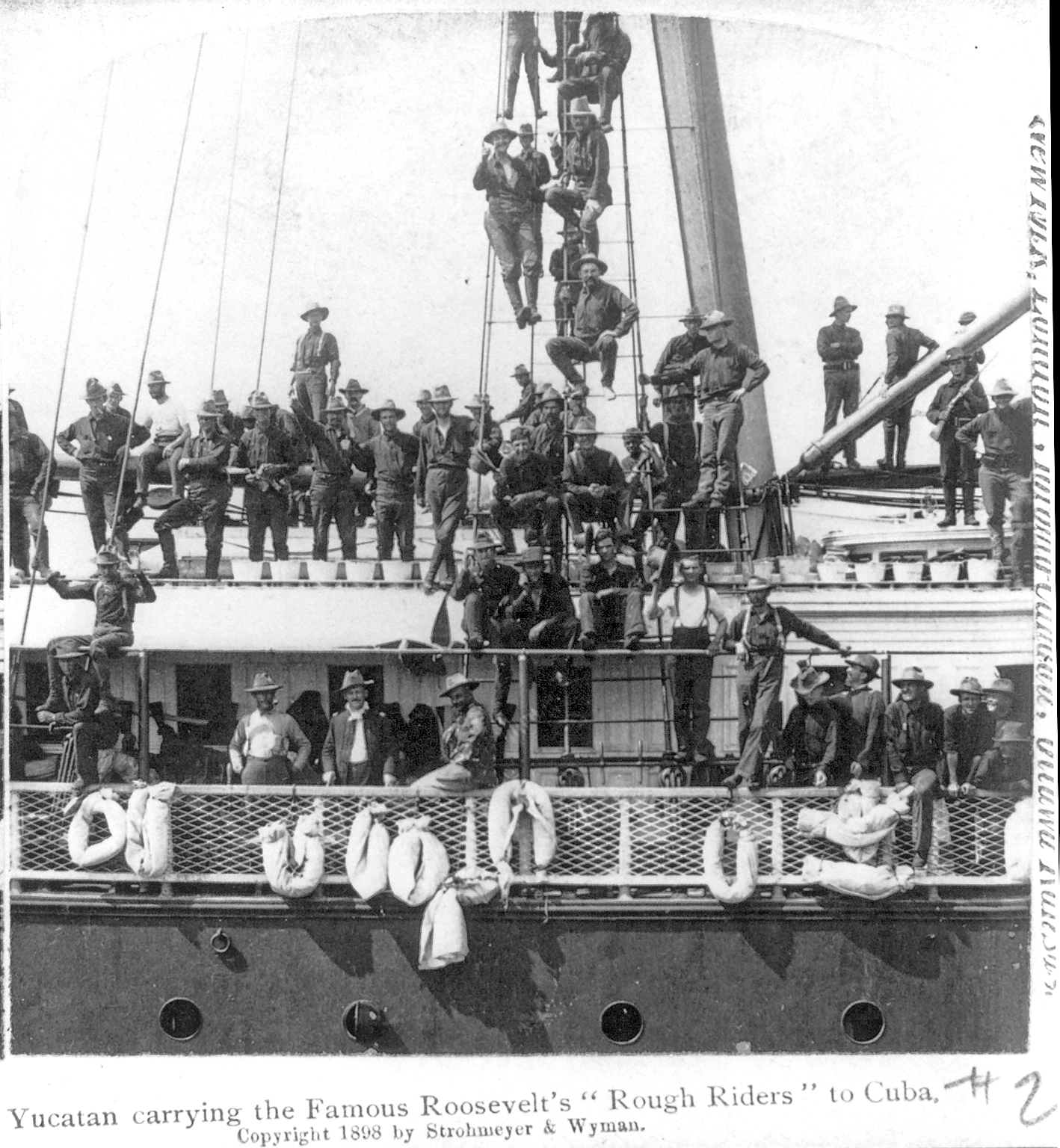
Rough Riders heading to Cuba aboard the steamship Yucatan.

=== Departure from the United States ===
On May 29, 1898, 1,060 Rough Riders and 1,258 of their horses and mules made their way to the Southern Pacific railroad to travel to Tampa, Florida, where they would set off for Cuba. The lot awaited orders for departure from Major General William Rufus Shafter. Under heavy prompting from Washington D.C., General Shafter gave the order to dispatch the troops early before sufficient traveling storage was available. Due to this problem, only eight of the 12 companies of The Rough Riders were permitted to leave Tampa to engage in the war, and many of the horses and mules were left behind. Aside from Lieutenant-Colonel Roosevelt's first-hand mention of deep, heartfelt sorrow from the men left behind, this situation resulted in a premature weakening of the men. Approximately one-fourth of them who received training had already been lost, most dying of malaria and yellow fever. This sent the remaining troops into Cuba with a significant loss in men and morale.

Upon arrival on Cuban shores on June 23, 1898, the men promptly unloaded themselves and the small amount of equipment they carried with them. Camp was set up nearby and the men were to remain there until further orders had been given to advance. Further supplies were unloaded from the ships over the next day including the very few horses that were allowed on the journey. "The great shortcoming throughout the campaign was the utterly inadequate transportation. If they had been allowed to take our mule-train, they could have kept the whole cavalry division supplied," Roosevelt later wrote. Each man was only able to carry a few days worth of food which had to last them longer and fuel their bodies for rigorous tasks. Even after only 75 percent of the total number of cavalrymen was allowed to embark into Cuba, they were still without most of the horses they had so heavily been trained and accustomed to using. They were not trained as infantry and were not conditioned to doing heavy marching, especially long-distance in hot, humid, and dense jungle conditions. This ultimately served as a severe disadvantage to the men who had yet to see combat.

=== Battle of Las Guasimas ===
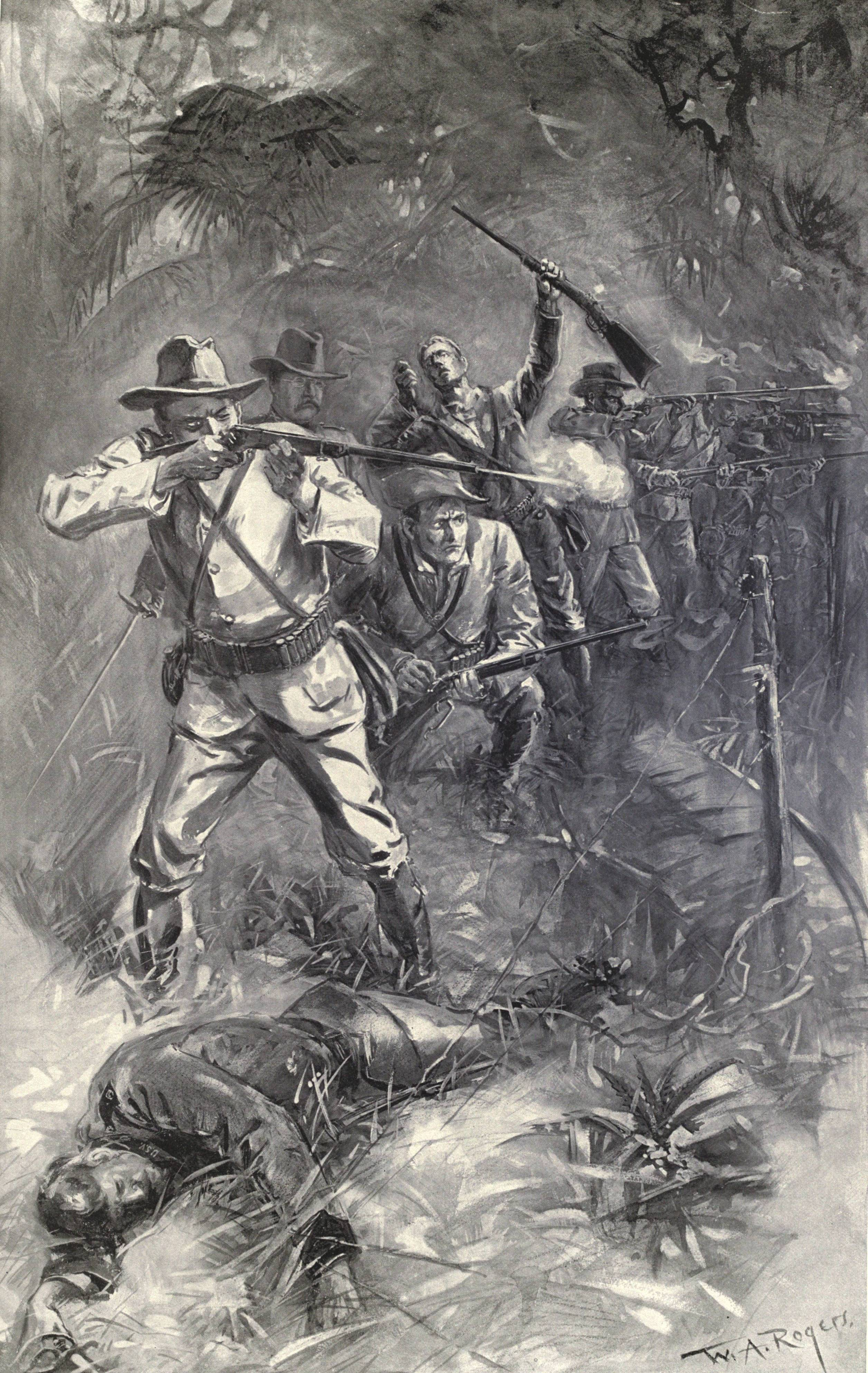
"The Battle of Las Guasimas, June 24 – The heroic stand of the 'Rough Riders'" in Harper's Pictorial History of the War with Spain.

Within another day of camp being established, men were sent forward into the jungle for reconnaissance purposes, and before too long they returned with news of a Spanish outpost, Las Guasimas. By afternoon, The Rough Riders were given the command to begin marching towards Las Guasimas, to eliminate opposition and secure the area which stood in the path of further military advance. Upon arrival at their relative destination, the men slept through the night in a crude encampment nearby the Spanish outpost they would attack early the next morning. The American side included the 1st U.S. Volunteer Cavalry, under Leonard Wood, the 1st U.S. Regular Cavalry, and the 10th U.S. Regular Cavalry (this consisted of Afro-American soldiers, then called Buffalo soldiers). Supported by artillery, the American forces numbered 964 men, supported by 800 men from Castillo.

The Spanish held an advantage over the Americans by knowing their way through the complicated trails in the area of combat. They predicted where the Americans would be traveling on foot and exactly what positions to fire on. They also were able to utilize the land and cover in such a way that they were difficult to spot. Along with this, their guns used smokeless powder which did not give away their immediate position upon firing as other gunpowders would have. This increased the difficulty of finding the opposition for the U.S. soldiers. In some locations, the jungle was too thick to see very far. Rough Riders on both left and right sides of the trail moved forward and eventually forced the Spaniards back to their second line of trenches. Continuing to advance, the Rough Riders eventually forced the Spanish to withdraw completely from their final positions. Rough Riders from A Troop on the far-right linked up with their regular counterparts and helped them seize the Spanish positions on the long finger-like hill to the right of the right road, with both Rough Riders and Regulars meeting at the base of the hill. By this time it was approximately 9:30 a.m. Reinforcements from the regular 9th Cavalry arrived 30 minutes after the fight.

General Young, who was in command of the regulars and cavalry, began the attack in the early morning. Using long-range, large-caliber Hotchkiss guns, he fired at the opposition, who were reportedly concealed along trenches, roads, bridges, and jungle cover. Colonel Wood's men, accompanied by Lieutenant-Colonel Roosevelt, were not yet in the same vicinity as the other men at the start of the battle. They had a more difficult path to travel around the time the battle began, and at first they had to make their way up a very steep hill. "Many of the men, footsore and weary from their march of the preceding day, found the pace up this hill too hard, and either dropped their bundles or fell out of line, with the result that we went into action with less than five hundred men." Lieutenant-Colonel Roosevelt became aware that there were countless opportunities for any man to fall out of formation and resign from battle without notice as the jungle was often too thick in places to see through. This was yet another event that left the group with fewer men than they had at the start.

Regardless, The Rough Riders pushed forward toward the outpost along with the regulars. Using careful observation, the officers were able to locate where the opposition was hidden in the brush and entrenchments and they were able to target their men properly to overcome them. Toward the end of the battle, Edward Marshall, a newspaper writer, was inspired by the men around him in the heat of battle to pick up a rifle and begin fighting alongside them. When he suffered a gunshot wound in the spine from one of the Spaniards, another soldier mistook him as Colonel Wood from afar and ran back from the front line to report his death. Due to this misconception, Roosevelt temporarily took command as colonel and gathered the troops together with his leadership charisma. The battle lasted an hour and a half from beginning to end with The Rough Riders suffering eight dead and 31 wounded, including Captain Allyn K. Capron Jr. Roosevelt came across Colonel Wood in full health after the battle finished and stepped down from his position to lieutenant-colonel.

The United States had full control of this Spanish outpost on the road to Santiago by the end of the battle. General Shafter had the men hold position for six days while additional supplies were brought ashore. During this time, The Rough Riders ate, slept, cared for the wounded, and buried the dead from both sides. During the six-day encampment, some men died from fever. Among those stricken by illness was General Joseph Wheeler. Brigadier General Samuel Sumner assumed command of the cavalry and Wood took the second brigade as brigadier general. This left Roosevelt as colonel of The Rough Riders.

=== Battle of San Juan Hill ===
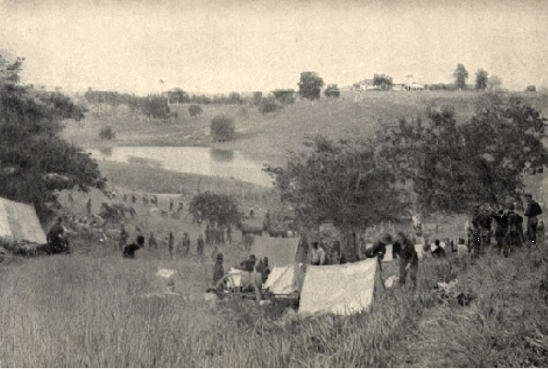
US Army encampment, 1st Volunteer Cavalry, Rough Riders, at the base of Kettle Hill about July 5, 1898. San Juan Hill and block houses are in background.

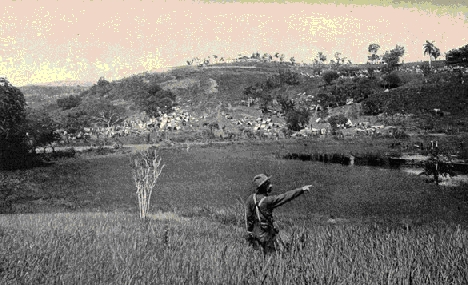
US Army photo taken near the base of Kettle Hill about July 4, 1898. The soldier is pointing up to the top of Kettle Hill. In the background are the block houses on San Juan Hill and the American encampment.

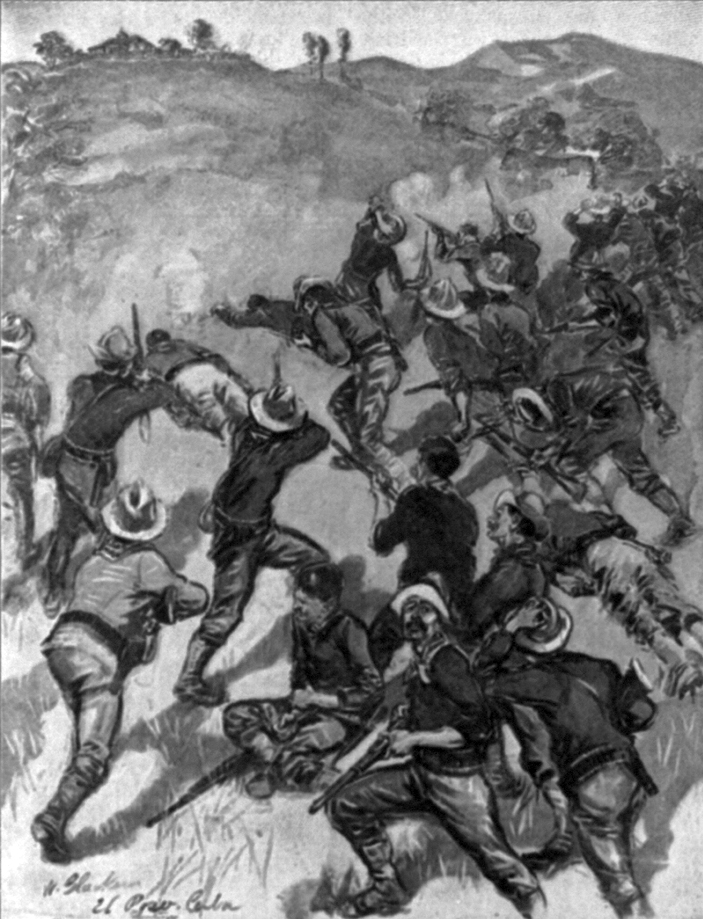
The Fight for Santiago. The "Rough Riders" charging up the San Juan Hill, July 1, and driving the Spanish from their intrenchments [sic]. Illustration from McClure's, October 1898

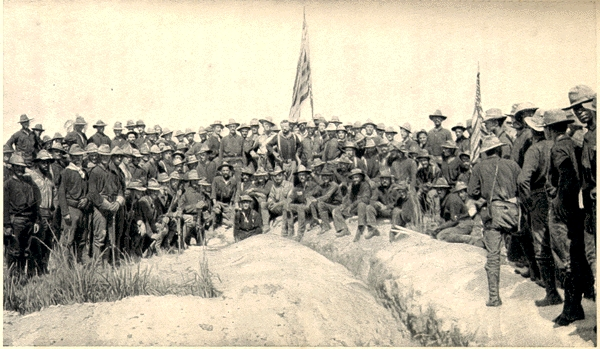
Original title: "Colonel Roosevelt and his Rough Riders at the top of the hill which they captured, Battle of San Juan Hill." US Army victors on Kettle Hill about July 3, 1898 after the battle of "San Juan Hill(s)." Left to right is 3rd US Cavalry, 1st Volunteer Cavalry (Col. Theodore Roosevelt center) and 10th US Cavalry. A second similar picture is often shown cropping out all but the 1st Vol Cav and TR.

The order was given for the men to march the eight miles (13 km) along the road to Santiago from the outpost they had been holding. Originally, Colonel Roosevelt had no specific orders for himself and his men. They were simply to march to the base of San Juan Heights, defended by over 1,000 Spanish soldiers, and keep the enemy occupied. This way the Spanish would be forced to hold their ground while being bombarded by American artillery. The main attack would be carried out by Brigadier General Henry Lawton's division against the Spanish stronghold El Caney a few miles away. The Rough Riders were to meet up with them mid-battle.

San Juan Hill and another hill were separated by a small valley and pond with the river near the foot of both. Together, this geography formed San Juan Heights. The battle of San Juan Heights began with an artillery barrage on the Spanish position. When the Spanish returned fire, the Rough Riders had to move promptly to avoid shells as they were occupying the same space as the friendly artillery. Colonel Roosevelt and his men made their way to the foot of what was dubbed Kettle Hill for the old sugar refinement cauldrons which lay along it. There they took cover along the riverbank and tall grass to avoid sniper and artillery fire, but they were left vulnerable and pinned down. The Spanish rifles were able to discharge eight rounds in the 20 seconds it took for the United States rifles to reload.

Theodore Roosevelt, deeply dissatisfied with General Shafter's lack of reconnaissance and failure to issue specific orders, became uneasy with the idea of his men being left sitting in the line of fire. He sent messengers to seek out one of the generals and coax orders from them to advance from their position. Finally, the Rough Riders received orders to assist the regulars in their assault on the hill's front. Roosevelt, riding on horseback, got his men onto their feet and into position to begin making their way up the hill. He later claimed that he wished to fight on foot as he did at Las Guasimas, but that would have made it too difficult to move up and down the hill to supervise his men effectively. He also recognized that he could see his men better from the elevated horseback, and they could see him better as well. Roosevelt chided his own men to not leave him alone in a charge up the hill, and drawing his sidearm, promised nearby black soldiers separated from their own units that he would fire at them if they turned back, warning them he kept his promises. His Rough Riders chanted (likely in jest): "Oh he always does, he always does!" The soldiers, laughing, fell in with the volunteers to prepare for the assault.

As the troops of the various units began slowly creeping up the hill, firing their rifles at the opposition as they climbed, Roosevelt went to the captain of the platoons in the back and had a word with him. He stated that it was his opinion that they could not effectively take the hill due to an insufficient ability to effectively return fire, and that the solution was to charge it full-on. The captain reiterated his colonel's orders to hold position. Roosevelt, recognizing the absence of the other colonel, declared himself the ranking officer and ordered a charge up Kettle Hill. The captain stood hesitant, and Colonel Roosevelt rode off on his horse, Texas, leading his own men uphill while waving his hat in the air and cheering. The Rough Riders followed him with enthusiasm and obedience without hesitation. By then, the other men from the different units on the hill became stirred by this event and began bolting up the hill alongside their countrymen. The 'charge' was actually a series of short rushes by mixed groups of regulars and Rough Riders. Within 20 minutes, Kettle Hill was taken, though casualties were heavy. The rest of San Juan Heights was taken within the following hour.

The Rough Riders' charge on Kettle Hill was facilitated by a hail of high caliber covering fire from three Gatling Guns commanded by Lt. John H. Parker, which fired some 18,000 .30 Army rounds into the Spanish trenches atop the crest of both hills. Col. Roosevelt noted that the hammering sound of the Gatling guns visibly raised the spirits of his men:

"There suddenly smote on our ears a peculiar drumming sound. One or two of the men cried out, 'The Spanish machine guns!' but, after listening a moment, I leaped to my feet and called, 'It's the Gatlings, men! Our Gatlings!' Immediately the troopers began to cheer lustily, for the sound was most inspiring."

Trooper Jesse D. Langdon of the 1st Volunteer Infantry, who accompanied Col. Theodore Roosevelt and the Rough Riders in their assault on Kettle Hill, reported:

"We were exposed to the Spanish fire, but there was very little because just before we started, why, the Gatling guns opened up at the bottom of the hill, and everybody yelled, 'The Gatlings! The Gatlings!' and away we went. The Gatlings just enfiladed the top of those trenches. We'd never have been able to take Kettle Hill if it hadn't been for Parker's Gatling guns."

A Spanish counterattack on Kettle Hill by some 600 infantry was quickly devastated by one of Lt. Parker's Gatling guns recently emplaced on the summit of San Juan Hill, which killed all but 40 of the attackers before they had closed to within 250 yards (230 m) of the Americans on Kettle Hill. Col. Roosevelt was so impressed by the actions of Lt. Parker and his men that he placed his regiment's two 7 mm Colt–Browning machine guns and the volunteers manning them under Parker, who immediately emplaced them—along with 10,000 rounds of captured 7 mm Mauser ammunition—at tactical firing points in the American line.

Colonel Roosevelt gave a large share of the credit for the successful charge to Lt. Parker and his Gatling Gun Detachment:

"I think Parker deserved rather more credit than any other one man in the entire campaign ... he had the rare good judgment and foresight to see the possibilities of the machine-guns..He then, by his own exertions, got it to the front and proved that it could do invaluable work on the field of battle, as much in attack as in defense."

America's conflict with Spain was later described as a "splendid little war" and for Theodore Roosevelt it certainly was. His combat experience consisted of one week's campaign with one day of hard fighting. "The charge itself was great fun", he declared, and "Oh, but we had a bully fight." His actions during the battle earned a recommendation for the Medal of Honor, but politics intervened and the request was denied. The rejection crushed Roosevelt, yet notability from the charge up San Juan Hill was instrumental in propelling him to the governorship of New York in 1899. The following year Roosevelt was selected to fill the vice presidential spot in President McKinley's successful run for a second term. With McKinley's assassination in September 1901, Roosevelt became president.

In the confusion surrounding their departure from Tampa, half the members of the Rough Riders were left behind along with most of the horses. The volunteers made the charge up San Juan Hill on foot. They were joined in the attack by the 10th (Negro) Cavalry. Though the 10th never received the glory for the charge that the Rough Riders did, one of their commanders—Captain "Black Jack" Pershing (who later commanded American troops in World War I)—was awarded the Silver Star.

=== Siege of Santiago ===
The Rough Riders played a key role in the outcome of the Spanish–American War by assisting the American forces in forming a constricting ring around the city of Santiago de Cuba. The ultimate goal of the Americans in capturing the San Juan Heights (also known as Kettle Hill and San Juan Hill) was to attain a strategic position from which to move downhill and attack Santiago, a strong point for the Spanish military. The Spanish had a fleet of cruisers in port. The United States drove the Spanish cruisers out of their port by taking areas around Santiago and subsequently moving in on the city from multiple directions. Two days after the battle on San Juan Heights, the US navy destroyed Spain's Caribbean cruiser fleet at Santiago Bay. This took a tremendous toll on the Spanish military due to their widespread empire and heavy reliance upon naval capabilities.

The primary objective of the American Fifth Army Corps' invasion of Cuba was the capture of the city of Santiago de Cuba. U.S. forces had driven back the Spaniards' first line of defense at the Battle of Las Guasimas, after which General Arsenio Linares pulled his troops back to the main line of defense against Santiago along San Juan Heights. In the charge at the Battle of San Juan Hill U.S. forces captured the Spanish position. At the Battle of El Caney the same day, U.S. forces took the fortified Spanish position and were then able to extend the U.S. flank on San Juan Hill. The destruction of the Spanish fleet at the Battle of Santiago de Cuba allowed U.S. forces to safely besiege the city.

However, the sinking of the Spanish cruisers did not mean the end of the war. Battles continued in and around Santiago. On July 16, after both governments agreed to the terms of capitulation ("surrender" was avoided), in which Toral surrendered his garrison and all troops in the Division of Santiago, an additional 9,000 soldiers. The Spanish also ceded Guantanamo City and San Luis. The Spanish troops marched out of Santiago on July 17. By July 17, 1898, the Spanish forces in Santiago surrendered to General Shafter and the United States military. Various battles in the region continued on and the United States was continuously victorious. On August 12, 1898, the Spanish Government surrendered to the United States and agreed to an armistice that relinquished their control of Cuba. The armistice also gained the United States the territories of Puerto Rico, Guam, and the Philippines. This large acquisition of land elevated the United States to the level of an imperial power. The Spanish–American War also began a trend of United States intervention in foreign affairs which has lasted to the present day.

== Aftermath ==
=== Return home ===
On August 14, the Rough Riders landed at Montauk Point on Long Island, New York. There, they met up with the other four companies that had been left behind in Tampa. Colonel Roosevelt made note of how very many of the men who were left behind felt guilty for not serving in Cuba with the others. However, he also stated that "those who stayed had done their duty precisely as did those who went, for the question of glory was not to be considered in comparison to the faithful performance of whatever was ordered." During the first portion of the month that the men stayed in Montauk, they received hospital care, especially from nurses like Sister Regina Purtell, who was so competent and beloved by the men that she became friends with Teddy Roosevelt and later cared for him personally when he was hospitalized. Many of the men were stricken with malarial fever (described at the time as "Cuban fever") and died in Cuba, while some were brought back to the United States on board the ship in makeshift quarantine. "One of the distressing features of the Malaria which had been ravaging the troops was that it was recurrent and persistent. Some of the men died after reaching home, and many were very sick." Aside from malaria, there were cases of yellow fever, dysentery, and other illnesses. Many of the men suffered from general exhaustion and were in poor condition upon returning home, some 20 pounds lighter. Everyone received fresh food and most were nourished back to their normal health.

The rest of the month in Camp Wikoff, was spent in celebration of victory among the troops. The regiment was presented with three different mascots that represented the Rough Riders: a mountain lion by the name of Josephine that was brought to Tampa by some troops from Arizona, a war eagle named in Colonel Roosevelt's honor brought in by some New Mexican troops, and lastly a small dog by the name of Cuba who had been brought along on the journey overseas. Accompanying the presented mascots was a young boy who had stowed away on the ship before it embarked to Cuba. He was discovered with a rifle and boxes of ammunition and was, of course, sent ashore before departure from the United States. He was taken in by the regiment that was left behind, given a small Rough Riders uniform, and made an honorary member. The men also made sure to honor their colonel in return for his stellar leadership and service. They presented him with a small bronze statue of Remington's "Bronco Buster" which portrayed a cowboy riding a violently bucking horse. "There could have been no more appropriate gift from such a regiment ... most of them looked upon the bronze with the critical eyes of professionals. I doubt if there was any regiment in the world which contained so large a number of men able to ride the wildest and most dangerous horses." After the turning over of their gift, each and every man in the regiment walked by and shook Colonel Roosevelt's hand and bid him a good-bye.

=== Disbandment ===
On the morning of September 15, 1898, the regimental property including all equipment, firearms and horses were turned back over to the United States government. The soldiers said one last good-bye to each other and the United States First Volunteer Cavalry, Roosevelt's Rough Riders, was disbanded. Before they returned to their homes across the country, Colonel Roosevelt gave them a short speech commending their efforts, expressing his profound pride, and reminding them that although heroes, they would have to integrate back into normal society and work as hard as everyone else. Many of the men were unable to regain the jobs they had before leaving to join the war. Some, due to illness or injury, were unable to work. A number of wealthier supporters donated money to help the needy veterans, though many were too proud to accept.

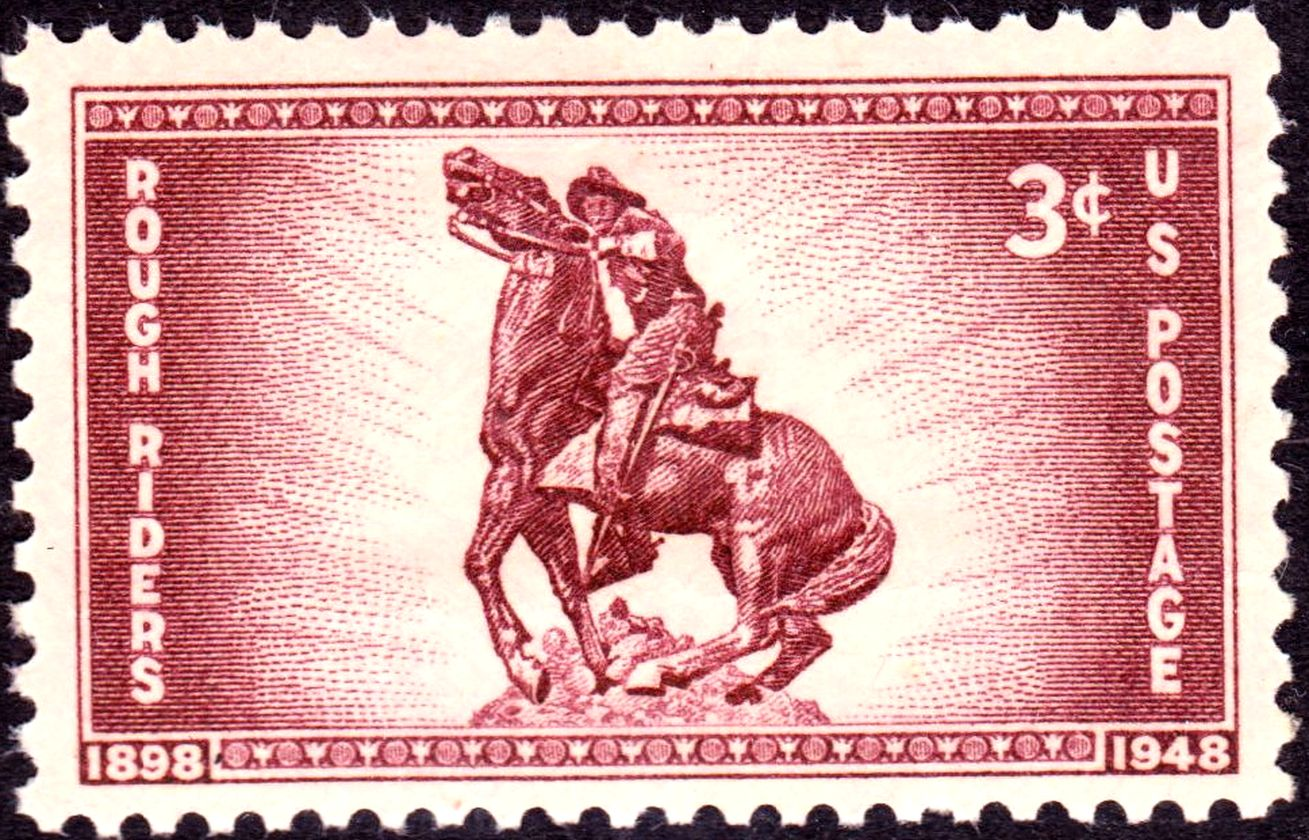
US Postage Stamp, 1948 issue, commemorating 50th anniversary of Theodore Roosevelt's Rough Riders.

A first reunion of the Rough Riders was held in the Plaza Hotel in Las Vegas, New Mexico, in 1899. Roosevelt, then Governor of New York, attended this event. Of the contributions of the New Mexicans and Southwesterners to the Rough Riders, Roosevelt said;

The majority of you Rough Riders came from the Southwest. I shall ever keep in mind the valor you showed as you charged up the slope of San Juan Hill. I owe you men... . If New Mexico wants to be a state, I will go down to Washington to speak for her and do anything I can.

Roosevelt would go on to be a strong proponent for Oklahoma, New Mexico, and Arizona's statehood during his time in the Oval Office, even making it a plank of the 1900 Republican party platform.

In 1948, 50 years after the Rough Riders disbandment, the U.S. Post office issued a commemorative stamp in their honor and memory. The stamp depicts Captain William Owen "Buckey" O'Neill, who was killed in action while leading troop A at the Battle of San Juan Hill, July 1, 1898. The Rough Riders continued to have annual reunions in Las Vegas until 1967, when the sole veteran to attend was Jesse Langdon. He died in 1975.

== Last survivors ==
The last three surviving veterans of the regiment were Frank C. Brito, Jesse Langdon, and Ralph Waldo Taylor.

Brito was from Las Cruces, New Mexico. His father was a Yaqui Indian stagecoach operator. Brito was 21 when he enlisted with his brother in May 1898. He never made it to Cuba, having been a member of H Troop, one of the four left behind in Tampa. He later became a mining engineer and lawman. He died on 22 April 1973, at the age of 96.

Langdon, born in 1881 in what is now North Dakota, "hoboed" his way to Washington, D.C., and called on Roosevelt at the Navy Department, reminding him that his father, a veterinarian, had treated Roosevelt's cattle at his Dakota ranch during his ranching days. Roosevelt arranged a railroad ticket for him to San Antonio, where Langdon enlisted in the Rough Riders at age 16. He was the penultimate surviving member of the regiment and the only one to attend the final two reunions, in 1967 and 1968. He died on 29 June 1975, at the age of 94, 26 months after Brito.

Taylor was just 16 years old in 1898 when he lied about his age to enlist in the New York National Guard, serving in Company K of the 71st Infantry Regiment. He died on 15 May 1987, at the age of 105.

== World War I ==
Just after the United States entered the war against the Central Powers, the U.S. Congress gave Roosevelt the authority to raise up to four divisions similar to the Rough Riders. In his book Foes of Our Own Household (1917), Theodore Roosevelt explains that he had authorization from Congress to raise four divisions to fight in France, similar to his earlier Rough Riders, the 1st United States Volunteer Cavalry Regiment and to the British Army 25th (Frontiersmen) Battalion, Royal Fusiliers. He had selected 18 officers (including Seth Bullock, Frederick Russell Burnham, James Rudolph Garfield, John M. Parker, and Henry L. Stimson) and directed them to actively recruit volunteer troops shortly after the United States entered the war. With the help of John Hays Hammond, the New York-based Rocky Mountain Club enlisted Major Burnham to raise the troops in the Western states and to coordinate recruitment efforts. President Woodrow Wilson ultimately rejected Roosevelt's plan, refused to make use of the volunteers, and Roosevelt disbanded the unit.

Outside the volunteer division, one of Roosevelt's most trusted officers from the Rough Riders, Brigadier General John Campbell Greenway, served in the 101st Infantry Regiment. Greenway, a colonel at the time, was especially praised for his heroic conduct in battle and was cited for bravery at Cambrai. France awarded him the Croix de Guerre, the Legion of Honor, and the Ordre de l'Étoile Noire for commanding the 101st Infantry Regiment during the Meuse-Argonne Offensive. He also received a Distinguished Service Cross.

== Muster roll ==
Ticket for a 1906 fund-raising event to help finance a monument for the Rough Riders erected later in 1906

- Mustered In:

Officers: 56
Enlisted Men: 994

- Mustered Out:

Officers: 76
Enlisted Men: 1,090

- Total Number Accounted for on Muster Out Roll:

Officers: 52
Enlisted Men: 1,185

- Losses While in Service:

- Officers:

Promoted or Transferred: 0
Resigned or Discharged: 2
Dismissed: 0
Killed in Action: 2
Died of Wounds: 0
Died of Disease: 1
Died of Accident: 0
Drowned: 0
Suicide: 0
Murdered: 0
Total Officer losses: 5

- Enlisted Men:

Transferred: 0
Discharged for Disability: 9
Discharged by General Court Martial: 0
Discharged by Order: 31
Killed in Action: 21
Died of Wounds Received in Action: 3
Died of Disease: 19
Died of Accident: 0
Drowned: 0
Suicide: 14
Murdered or Homicide: 0
Deserted: 12
Total enlisted Losses: 95

- Wounded:

Officers: 7
Enlisted Men: 97

- (Source: The Adjutant General's Office, Statistical Exhibit of Strength of Volunteer Forces Called Into Service During the War With Spain; with Losses From All Causes. (Washington: Government Printing Office, 1899) As presented in an Electronic Edition by the US Army Center of Military History)

== In popular culture ==
=== Theatrical productions ===
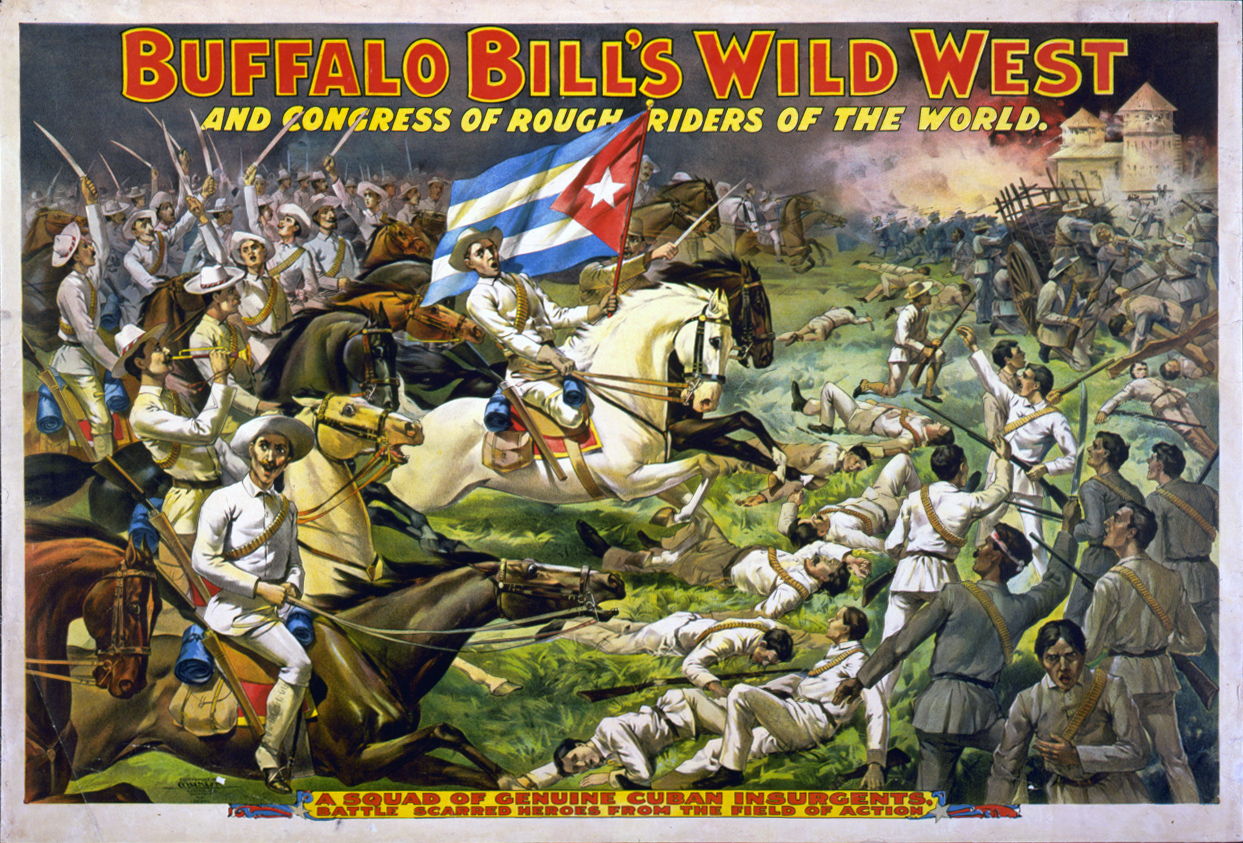
Buffalo Bill's Wild West and Congress of Rough Riders of the World, c. 1898

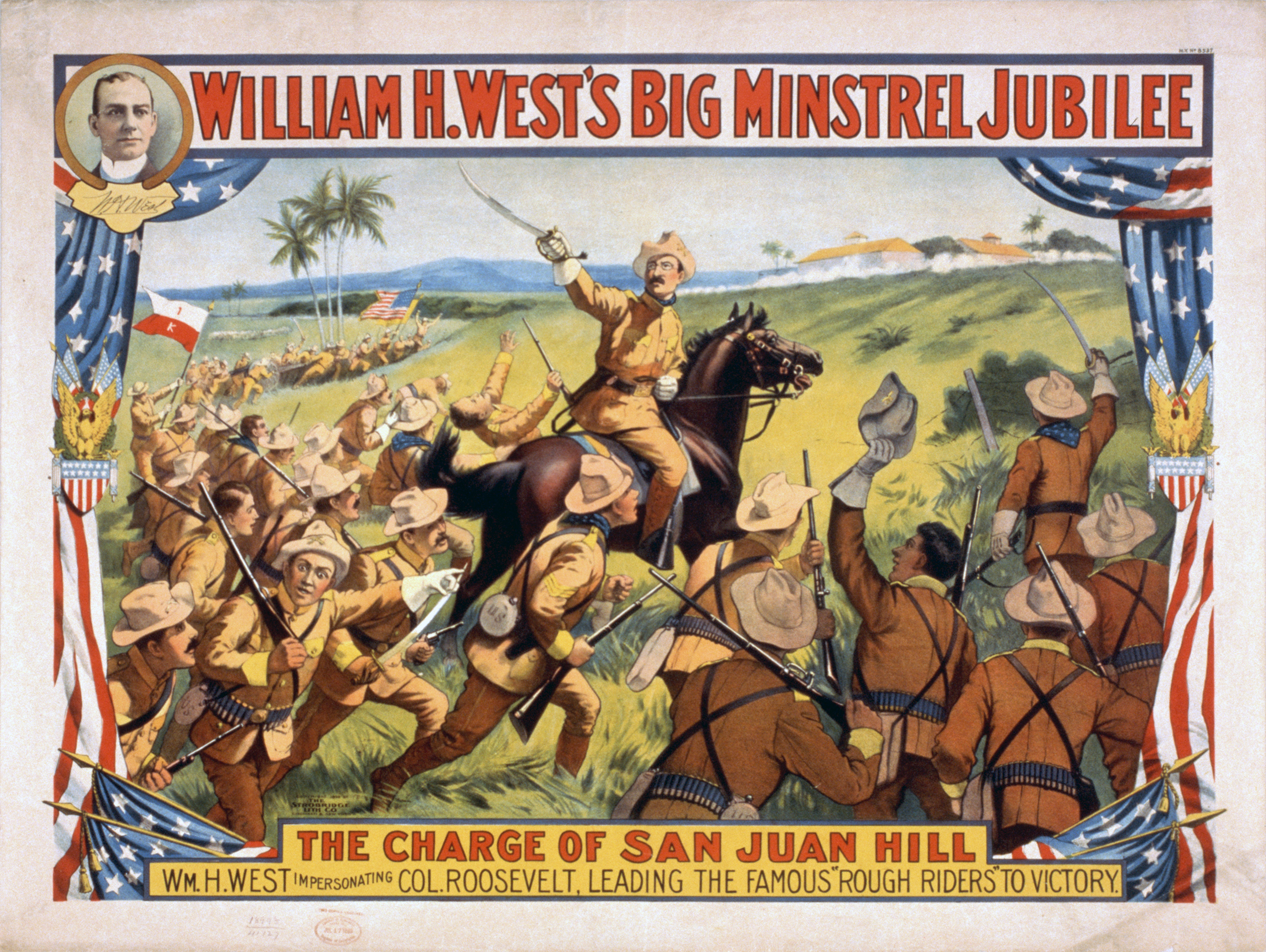
William H. West's Big Minstrel Jubilee: The Charge of San Juan Hill

Colonel Theodore Roosevelt and the Rough Riders were popularly portrayed in Wild West shows such as Buffalo Bill's Wild West and Congress of Rough Riders of the World and in minstrel shows such as William H. West's Big Minstrel Jubilee. Roosevelt himself had a hand in popularizing the legends of the Rough Riders, recruiting Mason Mitchell, a fellow Rough Rider with theatrical talent, to perform for the Republican State Committee of New York. More than anyone else, William Frederick Cody, better known as Buffalo Bill, can be credited with helping to create and preserve the dramatic myth of the Rough Riders and the American Old West. His extravaganzas glamorized it into an appealing show for eastern American audiences and helped permanently preserve the legends. The 'cult' of the cowboy was born, for Roosevelt, the vigorous, unbridled life of the Western cowboy was the perfect antidote to the softness of comfortable city living.

=== Tabletop Games ===
The miniatures game Warhammer 40,000 has a regiment of the Imperial Guard, the Imperium of Man's main military, bearing the name of Attilan Rough Riders, that specializes in cavalry.

=== Television ===
In 1997, the miniseries Rough Riders aired on TNT over two consecutive nights. The series was directed by John Milius and centered primarily on the Battle of San Juan Hill.

In the comedy-drama television series M*A*S*H, Colonel Sherman Potter claims to have ridden with Theodore Roosevelt at the age of 15.

In the Western television series The Virginian, Trampas and Steve and the Virginian (ultimately) join the Rough Riders and fight in Cuba.

=== Movies ===
The Rough Riders is a silent film released in 1927 and directed by Victor Fleming.

=== Video Games ===
The Rough Riders are featured as a unique unit for the American civilization in Civilization VI.

== Tribute organizations ==
Tampa Tampa Rough Riders was created to perpetuate a living memorial to the unique accomplishments of President Theodore Roosevelt and the members of the 1st US Volunteer Cavalry Regiment, known as the Rough Riders.

=== School mascot ===
Many schools named after Theodore Roosevelt have the Rough Riders (or Roughriders) as their mascot. Examples include:

- Roosevelt Military Academy (Aledo, Illinois, 1931-1973)
- Catasauqua High School (Northampton, Pennsylvania)
- Memorial High School (St. Marys, Ohio)
- Red River High School (Grand Forks, North Dakota)
- Roosevelt Elementary School (Tampa, Florida)
- Roosevelt High School (Oregon)
- Roosevelt High School (South Dakota)
- Roosevelt High School (Washington)
- Theodore Roosevelt High School (Fresno, California)
- Theodore Roosevelt High School (Kent, Ohio)
- Theodore Roosevelt High School (Los Angeles)
- Theodore Roosevelt High School (San Antonio)

== See also ==
- Canyon Diablo Train Robbery
- Battleground Gunfight
- Rough Riders Memorial

Notable members

- Leonard Wood
- Theodore Roosevelt
- Woodbury Kane
- Hamilton Fish II (Rough Rider)
- John Campbell Greenway
- Dudley Dean
- Robert Wrenn
- Craig Wadsworth
- Henry Nash
- John Avery McIlhenny
- Frank Knox
- Andrew Jackson Houston
- Charles Belknap Henderson
