= John C. Shields =

American jurist (1848–1892)

Chief Justice, Arizona Territorial Supreme Court
- In office November 9, 1885 – June 7, 1886
- Nominated by: Grover Cleveland
- Preceded by: Sumner Howard
- Succeeded by: James Henry Wright

Personal details
- Born: January 21, 1848 Livingston County, Michigan
- Died: April 30, 1892 (aged 44) Fowlerville, Michigan
- Party: Democratic
- Spouse: Nellie Stanbaugh (m. 1875)
- Profession: Attorney

John Calhoun Shields (January 21, 1848 – April 30, 1892) was an American jurist who served as Chief Justice of the Arizona Territorial Supreme Court. Granted a recess appointment by President Grover Cleveland, he is the only nominee to the Arizona territorial bench who was denied senate confirmation.

== Early life and education ==
Shields was born on January 21, 1848, to John and Elizabeth (McCabe) Shields in Livingston County, Michigan. Both of his parents were Irish immigrants. He was educated in public schools and graduated from normal school at age 17. For the next four years, Shields taught at a school. In 1869, he was admitted to the Michigan bar. He then enrolled at the University of Michigan and graduated with a law degree in 1872.

Following graduation, Shields practiced law with his brother, Dennis, in Howell. He moved to Lansing in late 1874 or early 1875. In 1875, Shields married Nellie Stanbaugh. Shields moved to Alpena and formed a partnership with J. T. Turnbull in 1885.

== Chief Justice ==
The post of Chief Justice of the Arizona Territorial Supreme Court was filled in March 1884 by Sumner Howard, an appointee of President Chester A. Arthur. With the election of President Grover Cleveland, Howard sensed he was about to be removed and resigned in October 1885 to ease the appointment of Shields to the Arizona bench. On October 23, 1885, President Cleveland appointed Shields as Chief Justice of the Arizona Territorial Supreme Court. One of the most intellectual men to preside on the territorial bench, Shields took his oath of office on November 9, 1885, in Prescott, Arizona Territory. There was a district court session already in progress when the new justice took office, and a session of the territorial supreme court scheduled for January. Shortly after his arrival, Shields requested a leave of absence following the January session to "close up my business" back in Michigan.

The Arizona Reports lists eight opinions authored by Shields. Several had only short term importance such as a procedural matter in Soloman v. Norton, 2 Arizona 100 (1886), a mortgage foreclosure case, Asher v. Cox, 2 Arizona 71 (1886), or Mooney v. Broadway, 2 Arizona 107, which allowed the plaintiff to collect a debt from the Maricopa County sheriff after it was determined the original payment had been lost due to "negligent acts and omissions" by the officer. Territory of Arizona v. Davis, 2 Arizona 59 (1886), ordered a new trial for a convicted murderer due to evidence being excluded in the original trial. Waller v. Hughes, 2 Arizona 114 (1886), dealt with a man who felt he should not have to pay taxes on a mine because the federal government had not provided him with a patent to the mining claim. Shields found that the payment of taxes by the owner, and acceptance of the payment by the government, established title to the property in the absence of the patent. The Chief Justice's ruling in Jeffords v. Hines, 2 Arizona 162 (1886), along with its twin case, United States v. Tenney and Christofferson, 2 Arizona 127 (1886), attracted considerable attention by upholding convictions under the Edmunds Act of Mormons who practiced polygamy.

Shields' time on the bench ended on June 7, 1886, when the United States Senate refused to confirm his nomination. The nomination had run into problems due to senatorial courtesy, with Senator Omar D. Conger of Michigan blocking it. The rejection was denounced by a variety of sources, with Senator Richard Coke of Texas saying, "I do not believe he has had proper treatment before the Senate" and calling for the nomination to be resubmitted because Shields had no opportunity to respond to "vague and indefinite allegations made against him evidently by personal enemies". The nominee blamed the rejection upon "a senator from Michigan opposed to me simply and only on political grounds, and that under the 'courtesy of the senate' left the whole matter in his hands". President Cleveland resubmitted the nomination on July 1. The matter was referred to the Judiciary committee but no further actions were taken.

== Later life ==
After leaving the bench, Shields returned to his private legal practice in Alpena, Michigan. While his health was not good during his time in Arizona, it began to decline further upon his return home. During the winter of 1891–2, he suffered a stroke and a severe bout of grippe. The stroke left his paralyzed. His final months were spent in the care of his sister in Fowlerville, where he died on April 30, 1892. He was buried in Lansing's St. Mary's Cemetery (now St. Joseph's Cemetery).
