= Marlin Kuykendall =

American politician (1934–2021)

Mayor of Prescott, Arizona
- In office November 2009 – November 2015
- Preceded by: Jack Wilson
- Succeeded by: Harry Oberg

Personal details
- Born: 1934 or 1935
- Died: January 17, 2021 (aged 86) Prescott, Arizona, US
- Spouse: Tana Kuykendall
- Profession: Politician

Marlin Kuykendall (1934/35 – January 17, 2021) was a mayor of Prescott, Arizona.

== Personal ==
Kuykendall was married to Tana, and has three sons.

On November 11, 2010, while waiting to judge a parade, Kuykendall suffered a heart attack but later recovered. He died on January 17, 2021, from cancer.

== Business Experience ==
Kuykendall opened the town's first Toyota dealership and later acquired the Buick Pontiac and GMC franchises there as well. He also built the Antelope Hills Inn, and ran it himself until 2007.

== Military service ==
Kuykendall enlisted in the Arizona Army National Guard in 1953 and was put on active duty with the U.S. Army in 1956. Kuykendall served 3 years before returning to the National Guard, where he was made the Prescott Unit's Commanding Officer in 1959. He later served as Tactical Officer of the Arizona Military Academy, as an aide-de-camp to the Commanding General of the Arizona Army National Guard, and as Northern Arizona Chair of the Defense Department's Employer Support of the Guard and Reserve (ESGR), and escorted civilian VIPs on fact-finding tours across several continents.

== Politics ==
Kuykendall was elected to the Prescott City Council in 1971 and was appointed to the council in 1991 to fulfill the remainder of an unexpired term due to a councilor's death.

Kuykendall won the mayoral primary election in September 2009 against incumbent mayor Jack Wilson. Kuykendall won 7,365 votes to Wilson's 2,662 votes.

Kuykendall won re-election in 2011 against challengers Mary Ann Suttles and Deborah Thurston.

He won a third term in 2013 in a race against Bill Lindsay. He did not seek re-election in 2015 and was succeeded as mayor by Harry Oberg.

== See also ==
- List of mayors of Prescott, Arizona
