= Antero Rubín =

Spanish general (1851–1935)

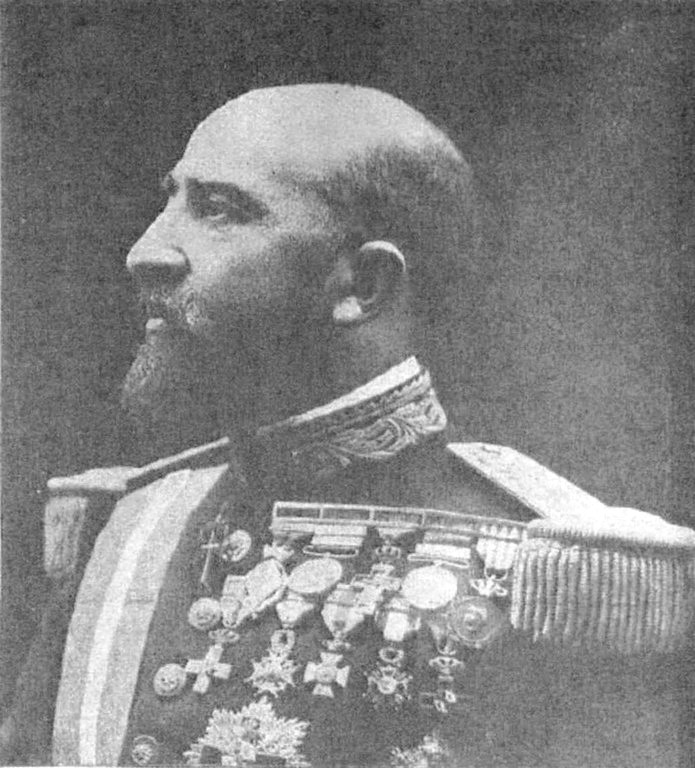
- Born: February 15, 1851; Redondela, Province of Pontevedra, Spain
- Died: May 1, 1935 (aged 84); Ourense, Province of Ourense, Spain
- Military career
- Allegiance: Spain
- Branch: Spanish Army
- Service years: 1868–1923
- Rank: Teniente general
- Conflicts: Ten Years' War; Spanish–American War

Antero Rubín Homent (February 15, 1851 – May 1, 1935) was a Spanish general and politician noted for his long service in Cuba. He fought in the Spanish–American War, served in the Cortes Generales, and spent the final years of his life as senator for the province of Zamora.

Rubín's father, a career officer who served with distinction under General Prim in the 1860 war against Morocco, steered Rubín toward a military career. Rubín enrolled in the Spanish Army May 11, 1868, and in 1869, at the age of 16, volunteered for service in Cuba. Rubín returned home shortly afterwards with his statutory promotion to lieutenant and began his studies at Vigo, Pontevedra and Santiago de Compostela.

In 1869 Rubín, a captain, embarked once more for Cuba. He prosecuted several campaigns against the Cuban insurgency, marked by successes at Estella and Somorrostro.

On February 4, 1898, Rubín was promoted to brigadier general of the Regimento de María Cristina. He conducted himself well at the Battle of Las Guasimas, where his small force fought a very successful rearguard operation, bloodying Joseph Wheeler's V Corps before retiring in good order to Santiago de Cuba. This city was put under siege after a bloody struggle at San Juan Hill and on July 18 General José Toral y Velázquez reached an agreement with the Americans and capitulated.

Rubín was one of the few Spanish commanders not discredited by the war. He reached the rank of lieutenant general in 1908 and became captain general of Galicia in 1917 and retired on 1923. An avenue in Pontevedra bears his name.
