= List of mayors of Prescott, Arizona =

The following is a list of mayors of the city of Prescott, Arizona, United States.

- Morris Goldwater, ca.1879
- Michael Goldwater, ca.1885
- Sumner Howard, ca.1887
- J.L. Fisher, ca.1893
- Buckey O'Neill, 1897–1898
- F.E. Andrews, ca.1899
- Joe L. Allen, ca.1952–1954
- Elbert W. Schoneberger, ca.1955–1956
- Ralph Watson, ca.1957
- William J. Cline Jr., ca.1958
- Ray Vyne, ca.1959–1960
- Howard D. Jorgenson, ca.1967
- Sam Steiger, 1999–2001
- Rowle Simmons, ca. 2002–2003
- Jack Wilson, ca.2007–2009
- Marlin Kuykendall, 2009–2015
- Harry Oberg, ca.2015-2017
- Greg Mengarelli, ca.2018–2020
- Phil Goode, ca.2021–2024

== See also ==
- Prescott history
