= Henry C. Gooding =

American jurist (1838–1913)

Chief Justice, Arizona Territorial Supreme Court
- In office May 7, 1890 – May 24, 1893
- Nominated by: Benjamin Harrison
- Preceded by: James Henry Wright
- Succeeded by: Albert C. Baker

Personal details
- Born: June 14, 1838 Greenfield, Indiana
- Died: September 14, 1913 (aged 75) Los Angeles, California
- Party: Republican
- Spouse: Mary Viele Babcock (m. 1871)
- Profession: Attorney

Military service
- Allegiance: United States Union
- Branch/service: Union Army
- Rank: First Lieutenant
- Unit: 122nd Illinois Volunteer Infantry Regiment
- Battles/wars: American Civil War

Henry Clay Gooding (June 14, 1838 – September 13, 1913) was an American jurist who served as Chief Justice on the Arizona Territorial Supreme Court from 1890 till 1893.

== Biography ==
Gooding was born to Asa and Matilda (Hunt) Gooding in Greenfield, Indiana on June 14, 1838. He was educated in local schools and graduated from Indiana Asbury University (now DePauw University) in 1859. As a university student he was a member of Beta Theta Pi. After college, Gooding worked briefly as a teacher in Macon, Tennessee and Vicksburg, Mississippi. Seeing that conflict was coming, he returned north and was reading law and working as a school principal in Carlinville, Illinois when the American Civil War began.

Following the outbreak of hostilities, Gooding enlisted in the 122nd Illinois Volunteer Infantry Regiment. In addition to combat service, he was for a time acting judge advocate for the western Kentucky military district. By the end of the war, Gooding had risen to the rank of first lieutenant.

After the war, Gooding worked as an attorney in Washington D.C. before moving to Evansville, Indiana in 1868. There he quickly became involved in Republican politics. In 1870, Gooding was his party's nominee for Indiana's 1st congressional district. While he lost the race, he won acclaim for his performance in a series of debates with the incumbent candidate. Between 1872 and 1875 he served two terms in the Indiana Senate. Fraternally, Gooding was a Mason and member of the Knights Templar. He was also active in veteran concerns, being a member of the Military Order of the Loyal Legion of the United States and serving as commander of his local Grand Army of the Republic post. Gooding married Mary Viele Babcock on February 15, 1871. The couple had two children: Gertie and Clay.

President Benjamin Harrison nominated Gooding to become Chief Justice of the Arizona Territorial Supreme Court on March 13, 1890. The nomination was made despite Harrison's policy of selecting men who already lived within the territory. Senate confirmation came on April 26. Gooding left for the territory on May 1 and took his oath of office in Prescott on May 7, 1890.

By most traditional measures, Gooding had a successful career as a judge. During his three years of service at the district level, he saw just eleven of his decisions appealed and only two of those decisions reversed by a higher court. At the appellate level, he wrote a dozen opinions, a number of which served as precedents in later cases. In Territory of Arizona v. Blevins, 4 Arizona 68 (1893), Gooding granted a new trial after it was determined the trial court had made a fatal error by not having the defendant enter a plea before the jury reached a verdict. In Oury v. Goodwin, 3 Arizona 225 (1891) he found that land used to build a canal system qualified as public use for purposes of eminent domain determinations while Territory of Arizona v. Delinquent Tax-List of the County of Maricopa, 3 Arizona 302 (1891) determined that the territory could tax railroads crossing Indian reservations unless the Federal government explicitly granted the railroads an exemption. Gooding found in Liebes v. Steffy, 4 Arizona 11 (1893) that separate property owned by a wife was unaffected by debts incurred by her husband.

With the coming of a Democratic administration in the White House, Gooding stated his intention of May 4, 1893 to resign. He administered the oath of office to his successor on May 24, 1893. After leaving the bench, the former chief justice remained in the territory until 1895, when he moved to Los Angeles, California. There he continued to practice law while staying active in veteran and Masonic activities. On March 11, 1900, Gooding was shot by a pair of assailants attempting to rob him. The assailants were never captured. The former chief justice recovered from the wound but the bullet, lodged near his heart, was never removed. Gooding died September 14, 1913. The bullet near his heart may have been a contributing factor in his death. Gooding was interred in a mausoleum at Inglewood Park Cemetery.
