= Cuban fever =

Form of tropical fever or malaria

Cuban fever (or calentura) was a popular name for a recurring form of tropical fever, sometimes accompanied by acute delirium. In 1898, a pathologist established that Cuban fever was a variety of malaria.

== Coining of the term ==
The term "Cuban fever" was coined by Nashville Doctor Alexander McCall in his 1845 letter to the Boston Medical and Surgical Journal, describing a very protracted form of "erysipelatous fever" he had observed in Brazil, Cuba, and the Yucatan Peninsula. In 1860 social reformer and author Julia Ward Howe described a condition she observed in a Cuban prison as Cuban fever.

== American troop infections in Cuba and the Philippines ==
The phrase was revived in the Spanish–American War to refer to a fever prevalent in Cuba and the Philippines, that attacked many of the American troops during the War or shortly after their return. It generally began with a chill and a body temperature of 103 °F. As the temperature rose higher, muscular pains began, with headache, loss of appetite, nausea, and marked weakness. Many patients spontaneously recovered within a week. However, the symptoms would often recur, sometimes daily, and sometimes at intervals of days or weeks. U.S. Army Major General William Rufus Shafter was repeatedly sidelined with Cuban fever after he returned home.

== Retrospective diagnosis ==
In an effort to establish a retrospective diagnosis, pathologist James Ewing of New York City studied blood samples of 800 patients with the disease, and found that 80 percent of the cases of Cuban fever were of the aestiva-autumnal type of malarial fever, and the remaining 20 percent were tertian malaria.

== Long-term infection of Theodore Roosevelt ==
After leading the "Rough Riders" of the 1st United States Volunteer Cavalry in the Spanish–American War, Colonel Theodore Roosevelt, like many of his troops, was diagnosed with Cuban fever. Although Roosevelt's doctors were treating it with drugs, the fever continued to recur long after he left the Army, before, during, and after his presidency.

The second part of Edmund Morris's 2001 biography of Roosevelt explains that, when experiencing the effects of the disease, the President was discovered outside of his cabin late at night, "completely disoriented", pacing in the snow in his bare feet, holding his hunting dog Skip to his chest.
