= Battle of Las Guásimas =

Battle in the Spanish–American War

- Part of the Spanish–American War
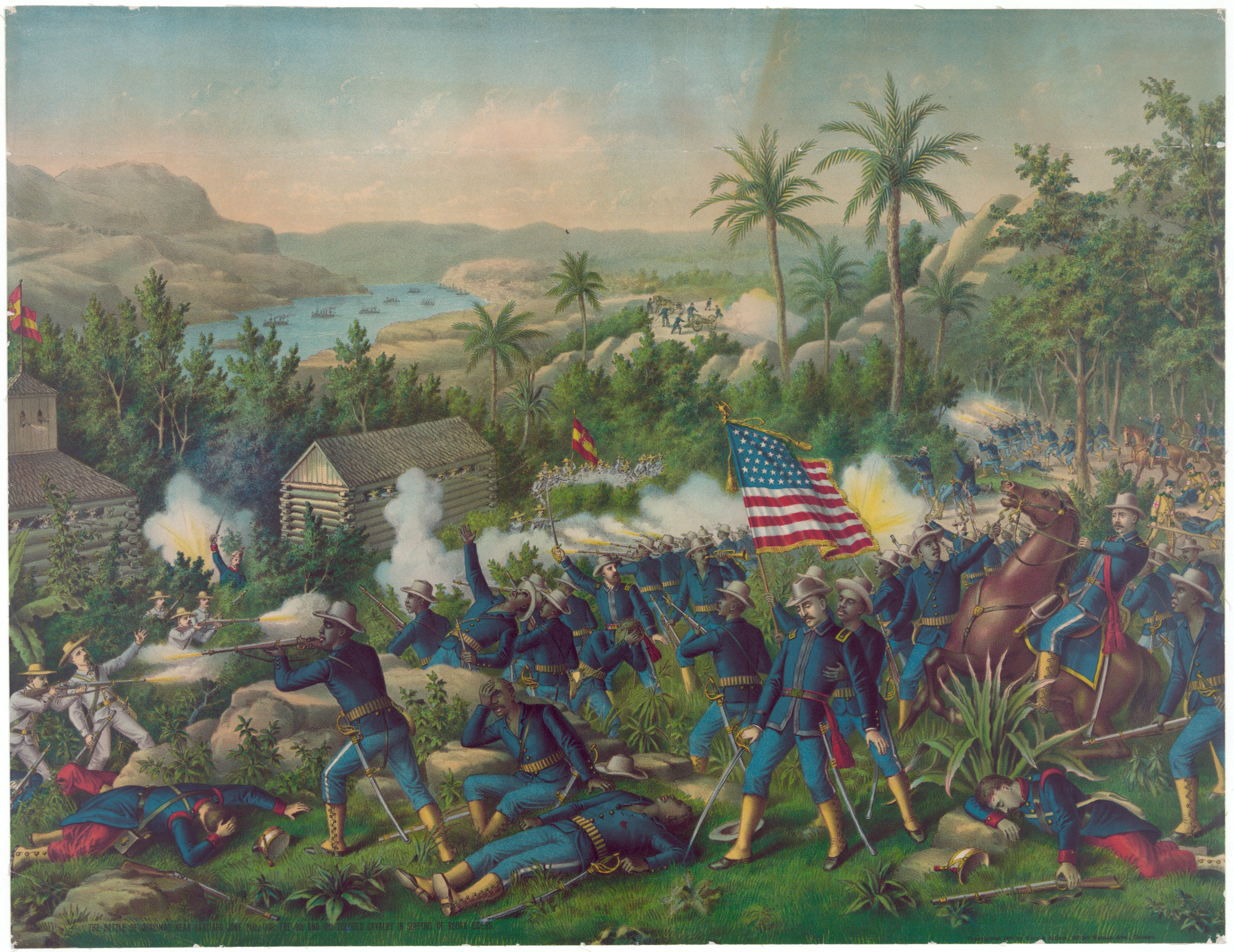
- The Battle of Guasimas near Santiago June 24th, 1898., Kurz and Allison
Date	June 24, 1898
Location	Near Santiago de Cuba, Cuba
Result	American victory

Belligerents
United States; Cuban rebels	Spain

Commanders and leaders
Joseph Wheeler; Demetrio Duany	Antero Rubín

Strength
1,764; 1 field gun	1,500; 2 mountain guns

Casualties and losses
17 killed 52 wounded	7 killed 14 wounded

The Battle of Las Guásimas of June 24, 1898 was a Spanish rearguard action by Major General Antero Rubín against advancing columns led by Major General "Fighting Joe" Wheeler and the first land engagement of the Spanish–American War. The battle unfolded from Wheeler's attempt to storm Spanish positions at Las Guásimas de Sevilla, in the jungles surrounding Santiago de Cuba, with the 1st U.S. Volunteer Cavalry and the 10th Regular Cavalry.

Approaching on June 24, American reports suggested the Spaniards were digging in with a field gun; however, Cuban scouts contradicted these, revealing the Spaniards were preparing to abandon their position. In fact, the Spanish troops had received orders to fall back on Santiago. Wheeler requested the assistance of the attached Cuban forces in an immediate attack, but their commander, Col. Gonzales Clavel, refused. Wheeler decided to attack anyway, rushing his men forward with two field guns in tow.

During the excitement of the battle, Wheeler, a former Confederate officer, supposedly called out "Let's go, boys! We've got the damn Yankees on the run again!". Wheeler's forces moved to encircle the Spaniards' first battle line, assaulting its front and right flank, but were repulsed. During a pause in the fighting, both sides reinforced their positions. The Spaniards sent forward two companies of the San Fernando Battalion, along with artillery. After midday the U.S. attack was renewed, but the Spanish Provisional de Puerto Rico Battalion once again checked the American assault.

After halting the American advance, the Spanish resumed their withdrawal towards Santiago. The battle had cost U.S. forces seventeen dead and fifty-two wounded, while Spanish forces suffered seven dead and fourteen wounded. The American "yellow" press, unaware of the facts of the ground, described the battle as a rout of the Spaniards; later, historians severely faulted Wheeler for wasting the lives of his men in a frontal assault.

== Background ==
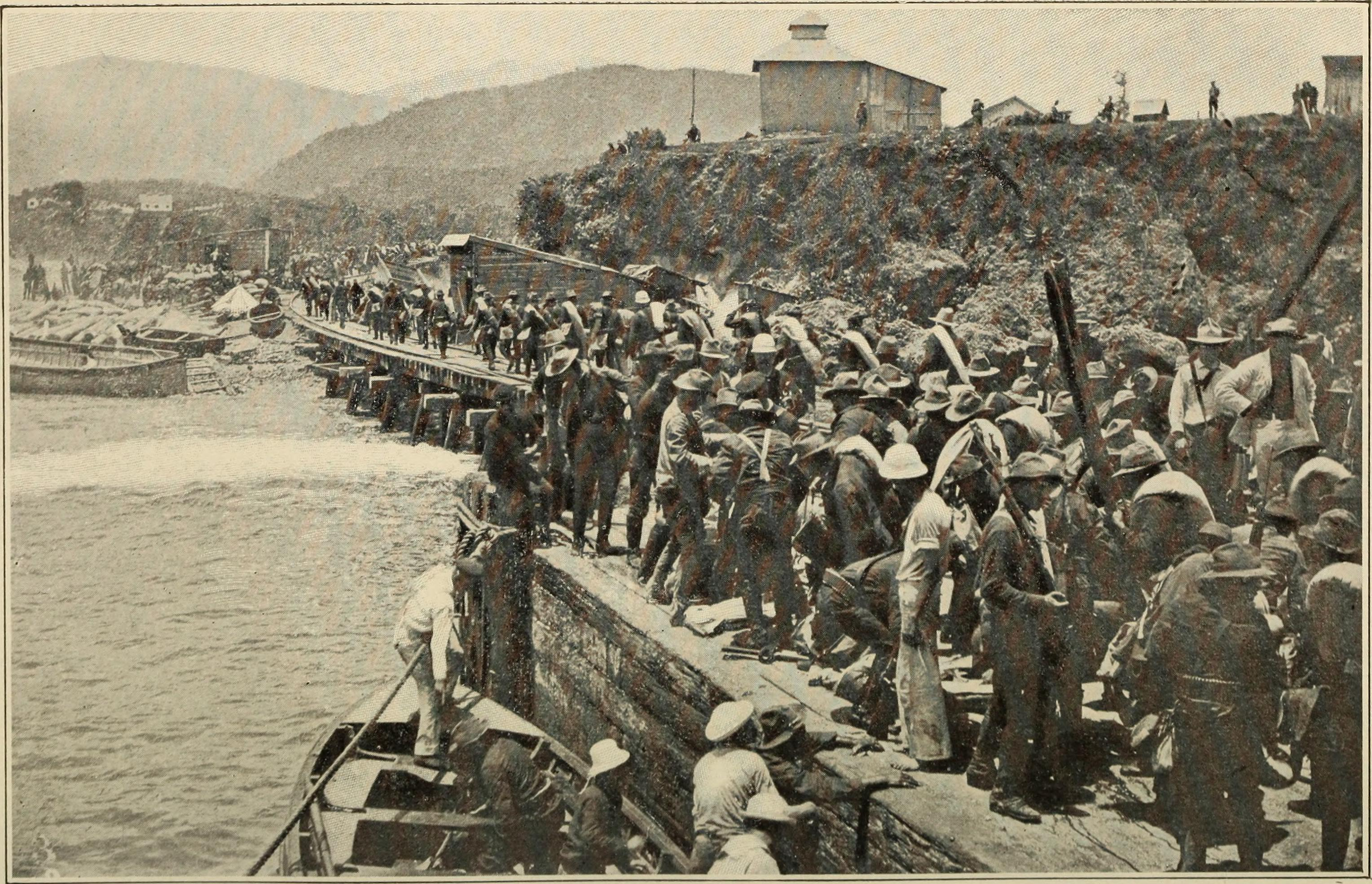
Troops land, unopposed

On June 23, the Spanish garrisons of Sigua, Siboney and Daiquirí, retiring before American landings in their vicinity, clashed with a Cuban advance guard column of 250 men under Colonel Carlos González Clavel near Sevilla, east of Santiago de Cuba. Having lost three dead and 10 wounded in the skirmish and inflicted roughly the same casualties, the Spaniards retired to a lightly entrenched position at Las Guásimas de Sevilla, on the road to Santiago (4 miles northwest of Siboney beach).

Brigadier-General Lawton, commander of the 2nd Infantry Division of the U.S. Volunteers V Corps, had been appointed chief of the landing operation by Major General William Rufus Shafter, Commander-in-Chief of American forces in Cuba. American reports suggested the Spaniards were digging in with a field gun; however, Cuban scouts contradicted these, revealing the Spaniards were preparing to abandon their position.

On the 23rd, Major General Joseph Wheeler, received orders from Shafter to throw pickets to Siboney, but found the enemy in retreat towards Sevilla, with about 100 Cubans engaging their rear. Wheeler decided to attack the new Spanish positions the next day, which were established three miles from Siboney, with the aid of General Castillo. With information supplied by General Castillo, including a map of the Spanish positions, Wheeler and General Young planned an advance along two columns, Col. Wood on the left and the 1st and 10th cavalry on the right.

== Battle ==
Brigadier General Antero Rubín commanded nearly 1,500 men and 2 guns, distributed as follows:

- 3 companies of the 1st "Provisional de Puerto Rico" infantry battalion,
- 5 companies of the 11th "San Fernando" infantry battalion
- 5 companies of the 4th "Talavera Peninsular" infantry battalion
- 2 companies of movilizados (Spanish levied loyalists)
- 2 platoons of engineers and 1 platoon of mountain artillery equipped with two 75 mm Krupp guns

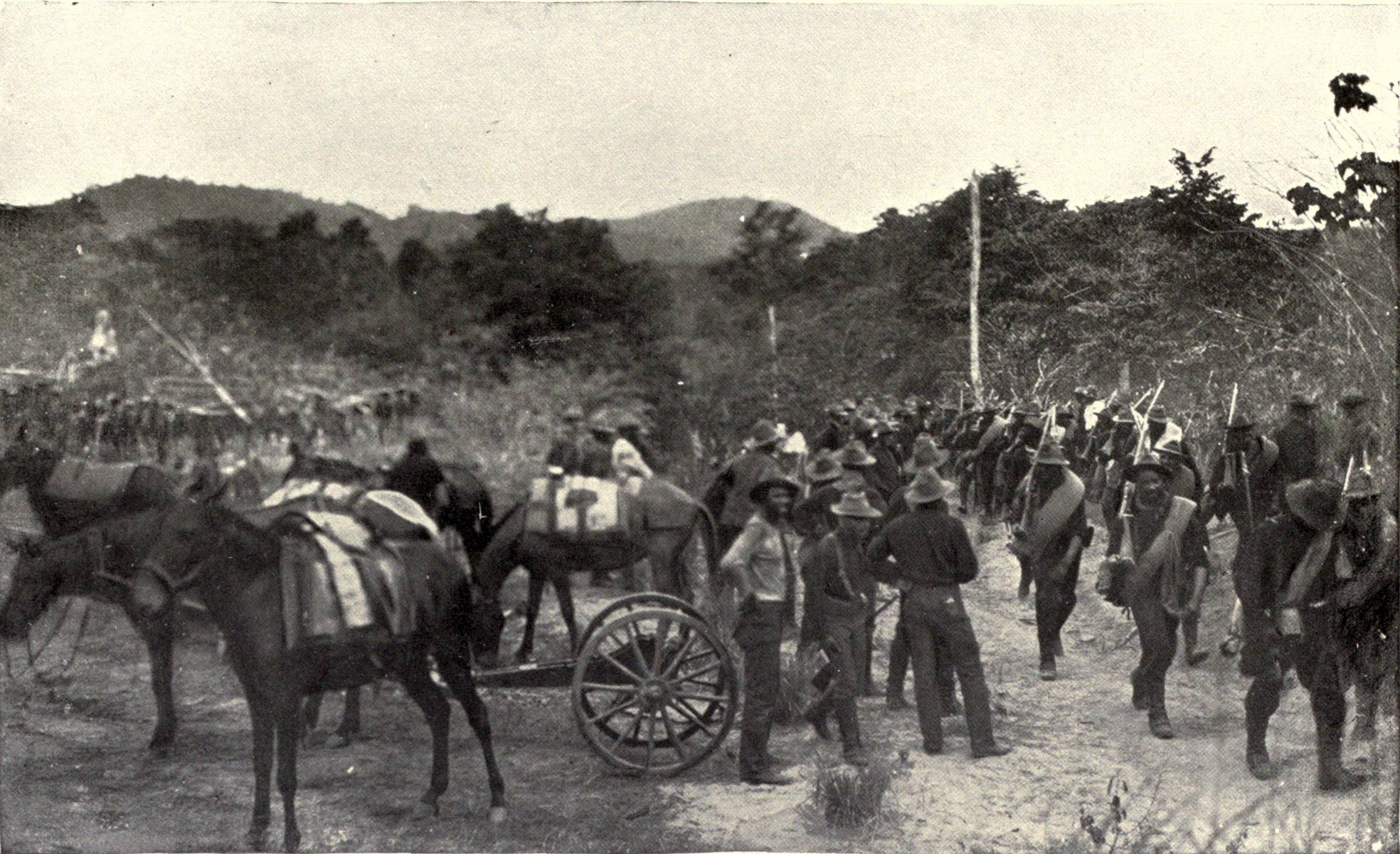
"On the battleground of Las Guasimas - Americans going to the front" in Harper's Pictorial History of the War with Spain, Vol. II, 1899.

These forces were deployed in three echelons: 3 companies of Puerto Rico and 1 company of movilizados covering the crossroads of the Siboney trails, with 2 other companies (San Fernando) guarding the surrounding heights; 3 companies (San Fernando), the engineers, and the artillery holding the Asiento de Sevilla; and 5 companies of Talavera and 1 company of movilizados at La Redonda under Colonel Bory, covering the trails to Justicí and El Pozo.

The American side included the 1st U.S. Volunteer Cavalry, or "Rough Riders", under Leonard Wood, the 1st U.S. Regular Cavalry, and the 10th U.S. Regular Cavalry (this consisted of Afro-American soldiers, then called Buffalo soldiers). Supported by artillery, the American forces numbered 964 men, supported by 800 men from Castillo.

The first sign the Americans had of the enemy's proximity was a Cuban Army soldier lying dead by the road. The engagement began with shots by U.S. artillery. Spanish infantry returned fire, pinning down the advancing American units with rifle volleys. The Spaniards were armed with superior German-made 7mm 1893 model Mauser repetition rifles that fired round after round of smokeless gunpowder, making them exceedingly difficult to target in return. Present during the battle, author Stephen Crane (famous for his novel The Red Badge of Courage) Crane wrote that the German-made guns “sounded as if one string of a most delicate musical instrument had been touched by the wind into a long, faint note, or that overhead someone had swiftly swung a long, thin-lashed whip.”

=== 1st & 10th Cavalry attack Las Guásimas on the right road ===
Wheeler's forces moved to encircle the Spaniards' first echelon, assaulting its front and right flank. Brigade commander SBM Young personally supervised the positioning of a battery of one pounder Hotchkiss field guns 900 yards from the Spanish main position on a dominant ridge pointing Southwest. Wanting to be absolutely sure that the troops on the hill were not Spanish, he fired several rounds at the hill. Immediately, two 75mm Spanish Krupp-designed mountain guns returned fire. Satisfied that he was up against the Spanish. Writing in his serialized set of articles (and later book), "The Rough Riders," Theodore Roosevelt described the opening phase of the battle that started on the right road and involved the 1st and 10th Regular Cavalry in Chapter III "General Young's Fight." as follows:

The denseness of the jungle and the fact that they used absolutely smokeless powder, made it exceedingly difficult to place exactly where they were, and almost immediately Young, who always liked to get as close as possible to his enemy, began to push his troops forward. They were deployed on both sides of the road in such thick jungle that it was only here and there that they could possibly see ahead, and some confusion, of course, ensued, the support gradually getting mixed with the advance. Captain Beck took A Troop of the Tenth in on the left, next to Captain Galbraith's (B) troop of the First; two other troops of the Tenth were on the extreme right. Through the jungle ran wire fences here and there, and as the troops got to the ridge they encountered precipitous heights. They were led most gallantly, as American regular officers always lead their men; and the men followed their leaders with the splendid courage always shown by the American regular soldier. There was not a single straggler among them, and in not one instance was an attempt made by any trooper to fall out in order to assist the wounded or carry back the dead, while so cool were they and so perfect their fire discipline, that in the entire engagement the expenditure of ammunition was not over ten rounds per man. Major Bell, who commanded the squadron, had his leg broken by a shot as he was leading his men. Captain Wainwright succeeded to the command of the squadron. Captain Knox was shot in the abdomen. He continued for some time giving orders to his troops, and refused to allow a man in the firing-line to assist him to the rear. His First Lieutenant, Byram, was himself shot, but continued to lead his men until the wound and the heat overcame him and he fell in a faint. The advance was pushed forward under General Young's eye with the utmost energy, until the enemy's voices could be heard in the entrenchments. The Spaniards kept up a very heavy firing, but the regulars would not be denied, and as they climbed the ridges (on the right side of the Camino Real road going into the village of Las Guásimas from the southeast) the Spaniards broke and fled."

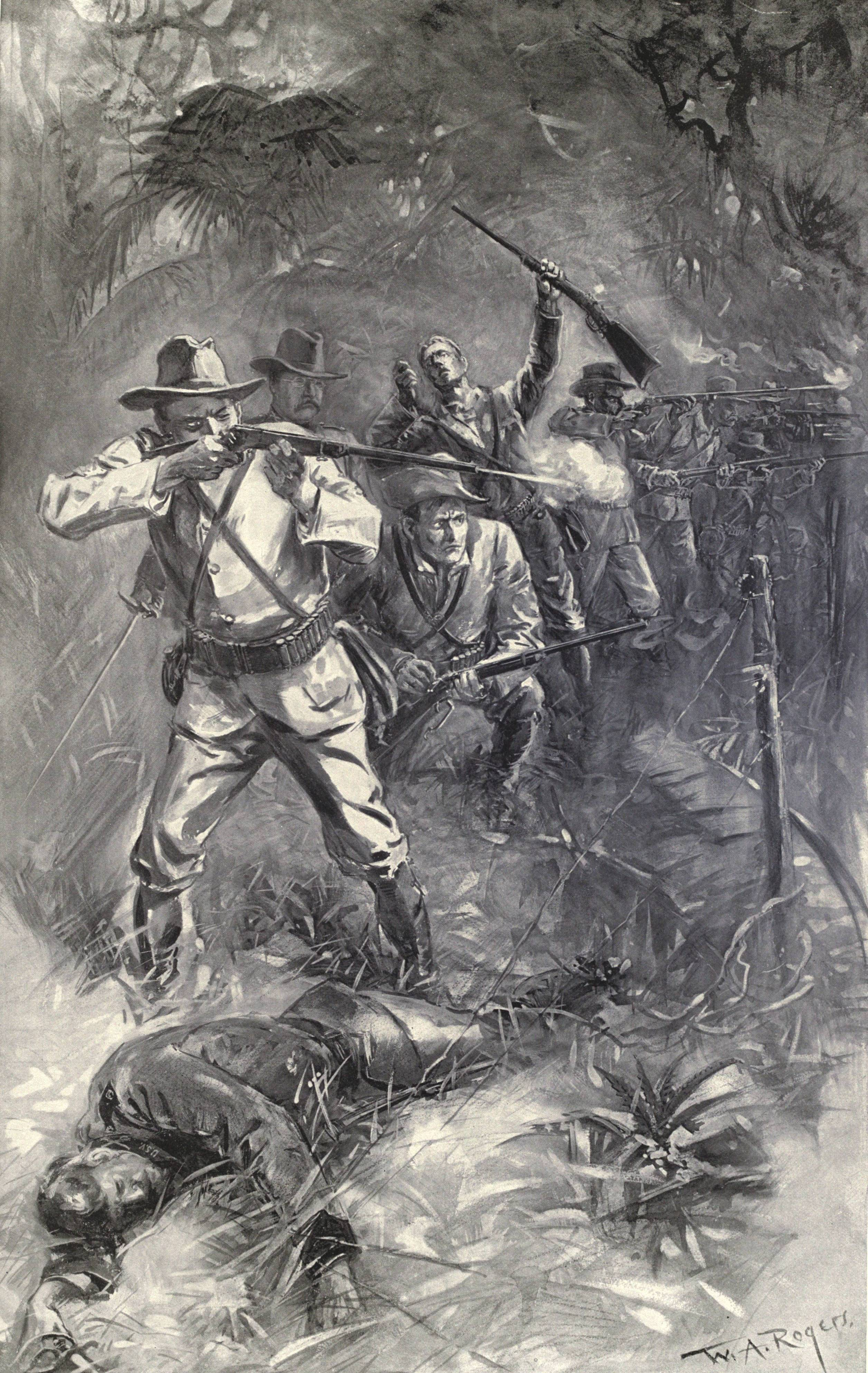
"The Battle of Las Guasimas, June 24 - Theodore Roosevelt can be seen 2d from left of standing soldiers in this fanciful sketch of the 'Rough Riders'" in Harper's Pictorial History of the War with Spain, 1899.

Spanish claims that they had twice repulsed the American attack were not born by any battlefield reports of Troop commanders that day.

=== 1st Volunteer "Rough Riders" attack Las Guásimas on the left trail ===
On the left trail, at approximately 7:20am, the four man point patrol 250 yds ahead of L Troop commanded by Captain Alyn Capron came across the dead Spanish soldier killed by a Cuban attack the previous day and which the Cubans had told Wheeler would indicate the proximity of Spanish lines running left and right across the road. When informed of this by Capron, Leonard Wood, who was about 500 yards back on the bridle path and commanding the Rough Riders ordered "Silence in the Ranks" and immediately deployed several troops to the left under Major Brodie and several troops to the right under Lt. Col. Roosevelt. It was while this deployment was occurring that the point man shot a Spaniard and triggered an immediate return fire by volleys on the part of the Spaniards. Rough Riders on both left and right sides of the trail moved forward and eventually forced the Spaniards back to their second line of trenches. Continuing to advance, the Rough Riders eventually forced the Spanish to withdraw completely from their final positions. Rough Riders from A Troop on the far right linked up with their regular counterparts and helped them seize the Spanish positions on the long finger-like hill to the right of the right road, with both Rough Riders and Regulars meeting at the base of the finger-like hill. By this time it was approximately 9:30. Reinforcements from the regular 9th Cavalry arrived, but it was already 30 minutes after the fight.

After halting the American advance, the Spanish inexplicably resumed their ongoing withdrawal towards Santiago's outer defenses instead of profiting from the sharp reverse inflicted on the Americans, allowing "American observers [to] unanimously but incorrectly assume their attack had forced the enemy to retreat."

Spanish forces suffered 7 dead and 7 wounded, as reported by general Rubin, although these figures are sometimes revised upward. (The discrepancy occurs because the Spaniards at Las Guásimas escorted a convoy carrying wounded troopers, as can be read in the order of retreat sent to General Rubin by Lt. General Arsenio Linares on the afternoon of the 24th.)

== Aftermath ==
Both sides emerged satisfied with their perceived "little victory." Rubín had conducted a successful rearguard operation while guaranteeing the safety of his forces, moving away from the menacing, large-caliber guns of the U.S. Navy along the coast and connecting with the Spanish defenders of Santiago. After satisfactorily drawing "first blood" at Las Guásimas, Wheeler concentrated the U.S. Volunteer V Corp with General Calixto García's 5,000 Cubans and invested Santiago's first lines of defense. American morale and confidence soared.

The position at Sevilla, briefly occupied by American forces, turned out to be of little value for the aimed advance towards Santiago. General Shafter considered installing his headquarters at La Redonda once the landing was completed, moving it afterwards to El Pozo. The Spanish retreat did unbar the way to the strong points that covered Santiago on the east side, mainly Fort Aguadores, San Juan Hill, Canosa, El Caney, and Fort El Viso, where a set of bloody battles would be waged on July 1. Many of the Spanish officers and soldiers that fought at Las Guásimas de Sevilla were to be in the fight again at the bloody encounter of San Juan Hill.

Although Colonel Gonzalez Clavel was criticized by some U.S. officers for not taking part in the attack, he had in fact acted in accordance with military protocol and his directives from General Lawton, the supreme authority during the landing, the Headquarters' orders being not to advance until the landing was completed. Gonzalez Clavel's actions were warmly approved by General Lawton and General Calixto Garcia. Moreover, historical scrutiny of the operation has suggested the Americans erred badly in pursuing a frontal attack against a Spanish position which might have been turned or enveloped with much less difficulty; had the Spaniards elected to hold their ground, Wheeler may have sustained a very severe defeat. An officer with the Rough Riders reflected: "It is a good thing we are not at war with England or Germany or France, for we should not last a week."

The Spanish deployment around Santiago has likewise been sternly criticized. Observers faulted Linares for failing to challenge the American disembarkation at Siboney altogether and Rubín for yielding the ridges at Las Guásimas—despite orders to this effect—to an American column that had failed to eject him. One historian suggested the Spaniards could not oppose the American advance without exposing themselves to a potentially devastating bombardment from long-range naval guns. The inefficacy of American naval gunfire against shore-based positions throughout the war may cast doubt on this assertion.

== In fiction ==
This engagement was featured in the miniseries Rough Riders starring Tom Berenger as Theodore Roosevelt. The film depicts it as an American success, albeit a costly one. It was also mentioned in Benjamin's Field: Rescue, the first book of a fictional trilogy by author J. J. Knights. Knights describes the battle as a costly and wasteful venture that had an enduring negative impact on the novel's protagonist, Benjamin Kyner, who fought in the battle as a corporal.

=== Inaccuracies ===
There are several inaccuracies in the movie. The Colt Rapid Firing guns seen in the movie's depiction of the battle were never used in the actual fight as the mules that hauled the disassembled weapons, bolted with the first Spanish fire dumping the guns on the ground and temporarily jamming their firing mechanisms beyond easy field repair. Lieutenant Pershing was not in command of the regular cavalry troops. In the final assault, the commander of the two regular and volunteer regiments were nowhere near each other. The Rough Riders were on the left flank and the regulars were on the right – exactly the opposite to the movie. Roosevelt was not at the far right end of the Rough Riders line, near the regulars. Instead, he was on the far left end of the Rough Riders, having been ordered to take over the wounded Major Alexander Brodie's squadron of troops D, E and F. Trooper Harry Hefner was not found dying at the old dystellery house. He was left, wounded, prompted up and continuing to fire. He was found dead after the battle. The man shot along with Hamilton Fish was Trooper Ed Culver. He was not the porter to the officers.

=== Accuracies ===
The Spanish Mauser rifles were authentic. The map seen at the final assault is an enlargement of a map drawn by Harpers Monthly War correspondent, Caspar Whitney.
