= Siege of Santiago order of battle =

The following units and commanders of the U.S. and Spanish armies fought at the Siege of Santiago during the Spanish–American War from July 3 to July 17, 1898.

== Abbreviations used ==
=== Military Rank ===
- Gen = General
- MG = Major General
- BG = Brigadier General
- Col = Colonel
- Ltc = Lieutenant Colonel
- Maj = Major
- Cpt = Captain
- Lt = 1st Lieutenant

=== Other ===
- w = wounded
- k = killed
- m = missing

== U.S. ==
Commanding General of the United States Army - MG Nelson A. Miles arrived July 11

=== V Corps ===
MG William R. Shafter

General Staff

- Adjutant General: Ltc Edward J. McClernand
- Asst. Adjutant General: Capt James C. Gillmore
- Inspector General: Ltc John Jacob Astor IV

Headquarters

- 1st Squadron, 2nd U.S. Cavalry: Maj William A. Rafferty Sr.
- Companies C & E, U.S. Engineers: Capt Edward Burr
- Signal Corps Detachment: Capt Alexander D. B. Smead

Division	Brigade	Regiments and Others
1st Division; BG Jacob Ford Kent	1st Brigade Brevet BG Hugh A. Theaker	6th U.S. Infantry: Maj Charles W. Miner; 16th U.S. Infantry: Col Hugh A. Theaker, Maj. William H. McLaughlin; 71st New York Volunteer Infantry: Col Wallace A. Downs
1st Division; BG Jacob Ford Kent	2nd Brigade Col Edward P. Pearson	2nd U.S. Infantry: Ltc William M. Wherry; 10th U.S. Infantry: Ltc Edgar R. Kellogg; 21st U.S. Infantry: Capt Frederick H. B. Ebstein
1st Division; BG Jacob Ford Kent	3rd Brigade Ltc Ezra P. Ewers; BG Adelbert Ames	9th U.S. Infantry: Ltc Ezra P. Ewers; 13th U.S. Infantry: Maj William Auman; 24th U.S. Infantry: Maj. Alfred C. Markley
2nd Division; MG Henry W. Lawton	1st Brigade BG William Ludlow	8th U.S. Infantry: Major Casper H. Conrad; 22nd U.S. Infantry: Major William M. Van Horne; 2nd Massachusetts Volunteer Infantry: Colonel Embury P. Clark
2nd Division; MG Henry W. Lawton	2nd Brigade BG Chambers McKibbin	1st U.S. Infantry: Ltc William Henry Bisbee; 4th U.S. Infantry: Maj Stephen A. Baker; 25th U.S. Infantry: Ltc Aaron S. Daggett
2nd Division; MG Henry W. Lawton	3rd Brigade BG Adna R. Chaffee	7th U.S. Infantry: Ltc Gilbert S. Carpenter; 12th U.S. Infantry: Ltc Richard Comba; 17th U.S. Infantry: Maj Lyster M. O'Brien
Independent Division; MG John C. Bates	1st Brigade Col John H. Page	3rd U.S. Infantry: Ltc Abram A. Harbach; 20th U.S. Infantry: Maj William S. McCaskey
Independent Division; MG John C. Bates	2nd Brigade Col Henry L. Turner	1st Illinois Volunteer Infantry: Col Henry L. Turner, Ltc George V. Lauman; 1st District of Columbia Infantry: Col George Herbert Harries; 9th Massachusetts Infantry: Ltc Lawrence J. Logan
Cavalry Division; MG Joseph Wheeler	1st Brigade BG Samuel S. Sumner	3rd U.S. Cavalry: Maj. Henry W. Wessells Jr.; 6th U.S. Cavalry: Maj. Thomas C. Lebo; 9th U.S. Cavalry: Maj William C. Forbush
Cavalry Division; MG Joseph Wheeler	2nd Brigade BG Leonard Wood	1st U.S. Cavalry: Col Charles D. Viele; 10th U.S. Cavalry: Ltc Theodore A. Baldwin; 1st U.S. Volunteer Cavalry: Col Theodore Roosevelt
Artillery	Light Artillery Battalion BG Wallace F. Randolph	Light Battery E, 1st U.S. Artillery: Cpt Allyn Capron; Light Battery K, 1st U.S. Artillery: Cpt Clermont L. Best Jr.; Light Battery A, 2nd U.S. Artillery: Cpt George S. Grimes; Light Battery F, 2nd U.S. Artillery: Cpt Charles D. Parkhurst; Light Battery F, 4th U.S. Artillery:– Cpt Sydney W. Taylor; Light Battery F, 5th U.S. Artillery: Cpt Henry J. Reilly Sr.
Artillery	Siege Artillery	Battery G & H, 4th U.S. Artillery: Cpt William Ennis; Gatling Gun detachment: 2LT John H. Parker
Reserves	Separate Brigade (II Corps) BG Henry M. Duffield	8th Ohio Volunteer Infantry: Col Curtis V. Hard; 33rd Michigan Volunteer Infantry: Col Charles L. Boynton; 34th Michigan Volunteer Infantry: Col John P. Petermann

== Cuban ==
=== Army of Liberation ===
Lieutenant General Calixto García

- Insurgents: General Jesús Rabí
- Insurgents: General Sabás Raimundo Sánchez
- Insurgents: General José Manuel Capote
- Insurgents: General Agustín Cebreco
- Insurgents: General Saturnino Lora Torres
- Insurgents: General Minet
- Insurgents: General Demetrio Castillo Duany

(further composition unknown)

== Spanish ==
=== IV Corps ===
Gen José Toral y Velázquez

Division	Brigade	Regiments and Others
Santiago Division	1st Brigade	1st Provisional Battalion of Puerto Rico; 4th Battalion Talavera Peninsular Regiment; 1st Battalion San Fernando Regiment; 1st Battalion Asia Regiment; 1st Battalion Constitution Regiment; 1st Battalion Cuba Regiment; 2nd Battalion Cuba Regiment; 1st Battalion Simancas Regiment

== See also ==
- San Juan Hill order of battle
- El Caney order of battle
- List of orders of battle
