= Battle of San Juan Hill order of battle =

The following units and commanders of the U.S. and Spanish armies fought at the Battle of San Juan Hill during the Spanish–American War on July 1, 1898.

== Abbreviations used ==
=== Military Rank ===
- Gen = General
- MG = Major General
- BG = Brigadier General
- Col = Colonel
- Ltc = Lieutenant Colonel
- Maj = Major
- Cpt = Captain
- Lt = 1st Lieutenant

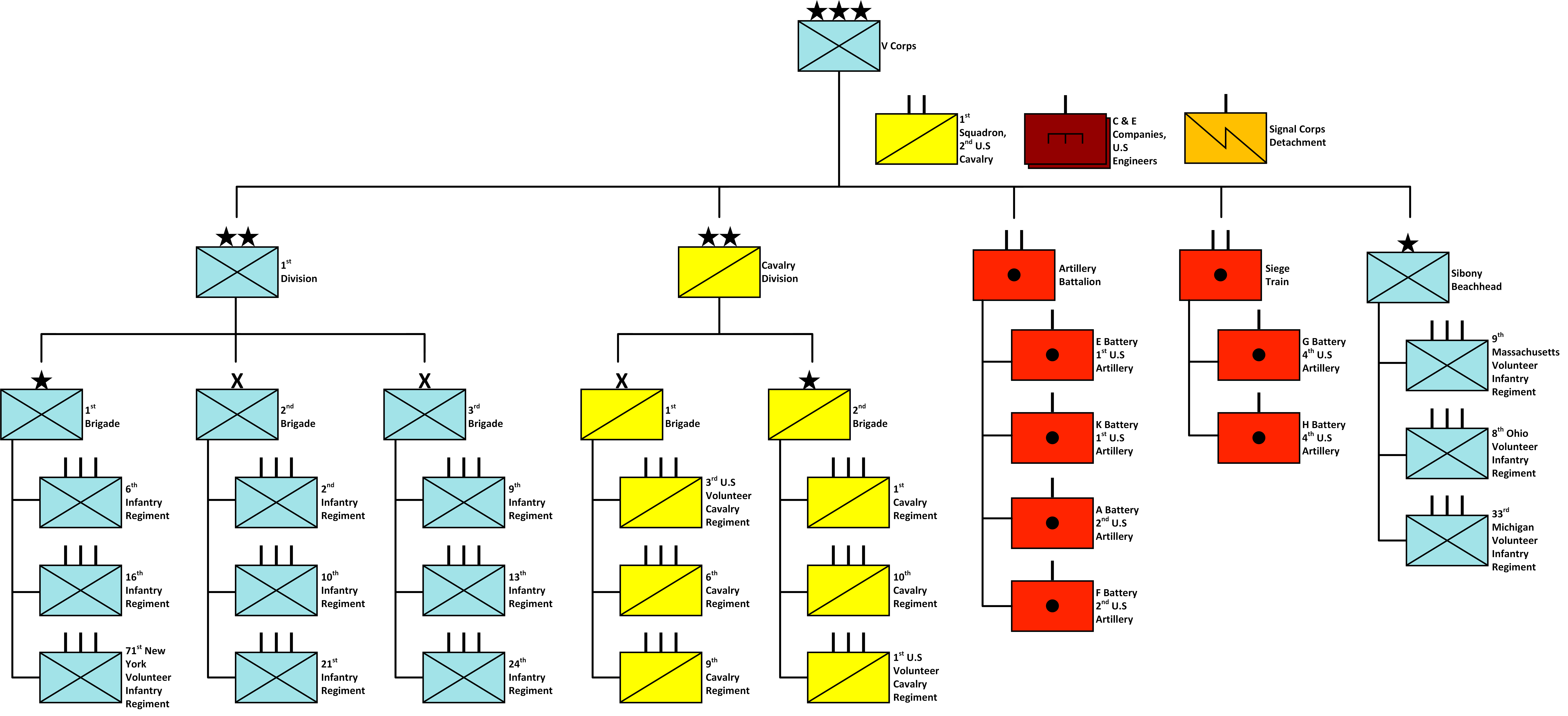
United States V Corps at the Battle of San Juan Hill

=== Other ===
- w = wounded
- k = killed
- m = missing

== U.S. ==
=== V Corps ===
MG William R. Shafter

- MG Joseph Wheeler, second-in-command

Headquarters

- 1st Squadron, 2nd U.S. Cavalry - Cpt. Thomas J. Lewis
- Companies C & E, U.S. Engineers
- Signal Corps Detachment

Division	Brigade	Regiments and Others
1st Division; BG Jacob Ford Kent; K-89, W-495, M-58 = 642	1st Brigade BG Hamilton S. Hawkins, (w, July 2)	6th U.S. Infantry: Ltc Harry C. Egbert; 16th U.S. Infantry: Col Hugh A. Theaker; 71st New York Volunteer Infantry: Col Wallace A. Downs
1st Division; BG Jacob Ford Kent; K-89, W-495, M-58 = 642	2nd Brigade Col Edward P. Pearson	2nd U.S. Infantry: Ltc William M. Wherry; 10th U.S. Infantry: Ltc Edgar R. Kellogg; 21st U.S. Infantry: Ltc Chambers McKibbin
1st Division; BG Jacob Ford Kent; K-89, W-495, M-58 = 642	3rd Brigade Col Charles A. Wikoff (k); Ltc William S. Worth (w); Ltc Emerson H. Liscum (w); Ltc Ezra P. Ewers	9th U.S. Infantry - Ltc Ezra P. Ewers, Maj William H. Boyle; 13th U.S. Infantry - Ltc William S. Worth, Maj William Auman, Maj Philip H. Ellis (w); 24th U.S. Infantry - Ltc Emerson H. Liscum, Cpt Henry Wygant
Cavalry Division (dismounted); BG Samuel S. Sumner; MG Joseph Wheeler; K-46, W-329, M-0 = 375	1st Brigade Ltc Henry Carroll (w); BG Samuel S. Sumner	3rd U.S. Cavalry - Colonel Samuel Baldwin Marks Young, Maj Henry W. Wessells Jr. (w); 6th U.S. Cavalry – Ltc Henry Carroll (w), Maj Thomas C. Lebo; 9th U.S. Cavalry – Ltc John M. Hamilton (k), Cpt Eugene D. Dimmick
Cavalry Division (dismounted); BG Samuel S. Sumner; MG Joseph Wheeler; K-46, W-329, M-0 = 375	2nd Brigade BG Leonard Wood	1st U.S. Cavalry – Col Charles D. Viele; 10th U.S. Cavalry – Ltc Theodore A. Baldwin; 1st U.S. Volunteer Cavalry – Col Theodore Roosevelt
Artillery	Light Artillery Battalion Maj John W. Dillenback	Battery K, 1st U.S. Artillery - Cpt Clermont L. Best Jr.; Battery A, 2nd U.S. Artillery - Cpt George S. Grimes; Battery F, 2nd U.S. Artillery - Cpt Charles D. Parkhurst
Artillery	Siege Artillery Battalion Cpt William Ennis	Battery G, 4th U.S. Artillery - Cpt William Ennis; Battery H, 4th U.S. Artillery - Cpt John E. McMahon
Attached Units	Sibony Beachhead Garrison BG Henry M. Duffield	9th Massachusetts Volunteer Infantry - Col Fred B. Bogan; 8th Ohio Volunteer Infantry - Col Curtis V. Hard; 33rd Michigan Volunteer Infantry - Col Charles L. Boynton; 34th Michigan Volunteer Infantry - Col John P. Peterman; Battery E, 1st U.S. Artillery - Cpt Allyn Capron

== Spanish ==
=== IV Corps ===
Gen Arsenio Linares (w)
Gen José Toral y Velázquez

Division	Brigade	Regiments and Others
1st Division Manzanillo	Escario's Brigade	3rd Peninsular Battalion “Alcántara ”; 19th Light Infantry Battalion “Puerto Rico”; 1st Battalion, 52nd “Andalucía” Regiment; 1st Battalion, 75th “Isabel la Católica” Regiment; 2nd Battalion, 75th “Isabel la Católica” Regiment
1st Division Manzanillo	Attached Units	1st Tercio of Guerrillas; 2nd Tercio of Guerrillas; 1st Cavalry Regiment; 6th Battery, 4th Mounted Artillery; 1st Battery, 5th Foot Artillery; Engineers and Sappers
2nd Division Santiago; Gen José Toral y Velázquez	1st Brigade	1st Provisional Battalion of Puerto Rico; 4th Peninsular Battalion “Talavera”; 1st Battalion, 11th “San Fernando” Regiment; 1st Battalion, 29th “Constitución” Regiment; 1st Battalion, 55th “Asia” Regiment; 1st Battalion, 64th “Simancas” Regiment; 1st Battalion, 65th “Cuba” Regiment; 2nd Battalion, 65th “Cuba” Regiment

== See also ==
- El Caney order of battle
