= Theaker =

Theaker is a surname. Notable people with this name include:

- Cam Theaker (1912–1992), English footballer
- Deborah Theaker (born 1964), Canadian actress
- Harry Theaker (1873–1954), English painter, illustrator
- Hugh A. Theaker (1842–1903), American colonel
- Raer Theaker (born 1997), Welsh gymnast
- Thomas Clarke Theaker (1812–1883), American politician
- Theaker Wilder (1717–1778), Irish professor
