= Battle of El Caney order of battle =

The following units and commanders of the U.S. and Spanish armies fought at the Battle of El Caney during the Spanish–American War on July 1, 1898.

== Abbreviations used ==
=== Military Rank ===
- MG = Major General
- BG = Brigadier General
- Col = Colonel
- Ltc = Lieutenant Colonel
- Maj = Major
- Cpt = Captain
- Lt = 1st Lieutenant

=== Other ===
- w = wounded
- k = killed
- m = missing

== U.S. ==
=== Fifth Army Corps ===
MG William R. Shafter, not present

Division	Brigade	Regiments and Others
2nd Division; BG Henry W. Lawton	1st Brigade BG William Ludlow	8th U.S. Infantry: Maj Casper Hauzer Conrad; 22nd U.S. Infantry: Ltc John H. Patterson; 2nd Massachusetts Volunteer Infantry: Col Embury P. Clark
2nd Division; BG Henry W. Lawton	2nd Brigade Col Evan Miles	1st U.S. Infantry: Ltc William Henry Bisbee; 4th U.S. Infantry: Ltc Augustus H. Bainbridge; 25th U.S. Infantry: Ltc Aaron S. Daggett
2nd Division; BG Henry W. Lawton	3rd Brigade BG Adna R. Chaffee	7th U.S. Infantry: Ltc Gilbert S. Carpenter; 12th U.S. Infantry: Ltc Richard Comba; 17th U.S. Infantry: Ltc Joseph T. Haskell (w)
2nd Division; BG Henry W. Lawton	Independent Brigade (IV Corps) BG John C. Bates	3rd U.S. Infantry: Col John H. Page; 20th U.S. Infantry: Maj William S. McCaskey; 1st Marine Battalion: Ltc Robert W. Huntington

== Spanish ==
=== IV Corps ===
Gen Arsenio Linares, not present

Brigade	Regiments and Others
1st Brigade; BG Joaquin Vara del Rey (k)	29th Battalion, Constitution Regiment; 55th Battalion, Asia Regiment; 65th Battalion, Cuba Regiment; 1st Battalion of Puerto Rico; 11th Battalion, San Fernando Regiment; 1st Squadron, Cavalry Regiment El Rey; 4th Squadron, Cavalry Regiment El Rey; 6th Battery, 4th Mounted Artillery; 1st Train Company

== See also ==
- San Juan Hill order of battle
