= General Carroll =

General Carroll may refer to:

- Henry Carroll (general) (1836–1908), U.S. Army brigadier general
- Joseph Carroll (general) (1910–1991), U.S. Air Force lieutenant general
- Paul T. Carroll (1910–1954), U.S. Army brigadier general
- Samuel S. Carroll (1832–1893), Union Army brigadier general and brevet major general
- William Carroll (Tennessee politician) (1788–1844), Tennessee Militia major general in the War of 1812
- William Henry Carroll (1810–1868), Confederate States Army brigadier general
