= 158th Pennsylvania Infantry Regiment =

- Also known as the 158th Pennsylvania or the 158th Pennsylvania Volunteers
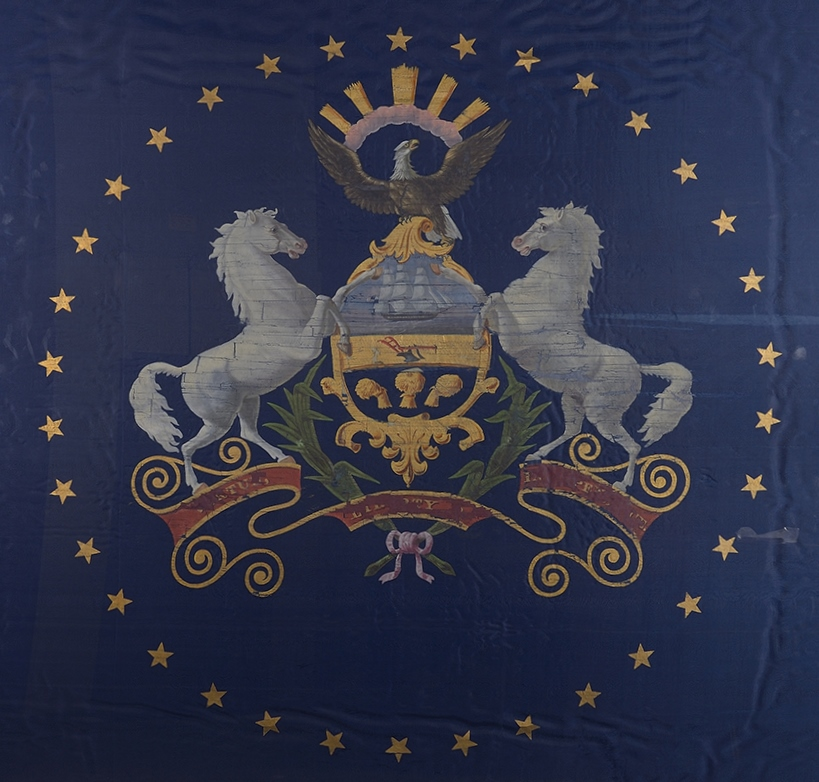
- State Flag of Pennsylvania (1863)
- Active: Between November 1 and November 4, 1862 - August 12, 1863
- Country: United States
- Allegiance: Union
- Branch: Union Army
- Type: Infantry
- Part of: VII Corps; XVIII Corps
- Engagements: Battle of Washington; Action at Blount's Creek; Skirmish at Big Swift Creek; Dix's Peninsula Campaign; Gettysburg Campaign

Commanders
- Notable commanders: Colonel David B. M'Kibben; Lieutenant Colonel Elias S. Troxel; Major Martin G. Hale

The 158th Pennsylvania Infantry Regiment was an infantry regiment that served with the Union Army during the American Civil War. Composed of drafted men serving a nine-month enlistment period, the regiment saw action in the Departments of Virginia and North Carolina.

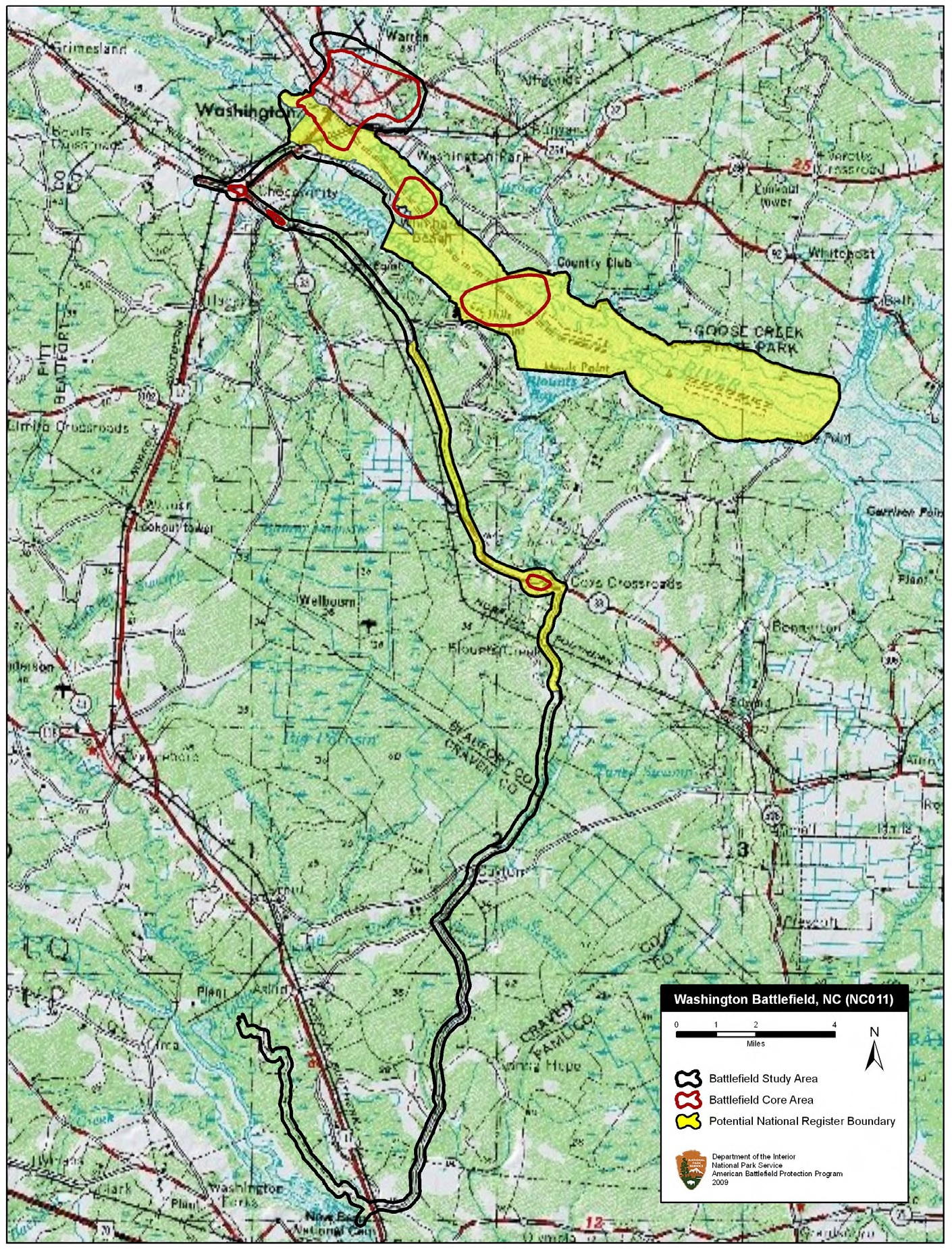
Map of Washington Battlefield core and study areas by the American Battlefield Protection Program.

== Organization ==
The regiment was recruited from the counties of Cumberland, Franklin, and Fulton as a part of the state's militia call-up in late 1862. It rendezvoused at Chambersburg, Pennsylvania, where it was organized and mustered into service between November 1 and November 4, 1862.

== Service ==
=== Early service ===
In late November 1862, the regiment was ordered to Suffolk, Virginia, where it was attached to Spinola's Brigade, Ferry's Division, VII Corps. From there, they underwent training until December 28, when the brigade was transferred to New Berne, North Carolina. They were subsequently attached to the 1st Brigade, 5th Division of the XVIII Corps and established winter quarters.

Between March 6 and March 10, 1863, the 158th took part in its first major expedition out of New Bern, moving through Trenton, Pollocksville, Young's Cross Roads, and Swansborough. During this expedition, operated as a part of a joint force that included the 3rd Massachusetts Infantry; the 132nd and 158th New York Infantry; two batteries of the 3rd New York Light Artillery and the 24th Independent Battery; as well as fellow Pennsylvanian regiments of the 168th, 171st and the 175th Infantry.

=== Operations in North Carolina ===
In March 1863, Confederate forces under D.H. Hill entered North Carolina and besieged the Union garrison at Washington on the Tar River. The 158th Pennsylvania was dispatched by water to help relieve the besieged town. The mission was fraught with difficulties; the transport vessels ran aground during a severe storm and were stranded for two days, resulting in the loss of stores.

Upon reaching the Pamlico River, the regiment found the channel blocked by Confederate obstructions and heavy batteries at Hill's and Rodman's Points. Though ordered to embark on the gunboats of Phoenix and Allison to run the blockade under the cover of darkness, the naval commander refused to execute the operation, deeming it 'too dangerous.'

Following this, the regiment returned to New Bern and joined a series of relief expeditions, those include:

- From April 8-10, 1863, an advance toward Washington that resulted in an artillery engagement at Blount's Creek on April 9
- From April 13-21, 1863, a subsequent expedition in which the regiment took the advance. They skirmished with Confederate forces at Big Swift Creek (April 14 and 19), successfully driving the Confederates from breastworks covering them.

Shortly thereafter, Confederate forces abandoned the siege and retreated towards Goldsboro. The 158th was then assigned to garrison duty in Washington and its surrounding fortifications until June 1863.

=== Virginia Campaign ===
In late June 1863, the regiment was ordered to report to General John Adams Dix at Fort Monroe, Virginia. From July 1-7, the 158th would take part in Dix's Peninsula Campaign, serving as a feint on Richmond via the White House Landing and Bottom's Bridge.

Picture of General John Adams Dix

Having completed the campaign, the regiment would move to Harper's Ferry, West Virginia, and then to Boonsboro, Maryland. In July 1863, they reported to General George Meade and joined the Army of the Potomac's pursuit of Robert E. Lee's Army of Northern Virginia following the Battle of Gettysburg. After Lee's army escaped across the Potomac River, the regiment was positioned on the National Road at South Mountain before moving to Frederick, Maryland.

With their nine-month enlistment period expiring, the regiment was ordered back to Pennsylvania in early August. They arrived in Chambersburg to be mustered out of Service on August 12, 1863.

== Notable commanders ==
- Colonel David B. M'Kibben
- Lieutenant Colonel Elias S. Troxel
- Major Martin G. Hale

== Casualties ==
The 158th Pennsylvania Infantry lost 45 men to disease.

The number of casualties the regiment took is not known yet.

== See also ==
- List of Pennsylvania units in the American Civil War
- Pennsylvania in the American Civil War

== External link ==
- Regimental Colors of the Regiment
