= James H. Ledlie =

American military officer and engineer (1832–1882)

James Hewett Ledlie
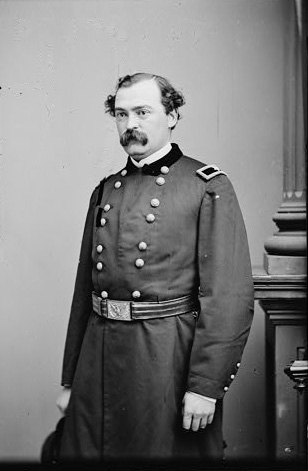
- Born: April 14, 1832; Utica, New York, U.S.
- Died: August 15, 1882 (aged 50); New Brighton, Staten Island, New York
- Burial place: Forest Hill Cemetery; Utica, New York, U.S.
- Military career
- Allegiance: United States of America; Union
- Branch: United States Army; Union Army
- Service years: 1861–1865
- Rank: Brigadier General
- Conflicts: American Civil War; Battle of North Anna; Second Battle of Petersburg; Battle of the Crater

James Hewett Ledlie (April 14, 1832 – August 15, 1882) was a civil engineer for American railroads and a general in the Union Army during the American Civil War. He is best known for his dereliction of duty at the Battle of the Crater during the Siege of Petersburg.

== Early life ==
Ledlie was born in Utica, New York. His obituaries in the New York Times and The Philadelphia Inquirer claimed he graduated from Union College, in Schenectady, New York, but the college has no record of his attendance there. Ledlie worked as a civil engineer on the Erie Canal and in railroad construction.

== Civil War ==
Shortly after the start of the Civil War, Ledlie was appointed major of the 19th New York Infantry, which was subsequently renamed the 3rd New York Light Artillery Regiment. The history of this regiment was marred by a mutiny at the expiration of its original term of service. Ledlie was promoted to colonel in December 1861 and was promoted to brigadier general in command of the Artillery Brigade of the Department of North Carolina in December 1862. (His appointment expired in March 1863 for lack of Senate confirmation, but he was reappointed in October 1863 and later confirmed.) For the next year and a half, he served primarily in garrison positions with North Carolina coastal artillery emplacements and the Department of Virginia and North Carolina.

Just after the start of Lt. Gen. Ulysses S. Grant's Overland Campaign in 1864, Ledlie transferred to the Army of the Potomac, commanding a brigade in Maj. Gen. Ambrose Burnside's IX Corps. On June 9, he was put in command of the 1st Division to succeed Brig. Gen Thomas G. Stevenson, who had been killed a few weeks earlier during the Battle of Spotsylvania. It was in this command that his brief military career was ruined.

During the Siege of Petersburg, former coal miners in Burnside's corps devised an ingenious plan to lift the stalemate by digging a 511-foot tunnel under the Confederate lines and filling the end of the tunnel with four tons of gunpowder. On July 30, 1864, they detonated the explosives, creating a crater some 135 feet in diameter that remains visible today. Some 250 to 350 Confederate soldiers were instantly killed in the blast. The Union plan was to exploit the explosion by sending well-rehearsed African-American troops of Edward Ferrero's division into the gap and driving for critical objectives deep in the Confederate rear area. However, Maj. Gen George Meade, the commander of the Army of the Potomac, ordered a column of white troops to make the lead assault on the crater instead of Ferrero's division of African American troops, who were trained specifically for the task. General Ulysses S. Grant approved the change in battle formation. In his later testimony before the Committee on the Conduct of the War, Meade claimed that he changed the order because the white troops were more experienced, not because he lacked faith in the capabilities of the African-American troops. Burnside, despondent at the change in plans, resorted to a lottery to select a replacement division. Ledlie drew the short straw, and disaster resulted. His division was the smallest and weakest in the IX Corps, and he did not brief his troops beforehand. They entered the crater out of curiosity instead of moving safely around its rim, as Ferrero's division had been trained to do. Unable to exit the steep sides of the crater, they were slaughtered by Confederates firing down on them. 3,798 Union troops were casualties in the ill-fated battle that achieved none of its objectives. Most damning for Ledlie's reputation was that he did not lead, or even accompany, his men into battle, and a few weeks earlier, during the attacks on Confederate entrenchments at Cold Harbor, he had run and hidden for cover, an event that the enlisted men did not forget, but which managed to escape Burnside's attention. During the Battle of the Crater, Ledlie and Ferrero were observed behind the lines in a bunker, drinking liquor.

Ledlie was criticized by a court of inquiry into his conduct that September. On orders from Gen. Grant, Maj. Gen. Meade effectively dismissed Ledlie from the service in December. He formally resigned his commission on January 23, 1865.

== Postbellum career ==
Ledlie resumed his career as a railroad civil engineer in the West and South. He participated in the construction of the transcontinental railroad as an employee of the Union Pacific. He also worked on constructing the Nevada Central Railroad line from Battle Mountain to Austin, Nevada, racing to get the 92-mile line built in half a year to meet a deadline before a bond issue expired. His crews got within two miles of the city limits of Austin before the deadline, and at the last minute, town officials quickly extended the city limits to meet the tracks.

Ledlie died in New Brighton, Staten Island in 1882 and is buried in Forest Hill Cemetery in Utica.

== See also ==
- List of American Civil War generals (Union)
