= William H. Boyle =

William Henry Boyle
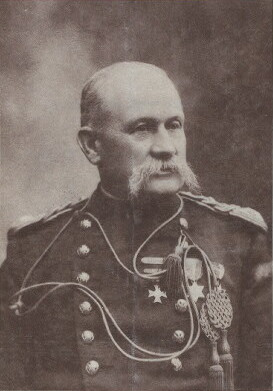
- Born: November 13, 1836; New Utrecht, New York, U.S.
- Died: April 22, 1919 (aged 82); Plainfield, New Jersey, U.S.
- Military career
- Branch: United States Army
- Service years: 1862–1904
- Rank: Colonel
- Unit: 5th New York Independent Light Artillery
- Commands: 9th Infantry Regiment
- Conflicts: American Civil War: Maryland campaign; Battle of Harpers Ferry; Lynchburg campaign; Battle of Lynchburg; Sheridan's Shenandoah Valley campaign; Battle of Cedar Creek; Modoc War; Spanish–American War: Santiago campaign; Battle of San Juan Hill

William Henry Boyle (1836–1919) was an American colonel of the American Civil War, the Indian Wars and the Spanish–American War. He participated in several battles in both wars, notably commanding the 9th Infantry Regiment during the Battle of San Juan Hill.

== American Civil War ==
William was born on November 13, 1836, at New Utrecht, Brooklyn as the son of Nathaniel Boyle and Margaret L. Stillwell Boyle. He enlisted in the 5th New York Independent Light Artillery on January 19, 1862. Promoted to 1st Lieutenant, he served under George Crook and Philip Sheridan, receiving praise from both of them during his service. Boyle was promoted to major in 1865 and participated at the battles of Harpers Ferry, Lynchburg and Cedar Creek.

== Indian wars ==
Boyle continued to serve in the United States Army, being made a Second Lieutenant and sent to the Umatilla Indian Reservation from 1869 to 1871 as an agent. Initially dispatched to deal with the Yavapai War in 1872, he returned to the Department of the Columbia to fight in the Modoc War as an Adjutant and Field Quartermaster until 1873. In 1877, Boyle was given command of Fort Lapwai and began negotiations with Chief Joseph to prevent war with the Nez Perce. Elsewhere, he participated in conflicts with the Bannocks and the Northern Paiutes until June 1884 when he was transferred to Fort Sidney and Fort Randall. In 1883, as Boyle was prepared for promotion to captain, efforts on trying to find Boyle's date of birth remained in mystery as by 1895, it ranged from 1832 to 1838.

== Later years ==
Along with Ezra P. Ewers, Boyle was initially given command of the 9th Infantry Regiment during the Battle of San Juan Hill but later given command of the 6th Artillery Regiment. Despite retiring from active service as a colonel on 1904, Boyle was made a candidate to succeed Captain Quincy O. M. Gillmore to organize the New York Militia on June 12, 1906, after Captain Merch B. Stewart was deemed to be unavailable but Boyle personally denied the request. He died on April 22, 1919, at Plainfield, New Jersey and was buried at Arlington National Cemetery along with his wife, Elizabeth Cropsey Boyle.
