= 214th Pennsylvania Infantry Regiment =

Union Army infantry regiment

214th Pennsylvania Volunteer Infantry
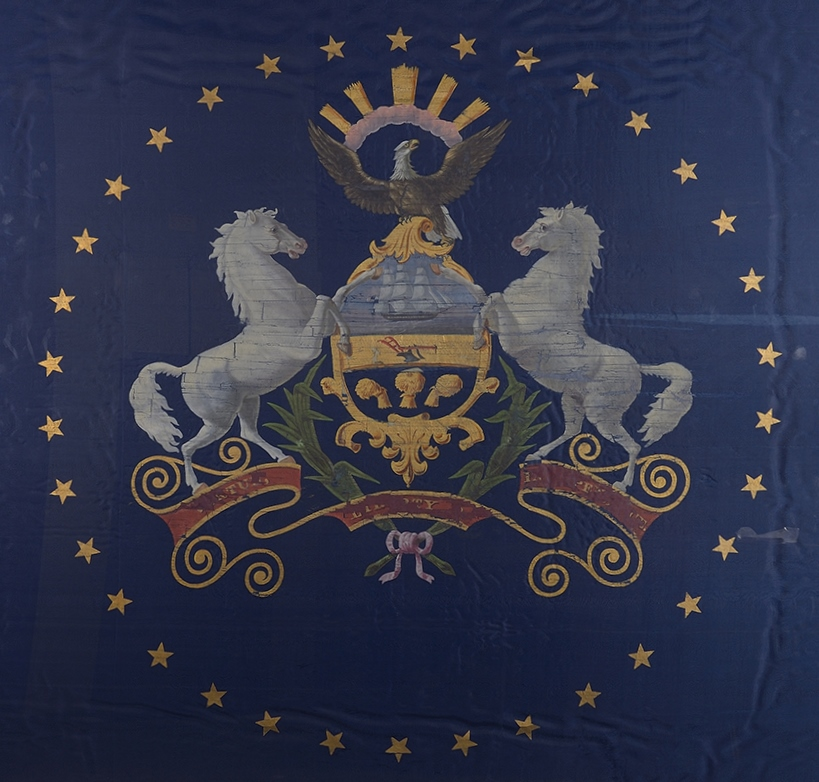
- State Flag of Pennsylvania, circa 1863.
- Active: March 1865 – 21 March 1866
- Country: United States of America
- Allegiance: Union
- Branch: Union Army
- Role: Infantry
- Size: 1,400 (mustered in)

The 214th Regiment Pennsylvania Volunteer Infantry also knowns as the 8th Union League was an infantry regiment of the Union Army in the American Civil War. It was raised in Philadelphia close to the end of the war, and spent its year of service on guard duty in the Shenandoah Valley and Washington, D.C.

== History ==
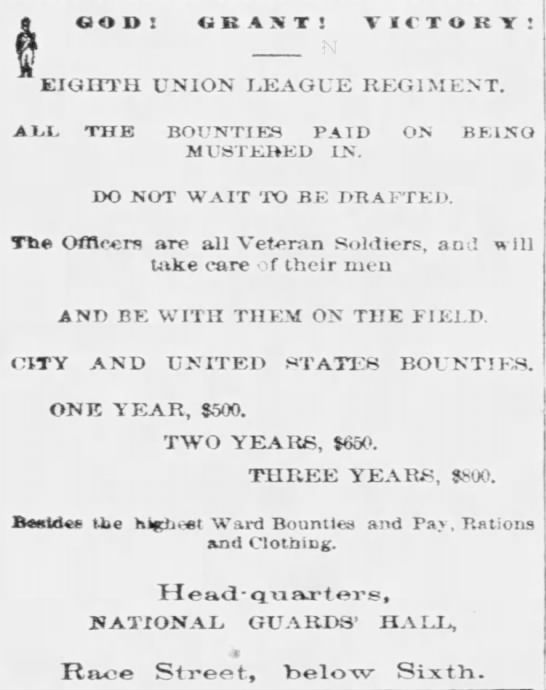
A newspaper recruiting advertisement for the regiment

The 1,400-strong 214th Pennsylvania Infantry was organized at Philadelphia in March 1865, with men from that city and the counties of Lancaster and Northampton, under the command of Regular Army officer Colonel David B. McKibbin. It was raised by the Union League for a one-year term of service to replace returning veteran units, and was also known as the 8th Union League Regiment. Though most of the regiment was from Philadelphia, Company H was recruited at Easton in Northampton County. After completing its organization, the regiment left Philadelphia on 8 April for the Shenandoah Valley, where it engaged in guard and provost duty until July as part of the 2nd Brigade, 3rd Division, Army of the Shenandoah. It was ordered to Washington, D.C. to garrison the city as part of the XXII Corps in July, and a detachment under Major Washington M. Worrall was sent to Annapolis to command the post there in November. The regiment was mustered out at Washington on 21 March 1866; it was the last Pennsylvania regiment mustered out. During its service, 24 men of the regiment died of disease.

== See also ==
- List of Pennsylvania Civil War regiments
- Pennsylvania in the Civil War
