= Samuel D. Rockenbach =

United States Army general

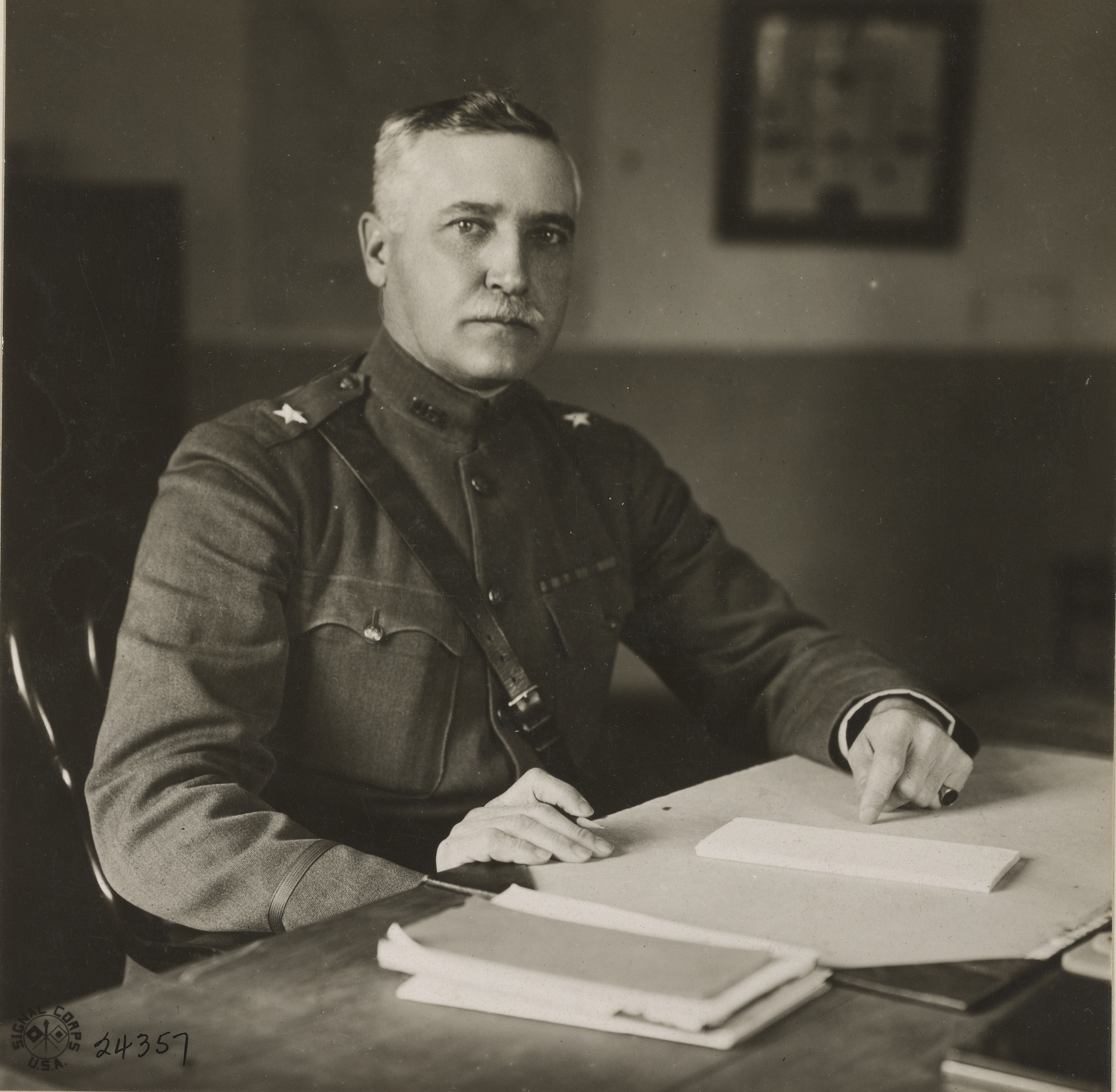
- Official portrait, c. 1918
- Born: Samuel Dickerson Rockenbach; January 27, 1869; Lynchburg, Virginia, U.S.
- Died: May 16, 1952 (aged 83); Washington, D.C., U.S.
- Burial place: Arlington National Cemetery
- Spouse: Emma Baldwin (m. 1898–1945, her death)
- Relatives: Theodore Anderson Baldwin (father-in-law)
- Military career
- Branch: United States Army
- Service years: 1891–1933
- Rank: Brigadier General
- Service number: 0-397
- Unit: Cavalry Branch
- Commands: Base Section Number 1, Saint-Nazaire, France; Tank Corps; Tank School; Military District of Washington; 2nd Cavalry Brigade; 2nd Field Artillery Brigade
- Conflicts: American Indian Wars; Pancho Villa Expedition; Spanish–American War; World War I
- Awards: Army Distinguished Service Medal
- Other work: Commandant, Kemper Military School

Samuel Dickerson Rockenbach (27 January 1869 – 16 May 1952) was a United States Army officer and father of the Tank Corps.

== Biography ==
He was born in Lynchburg, Virginia on January 27, 1869, the son of Frank J. Rockenbach and Jane Nicolson Rockenbach. He attended the Virginia Military Institute, where he graduated third in the class of 1889 and was designated a distinguished graduate.

In 1898, Rockenbach married Emma Baldwin, who was the daughter of Theodore Anderson Baldwin.

Rockenbach was the commander of Kemper Military School and also served in the Missouri Militia. He received a commission in the United States Cavalry in 1891. He served repeatedly with Brigadier General John J. Pershing, including serving as quartermaster during the Pancho Villa Expedition. In 1912, Rockenbach graduated from the United States Army War College.

=== During World War I ===
In December 1917, eight months after the American entry into World War I, he was appointed by Pershing, now the Commander-in-Chief of the American Expeditionary Forces (AEF) on the Western Front, to command the Tank Corps.

In 1918, Rockenbach organized, trained, equipped, and deployed the first American tank units to the European Western Front during World War I.

=== After World War I ===
He remained chief of the Tanks Corps until 1920. He directed the tank school at Fort Meade, Maryland until 1924.

From 1928 to his retirement in 1933, he commanded the Second Artillery Brigade at Fort Sam Houston, Texas.

Rockenbach died on May 16, 1952.

== Awards ==
Rockenbach received the Army Distinguished Service Medal. The citation for the medal reads:

The President of the United States of America, authorized by Act of Congress, July 9, 1918, takes pleasure in presenting the Army Distinguished Service Medal to Brigadier General Samuel D. Rockenbach, United States Army, for exceptionally meritorious and distinguished services to the Government of the United States, in a duty of great responsibility during World War I. As Quartermaster of Base Section No. 1, St. Nazaire, from June to December 1917, General Rockenbach rendered especially valuable services. Confronted with a problem of great magnitude, be fraught with serious difficulties, he went about his task with keen determination, and by his energy and great zeal organized and efficiently operated the first American base in France. Later, as Chief of the Tank Corps, by his tireless energy and keen determination he established schools of training for tank personnel and laid the foundation for the organization of the tank units. He ably directed the operations of the tanks with the First Army and contributed in a measure to the success attained.

In addition, he was a recipient of the French Croix de Guerre and Officer of the Legion of Honor awards, and the Commander of the Order of the Bath from Great Britain.

== Legacy ==
His papers are held by the Virginia Military Institute.
