= Bear Valley raid =

1886 event during Geronimo's War

Coordinates: 31.4339°N 111.1814°W

Raid on Bear Valley
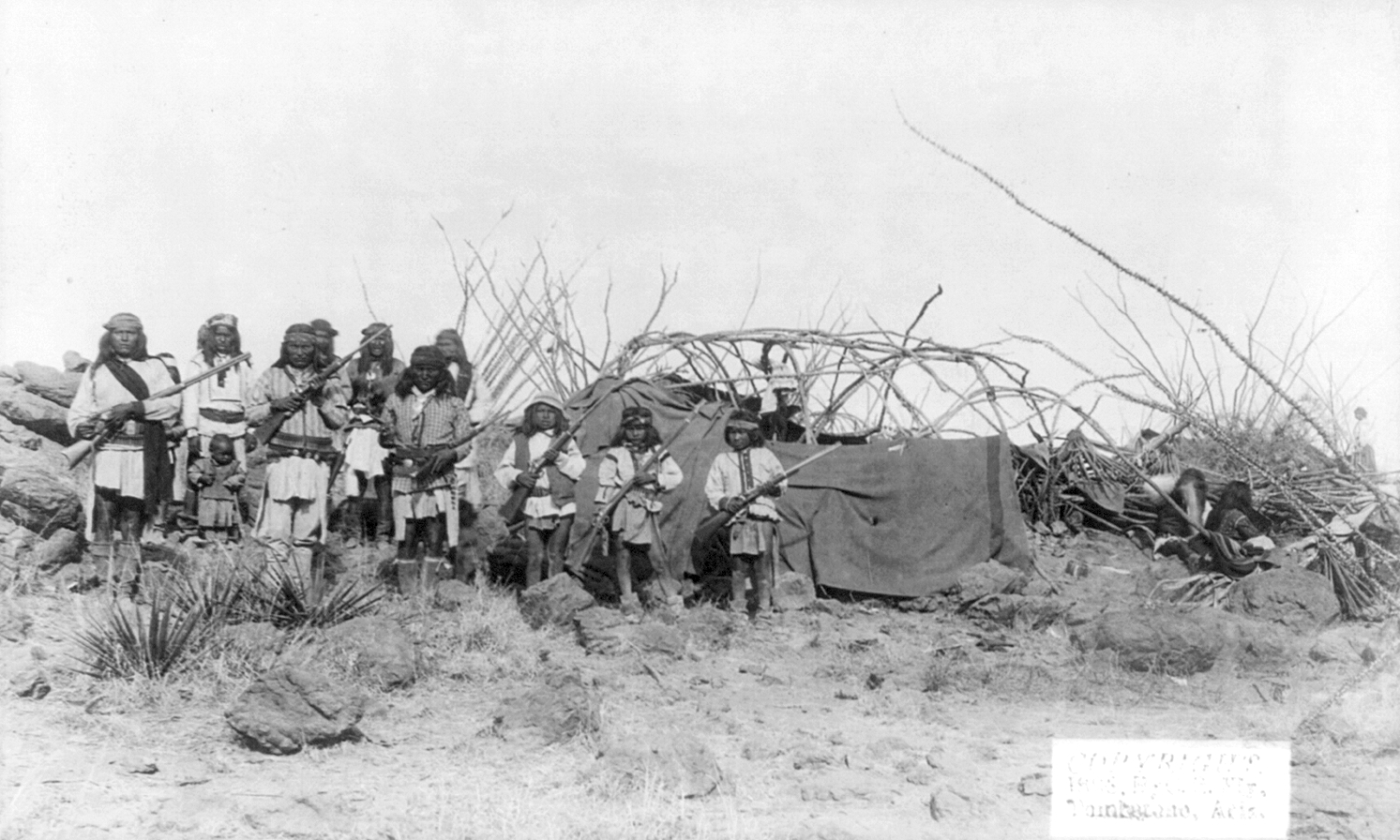
- Naiche and his band at Geronimo's camp on March 27, 1886, shortly before their surrender to General George Crook. Geronimo and his followers did not stay in army custody for long and they later escaped, leading to a final surrender at Skeleton Canyon in September 1886. Photograph taken by C. S. Fly.
- Date: April 27–28, 1886
- Location: near Arivaca, Arizona
- Outcome: 4 killed 1 wounded 1 captured

The raid on Bear Valley was an armed conflict that occurred in 1886 during Geronimo's War. In late April, a band of Chiricahua Apaches attacked settlements in Santa Cruz County, Arizona over the course of two days. The Apaches raided four cattle ranches in or around Bear Valley, leaving four settlers dead, including a woman and her baby. They also captured a young girl, who was found dead several days after the event, and stole or destroyed a large amount of private property. When the United States Army learned of the attack, an expedition was launched to pursue the hostiles. In May, two small skirmishes were fought just across the international border in Sonora, Mexico but both times the Apaches were able to escape capture.

== Raid ==
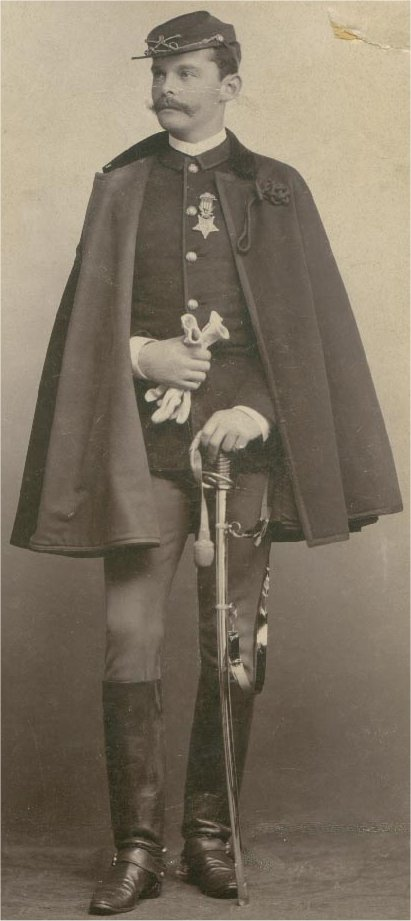
Lieutenant Powhatan Clarke wearing his Medal of Honor sometime before his death in 1893.

The raid occurred during the final campaign of the war, in which thousands of soldiers and militia searched the frontier for a small band of Chiricahuas from San Carlos. Most of the natives followed the warrior Geronimo, though there were other leaders who led their own groups. The Apaches, after escaping the reservations, would usually retreat to their strongholds in the Sierra Madre of northern Mexico. From there they would raid against the Mexicans or cross the international border to raid in the United States, as was the situation in Bear Valley. The valley is a large region located in southern Arizona, just north of the border with Sonora, and west of Nogales, making it the ideal target for Apache raiders in northern Mexico. Geronimo, sometime after his surrender, said he did not lead the attack which meant if it wasn't him it was likely perpetrated by the warrior Naiche, the eldest son of the famous Chief Cochise. However, Geronimo was said to have been raiding in the area at the time. When the Apaches entered Bear Valley, they first attacked two men who were traveling through the desert near Oro Blanco. The men were A. L. Peck and his assistant, Charles Owen. They were ambushed about two miles from Peck's ranch in Agua Fria Canyon. Owen was shot and killed immediately but Peck was taken prisoner. The hostiles tied Peck to a tree and kept him under guard for about an hour before setting him free without his shoes. Peck then ran barefoot back to his home where he found that the house was destroyed and that his wife and eleven-month-old baby had been murdered. Peck also found that his twelve-year-old niece had been captured. She was held prisoner by the Apaches until late June 1886, when she was rescued by Mexican Militiamen and subsequently reunited with her parents.

After the attack on Peck's ranch the Apaches continued on towards Sycamore Canyon and the nearby homesteads, some twenty miles south of Arivaca. One of the homesteads was the cattle ranch of John "Yank" Bartlett and his partner Henry "Hank" Hewitt, located at the head of the canyon. On April 28, the day after the attack at Peck's ranch, a local man named Phil Shanahan was visiting the Bartlett ranch where his ten-year-old son, Little Phil Shanahan, was staying with Johnny Bartlett, the son of Yank Bartlett. Eventually Shanahan decided to ride back to his ranch, a few miles away, leaving his son, Little Phil, at the Bartlett ranch. Shortly after that the boys heard gunfire in the distance and then Shanahan stumbled back into view of the ranch house saying he had been shot. Yank could tell by the wound that Shanahan needed a doctor so he told his son Johnny to ride to Oro Blanco to get help and alarm the townspeople. Yank also told Little Phil to go back to his home and warn his mother and his sisters. Phil made it to his house without incident and he took his family into the mountains where they hid until the following day. But, while the Shanahans were in hiding, the raiders attacked their house, stealing food, clothing and killing some cattle. Not long after Johnny left, he discovered three men "dressed in black and acting as if they were drunk." Afraid, Johnny turned around and went back, only to find that the Apaches had arrived and were firing into the house. Johnny rode through the firing to the door of the house, he was not hurt but his horse was wounded and died in the doorway. Yank returned the Apache's fire, while at the same time trying to tend to Shanahan's wound, and received a bullet to one of his shoulders, but he remained conscious and continued to fight. When it was dark, Yank sent Johnny out to ride to Oro Blanco again.

For the first two miles Johnny walked barefoot, so as to avoid making too much noise, until he reached the ranch of E.W. Smith. Johnny found that the ranch house had been broken into and that black clothing, a gun, and a bottle of brandy had been taken. Smith was found just after, he had apparently hidden, or was elsewhere, when the Apaches attacked. Smith joined Johnny and together the rode to Oro Blanco, arriving at 2:00 am the next morning. Meanwhile, Yank was able to fend off the attackers so when Johnny returned with help the hostiles were already gone.

== Aftermath ==
For their bravery, both Little Phil Shanahan and Johnny Bartlett received a commemorative rifle from the citizens of Santa Cruz County who regarded the boys as heroes. Five people were killed as result of the raid, including Phil Shanahan, who died of his wound, and the twelve-year-old niece of Arthur L. Peck. The Agua Fria Canyon was later renamed Peck Canyon and today the creek near Yank's ranch house is known as Yank's Spring, foundations of the house still remain intact and mark the beginning of a trail leading through Sycamore Canyon.

When the army learned of the raid, Captain Thomas C. Lebo and Troop K of the 10th Cavalry were sent after the Apaches. Captain Lebo picked up the hostiles' trail near the Bartlett ranch and tracked the raiders south for over 200 miles before finally catching up with them on May 3, in the Pinito Mountains of Sonora, Mexico. During the trek, the Buffalo Soldiers counted thirty dead horses the Apaches had ridden to death. A small battle was fought as the Apaches fired on the cavalrymen from the top of a steep hill. The first volley killed a private named Hollis and wounded a corporal named Scott. Under accurate fire from the Apaches, Lieutenant Powhatan Clarke rescued Corporal Scott by dragging him to safety. For this, Clarke later received the Medal of Honor. After several hours of fighting, the hostiles retreated further into the Mexican wilderness, having lost two killed and one wounded. Several other army units became involved at that point but it was Captain Charles A.P. Hatfield and Company D, 4th Cavalry, that eventually found the Apaches encamped on May 15, near the village of Santa Cruz, between the Santa Cruz and San Pedro Rivers. A second skirmish ensued in which the cavalry charged and routed the hostiles, killing or wounded at least one man and capturing their horses and camping equipment. However, shortly after Hatfield decided to make for the nearby village of Santa Cruz, his command was ambushed five miles from the town while they were stopped at an animal watering hole. Two Americans were killed in the fight, a cook and a blacksmith, and two sergeants were wounded, one of them, Samuel Henry Craig, later received the Medal of Honor for his "conspicuous gallantry." Again the Apaches retreated and they weren't captured until the end of the war in September when Geronimo surrendered.

== See also ==
- Battle of Bear Valley
- Skeleton Canyon Massacres
