= David B. McKibbin =

United States Army officer

David Bell McKibbin
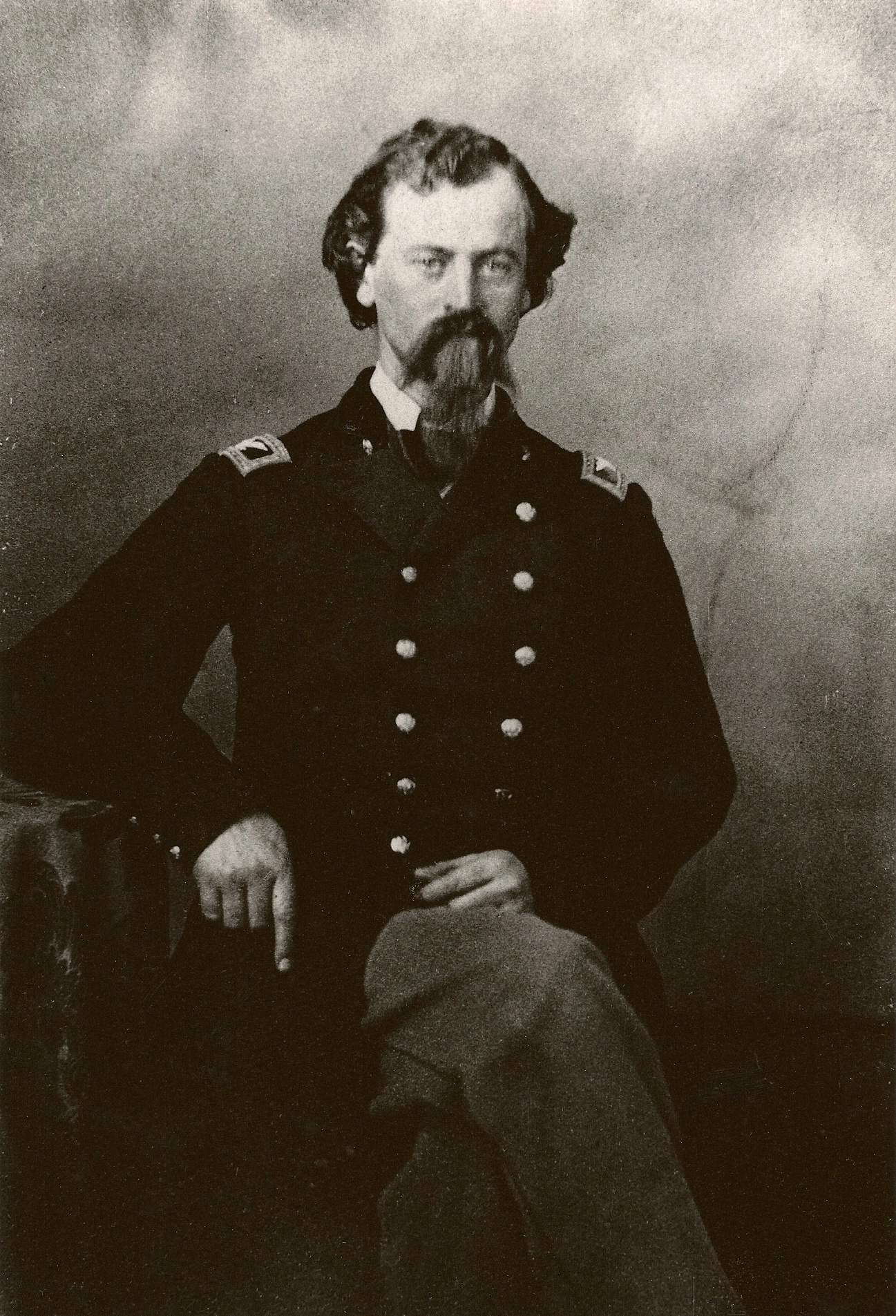
- McKibbin c. 1863 while commander of the 158th Pennsylvania Infantry
- Born: 5 April 1831; Pittsburgh, Pennsylvania, United States
- Died: 8 November 1890 (aged 59); Washington, D.C., United States
- Burial place: Arlington National Cemetery
- Military career
- Allegiance: United States
- Branch: United States Army
- Service years: 1848; 1855–1875
- Rank: Colonel (Pennsylvania Volunteers); Brevet Brigadier General
- Commands: 158th Pennsylvania Infantry; 14th United States Infantry; 214th Pennsylvania Infantry
- Conflicts: Mexican–American War; Puget Sound War; American Civil War

David Bell McKibbin (5 April 1831 – 8 November 1890) was a United States Army officer who was made a brevet brigadier general in the final weeks of the American Civil War.

Born to a local politician in Pittsburgh, McKibbin studied at the United States Military Academy and served in the Mexican–American War, but resigned due to poor health. He rejoined the regular army in 1855 and served in Washington Territory, fighting in the Puget Sound War before going east when the American Civil War broke out in 1861. As a company and battalion commander in the 14th Infantry Regiment, McKibbin fought with the Army of the Potomac in the Seven Days Battles, the Second Battle of Bull Run, and the Battle of Antietam.

He commanded the 158th Pennsylvania Infantry in Virginia and North Carolina from late 1862 to mid-1863, and commanded the 14th Infantry for less than a month from May 1864 to his capture at the Battle of Bethesda Church. While a prisoner of war, McKibbin was brevetted twice for his actions during the Overland Campaign. He was exchanged late that year and returned to the 14th Infantry as a battalion commander, but did not go back into combat. In the northern hemisphere spring of 1865 McKibbin was made a brevet brigadier general in recognition of his war service, and commanded the 214th Pennsylvania Infantry on garrison duty after the end of the war. Postwar, he continued his army career but retired due to health conditions arising from his time as a prisoner of war.

== Early life and antebellum service ==
McKibbin was born in Pittsburgh on 5 April 1831, the sixth child of local Democratic politician and financier Chambers McKibbin and Jane Bell McKibbin. His brothers included Joseph C. McKibbin, Chambers McKibbin, and Robert P. McKibbin, all of whom also served as Army officers. He entered and was accepted to the United States Military Academy at West Point from Pennsylvania on 1 July 1846, going on sick leave from 4 November 1847 to June 1848, during a portion of which he served in the Mexican–American War as a volunteer aide-de-camp to General James Bankhead. Following his return to West Point, McKibbin resigned on 31 October 1848 as a result of Mexican fever contracted during his service. He was appointed a 2nd lieutenant in the newly activated 9th Infantry on 3 March 1855, and was on recruiting duty until 7 July after which he served with the regiment at Fort Monroe until 15 December. McKibbin was sent to California via the Isthmus of Panama with the regiment, serving with the regiment in Washington Territory during the Puget Sound War. Mentioned for bravery in combat, he commanded the escort to the Astronomical Party of the Northwestern Boundary Commission from 22 July to 8 December 1858.

== American Civil War ==
As tensions increased in the leadup to the American Civil War, McKibbin was promoted to 1st lieutenant on 1 March 1861. Following the outbreak of the war, he was ordered to Washington, D.C. on 21 April to report to the Secretary of War and became a captain on 14 May, commanding Company H in the newly created 14th Infantry. McKibbin was placed on mustering duty for the regiment at Trenton, New Jersey and Elmira, New York from 7 June, and was on recruiting duty for it from August until 29 September. He was sent to the Army of the Potomac with the regiment, distinguishing himself at the Battle of Gaines's Mill and in the rest of the Seven Days Battles during the Peninsula Campaign while fighting alongside his brother Chambers. Wounded in the head during the Second Battle of Bull Run on 30 August 1862, he commanded the 2nd Battalion of the regiment at the Battle of Antietam on 17 September, during which it supported artillery batteries at Antietam Creek.

McKibbin became Colonel of the 158th Pennsylvania Infantry on 24 November, leading it in Virginia and as part of the Keystone Brigade of the District of Pamlico in the Department of North Carolina. After the regiment was mustered out on 12 August 1863, McKibbin served as an aide-de-camp to General Romeyn B. Ayres, commander of the 2nd Division of V Corps of the Army of the Potomac, between 25 September and November, and was on duty at the draft rendezvous in Madison, Wisconsin until May 1864. He assumed command of the 14th Infantry, now reduced to battalion strength, upon his return in May, but was wounded twice and captured at the Battle of Bethesda Church during the Overland Campaign on 2 June 1864.

He was made a brevet major and a brevet lieutenant colonel on 1 August 1864 for his "gallant service" at the Battles of North Anna and Bethesda Church, respectively. McKibbin was imprisoned successively at Libby Prison, at Camp Oglethorpe in Macon, Georgia, and at Camp Sorghum in Charleston, South Carolina until paroled in October, but remained at Camp Parole until exchanged in December. After serving with the 14th Infantry in New York until February 1865, McKibbin remained on recruiting duty in New York until April; he was promoted to brevet colonel and brevet brigadier general (both Volunteer and Regular Army) on 13 March 1865 for "gallant and meritorious service" during the war. McKibbin became the Colonel of the 214th Pennsylvania Infantry on 5 April and led it in the Army of the Shenandoah and in the garrison of Washington, D.C. until it was mustered out on 30 April 1866.

== Later life ==
McKibbin was on leave until August 1866, and transferred to the 32nd Infantry on 21 September, then became a major of the 10th Infantry on 15 September 1867. He commanded the post of Davids' Island while on recruiting duty from August 1866 to 2 September 1868, after which he went on leave again until 15 March 1869. After spending a couple months awaiting orders, McKibbin served on reconstruction duty in Virginia until February 1870. While on recruiting duty until January 1871, he transferred to the 10th Cavalry on 31 December 1870.

McKibbin received permission to delay moving to his new assignment and took a leave of absence until 26 March 1871, joining the regiment in the Indian Territory until 1 August, when he went on sick leave with a surgeon's certificate of disability, which lasted until 5 January 1872. Returning to the regiment, McKibbin left on 11 December for leave that lasted up to 8 February 1873, then rejoined it in Texas but again went on sick leave with a certificate of disability from 28 November to 10 July 1874. McKibbin served at Fort Richardson until 26 September, when he went on sick leave before retiring on 31 May 1875 due to "chronic rheumatism and paralysis of the left side", a result of his time as a prisoner of war. He died of throat cancer at the Garfield Memorial Hospital in Washington, D.C. on 8 November 1890, being buried at the Arlington National Cemetery.

== Personal life ==
McKibben married Jennie Frances Young before the Civil War; their son, Chambers Hawthrone, who went on to become an Army officer, was born at Fort Steilacoom on 15 January 1861 while McKibben was stationed in Washington Territory. Jennie died in childbirth in Philadelphia at age 24 on 19 June 1862 with a stillborn daughter. After the Civil War ended, he married Marion Wolfersberger, who survived him and died on 11 February 1901, being buried beside him at the Arlington National Cemetery.

Following the end of the Civil War, McKibbin became an active member of the Military Order of the Loyal Legion of the United States, an association of Union officer veterans.
