= Powhatan Henry Clarke =

United States Army first lieutenant

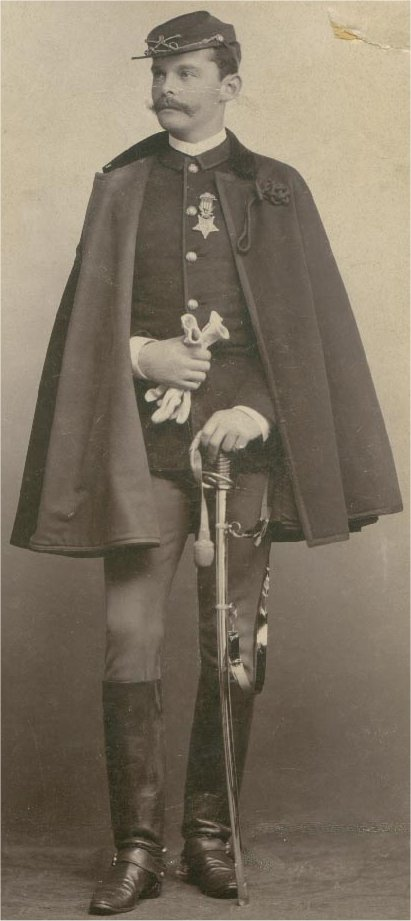
- Powhatan Henry Clarke wearing his Medal of Honor
- Born: October 9, 1862; Alexandria, Louisiana
- Died: July 21, 1893 (aged 30); Fort Custer, Montana
- Burial place: Calvary Cemetery; St. Louis, Missouri
- Military career
- Allegiance: United States of America
- Branch: United States Army
- Service years: 1884–1893
- Rank: First Lieutenant
- Units: 10th U.S. Cavalry; 9th U.S. Cavalry
- Conflicts: Apache Wars: Geronimo Campaign; Lebo Expedition; Cherry Creek Campaign
- Awards: Medal of Honor

Powhatan Henry Clarke (October 9, 1862 – July 21, 1893) was a United States Army first lieutenant who was a recipient of the Medal of Honor during the Geronimo Campaign in Sonora, Mexico. He received the medal for rescuing a wounded soldier on May 3, 1886.

Clarke was the subject of art by Frederic Remington - "Lieutenant Powhatan H Clarke Tenth Cavalry" and "Soldiering in the Southwest–The Rescue of Corporal Scott".

== Life ==
Clarke was born at Ulster Plantation, Boyce, Louisiana on October 9, 1862. He was the grandson of U.S. federal judge Henry Boyce and Irene Archinard, and the son of Louise Frances Boyce and Dr. (Professor) Powhatan Clarke. He partly studied in France. He graduated from the United States Military Academy in 1884.

Clarke was a second lieutenant in the 10th Cavalry Regiment of the Buffalo Soldiers at Fort Davis, Texas. On May 3, 1886, he rescued one of his wounded soldiers, Corporal Edward Scott, who was under heavy fire from Apaches at Pinito Mountains, Sonora. He received a Medal of Honor for this action.

He was the commander of Apache Scouts until 1891. That same year, he became a compatriot of the District of Columbia Society of the Sons of the American Revolution and was assigned national membership number 1976.

In 1891, he became First Lieutenant and he was transferred to the 9th Cavalry Regiment. From 1891 to 1892 he was an observer, stationed at Düsseldorf, Germany with a Westphalian Hussar regiment. The discipline of the German Army greatly impressed him.

He was back with the 10th Cavalry by early 1892. From 1892 until his death in 1893, he lived in Fort Custer, Montana. In 1892 he married Elizabeth Clemens of St. Louis, Missouri; they had one son. After diving into shallow water and striking his head, Clarke drowned in the Little Bighorn River on July 21, 1893, and was buried at Calvary Cemetery in St. Louis, Missouri.

Clarke's granddaughter, Bayard Wootten of New Bern North Carolina, was a photographer. Clarke's sister was a writer.

== Medal of Honor citation ==
Rank and organization: Second Lieutenant, 10th U.S. Cavalry. Place and date: At Pinito Mountains, Sonora, Mex., May 3, 1886. Entered service at: Baltimore, Md. Birth: Alexandria, La. Date of issue: March 12, 1891.

Citation:

Rushed forward to the rescue of a soldier who was severely wounded and lay, disabled, exposed to the enemy's fire, and carried him to a place of safety.

== See also ==
- List of Medal of Honor recipients
- List of Medal of Honor recipients for the Indian Wars

== Bibliography ==
- Thrapp, Dan L. (1991). Encyclopedia of Frontier Biography: A–F. Lincoln, NE: University of Nebraska Press. ISBN 0-8032-9418-2.
