= Cam Theaker =

English footballer

Personal information
- Full name: Clarence Alfred Theaker
- Date of birth: 8 December 1912
- Place of birth: Spalding, England
- Date of death: 1992 (aged 79–80)
- Height: 5 ft 10 in (1.78 m)
- Position: Goalkeeper

Senior career*
Years	Team	Apps	(Gls)
1933	Spalding United		
1933–1938	Grimsby Town	5	(0)
1938–1947	Newcastle United	13	(0)
1947–1948	Hartlepools United	14	(0)
- * Club domestic league appearances and goals

Clarence Alfred "Cam" Theaker (8 December 1912 – 1992) was an English professional footballer who played as a goalkeeper.
