= Thomas C. Lebo =

American general (1842–1910)

Thomas Coverly Lebo
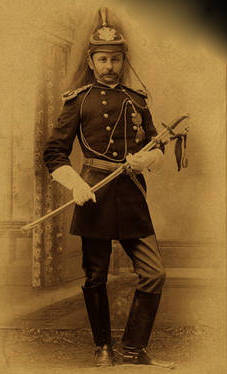
- Lebo within the 10th Cavalry Regiment
- Born: Thomas Coverly Lebo; December 17, 1842; Potters Mills, Pennsylvania, U.S.
- Died: February 14, 1910 (aged 67); Chicago, Illinois, U.S.
- Burial place: Oak Woods Cemetery, Chicago, Illinois, U.S.
- Spouse: Grace Frances Hawkes (m. 1903)
- Military career
- Allegiance: United States
- Branch: United States Army
- Service years: 1861–1865; 1867–1905
- Brigadier General: Brigadier General
- Nickname: "Tom" or "Tommy"
- Units: 11th Pennsylvania Infantry Regiment; 10th Cavalry Regiment
- Commands: 6th Cavalry Regiment
- Conflicts: American Civil War; Apache Wars; Spanish–American War: Santiago campaign; Battle of San Juan Hill; Philippine–American War
- Awards: Medal of Honor
- Other work: Public Service, Writing or Lecturing, Private Sector or Agriculture

Thomas Coverly Lebo (1842–1910) was an American brigadier general of the American Civil War, the American Indian Wars and the Spanish–American War. He was known for commanding the 6th Cavalry Regiment during the Battle of San Juan Hill and an officer of the 10th Cavalry Regiment during the American Indian Wars.

== American Civil War ==
Lebo was born on December 17, 1842, at Potters Mills, Pennsylvania as the son of Jacob G. and Susannah Coverly Lebo. He enlisted in the Union Army on April 26, 1861, as a second lieutenant within the 11th Pennsylvania Infantry Regiment. After being briefly mustered out on July 31, he returned on November 28, 1861, within the 1st Pennsylvania Cavalry Regiment and was promoted to first lieutenant on February 12, 1863. On December 13, 1864, he was transferred to Company F and was promoted to captain of the regiment. After being transferred to the 2nd Pennsylvania Provisional Cavalry Regiment on June 17, 1865, he was mustered out on August 7, 1865.

== American Indian Wars ==
He returned to service within the Regular Army on June 12, 1867, as a 1st lieutenant of the 10th Cavalry Regiment and was promoted to captain on May 17, 1876. During the American Indian Wars, Lebo commanded Company K of the regiment and was praised by fellow officer Powhatan Henry Clarke as he described Lebo as "a splendid soldier who takes pride in his troop even to this most minute detail." During the series of wars, Lebo pursued Geronimo after he attacked the ranch of Arthur L. Peck which resulted in the murders of Peck's wife Petra, his son Andy and his neighbor Charlie Owens which would later be known as the Raid on Bear Valley on April 27, 1886. His pursuit lead to a violent engagement between the Americans and Apache on May 3. After the engagement, he was then promoted to major of the 6th Cavalry Regiment on June 26, 1893.

== Spanish and Philippine-American Wars ==
Lebo would remain in the 6th Cavalry Regiment by the time the Spanish–American War broke out as he commanded the regiment during the Battle of San Juan Hill after its previous commander, Henry Carroll was wounded during the regiment's main charge. After the war, Lebo would be promoted to lieutenant colonel of the 1st Cavalry Regiment on September 14, 1899, and would serve within the regiment during the Philippine–American War. After his promotion to colonel of the 14th Cavalry Regiment on February 19, 1902, Lebo returned to the American mainland. (Note: Other sources state he was promoted to 1901 instead of 1902) By the next year, Lebo married Grace Frances Hawkes in Albuquerque. One day before his retirement on June 22, 1905, Lebo was promoted to brigadier general. He died on Chicago on February 14, 1910, at the age of 67.
