= Philip H. Ellis =

American colonel (1841–1914)

Philip Howard Ellis
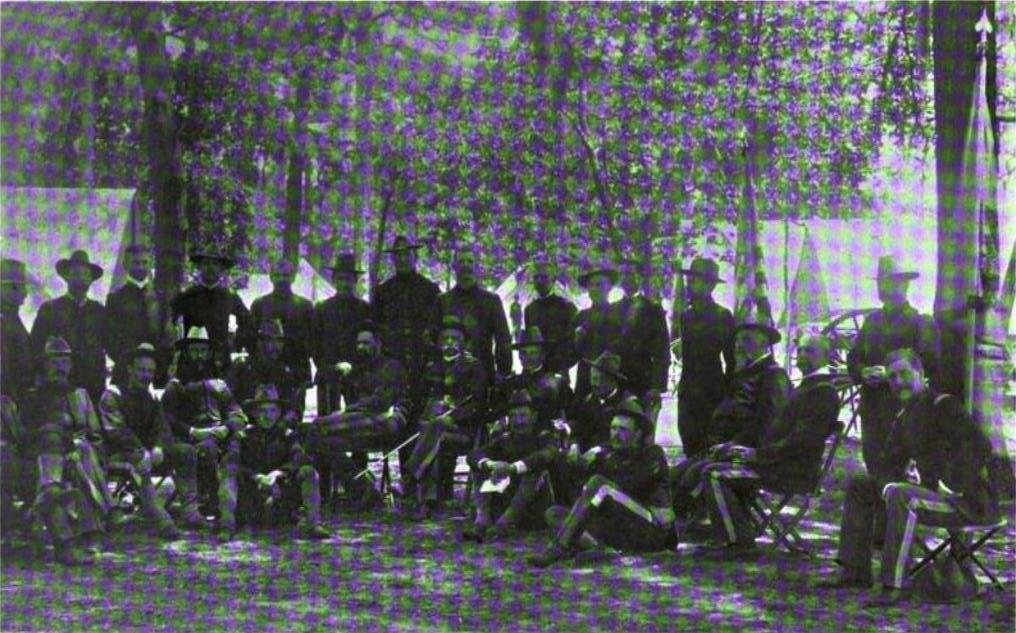
- The Officers of the 13th Infantry Regiment in 1893. Ellis himself was likely present.
- Born: October 23, 1841; Elkton, Maryland, U.S.
- Died: August 27, 1914 (aged 72); Atlantic City, New Jersey, U.S.
- Burial place: Elkton Cemetery; Elkton, Maryland, U.S.
- Military career
- Branch: United States Army
- Service years: 1866–1901
- Rank: Colonel
- Unit: 6th Pennsylvania Cavalry Regiment
- Commands: 13th Infantry Regiment
- Conflicts: American Civil War: Overland Campaign; Battle of Trevilian Station (WIA); Spanish–American War: Santiago campaign; Battle of San Juan Hill (WIA)

Philip Howard Ellis (1841-1914) was an American colonel of the Spanish–American War. He was known for being one of the main commanders of the 13th Infantry Regiment during the Spanish–American War as well as for his court-martial in 1872 before being acquitted of all charges.

== Initial Service ==
Ellis served in the Union Army during the American Civil War, enlisting for service into Company B of the 6th Pennsylvania Cavalry Regiment on November 11, 1862, as a private. He was wounded during the Battle of Trevilian Station and was mustered out on November 3, 1864. During his service in the war, Ellis was promoted to 2nd Lieutenant on May 1, 1863, and to 1st Lieutenant on March 12, 1864.

Ellis then signed up for service in the regular army at Maryland and was promoted from second to first lieutenant on December 28, 1866. Due to Capt. William G. Rankin being discharged on December 31, 1870, the Captain of the 13th Infantry Regiment remained vacant, and after Capt. Seth Bonney, the first nominee, retired, Ellis was chosen to fill the vacant spot. The order was confirmed on June 5, 1872.

== Court-Martial ==
On December 5, 1872, Ellis was accused of 3 charges while commanding Company D of the regiment within Camp Douglas. His first charge of "Conduct to the prejudice of good order and military discipline" included knocking out Private Patrick Durett of Company D with his fist, threatening Durett with his rifle, stating that "I have a mind to knock your damn brains out", and wounding Private John Carr with a sword strike. His second charge included "Disobedience of Orders" which included a double knockout of Private Durett during a military inspection, striking Private Carr, and threatened Durett as he stated: "You have been tried twice for being drunk on duty, and you have been drunk ever since you've came out of your guard-house and if a court-martial will not have any effect on you, I will see if something else will not." His third charge of "Conduct unbecoming an officer and a gentleman" as after his double knockout of Durett, he called him a "Goddamn son of a bitch" with many witnesses to the insult. Ellis declared himself "not guilty" of the charges presented to him, but the court found him guilty on all instances and charges with the verdict of "To be dismissed the service of the United States". However, General Edward Ord disputed the charge, claiming that Durett was an "incorrigable drunkard" along with stating that the scenario with Private Carr was "simply futile" due to his wound possibly being from his service during the American Civil War. Due to the disputes, Adjutant General Edward D. Townsend released Ellis from arrest and placed him back into active duty.

== Later years ==
By September 30, 1877, Ellis had the rank of Captain. On October 1, 1895, Ellis was promoted to major while within the 13th Infantry Regiment. During the Spanish–American War, Ellis was one of the main commanders of the Battle of San Juan Hill but was wounded during the battle. On September 18, 1898, Ellis was promoted to Lieutenant Colonel. After the war, Ellis was transferred to the 8th Infantry Regiment and was stationed at Fort Snelling from Columbia Barracks, Ohio on July 27, 1900. After being promoted to Colonel on January 23, 1901, Ellis retired from active service. Ellis died on August 27, 1914, while at Atlantic City, New Jersey.
