= 3rd New York Light Artillery Regiment =

- Active: 1861-1865
- Country: United States
- Allegiance: Union Army
- Role: Light Artillery
- Engagements: 1861 Defense of Washington; 1863; Expedition against Charleston SC; Siege of Fort Wagner; 1864; Petersburg Campaign; Richmond Campaign; 1865; Carolina Campaign; Occupation of Charleston, SC; Surrender of Gen. Joseph Johnston (Bennett's House); Occupation of Richmond Appomattox Court House

Commanders
- First Commander: Col. James H. Ledlie (1861-1862)
- Final Commander: Col. Charles H. Stewart (1862-1865)

The 3rd New York Light Artillery Regiment of the Union Army was originally mustered as the 19th New York Infantry Regiment at Elmira, New York on May 22, 1861. The regiment was enlisted on two year enlistment papers after an initial error of a three month enlistement. The 19th Infantry left New York in June under Col. John S. Clark but by December had been reformed as the 3rd New York Light Artillery under Col. James H. Ledlie.

As the 19th Infantry, it served near Washington. D. C, in June to December 1861. After becoming an artillery regiment, the batteries were scattered to various divisions, corps and departments across the east coast from the Carolinas to Washington, DC as the needs of the war required. In December of 1862, Col. Ledlie was promoted to brigadier general in command of the Artillery Brigade of the Department of North Carolina and Col. Charles H. Stewart (his deputy) was promoted to Colonel and took command until the unit was mustered out in 1865.

== Subordinate batteries ==
3rd New York Light Artillery Regiment Batteries

- Battery A - (Auburn, NY) Captain John T. Baker 1861-1863.
- Battery A - Captain Samuel P. Russell 1864-1865
- Battery B - (Auburn, NY) Captain Terrence J. Kennedy 1861-1862
- Battery B - (New York City) Captain Joseph J. Morrison 1862-1865
- Battery C - (Seneca Falls) Captain James E. Ashcroft 1861-1863
- Battery C - (Utica) Captain W E Mercer 1863-1865 (XVIII and XXIII Corps)
- Battery D - (Auburn, NY) Captain Owen Gavigan 1861-1863
- Battery D - (Syracuse) Captain Stephen Van Heusen 1864-1865
- Battery E - (Auburn) Captain Theodore H. Schenck 1861-1863 (XVIII and X Corps)
- Battery E - Captain George E. Ashby 1863-1865
- Battery F - (Moravia, NY) Captain Nelson T. Stephens 1861-1862
- Battery F - (Syracuse) Captain Edwin S. Jenney 1862-1865 (XVIII and X Corps)
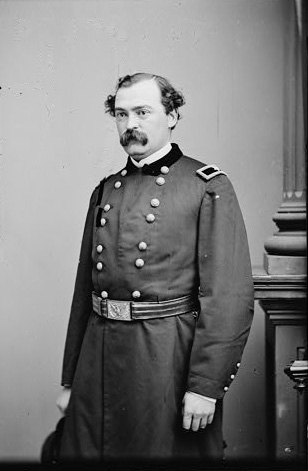
- Col. James Ledlie (photo taken of him as a Brigadier General)
  Battery G - (Auburn) Captain Chas H. Stewart 1861-1863 (XVIII Corps)
- Battery G - (Syracuse) Captain David L. Aberdeen 1864-1865 (XVIII, Department of Virginia and XXIII Corps)
- Battery H - (Weedsport, NY) Captain Solomon Giles 1861
- Battery H - (Rome, NY) Captain William J. Riggs 1862-1865
- Battery I - (Auburn) Captain John H. Ammon 1861-1863
- Battery I - Captain unknown 1863-1865 (XVIII and XXIII Corps)
- Battery K - (Union Springs, NY) Captain James R. Angel 1861
- Battery K - (Auburn) Captain James R. Angel 1861-1864 (XVIII Corps)
- Battery L - 1st Independent New York Artillery Battery never joined the regiment
- Battery M - (Albany) Captain James V. White 1862-1865 (XVIII, Army of the James and XXIII Corps)

== 3rd Field Artillery Regiment ==
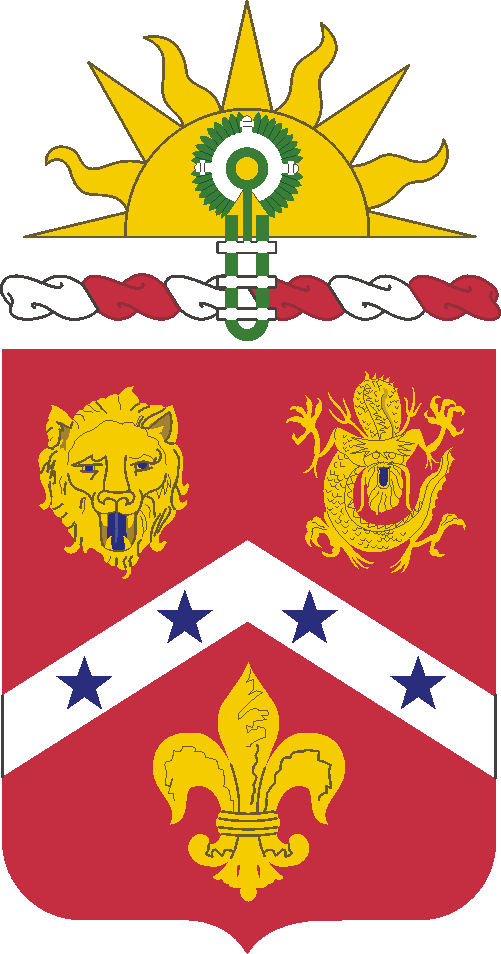
3rd Field Artillery Regiment Coat of Arms

The current US Army 3rd Field Artillery Regiment, while formed in 1907, traces its lineage back to the artillery regiments of New York and is credited for campaign streamers including Petersburg, Cold Harbor and the Peninsular Campaigns.

== See also ==
- List of New York units in the American Civil War
