= Charles D. Viele =

American Brigadier General (1841–1916)

Charles Delavan Viele
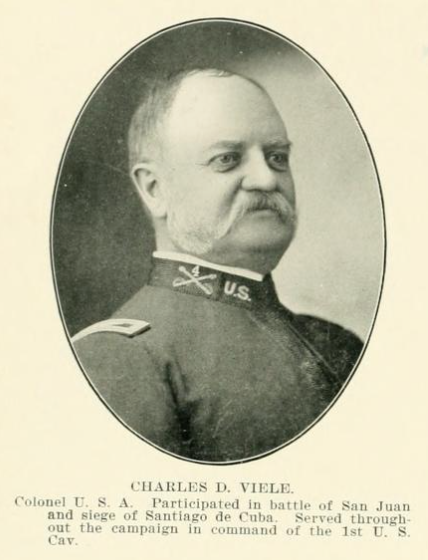
- Viele in 1898
- Born: February 7, 1841; Albany, New York, U.S.
- Died: October 6, 1916 (aged 75); Good Samaritan Hospital, Los Angeles, California
- Burial place: San Francisco National Cemetery, San Francisco, California, U.S.
- Military career
- Branch: United States Army
- Service years: 1861–1904
- Rank: Brigadier General
- Unit: V Corps
- Commands: 1st Cavalry Regiment
- Conflicts: American Civil War: Vicksburg campaign; Siege of Vicksburg; Red River campaign; Spanish–American War: Santiago campaign; Battle of San Juan Hill; Siege of Santiago

Charles Delavan Viele (February 7, 1841 – October 6, 1916) was an American brigadier general of Dutch descent during the American Civil War and the Spanish–American War. He was known for commanding the 1st Cavalry Regiment during the Battle of San Juan Hill and the Siege of Santiago.

== American Civil War ==
Viele was born on February 7, 1841, as the son of Rufus King and Phoebe Ann (née Gregory) Viele at Albany, New York. He is of Dutch descent, being a descendant of a Knickerbrocker family that arrived to New Amsterdam as early as 1639. Upon the outbreak of the American Civil War, Viele enlisted as a second lieutenant within the Regular Division of the V Corps. He was promoted to first lieutenant on April 6, 1862. For his service during the Siege of Vicksburg, Viele was brevetted to captain and would later command the 4th Cavalry Brigade during the Red River campaign under Nathan Dudley.

== Frontier service and Spanish–American War ==
On April 22, 1968, Viele was promoted to captain within the Regular Army and be part of the 10th Cavalry Regiment on January 1, 1871. While at Cincinnati, Ohio, on January 10, 1872, Viele married Nannie D. Minor. By August 6, 1873, Viele was stationed at Fort Griffin, Texas, while being intoxicated. He was then struck repeatedly with a sabre by William L. Foulk. This led to a court-martial against Foulk and despite pleading not guilty, Foulk was found guilty and dismissed from service in 1874. By 1894, Viele was a major and was promoted to lieutenant colonel on November 21, 1897. Upon the outbreak of the Spanish-American War, Viele was stationed at Fort Sheridian until he was ordered to head for Tampa, Florida, to embark for Cuba. This was later changed for Chickamauga, Georgia, where he remained for some time until being called for Tampa once again until his destination was switched to Lakeland, Florida, and he arrived there on June 7. Viele embarked with the rest of his regiment from Tampa on June 8, landing on Daiquirí, Oriente Province, on June 23 and began heading for Santiago de Cuba.

After participating in the Battle of San Juan Hill, Viele was promoted to brigadier general of volunteers for gallantry in service. He continued to command the 4th Cavalry Regiment during the Siege of Santiago. He remained at the camp by Santiago de Cuba from June 23 to August 8 and after the surrender of the city on August 17, he remained at the rear of Santiago de Cuba until September 8.

== Later career ==
After the war's conclusion, Viele was honorably discharged from volunteer service on November 30, 1898. He was promoted to colonel of the 4th Cavalry Regiment on September 14, 1899. Despite retiring on January 23, 1900, due to disability, Viele was promoted to brigadier general in 1904 for his service in the American Civil War. On June 1, 1907, Viele was made the junior vice-commander as part of the Commandery of the State of California. Viele died on October 6, 1916, at the Good Samaritan Hospital.
