= Richard Comba =

US Army brigadier general (1837–1907)

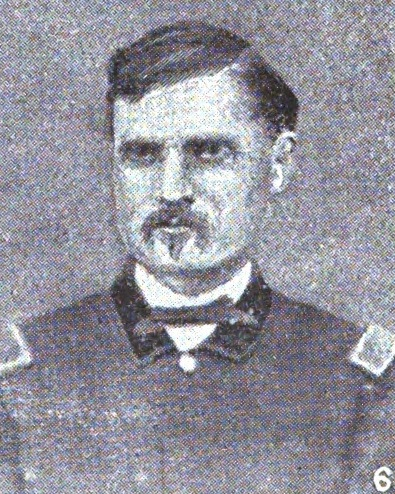
- 1889 illustration of Comba as a captain
- Born: 11 July 1837; County Limerick, Ireland
- Died: 29 March 1907 (aged 69); San Francisco, California, US
- Burial place: San Francisco National Cemetery
- Spouse: Francis Mary "Fannie" Logan (m. 1874–1907)
- Children: 3
- Military career
- Allegiance: United States; Union (American Civil War)
- Service: United States Army; Union Army
- Service years: 1855–1861, 1865–1901 (US Army); 1861–1865 (Union Army)
- Rank: Brigadier General
- Unit: US Army Infantry Branch
- Commands: US Army Post, Marianna, Florida; Fort Brooke, Florida; Company D, 7th Infantry Regiment; 12th Infantry Regiment; 2nd Brigade, 1st Division, Fourth Army Corps; 5th Infantry Regiment; Province of Abra, Philippines
- Wars: Utah War; American Indian Wars; American Civil War; Spanish–American War; Philippine–American War

Richard Comba (11 July 1837 – 29 March 1907) was a career officer in the United States Army. A veteran of the American Indian Wars, American Civil War, Spanish–American War, and Philippine–American War, he served from 1855 to 1901 and attained the rank of brigadier general. Comba's commands included the 12th Infantry Regiment and 5th Infantry Regiment.

== Biography ==
Richard Comba was born in Limerick, Ireland on 11 July 1837. He was raised and educated in Ireland and immigrated to the United States in 1854. He was 17 when he claimed an 1834 birthdate so he would appear to be 21, the minimum age for enlisting in the military without parental consent, and he joined the United States Army as a private in January 1855. (Note: Comba eventually had his birth date corrected in army records; by 1903 publicly available sources gave the year as 1837.) Comba was assigned to the 7th Infantry Regiment and took part in the Utah War in 1858 and an expedition against the Navajo in New Mexico in the late 1850s and early 1860s. He was selected early in his career for non-commissioned officer leadership assignments, and he quickly advanced to corporal, sergeant, and first sergeant.

== Early career ==
The American Civil War started in April 1861 and in July, Confederate States Army forces under John R. Baylor compelled the surrender of Union Army troops including Comba at San Augustin Spring, New Mexico. The Union troops were soon paroled, after which he was stationed at Rouses Point, New York. In September 1862, he joined the Army of the Potomac and took part in engagements including the December 1862 Battle of Fredericksburg, at which he assumed command of his 7th Infantry company after its officers were killed or wounded.

In February 1863, Comba received a commission as a second lieutenant of Infantry. He remained with the 7th Infantry, which took part in the Battle of Chancellorsville in April–May 1863 and the Battle of Gettysburg in July 1863. He was wounded at Gettysburg and received brevet promotions to first lieutenant, captain, and major for his heroism during the fight. He performed recruiting duty beginning in September 1863, and was promoted to first lieutenant in October. He rejoined the regiment in October 1864 and served through the end of the war. Comba was promoted to captain in March 1865.

== Continued career ==
From December 1865 to April 1866, Comba commanded the post at Marianna, Florida. From April 1866 to April 1868, he commanded the post at Fort Brooke, Florida. In April 1868, he was assigned to the post at St. Augustine, Florida. Comba served extensively in the western states during the American Indian Wars and was the longtime commander of Company D, 7th Infantry Regiment. In August 1873, Comba was court-martialed after accusations that he had been drunk on duty; he pleaded guilty and was sentenced to be cashiered, but the sentence was commuted to a six month suspension and partial forfeiture of pay. He took part in the 1877 Battle of the Big Hole and was commended for his heroism.

During the Spanish–American War, Comba commanded the 12th Infantry Regiment in Cuba, including participation in the Battle of El Caney. As a temporary brigadier general, he commanded 2nd Brigade, 1st Division, Fourth Army Corps, and his aide-de-camp was Charles Carr Clark. After returning to his permanent rank of colonel, he commanded the 5th Infantry Regiment in the Philippines during the Philippine–American War, and was subsequently assigned to command the province of Abra on the island of Luzon. He left the army after reaching the mandatory retirement age of 64 in July 1901. In 1904, the US Congress enacted legislation permitting Union Army veterans who had served for 40 years and not attained permanent general officer's rank to be advanced one grade; under these criteria, Comba was promoted to brigadier general on the retired list.

In retirement, Comba resided in San Francisco and he was a member of the Military Order of the Loyal Legion of the United States and the Society of the Army of Santiago de Cuba. He died at the Presidio of San Francisco on 29 March 1907. Comba was buried at San Francisco National Cemetery.

== Dates of rank ==
Comba's dates of rank were:

- Private to First Sergeant, 30 January 1855 to 18 February 1863
- Second Lieutenant, 19 February 1863
- First Lieutenant (Brevet), 2 July 1863
- First Lieutenant, 30 October 1863
- Captain (Brevet), 13 March 1865
- Major (Brevet), 13 March 1865
- Captain, 14 March 1865
- Major, 15 May 1889
- Lieutenant Colonel (Brevet), 27 February 1890
- Lieutenant Colonel, 9 March 1893
- Colonel, 30 June 1898
- Brigadier General (United States Volunteers), 7 September 1898
- Colonel, 15 April 1899
- Colonel (Retired), 11 July 1901
- Brigadier General (Retired), 23 April 1904
