= Theodore Anderson Baldwin =

United States Army general

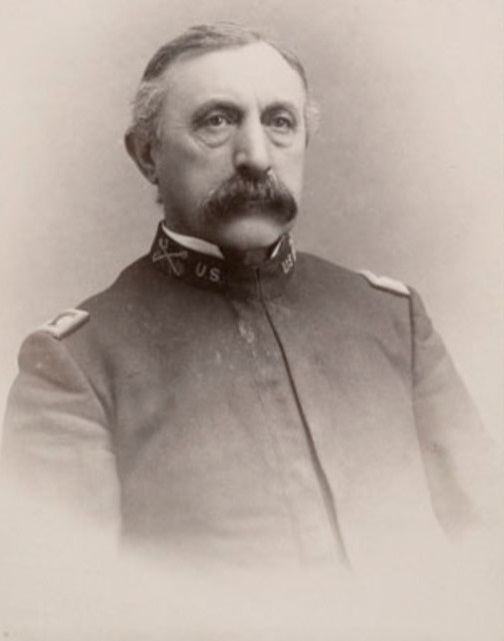
- Baldwin as a lieutenant colonel with the 10th Cavalry, circa 1896
- Born: December 21, 1839; Newton, New Jersey, US
- Died: September 1, 1925 (aged 85); Chattanooga, Tennessee, US
- Burial place: Arlington National Cemetery
- Military career
- Allegiance: United States
- Branch: United States Army
- Service years: 1862–1903
- Rank: Brigadier General
- Commands: 7th Cavalry Regiment
- Conflicts: American Civil War; Spanish–American War

Theodore Anderson Baldwin (December 21, 1839 – September 1, 1925) was a U.S. military officer during the American Civil War and the Spanish–American War.

== Early life ==
Baldwin was born on December 21, 1839, in Newton, New Jersey, a son of Matthias F. Baldwin and Hannah Baldwin. He was working as a bookkeeper in Logansport, Indiana when he enlisted in the Union Army during the American Civil War.

== Career ==
Baldwin entered the Army in 1862 as a private assigned to the 19th Infantry Regiment. He advanced to quartermaster sergeant, and served until May 1865. On May 19, 1865, he was commissioned as a second lieutenant in the 19th Infantry, with an effective date of February 9 and promoted to first lieutenant, also effective as of February 9.

He remained in the army after the war, and was promoted to captain in 1867. Beginning in 1870 he served primarily with the 10th United States Cavalry and 7th United States Cavalry. He was promoted to major in 1887 and lieutenant colonel in 1896.

In October 1898, he was promoted to temporary brigadier general of volunteers in the Spanish–American War. In 1899 he was promoted to colonel in the regular army. In April 1903 he was promoted to brigadier general in the regular army. He retired in December 1903.

== Death and legacy ==
Baldwin died in Chattanooga, Tennessee on September 1, 1925. He was buried at Arlington National Cemetery.

== Family ==
His daughter, Emma Baldwin, married Samuel D. Rockenbach, who also served in the 10th United States Cavalry. His son Theodore Anderson Baldwin Jr. (1878-1957) attained the rank of colonel as a career officer in the United States Army. A veteran of the Spanish–American War and World War I, he was a pilot and early member of the Army's Air Service.

== See also ==
- 10th Cavalry Regiment (United States)
