= William Henry Bisbee =

United States Army General (1840–1942)

- Brigadier General William Henry Bisbee (1840-1942)
- Born: January 28, 1840; Woonsocket, Rhode Island, US
- Died: June 11, 1942 (aged 102); Brookline, Massachusetts, US
- Burial place: Arlington National Cemetery, Arlington, Virginia, US
- Military career
- Allegiance: United States
- Branch: United States Army
- Service years: 1861–1902
- Rank: Brigadier General
- Service number: 0-13019
- Conflicts: American Civil War; Mill Springs (Kentucky Campaign); Siege of Corinth; Perryville; Stones River; Chickamauga; Tullahoma campaign; Chattanooga; New Hope Church; Kennesaw Mountain; Peachtree Creek; Utoy Creek; Siege of Atlanta; Jonesboro; Lookout Mountain; Indian Wars; Engagements with Sioux Indians (Fort Phil Kearny); Bannock Indian Disturbances (Jackson’s Hole); Great Railroad Strike of 1877; Pullman Strike; Coxey's Army; Spanish-American War; Santiago Campaign; El Caney; San Juan Hill; Philippine-American War; Battle of San Fabian
- Awards: Purple Heart

William Henry Bisbee (January 28, 1840 – June 11, 1942) was a United States Army General whose military career spanned over four decades, encompassing conflicts from the American Civil War through the Philippine–American War. A career officer, Bisbee's service was marked by his bravery in battle, strategic acumen, and commitment to his country, culminating in his promotion to Brigadier General and recognition as one of the oldest retired officers of the U.S. Army.

== Early life and education ==
William Henry Bisbee was born in Woonsocket, Rhode Island, on January 28, 1840, to William Orson Bisbee and Harriet Miriam (Ballou) Bisbee. He was a descendant of a Norman chieftain who fought under William the Conqueror at the Battle of Hastings in 1066. After receiving his early education in Woonsocket, Bisbee worked in merchandising before joining the U.S. Army.

== Civil War service ==
Bisbee enlisted in the United States Army on September 2, 1861, as part of the 18th United States Infantry. He served with the Army of the Ohio and later the Army of the Cumberland, participating in major battles such as Corinth, Perryville, Stones River, Chickamauga, Chattanooga, Atlanta, Jonesboro, and Lookout Mountain. His valor at Stones River led to multiple citations and a promotion to Second Lieutenant by President Abraham Lincoln. He was wounded three times in battle.

== Indian Wars and Spanish-American War ==
Following the Civil War, Bisbee was involved in several frontier engagements during the Indian Wars, including roles in Indian Territory (Oklahoma). During the Spanish–American War, he commanded a regiment in Cuba, contributing to the Siege of Santiago, El Caney, and San Juan, Puerto Rico. His performance in these conflicts earned him a promotion to Colonel.

== Philippine-American War and later career ==
Bisbee was transferred to the Philippines after the Spanish–American War, serving as a military governor in Pangasinan and Nueva Ecija Provinces during the Philippine–American War. His effective leadership resulted in his promotion to Brigadier General in October 1901. He retired in 1902 after a distinguished 41-year career.

== Personal life ==
On September 3, 1863, Bisbee married Lucy Katherine Shade, and they had four children: Eugene Shade, Katherine Ballou, Haymond Bird, and Louise Lucille. Lucy passed away in her seventy-fifth year.

== Retirement and legacy ==
General Bisbee retired as one of the longest-serving officers from the Civil War era. Upon his death on June 11, 1942, he was the oldest retired officer of the United States Army, having lived to the age of 102.

He was recognized by numerous military organizations and was a member of several prestigious societies including the Sons of the American Revolution. He was also a companion of the District of Columbia Commandery of the Military Order of the Loyal Legion of the United States.

He is buried at Arlington National Cemetery.
