= Chambers McKibbin =

U.S. Army brigadier general

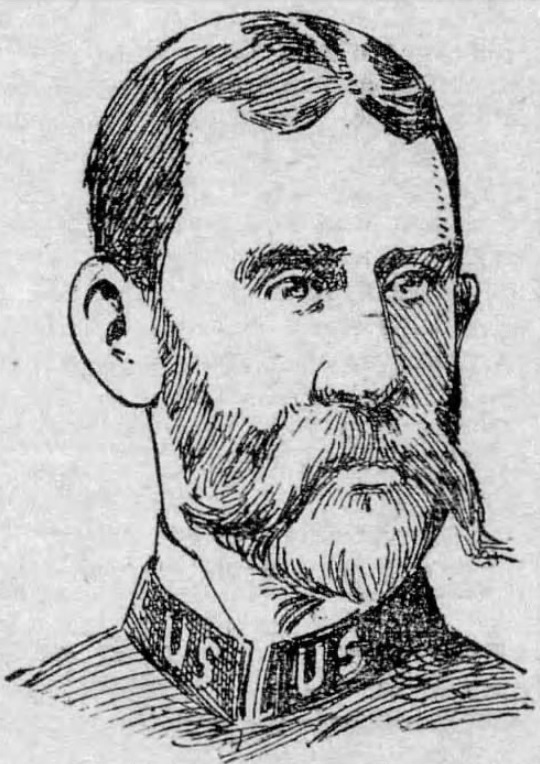
- The Cincinnati Post, July 20, 1898
- Born: November 2, 1841; Chambersburg, Pennsylvania, U.S.
- Died: December 30, 1918 (aged 77); Washington, District of Columbia, U.S.
- Burial place: Arlington National Cemetery
- Spouse: Mary Gaines Sibley (m. 1869)
- Children: 2
- Relatives: Joseph C. McKibbin (brother); David B. McKibbin (brother); Frederick W. Sibley (brother in law)
- Military career
- Allegiance: Union; United States
- Branch: Union Army (American Civil War); United States Army
- Service years: 1862 –1865 (Union Army); 1865 –1902 (U.S. Army)
- Rank: Brigadier General
- Unit: U.S. Army Infantry Branch
- Commands: 12th Infantry Regiment; 24th Infantry Regiment; Military Governor of Santiago de Cuba
- Wars: American Civil War; American Indian Wars; Spanish–American War

Chambers McKibbin (November 2, 1841 – December 30, 1918) was a United States Army Brigadier General, whose last tour of duty was as the 1899–1901 commanding officer at Fort Sam Houston in San Antonio, Texas.

== Family background ==
McKibbin was born at Chambersburg, Pennsylvania, November 2, 1841. His three brothers Joseph C. McKibbin, David B. McKibbin and Robert Peebles McKibbin enlisted in the Union Army during the American Civil War. In 1862, Robert was commissioned as a Lt. Colonel, and David eventually rose to the rank of brigadier general. Joseph would later become a United States Congressman from California.

== American Civil War ==
When the war broke out, Chambers was still a teenager, and not eligible to join the Union Army. Wanting to contribute to the war effort, he became a sutler, a civilian merchant selling directly to the army. Three months after his participation as a civilian in the Battle of Gaines' Mill, McKibbin enlisted on September 22, 1862, in the 14th Infantry Regiment, commissioned as a second lieutenant. He fought attached to the Union Army of the Potomac. He was promoted to first lieutenant, June 10, 1864. McGibbon was wounded at both the Battle of Chancellorsville and during his unit's engagement at the Weldon Railroad. He received a citation for bravery for his actions at the May 1864 Battle of North Anna.

== Later years ==
In July 1866, he was commissioned captain in the 35th Infantry. April 1892, he was promoted to major, 25th Infantry, and promoted to lieutenant colonel of the 21st Infantry in May 1896, participating in the American Indian Wars.

On July 10, 1898, during the Spanish–American War, he was commissioned brigadier general of the U. S. Volunteers, and honorably discharged from the commission at the end of the conflict. After the Spanish surrender, he was appointed military governor of Santiago.

In 1899, he was commissioned as a colonel with the 12th Infantry Regiment, later transferred to the 24th Infantry Regiment. 1899–1901 he was commanding officer at Fort Sam Houston in San Antonio, Texas. He was transferred to the 24th Infantry, August 12, 1901, and was promoted to brigadier general, October 1902.

== Death ==
McKibbin died December 30, 1918. In retirement, he and his wife Mary had lived at the prestigious Wyoming Apartments, Northwest, Washington, D.C., in the Kalorama neighborhood. The building is currently on the NRHP NW Quadrant of Washington, D.C., and has also been home to numerous influential persons, including Mamie Eisenhower and Dwight D. Eisenhower. He was buried at Arlington National Cemetery, where his brothers David and Joseph were also buried.

== See also ==
- Pershing House
