= José Toral y Velázquez =

Spanish general (1832-1904)

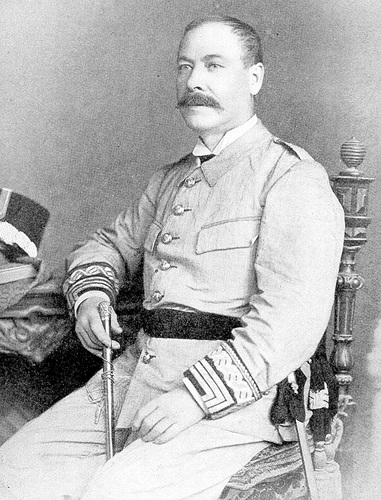
- circa 1898
- Born: August 18, 1832; Mazarrón, Murcia, Spain
- Died: July 10, 1904 (aged 71); Carabanchel, Community of Madrid, Spain
- Military career
- Allegiance: Spain
- Branch: Spanish Army
- Service years: 1842-1899
- Rank: General de brigada
- Commands: Madrid garrison Division, IV Corps; IV Corps (temporary)
- Conflicts: Spanish-American War: Santiago campaign; Battle of San Juan Hill

José Toral y Velázquez (Note: Many (but not all) English-language sources list Toral's name as "José Toral y Vázquez". But as original Spanish-language documents make clear, his correct name is "José Toral y Velázquez".) (August 18, 1832 – July 10, 1904) was a Spanish Army general who was a divisional commander of IV Corps in Cuba during the Spanish–American War. He surrendered the city of Santiago de Cuba on July 17, 1898, after the Siege of Santiago.

== Early life and career ==
Toral was born August 18, 1832, in the southeastern Spanish city of Mazarrón. The region was in the midst of a mining boom, but Toral's family had a long history of military service. He entered the Academia General Militar at the age of 10, and served in the administrative branch of the Spanish Army. He saw active duty from the 1840s to the 1870s, serving domestically as well as in colonial posts during insurrections. Toral was opposed to the First Spanish Republic, which he referred to as an "obscenidad" and he supported the coup d'état led by Arsenio Martínez Campos to overthrow the Republic and restore the monarchy. As a reward for these efforts he was promoted to brigadier general in 1889. In 1895, he was appointed the commander of the garrison of Madrid, which provided security for government buildings and officials as well as ceremonial troops for various functions. Ideologically, Toral was a "staunch monarchist" and a devout antisemite.

In late 1895, Toral volunteered for duty in Cuba. He was assigned to the Spanish Army garrison in Guantánamo, where he performed his duties during the Cuban War of Independence. When the Spanish–American War broke out in April 1898, Lieutenant General Arsenio Linares y Pombo requested that Toral become his deputy at the garrison at Santiago de Cuba. Linares established a military commission to establish defenses for the city, and appointed Toral to this body. Afterward, Toral was assigned command one of two divisions that made up IV Corps—the unit commanded by Linares which defended Santiago de Cuba. In late May, a neighborhood in the eastern part of the city of Santiago de Cuba saw an attempted uprising. The uprising was put down. However, when Toral ordered his men to execute the rebel leaders they reported they were unable to identify who those leaders were, as they had hid amongst the civilian population. Toral ordered 50 random men to be chosen from the community and executed via firing squad, which they were on May 29.

=== Battle and surrender at Santiago de Cuba ===
On July 1, 1898, Linares was wounded in the Battle of San Juan Hill. Toral was named temporary commander of IV Corps. Toral inherited a poorly executed defense: Of the more than 6,000 troops at his command, Linares had dispatched 500 to hold the heights at El Caney and more than 1,000 to hold the harbor entrance. But just 1,200 of the remaining 4,000 soldiers had been sent to hold San Juan Heights — the defensive key to the city. After the defeat at San Juan, most of the defenders pulled back within the city limits. The United States Navy had cut the telegraph cables to Guantánamo on June 7, so Toral sent a messenger to Brigadier General Félix Pareja Mesa asking for reinforcements. Mesa never received the message.

Early in the morning on July 3, U.S. Major General William Rufus Shafter asked Toral to surrender. Toral refused. Hours later, Admiral Pascual Cervera y Topete's Atlantic Squadron attempted to leave Santiago de Cuba's harbor and was destroyed by the U.S. Navy's Flying Squadron and North Atlantic Squadron, commanded by Commodore Winfield Scott Schley. Shafter contacted Toral again late on July 3, and asked for his surrender a second time. Shafter warned him that the city would be bombarded on July 5 without it. Toral continued to negotiate, trying to buy time. On July 8, Toral offered to surrender — but only if he would be permitted to withdraw his men and arms to the town of Holguín. Shafter, his V Corps decimated by disease and suffering from the extreme heat, poor supplies, poor sanitation, and poor housing, wanted to permit the withdrawal. But President William McKinley, consulted on the situation, demanded unconditional surrender.

Shafter warned Toral that bombardment of Santiago de Cuba would happen on July 10 unless he surrendered, and Toral again declined the request. U.S. Navy and U.S. Army troops shelled the city beginning at 4:00 p.m. on July 10 and ceased at 1:00 p.m. on July 11. Toral held his ground and continued to negotiate. Shafter offered to send all Spanish prisoners of war to Spain at American expense and allow Toral to evacuate his men and arms if the Spanish commander surrendered. Meanwhile, General Ramón Blanco y Erenas, commander of all Spanish forces in Cuba, pressured Toral to surrender to spare the city further shelling. The Spanish government in Madrid was also pressing Toral to surrender. Toral declined to do so. But the Americans cut the water supply to the city and conditions for the civilian population deteriorated rapidly.

General Toral unconditionally surrendered his remaining men at Santiago de Cuba, the 12,000 men at Guantánamo, and six other small Spanish Army garrisons throughout Cuba on July 17, 1898. The surrender effectively ended land combat in Cuba for the duration of the war. Concerned with his post-war reputation, Toral successfully demanded that the word "capitulation" rather than "surrender" be used in all documents and that his men be allowed to retain their weapons.

== Post-war life ==
On July 22, the government of Spain requested peace terms from the United States. Spain and the United States signed an armistice, the "Protocol of Peace", on August 12.

Toral departed for Spain on August 15, 1898, under the terms of the Protocol of Peace. The Spanish people, however, blamed him for the collapse of the Spanish military effort in Cuba and his arrival was met with public demonstrations. Some of these were violent. In the city of Vigo, the crowd threw stones at him. Toral was tried before a court-martial for surrendering Santiago de Cuba. He was defended by Julián Suárez Inclán, and acquitted on August 9, 1899.

Public attacks on his character and behavior continued frequently throughout the rest of Toral's life. He became depressed and slowly went insane. A few months before his death, he was placed in a psychiatric hospital in Carabanchel, a suburb of Madrid. He died there on July 10, 1904.
