= Henry Carroll (general) =

American brigadier general (1836–1908)

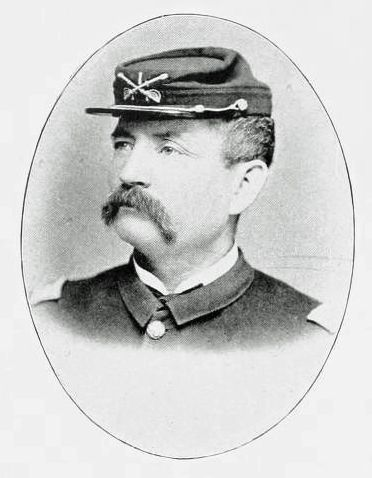
- Born: May 20, 1836; Copenhagen, New York, U.S.
- Died: February 16, 1908 (aged 71); Colorado Springs, Colorado, U.S.
- Military career
- Branch: United States Army
- Service years: 1859–1899
- Rank: Brigadier General
- Units: 3rd Artillery Regiment; IX Corps
- Commands: 6th Cavalry Regiment
- Conflicts: American Civil War; Manassas campaign; Battle of Blackburn's Ford; First Battle of Bull Run; Operations against Charleston; Battle of Port Royal; Battle of Secessionville; First Battle of Fort Wagner; Second Battle of Charleston Harbor; Second Battle of Fort Sumter; Overland Campaign; Battle of the Wilderness; Apache Wars; Victorio's War; Ghost Dance War; Spanish–American War; Battle of San Juan Hill

Henry Carroll was an American brigadier general of the American Civil War and the Spanish–American War. He was known for commanding the 1st Brigade of the Cavalry Division during the Battle of San Juan Hill but was wounded during the battle and had to be succeeded by Brigadier General Samuel S. Sumner.

== Early military career ==
Carroll was born at Copenhagen, New York, on May 20, 1836, but moved to Minnesota in 1858. He enlisted as a private at Light Battery E of the 3rd Artillery Regiment on January 13, 1859, at Fort Ridgely. He was promoted to corporal, sergeant, first sergeant as of July 1, 1861. He took part in a campaign against the Sioux in the summer of 1859 within Dakota.

== American Civil War ==
Upon the outbreak of the American Civil War, he was part of the forces that occupied Alexandria, Virginia and subsequently participated in the battles of Blackburn's Ford and 1st Bull Run. He then participated in the Battle of Port Royal and was at Fernandina Beach and Jacksonville, Florida in March 1862. He later returned to South Carolina at Johns Island and James Island and took part in the Battle of Secessionville. Carroll later took part in the capture of Morris Island as well as taking part of the First Battle of Fort Wagner and the Second Battle of Fort Sumter, being presented a medal for his services in Forts Wagner, Gregg and Sumter on August 23, 1863, but was wounded the same day.

Despite being discharged on January 13, 1864, Carroll re-enlisted in Light Battery G of the 3rd Artillery Regiment at Washington, D.C., on February 3, 1864. He was later assigned to the IX Corps and participated in the Battle of the Wilderness until being transferred to the 3rd Cavalry Regiment as a second lieutenant on May 18. He was stationed at Little Rock, Arkansas, and made active patrols in the area to counter any potential Confederate cavalry movements. He was then made quartermaster of the 2nd Cavalry Brigade and later the depot quartermaster at Duval's Bluff, Arkansas [sic], from June to November 1865.

== Service in the frontier ==
After being promoted to first lieutenant on April 14, 1866, he began travelling to Fort Union via the Indian Territory from May to August 1866. He later served at Fort Stevens and Los Pinos and on January 22, 1867, he was promoted to captain of the 9th Cavalry Regiment at Fort Stockton, Texas. Carroll spent a majority of his service at Texas with two exceptions with his recruiting service at St. Louis and Chicago from January 1873 to October 1874. While in Texas, Carroll's service consisted of scouting for Native Americans, stock-thieves or murderers. He also served in negotiations with the Comanche and the Kiowa tribes in September 1869 and enforced reconstruction policies at Marion County, Texas from January to February 1870. He was later sent to Austin in November 1869 to participate in an affair at the Brazos River.

He was later placed back in New Mexico in 1876 and participated in a conflict with the Apache within the Florida Mountains on September 13, 1876, the Mescalero within the Sacramento Mountains on July 22, 1878, the Apaches again within the San Andreas Mountains on February 3, 1880, and participated in Victorio's War until Carroll was wounded on April 6, 1880. While he was recovering, Carroll was suggested for a brevet promotion to lieutenant colonel but after becoming sick, Carroll was recovering until March 1881 when he began scouting for the Ute Mountain Ute Tribe in Colorado and Utah for the rest of the year as he was primarily stationed in Fort Lewis. He then partook in a conflict against the Chiricahua at the Dragoon Mountains on October 4, 1881. Afterwards, he was transferred to the Indian Territory and later to Nebraska in 1885 and was promoted to major of the 1st Cavalry Regiment on June 3. He also took part in the Ghost Dance War from November 24, 1890, to February 5, 1891.

== Spanish–American War and retirement ==
On May 23, 1896, Carroll was promoted to lieutenant colonel of the 6th Cavalry Regiment and by the time the Spanish–American War broke out, he was given command of the 1st Brigade of the V Corps. During the Battle of San Juan Hill, Caroll commanded both the 1st Brigade and the 6th Cavalry Regiment but was wounded during the battle after leading a charge and had to be succeeded by Brigadier General Samuel S. Sumner and Major Thomas C. Lebo respectively. Following the war, he was promoted to colonel of the 7th Cavalry Regiment on March 29, 1899, but retired by May 6. Despite his retirement, he was promoted to brigadier general on April 23, 1904.
