= Ezra P. Ewers =

Ezra P. Ewers was an American soldier born in Wayneport, New York.

== Early life and education ==
Ewers was born in Wayneport, New York and educated in public schools. He was a practical machinist by trade.

== Military career ==
On January 18, 1862, he enlisted in the U.S. 19th Infantry and was promoted to first sergeant on March 7, 1863. In recognition of bravery and meritorious conduct during the Battle of Chickamauga, he was promoted to the rank of second lieutenant on October 31, 1863. Ewers earned promotion to first lieutenant on March 16, 1864, and transferred to the 37th Infantry on September 21, 1866. He was promoted to captain on September 12, 1867, and transferred to 5th Infantry on May 19, 1869. He became major in the 9th Infantry on March 7, 1893, and lieutenant colonel of the 9th Infantry on April 30, 1897.

== Personal life ==
Ewers married Sylvia Vaux, daughter of William Vaux, a priest; they had one son, William Vaux, who became a physician in Rochester, New York.
