= Hugh A. Theaker =

American colonel

Hugh Albert Theaker
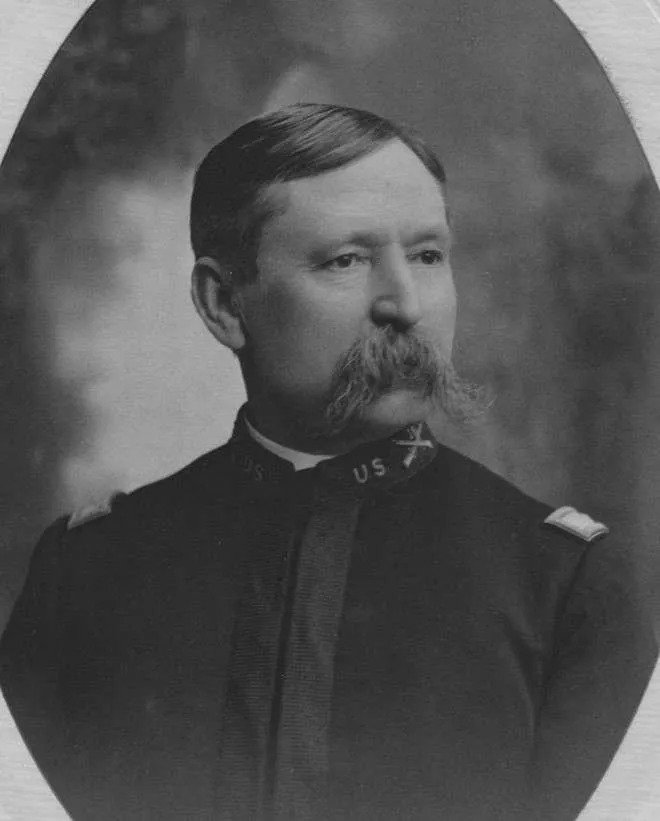
- Theaker during his service at Fort Sherman
- Born: February 4, 1842; Geauga County, Ohio, U.S.
- Died: August 28, 1903 (aged 61); Port Huron, Michigan, U.S.
- Spouse: Bellamina Ebert Kline Theaker
- Military career
- Branch: United States Army
- Service years: 1861–1898
- Rank: Colonel
- Commands: 16th Infantry Regiment
- Conflicts: American Civil War: Chattanooga–Ringgold campaign; Battle of Missionary Ridge; Spanish–American War: Santiago campaign; Battle of San Juan Hill; Siege of Santiago

Hugh Albert Theaker (1842–1903) was an American colonel who participated in the American Civil War and the Spanish–American War. He was known for commanding the 16th Infantry Regiment throughout both wars and participating in several major battles during the Spanish–American War.

== Military career ==
Hugh was born on February 4, 1842, at Geauga County, Ohio as the son of Thomas Clarke Theaker and Mary McConahey Theaker. On May 11, 1861, Theaker was enlisted for the 16th Infantry Regiment during the American Civil War as a 1st Lieutenant. After participating at the Battle of Missionary Ridge, he was brevetted to captain in November 1863. On 1866, he was transferred to the 34th Infantry Regiment but sent back to the 16th Infantry Regiment after it was merged with parts of the 11th Infantry Regiment in 1869. He spent some time with the 16th Infantry Regiment before finally being promoted to Major on September 6, 1886. At one point, Theaker was transferred to the 14th Infantry Regiment as a Lieutenant Colonel before being promoted to a full colonel of the 16th Infantry Regiment on March 10, 1896. Prior to this, Theaker was assigned to Fort Gibson from March 6, 1880, to March 28, 1880, and at Fort Sherman from October 1896 to April 21, 1898, as a post commander. During the Spanish–American War, he led the 16th Infantry Regiment through the Battle of San Juan Hill and Siege of Santiago before retiring on August 11, 1898.
