= Sumner (surname) =

Sumner is a surname. It originates from the English-language word that is spelt, in modern English, summoner, denoting a person who serves a summons. In Geoffrey Chaucer's The Canterbury Tales, one of the characters is a summoner (see "The Summoner's Tale"); a Middle English spelling is Somonour. Other spellings include Sumpner, Somner, and Summoner.

Notable people with this surname include:

- Allen Melancthon Sumner (1882–1918), American Marine
- Andrew Sumner, British movie journalist and publisher
- Benedict Humphrey Sumner (1893–1951), usually known as Humphrey Sumner, English historian
- Bernard Sumner (born 1956), British musician
- Brian Sumner (born 1979), British skateboarder
- Bruce Sumner (1924–2018), American Superior Court Judge
- Byron Sumner (born 1991), Australian rules footballer
- Carl Sumner (1908–1999), American baseball player
- Charles Sumner (1811–1874), American politician
- Charles Sumner (bishop) (1790–1874), Anglican bishop (Landaff and then Winchester)
- Charlie Sumner (1930–2015), American football player and coach
- Charlotte Sumner, American neurologist
- Chris Sumner (born 1943), former Australian politician
- Cid Ricketts Sumner (1890–1970), American novelist
- Claude Sumner (1919–2012), Canadian philosopher
- Edmond Sumner (born 1995), American basketball player, NBA, Indiana Pacers
- Edwin Vose Sumner (1797–1863), American Civil War general
- Elizabeth Keawepoʻoʻole Sumner (1850–1911), Hawaiian chiefess and lady-in-waiting
- Francis Bertody Sumner (1874–1945), American ichthyologist, zoologist and writer
- Geoffrey Sumner (1908–1989), British actor, commentator for British Movietone News
- Gordon Sumner, former Australian rules footballer
- Sting (born Gordon Matthew Thomas Sumner in 1951), lead singer of British Band The Police
- Gregory Sumner, history professor and biographer
- Heywood Sumner (1853–1940), English artist, designer, writer and archaeologist
- Humphrey Sumner (1743–1814), English Anglican priest and educationalist
- Increase Sumner (1746–1799), American politician and jurist
- J. D. Sumner (1924–1998), American singer and songwriter
- James B. Sumner (1887–1955), American biochemist
- Jean Sumner, American internist and academic administrator
- Jessie Sumner (1898–1994), U.S. Representative from Illinois
- Jethro Sumner (1733–1785), American Revolutionary War general
- Joe Sumner (born 1976), British musician
- John Sumner (actor, died 1649) (died May 1649), English theatre actor
- John Bird Sumner (1780–1862), Anglican bishop/Archbishop of Canterbury
- John Robert Sumner (1850–1933), English amateur footballer, played in 1873 FA Cup Final (grandson of John Bird Sumner)
- John S. Sumner (1876–1971), head of New York Society for the Suppression of Vice from 1915 to 1950
- Joseph Burton Sumner (1837–1920), American settler
- Kelly Sumner (born 1961), British businessman
- L. W. Sumner (born 1941), Canadian philosopher
- Liam Sumner (born 1993), former professional Australian rules footballer
- Major "Moogy" Sumner (born 1948), Aboriginal Australian elder, environmental activist, dancer, and cultural adviser
- Mary Sumner (1828–1921), founder of the Mothers' Union
- Mary Lou Sumner (1927–2002), American politician
- Mickey Sumner (born 1984), English actress
- Nancy Sumner (1839–1895), Hawaiian chiefess and lady-in-waiting
- Ninito Sumner (c. 1821 – 1898), Tahitian princess
- Peter Sumner (1942–2016), Australian actor, director and writer
- Phil Sumner (born 1990), cornet, keyboard and guitar player
- Robert Sumner (1922–2016), American evangelist and writer
- Samuel S. Sumner (1842–1937), American general
- Sarah Sumner, American evangelical theologian
- Sophie Sumner (born 1990), British fashion model
- Steve Sumner (1955–2017), New Zealand football player
- T. B. Sumner (1857–1934), American politician
- Thomas Hubbard Sumner (1807–1876), American mariner
- Tim Sumner (footballer) (born 1994), Australian rules footballer
- Tim Sumner (physicist), Professor of Experimental Physics at Imperial College London
- Walt Sumner (born 1947), American football player
- William Graham Sumner (1840–1910), American sociologist
- William H. Sumner (1780–1861), Boston historical figure
- William Keolaloa Sumner (1816–1885), Hawaiian chief and landholder

== See also ==
- General Sumner (disambiguation)
- Senator Sumner (disambiguation)
- Summer (surname)
- Sumners, surname
