= Woodring =

Woodring is a surname. Notable people with the surname include:

- Allen Woodring (1898–1982), American sprint runner
- Harry Hines Woodring (1887–1967), American politician
- Jim Woodring (born 1952), American cartoonist, fine artist, writer and toy designer
- John Ross Woodring (1883–1946), a newspaperman, circus showman and farmer
- Kyle Woodring (1967–2009), studio and concert drummer living in the Chicago, Illinois area
- Mackenzie Woodring, American cyclist who won a gold medal at the 2008 Summer Paralympics in Beijing, China
- Peter Woodring (born 1968), retired U.S. soccer forward
- Peyton Woodring (born 2004), American football player
- Wendell P. Woodring (1891–1983), American paleontologist and geologist
- Matthew Woodring Stover (born 1962), American fantasy and science fiction novelist

== See also ==
- Enid Woodring Regional Airport, Enid, Garfield County, Oklahoma, United States
- Woodring Field, Vance Air Force Base, southern Enid, Oklahoma, United States
- Mount Woodring, located in the Teton Range, Grand Teton National Park, Wyoming
- Wooding
- Woodrising (disambiguation)
