= Thomas Sumner =

Thomas Sumner may refer to:

- Thomas Hubbard Sumner (1807–1876), sea captain known for developing a celestial navigation method
- Thomas Waldron Sumner (1768–1849), architect and government representative in Boston, Massachusetts
- T. B. Sumner (1857–1934), member of the Washington State Senate

== See also ==
- Sumner (surname)
