= General Sumner =

General Sumner may refer to:

- Edwin Vose Sumner (1797–1863), Union Army major general
- Edwin Vose Sumner Jr. (1835–1912), U.S. Army brevet brigadier general
- Jethro Sumner (c. 1733–1785), North Carolina Militia brigadier general in the American Revolutionary War
- Samuel S. Sumner (1842–1937), U.S. Army major general
- William H. Sumner (1780–1861), Massachusetts Militia general

== See also ==
- Owen Summers Jr. (1890–1971), U.S Army brigadier general
