= Senator Dyer =

Senator Dyer may refer to:

- Buddy Dyer (born 1958), Florida State Senate
- Elisha Dyer Jr. (1839–1906), Rhode Island State Senate
- Myles P. Dyer (1887–1969), Missouri State Senate
- Ross W. Dyer (1911–1993), Tennessee State Senate
- Trusten P. Dyer (1856–1926), Washington State Senate

== See also ==
- Senator Dwyer (disambiguation)
