= Senator Parkinson =

Senator Parkinson may refer to:

- Don Parkinson (politician) (1942–2020), Senate of Guam
- Mark Parkinson (born 1957), Kansas State Senate
- W. J. Parkinson (1844–1902), Washington State Senate
