= 1924 Washington gubernatorial election =

- November 4, 1924
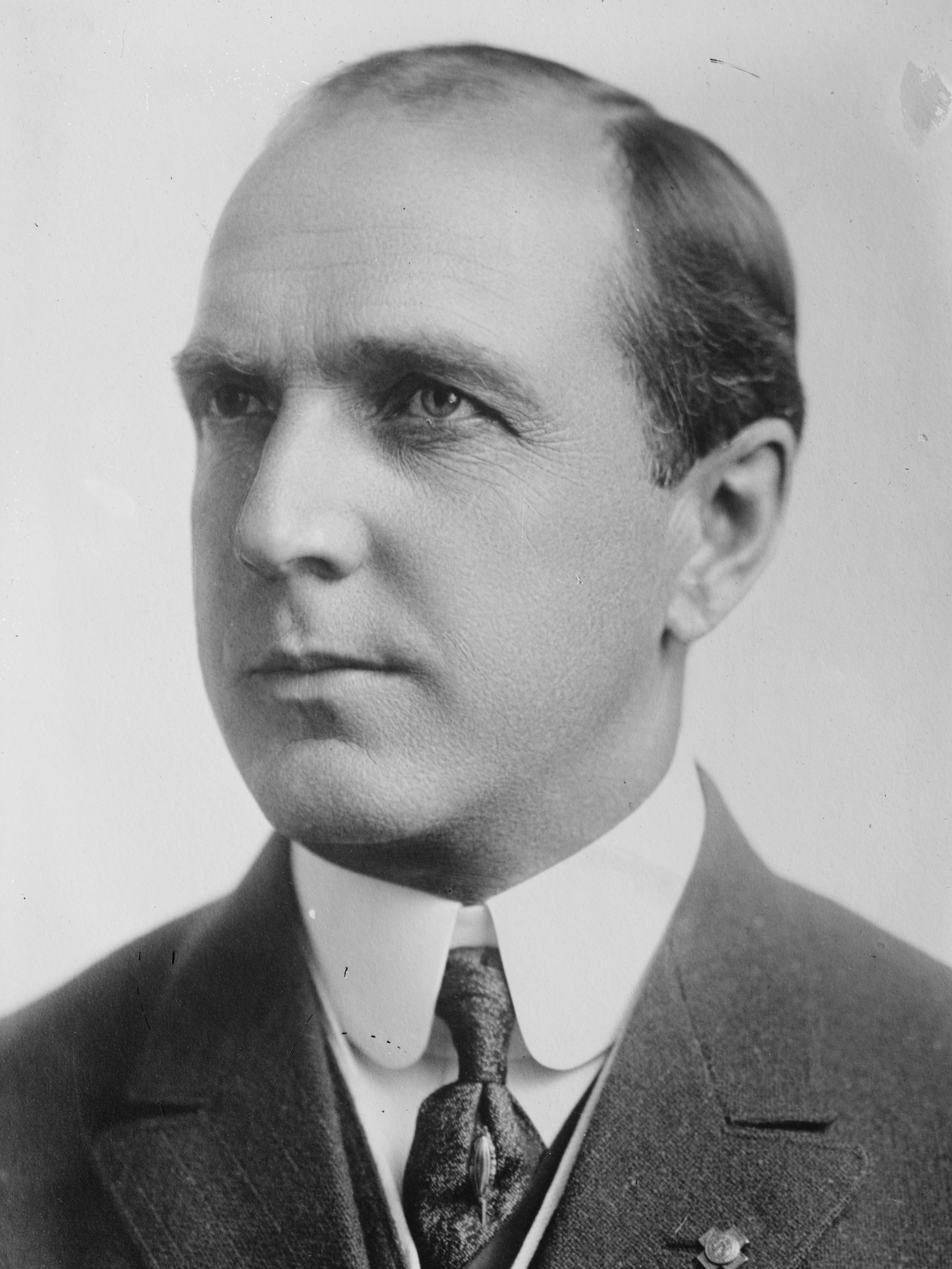

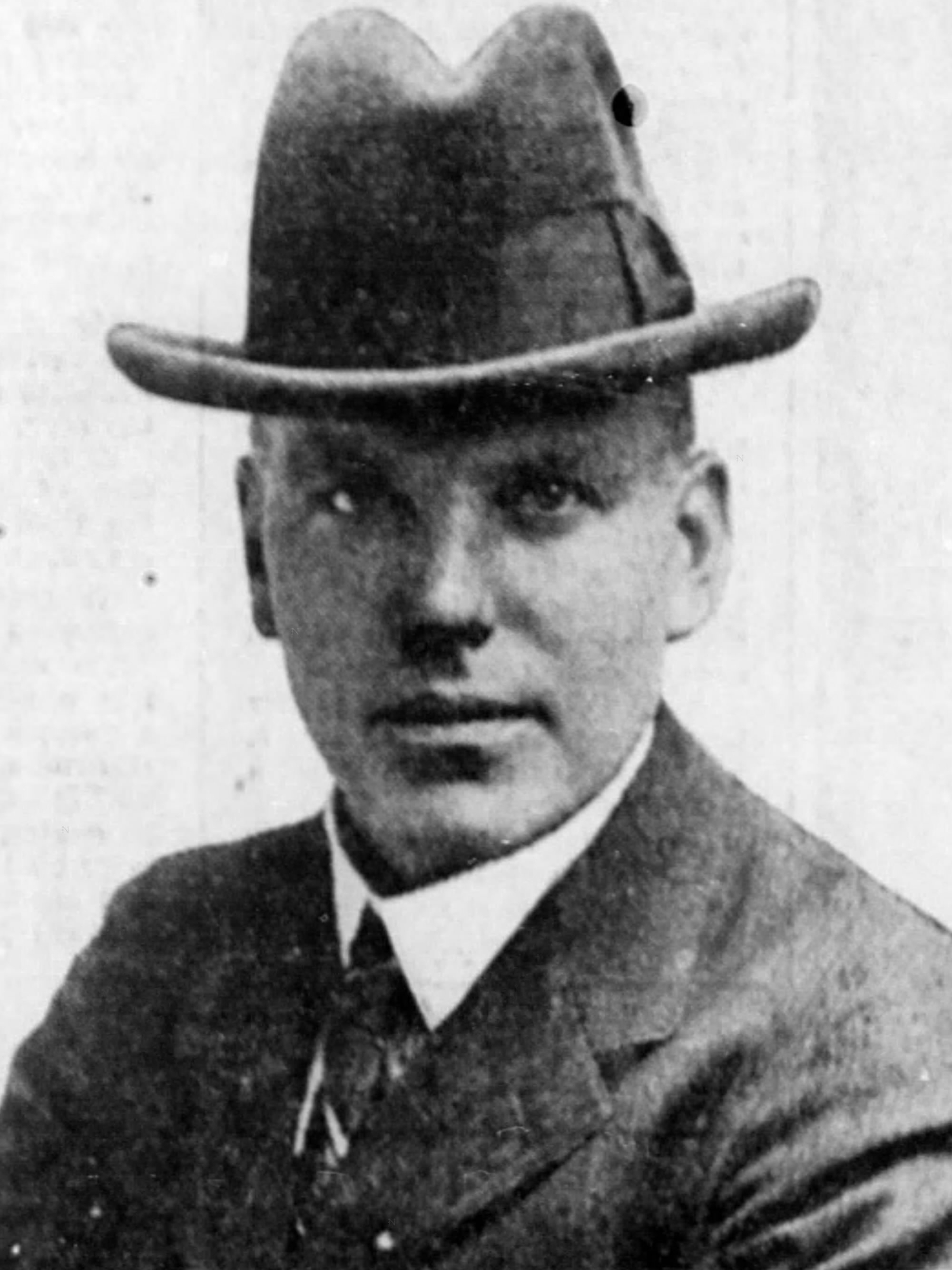
Nominee	Roland H. Hartley	Ben F. Hill	J. R. Oman
Party	Republican	Democratic	Farmer–Labor
Popular vote	220,162	126,447	40,073
Percentage	56.41%	32.40%	10.27%
- County results Hartley: 40–50% 50–60% 60–70% 70–80% Hill: 40–50% 50–60%
Governor before election
Louis F. Hart
Republican
Elected Governor
Roland H. Hartley
Republican

The 1924 Washington gubernatorial election was held on November 4, 1924. Republican nominee Roland H. Hartley defeated Democratic nominee Ben F. Hill with 56.41% of the vote. This was the last gubernatorial election until 2016 in which Grays Harbor County voted for a Republican candidate.

== Primary election ==
Primary elections were held on September 9, 1924.

=== Republican party ===
==== Candidates ====
- Edward Clifford
- William J. Coyle
- E. L. French
- James Townsend Fullerton
- Roland H. Hartley, former State Representative and former mayor of Everett
- Peter Iverson
- George B. Lamping, State Senator
- W. H. Paulhamus, former State Senator
- Frank Pierce
- Thomas P. Revelle

==== Results ====
Republican primary results
Party	Candidate	Votes	%
Republican	Roland H. Hartley	58,705	25.11%
Republican	E. L. French	56,936	24.36%
Republican	Edward Clifford	33,140	14.18%
Republican	W. H. Paulhamus	26,508	11.34%
Republican	George B. Lamping	21,535	9.21%
Republican	William J. Coyle	20,983	8.98%
Republican	Thomas P. Revelle	8,809	3.77%
Republican	Peter Iverson	3,055	1.31%
Republican	Frank Pierce	2,213	0.95%
Republican	James Townsend Fullerton	1,879	0.80%
Total votes		233,763	100.00%

=== Democratic party ===
==== Candidates ====
- E. F. Blaine
- Ben F. Hill, Mayor of Walla Walla
- Edward T. Mathes
- Walter J. Robinson

==== Results ====
Democratic primary results
Party	Candidate	Votes	%
Democratic	Ben F. Hill	7,753	34.59%
Democratic	Walter J. Robinson	6,568	29.30%
Democratic	Edward T. Mathes	4,951	22.09%
Democratic	E. F. Blaine	3,143	14.02%
Total votes		22,415	100.00%

=== Farmer-Labor party ===
==== Candidates ====
- J. R. Oman

==== Results ====
Farmer-Labor primary results
Party	Candidate	Votes	%
Farmer–Labor	J. R. Oman	7,186	100.00%
Total votes		7,186	100.00%

== General election ==
=== Candidates ===
Major party candidates

- Roland H. Hartley, Republican
- Ben F. Hill, Democratic

Other candidates

- J. R. Oman, Farmer–Labor
- William A. Gilmore, State (Note: This party was associated with Robert M. La Follette's Progressive Party)
- Emil Herman, Socialist
- David Burgess, Socialist Labor

=== Results ===
1924 Washington gubernatorial election
Party	Candidate	Votes	%	±%
Republican	Roland H. Hartley	220,162	56.41%	+3.66%
Democratic	Ben F. Hill	126,447	32.40%	+15.85%
Farmer–Labor	J. R. Oman	40,073	10.27%	−20.12%
State	William A. Gilmore	1,954	0.50%	
Socialist	Emil Herman	898	0.23%	
Socialist Labor	David Burgess	770	0.20%	−0.13%
Majority		93,715	24.01%	
Total votes		390,304	100.00%	
Republican hold		Swing	+1.65%	

=== Results by county ===
County	Roland H. Hartley Republican		Ben F. Hill Democratic		J. R. Oman Farmer-Labor		William A. Gilmore State		Emil Herman Socialist		David Burgess Socialist Labor		Margin		Total votes cast
County	#	%	#	%	#	%	#	%	#	%	#	%	#	%	Total votes cast
Adams	844	43.87%	953	49.53%	119	6.19%	6	0.31%	1	0.05%	1	0.05%	-109	-5.67%	1,924
Asotin	1,111	52.11%	858	40.24%	154	7.22%	2	0.09%	2	0.09%	5	0.23%	253	11.87%	2,132
Benton	1,920	49.77%	1,189	30.82%	737	19.10%	11	0.29%	1	0.03%	0	0.00%	731	18.95%	3,858
Chelan	4,403	55.44%	3,359	42.29%	159	2.00%	7	0.09%	6	0.08%	8	0.10%	1,044	13.15%	7,942
Clallam	2,588	65.90%	846	21.54%	460	11.71%	7	0.18%	16	0.41%	10	0.25%	1,742	44.36%	3,927
Clark	6,539	63.62%	2,418	23.53%	1,025	9.97%	217	2.11%	50	0.49%	29	0.28%	4,121	40.10%	10,278
Columbia	1,107	51.70%	914	42.69%	110	5.14%	2	0.09%	2	0.09%	6	0.28%	193	9.01%	2,141
Cowlitz	3,189	56.97%	2,060	36.80%	290	5.18%	20	0.36%	23	0.41%	16	0.29%	1,129	20.17%	5,598
Douglas	1,043	42.61%	1,291	52.74%	91	3.72%	10	0.41%	7	0.29%	6	0.25%	-248	-10.13%	2,448
Ferry	529	37.33%	782	55.19%	87	6.14%	10	0.71%	6	0.42%	3	0.21%	-253	-17.85%	1,417
Franklin	753	34.81%	884	40.87%	521	24.09%	1	0.05%	1	0.05%	3	0.14%	-131	-6.06%	2,163
Garfield	866	65.41%	447	33.76%	11	0.83%	0	0.00%	0	0.00%	0	0.00%	419	31.65%	1,324
Grant	870	46.28%	821	43.67%	151	8.03%	29	1.54%	8	0.43%	1	0.05%	49	2.61%	1,880
Grays Harbor	7,778	59.90%	3,619	27.87%	1,463	11.27%	58	0.45%	29	0.22%	37	0.28%	4,159	32.03%	12,984
Island	880	52.26%	489	29.04%	291	17.28%	6	0.36%	13	0.77%	5	0.30%	391	23.22%	1,684
Jefferson	994	60.83%	418	25.58%	207	12.67%	11	0.67%	2	0.12%	2	0.12%	576	35.25%	1,634
King	59,165	60.74%	27,936	28.68%	9,187	9.43%	681	0.70%	178	0.18%	254	0.26%	31,229	32.06%	97,401
Kitsap	3,708	46.19%	2,852	35.53%	1,345	16.75%	73	0.91%	26	0.32%	24	0.30%	856	10.66%	8,028
Kittitas	2,572	53.13%	1,585	32.74%	604	12.48%	17	0.35%	51	1.05%	12	0.25%	987	20.39%	4,841
Klickitat	1,696	65.46%	661	25.51%	182	7.02%	32	1.24%	15	0.58%	5	0.19%	1,035	39.95%	2,591
Lewis	6,053	51.65%	4,403	37.57%	1,165	9.94%	51	0.44%	21	0.18%	26	0.22%	1,650	14.08%	11,719
Lincoln	2,136	50.68%	1,938	45.98%	122	2.89%	14	0.33%	2	0.05%	3	0.07%	198	4.70%	4,215
Mason	971	55.61%	567	32.47%	174	9.97%	16	0.92%	11	0.63%	7	0.40%	404	23.14%	1,746
Okanogan	2,708	56.32%	1,795	37.33%	282	5.87%	9	0.19%	6	0.12%	8	0.17%	913	18.99%	4,808
Pacific	2,708	69.06%	1,023	26.09%	178	4.54%	3	0.08%	9	0.23%	0	0.00%	1,685	42.97%	3,921
Pend Oreille	1,049	55.56%	598	31.67%	237	12.55%	0	0.00%	3	0.16%	1	0.05%	451	23.89%	1,888
Pierce	20,962	50.19%	9,461	22.65%	11,048	26.45%	145	0.35%	60	0.14%	90	0.22%	9,914 (Note: Hartley's margin over Oman)	23.74%	41,766
San Juan	751	70.38%	287	26.90%	21	1.97%	3	0.28%	4	0.37%	1	0.09%	464	43.49%	1,067
Skagit	4,719	46.80%	3,587	35.57%	1,688	16.74%	66	0.65%	16	0.16%	7	0.07%	1,132	11.23%	10,083
Skamania	692	72.54%	204	21.38%	38	3.98%	9	0.94%	7	0.73%	4	0.42%	488	51.15%	954
Snohomish	9,417	46.31%	8,466	41.63%	2,190	10.77%	90	0.44%	139	0.68%	33	0.16%	951	4.68%	20,335
Spokane	24,187	53.26%	19,688	43.35%	1,463	3.22%	16	0.04%	16	0.04%	45	0.10%	4,499	9.91%	45,415
Stevens	2,998	53.35%	2,113	37.60%	436	7.76%	24	0.43%	26	0.46%	23	0.41%	885	15.75%	5,620
Thurston	5,043	57.22%	2,763	31.35%	926	10.51%	41	0.47%	21	0.24%	20	0.23%	2,280	25.87%	8,814
Wahkiakum	547	73.82%	124	16.73%	50	6.75%	9	1.21%	7	0.94%	4	0.54%	423	57.09%	741
Walla Walla	5,252	56.61%	3,598	38.78%	406	4.38%	17	0.18%	3	0.03%	2	0.02%	1,654	17.83%	9,278
Whatcom	8,773	61.42%	4,432	31.03%	770	5.39%	172	1.20%	87	0.61%	49	0.64%	4,341	30.39%	14,283
Whitman	5,517	59.95%	3,481	37.83%	185	2.01%	14	0.15%	3	0.03%	2	0.02%	2,036	22.13%	9,202
Yakima	13,124	71.90%	3,537	19.38%	1,500	8.22%	55	0.30%	20	0.11%	18	0.10%	9,587	52.52%	18,254
Totals	220,162	56.41%	126,447	32.40%	40,073	10.27%	1,954	0.50%	898	0.23%	770	0.20%	93,715	24.01%	390,304

==== Counties that flipped from Farmer-Labor to Republican ====
- Kitsap

==== Counties that flipped from Republican to Democratic ====
- Adams
- Douglas
- Ferry

==== Counties that flipped from Farmer-Labor to Democratic ====
- Franklin
