= Somner =

Somner is a surname. Notable people with the surname include:

- Adam Somner (died 2024), British-born American assistant director and film producer
- Doug Somner (born 1951), Scottish footballer
- Matt Somner (born 1982), English footballer
- William Somner (1593–1669), English scholar

== See also ==
- Sommer
- Sumner (surname)
