= Jesse S. Jones =

American politician

President pro tempore of the Washington Senate
- In office January 14, 1907 – January 11, 1909
- Preceded by: George H. Baker
- Succeeded by: A. S. Ruth

Member of the Washington State Senate for the 29th district
- In office 1907–1909; 1915–1919

Personal details
- Born: March 21, 1860 Aurora, Indiana, United States
- Died: November 7, 1931 (aged 71) Tacoma, Washington, United States
- Party: Republican

Jesse Shattuck Jones (March 21, 1860 – November 7, 1931) was an American politician in the state of Washington. He served in the Washington State Senate. From 1907 to 1909, he was President pro tempore of the Senate. In 1894, Jones moved to Tacoma, Washington and was involved in business. He served on the Tacoma City Council and served as president of the city council.
