= Edward L. French =

American politician

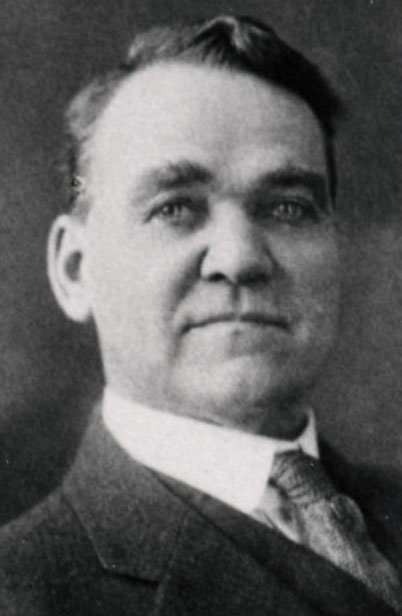
- French in 1917

President pro tempore of the Washington Senate
- In office January 11, 1915 – January 8, 1917
- Preceded by: Pliny L. Allen
- Succeeded by: Ralph D. Nichols

Member of the Washington State Senate for the 17th district
- In office 1913–1921

Member of the Washington House of Representatives for the 23rd district
- In office 1909–1913

Personal details
- Born: August 19, 1860 Indiana United States
- Died: July 29, 1947 (aged 86) Vancouver, Washington, United States
- Party: Republican

Edward L. French (August 19, 1860 – July 29, 1947) was an American politician in the state of Washington. He served in the Washington State Senate and Washington House of Representatives. From 1915 to 1917, he was President pro tempore of the Senate.
