= Senator Sumner (disambiguation) =

Charles Sumner (1811–1874) was a U.S. Senator from Massachusetts from 1851 to 1874. Senator Sumner may also refer to:

- Bill Sumner (born 1934), Alaska State Senate
- Charles A. Sumner (1835–1903), Nevada State Senate
- George G. Sumner (1841–1906), Connecticut State Senate
- Susan Sumner (born 1958), Washington State Senate
- T. B. Sumner (1857–1934), Washington State Senate
