= Senator Dwyer =

Senator Dwyer may refer to:

- Bernard J. Dwyer (1921–1998), New Jersey State Senate
- Michael Dwyer (North Dakota politician) (born 1952), North Dakota State Senate
- R. Budd Dwyer (1939–1987), Pennsylvania State Senate

== See also ==
- Senator Dyer (disambiguation)
