= Armistead Lindsay Long =

Brigadier general for the Confederate States of America

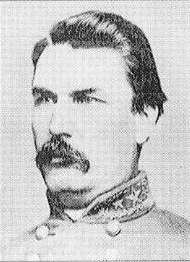
- Brigadier General Long
- Born: September 13, 1825; Campbell County, Virginia
- Died: April 29, 1891 (aged 65); Charlottesville, Virginia
- Burial place: Maplewood Cemetery, Charlottesville
- Relatives: Mary Heron Sumner (wife), Virginia Tunstall Long (daughter), Edwin Vose Long (son), Eugene Mclean Long (son)
- Military career
- Allegiance: United States of America; Confederate States of America
- Branch: United States Army; Confederate States Army
- Service years: 1851–1861 (USA); 1861–1865 (CSA)
- Rank: First Lieutenant (USA); Brigadier General (CSA)
- Unit: Army of Northern Virginia
- Conflicts: American Civil War: Battle of Fredericksburg; Battle of Chancellorsville; Battle of Gettysburg; Bristoe Campaign; Battle of Mine Run
- Other work: engineer, author

Armistead Lindsay Long (September 13, 1825 – April 29, 1891) was a brigadier general for the Confederate States of America, and the author of the 1886 book Memoirs of Robert E. Lee.

== Early life and career ==
Long was born in Campbell County, Virginia, to Armistead Long and Calista Rosser Cralle. He was an 1850 graduate of the United States Military Academy. He was appointed second lieutenant June 30, 1851, and served for two years at Fort Moultrie before being assigned to frontier duty in New Mexico.

After two years on the frontier, he was moved back to Fort McHenry and Barrancas Barracks and promoted to first lieutenant on July 1, 1854. In 1855 he was sent back for five more years of frontier-duty, this time serving in Kansas, Nebraska and Indian Territory with a brief stint at Fort Monroe.

== Civil War ==
Long was stationed at Augusta Arsenal when tensions began between the Northern and Southern states. He was among the garrison that was surrendered to state authorities. He was transferred to serve an aide-de-camp to General Sumner, and ended up marrying Sumner's daughter, Mary Heron Sumner, in 1860. They had their first child, Virginia Tunstall, on March 5, 1861.

When Sumner was summoned to lead the Department of the Pacific in California on June 10, 1861, Long resigned his commission in the United States Army the same day, and accepted a rank of major and chief of artillery in the Provisional Army of the Confederate States in western Virginia. He was later promoted to colonel dating from March 1861. Long accompanied its commander General William Loring in the Trans-Allegheny. During the summer and autumn of 1861, he acted as Inspector General, in addition to his regular duties.

He was summoned to appear before General Robert E. Lee at the end of the year, and the two of them would foster a close friendship over the coming years. Long was transferred to the southern coast as chief of artillery for both Generals John C. Pemberton and Robert E. Lee. When Lee became the military adviser to CSA President Jefferson Davis in early 1862, he appointed Long as his military secretary with the rank of colonel.

When on May 31, 1862, Lee took command of the Army of Northern Virginia, Long assumed his military secretary position on Lee's staff. He served Lee through the Seven Days, Northern Virginia Campaign of August 1862, Antietam Campaign, Fredericksburg Campaign, the campaign culminating in the Battle of Chancellorsville, and the Gettysburg campaign. Long was considered a valuable asset with "vigor and unfailing judgment".

On September 23, 1863, Long was promoted to brigadier general and placed in command of the artillery in Lieutenant General Richard S. Ewell's Second Corps. He was present at both the Bristoe Campaign and the subsequent Mine Run Campaign. Long commanded the artillery through the Overland Campaign, including the battles of the Wilderness, Spotsylvania Court House, and Cold Harbor. During Early's 1864 Shenandoah Valley Campaign he served intermittently as artillery chief for the Army of the Valley, but was often absent due to illness. He returned with the rest of the army to rejoin Lee and the Army of Northern Virginia around Petersburg and Richmond. Suffering from facial Neuralgia, he surrendered with the remnants of Lee's army at Appomattox Court House in April 1865.

In 1864, his wife gave birth to their second child, Edwin Vose.

== Postbellum career ==
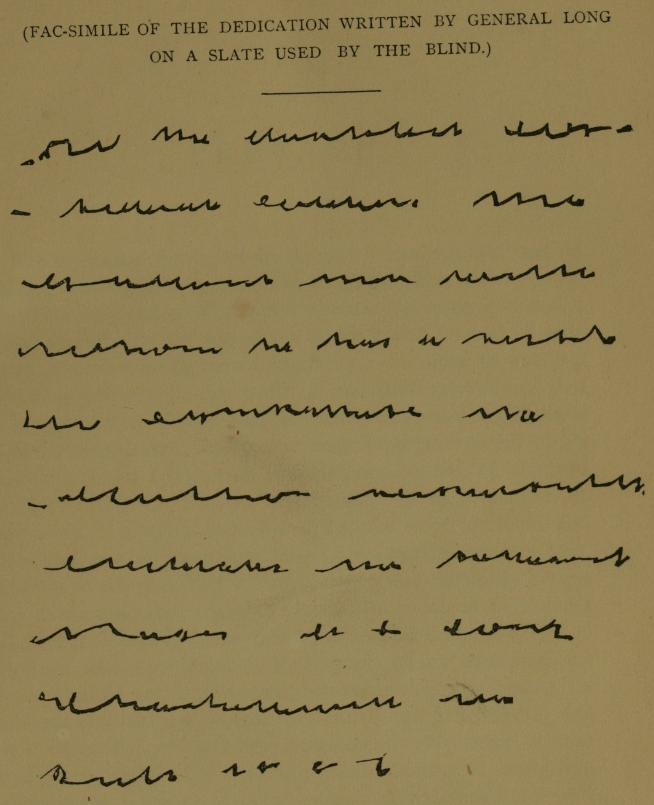
Example of Long's handwriting after his blindness, copied by his family members from his slate.

Following the war, Long was appointed Chief Engineer at the James River and Kanawha Canal from 1866 to 1869. On April 12, 1869, his wife gave birth to their third child, Eugene Mclean. The following year Long went blind, ostensibly from his exposure during military service.

On October 28, 1875, Long was elected to a post of Vice President of the Association of the Army of Northern Virginia along with Robert Ransom, Henry Heth, and William R. Terry, under the association's president W.H.F. "Rooney" Lee. Long was also an important member of the Southern Historical Society and was an important early proponent of what came to be known as the Lost Cause of the Confederacy movement.

President Ulysses S. Grant appointed Long's wife as postmistress for Charlottesville, Virginia. Although entirely blind, Long moved to Charlottesville and began writing Memoirs of Robert E. Lee. The lengthy biographical compendium of the service of the Army of West Virginia was published in 1886. Long had written two other manuscripts: A reminiscence of his army life and a biographical contrast between Stonewall Jackson and "Old Hickory" (Andrew Jackson). Long's manuscripts were sold in April 2015 at his Great-grandnephew, Charles Andrews', estate auction. Long's Old Hickory and Stonewall Jackson was subsequently edited by Frederick J. Reber II and published on Amazon.com. As of 2019, Long's manuscript on his own army life remains unpublished.

Following three years of ill health after the death of his eldest son, Long died in Charlottesville after requesting that his daughter build a fire in his room and bring him coffee. By the time she returned, he had slipped from consciousness and died shortly thereafter. He is buried in Maplewood Cemetery, Charlottesville.

== See also ==
- List of American Civil War generals (Confederate)
