= A. T. Van de Vanter =

American politician

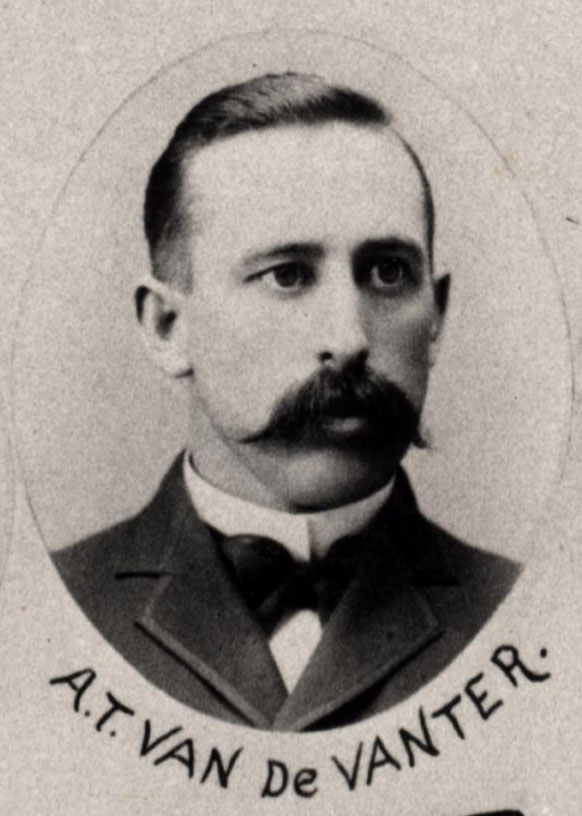
- Van de Vanter in 1891

Member of the Washington State Senate
- In office January 12, 1903 – January 14, 1907
- Preceded by: T. B. Sumner
- Succeeded by: Ralph D. Nichols
- Constituency: 31st
- In office January 7, 1891 – January 14, 1895
- Preceded by: W. J. Parkinson
- Succeeded by: John Wooding
- Constituency: 24th

Personal details
- Born: February 25, 1859 Sturgis, Michigan, U.S.
- Died: September 15, 1907 (aged 48) Van Asselt, King County, Washington, U.S.
- Party: Republican
- Relations: Willis Van Devanter
- Occupation: Businessman

Aaron T. Van de Vanter (February 25, 1859 – September 15, 1907) was an American politician and businessman in the state of Washington. He was the President of the Washington Central Improvement Company. He was elected as the first mayor of the city of Kent, on May 22, 1890. He also served on the town council in 1893, and was elected to the office of King county Sheriff in 1894. He served in the Washington State Senate from 1891 to 1895. He died of heart failure in 1907, as a result of a recent car accident.
