= George H. Baker =

American politician

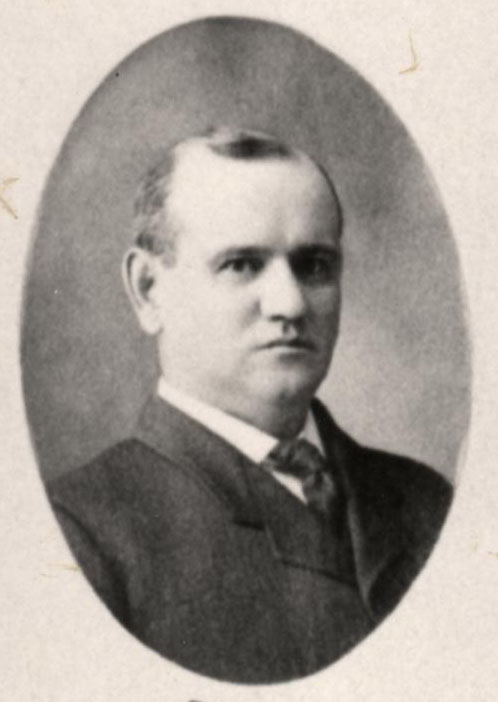
- Baker in 1905

President pro tempore of the Washington Senate
- In office January 9, 1905 – January 14, 1907
- Preceded by: T. B. Sumner
- Succeeded by: Jesse S. Jones

Member of the Washington State Senate
- In office 1899–1903 (12th district); 1903–1907 (16th district)

Member of the Washington House of Representatives for the 20th district
- In office 1897–1899

Personal details
- Born: November 1859 Prescott, United Province of Canada
- Died: December 23, 1928 (aged 69) Portland, Oregon, United States
- Party: Republican

George H. Baker (November 1859 – December 23, 1928) was an American politician in the state of Washington. He served in the Washington State Senate and Washington House of Representatives. From 1905 to 1907, he was President pro tempore of the Senate. He died after undergoing surgery for peritonitis in 1928.
