= B. C. Van Houten =

American politician

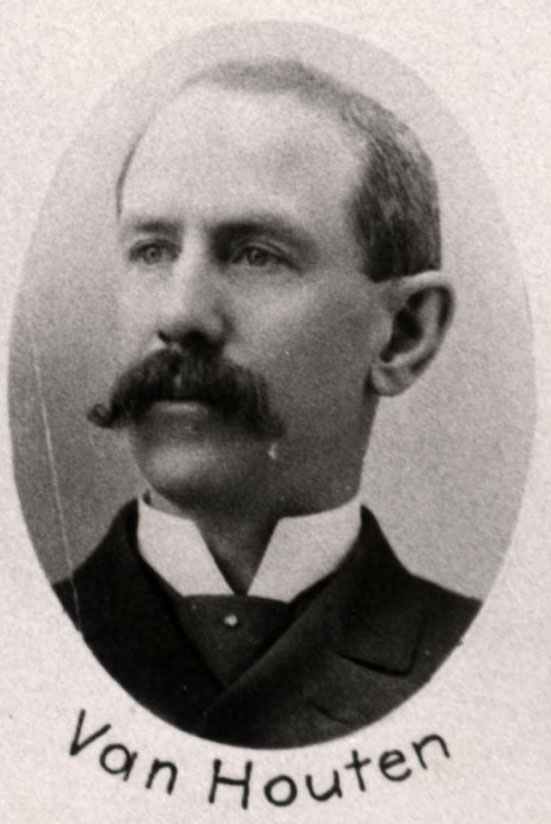
- Van Houten in 1895

President pro tempore of the Washington Senate
- In office January 14, 1895 – January 11, 1897
- Preceded by: Trusten P. Dyer
- Succeeded by: W. H. Plummer

Member of the Washington Senate from the 3rd district
- In office January 7, 1891 – January 11, 1897
- Preceded by: H. W. Fairweather
- Succeeded by: W. H. Plummer

Personal details
- Born: Byron Collins Van Houten; December 19, 1848 Middlesex, New York, U.S.
- Died: January 25, 1904 (aged 55) Seattle, Washington, U.S.
- Party: Republican

Byron Collins Van Houten (December 19, 1848 – January 25, 1904) was an American politician in the state of Washington. He served in the Washington State Senate from 1891 to 1897. From 1895 to 1897, he was President pro tempore of the Senate.

He was profiled in the brochure for the Northwest Industrial Exposition held in Spokane Falls in October 1890.
