= Pliny L. Allen =

American politician

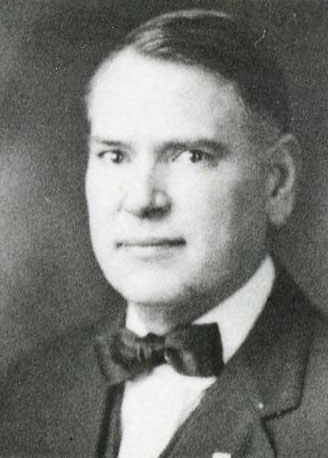
- Allen in 1919

President pro tempore of the Washington Senate
- In office January 13, 1913 – January 11, 1915
- Preceded by: W. H. Paulhamus
- Succeeded by: Edward L. French

Member of the Washington House of Representatives for the 43rd district
- In office 1919–1933

Member of the Washington State Senate for the 33rd district
- In office 1907–1915

Personal details
- Born: November 27, 1873 Wisconsin, United States
- Died: August 6, 1967 (aged 93) Washington, United States
- Party: Republican

Pliny Lee Allen (November 27, 1873 – August 6, 1967) was an American politician in the state of Washington. He served in the Washington House of Representatives and Washington State Senate. From 1913 to 1915, he was president pro tempore of the Senate.
