= Jean Sumner =

American internist and academic administrator

- Born: Jean Newsom Rawlings
- Education: Medical College of Georgia; Mercer University
- Children: 2
- Scientific career
- Fields: Internal medicine, rural health
- Workplaces: Mercer University

Jean Rawlings Sumner is an American internist and academic administrator specialized in rural health. She has served as the dean of the Mercer University School of Medicine since 2016. Sumner is a past president of the Georgia Board of Medicine.

== Life ==
Jean Newsom Rawlings was born to William Rawlings and his wife. While attending the Medical College of Georgia School of Nursing in 1972, Rawlings married pharmacist Joseph Carl Sumner. She earned a bachelor's and master's degree in nursing. In 1985, Sumner completed an internal medicine rotation. Sumner served as the senior class president. She earned a M.D. from Mercer University School of Medicine in 1986. She was part of its first graduating class. In 1989, Sumner completed a residency at The Medical Center, Navicent Health.

An internist, Sumner specializes in rural health. From 1990 to 1993, Sumner was the only practicing physician in Johnson County, Georgia. In 1993, after her prompting, the Memorial Hospital in Sandersville opened a clinic in Wrightsville. On November 1, 2014, Sumner became the first associate dean for rural health at the Mercer University School of Medicine. In 2016, she became dean of the school of medicine. In 2020, she received the Ralph O. Claypoole Sr. Memorial Award from the American College of Physicians. She is a fellow of the American College of Physicians. Sumner was president of the Georgia Board of Medicine.

Sumner and her husband have two children.
