= Wooding =

Wooding is a surname. Notable people with the surname include:

- Chris Wooding (born 1977), British writer
- John Wooding (1857–1931), American politician
- Lisa Wooding (born 1979), English field-hockey player
- Norman Wooding (1927–2005), British industrialist
- Sam Wooding (1895–1985), expatriate American jazz pianist, arranger and bandleader
