= Mercer University School of Medicine =

Private medical school in Macon, Georgia, US

Coordinates: 32.82774°N 83.64756°W

- Type: Private
- Established: 1982
- Dean: Jean Sumner
- Students: 387 (MD Students)
- Location: Macon, Georgia; Savannah, Georgia, USA
- Website: medicine.mercer.edu

Mercer University School of Medicine (MUSM) is the graduate medical school of Mercer University and a component of the Mercer University Health Sciences Center. It was founded in 1982 in Macon, Georgia, United States, and in 2008 opened a second campus in Savannah, Georgia with either site allowing students to complete all four requisite years of medical training. In 2012 MUSM developed a third site in Columbus, Georgia at which students could elect to complete their third and fourth years of training. In 2021, the Columbus transitioned to a full four-year campus.

MUSM adopts a mission that is heavily directed towards training future physicians and health professionals to meet the primary care and health care needs of rural and medically underserved areas in the state of Georgia, and as such, prospective matriculants must be Georgia residents. MUSM has teaching hospital affiliations with two of the five Level I trauma centers in Georgia, the Medical Center of Central Georgia in Macon, the second largest hospital in the state, and Memorial Health University Medical Center in Savannah, the largest hospital in eastern Georgia and southern South Carolina.

== Academic programs ==
In addition to the Doctor of Medicine degree offered by MUSM, a number of other degree programs are available through this institution:

- M.S. in Preclinical Sciences
- M.F.T. in Family Therapy
- Ph.D. in Rural Health Sciences
- Ph.D. in Biomedical Sciences

== MD Program Curriculum ==
Since its foundation in 1982, Mercer University School of Medicine has adopted a discussion based pre-clinical curriculum in lieu of the more traditional lecture format. This Problem-Based Learning (PBL) approach to training students in the basic medical sciences focuses around small group discussions wherein students share didactic responsibilities and interact much more actively than in a standard lecture. In this system, each PBL group meets several times a week to review relevant literature and discuss issues pertinent to the current subject matter, and although each group contains a tutor (a professor of MUSM), there is no truly identified roles of teacher and student—instead, these roles are shared by every member of the group. Also in contrast to lecture-based programs, which generally necessitate subject exams, the PBL program makes use of multidisciplinary exams more similar in scope of content (i.e. multiple disciplines) to the USMLE board examinations.

== Teaching affiliates and hospitals ==
=== Mercer Medicine ===
Mercer Medicine is the clinical component of the Mercer University School of Medicine through which faculty physicians of Internal and Family Medicine provide medical care to patients, while supporting a clinical learning environment for Mercer University medical students.

=== Atrium Health Navicent the Medical Center ===
The Atrium Health Navicent the Medical Center is located in Macon, Georgia and is the primary clinical site at which third and fourth year MUSM students in Macon complete their clinical training. This hospital is a teaching facility, and trains residents in five ACGME accredited programs: Family Medicine, Internal Medicine, OB/GYN, Pediatrics, and General Surgery. As of 1988, Atrium Health Navicent became the fourth hospital in the state of Georgia to function as a Level 1 Trauma Center.

=== Memorial University Medical Center ===
The Memorial University Medical Center is the affiliated hospital and medical training site for MUSM students in Savannah, Georgia. Memorial Hospital also allows for completion of six distinct ACGME accredited residencies: Family Medicine, Internal Medicine, OB/GYN, Pediatrics, General Surgery, and Diagnostic Radiology. Like MCCG, Memorial Hospital serves as a Level 1 Trauma Center. Memorial Hospital has received praise for its positive work environment: notably in 2007 when it was named one of Fortune magazine's "Top 100 Best Companies to Work For."

=== St. Francis Hospital/The Medical Center ===
Students completing their third and fourth years of training in Columbus, Georgia will rotate through both St. Francis Hospital and The Medical Center of Columbus. The Medical Center is an established teaching hospital, which has housed an ACGME accredited Family Medicine residency program since 1972.

== Relevant sources ==
- Skelton, W. Douglas and Ferances Carter Purcell. 2026. The Long Road Home: A Mercerians Journey. Macon, GA: Mercer University Press.
