= Eugene T. Wilson =

American politician

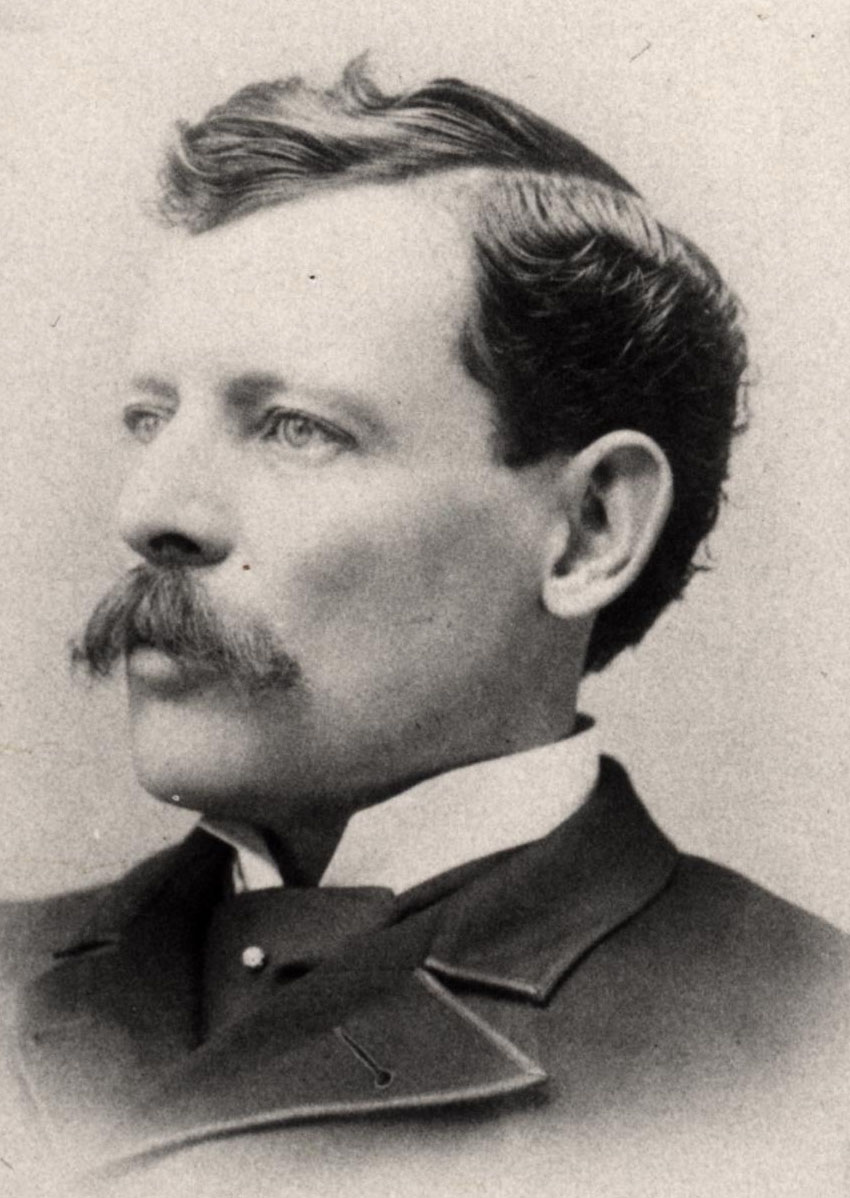
- Wilson in 1891

President pro tempore of the Washington Senate
- In office January 7, 1891 – January 9, 1893
- Preceded by: W. J. Parkinson
- Succeeded by: Trusten P. Dyer

Member of the Washington State Senate
- In office January 7, 1891 – January 9, 1893
- Preceded by: Jacob Hunsaker
- Succeeded by: C. I. Helm
- Constituency: 11th
- In office November 6, 1889 – January 7, 1891
- Preceded by: Constituency established
- Succeeded by: Platt A. Preston
- Constituency: 10th

Personal details
- Born: Eugene Tallmadge Wilson; December 11, 1852 Madison, Wisconsin, U.S.
- Died: November 17, 1923 (aged 70) Tacoma, Washington, U.S.
- Resting place: Seattle, Washington
- Party: Republican

Eugene Tallmadge Wilson (December 11, 1852 – November 17, 1923) was an American politician in the state of Washington. He served in the Washington State Senate from 1889 to 1893. From 1891 to 1893, he was President pro tempore of the Senate. He later resided in Montana, where he was a bank receiver. He died unexpectedly in Tacoma, Washington in 1923.
