= A. S. Ruth =

American politician

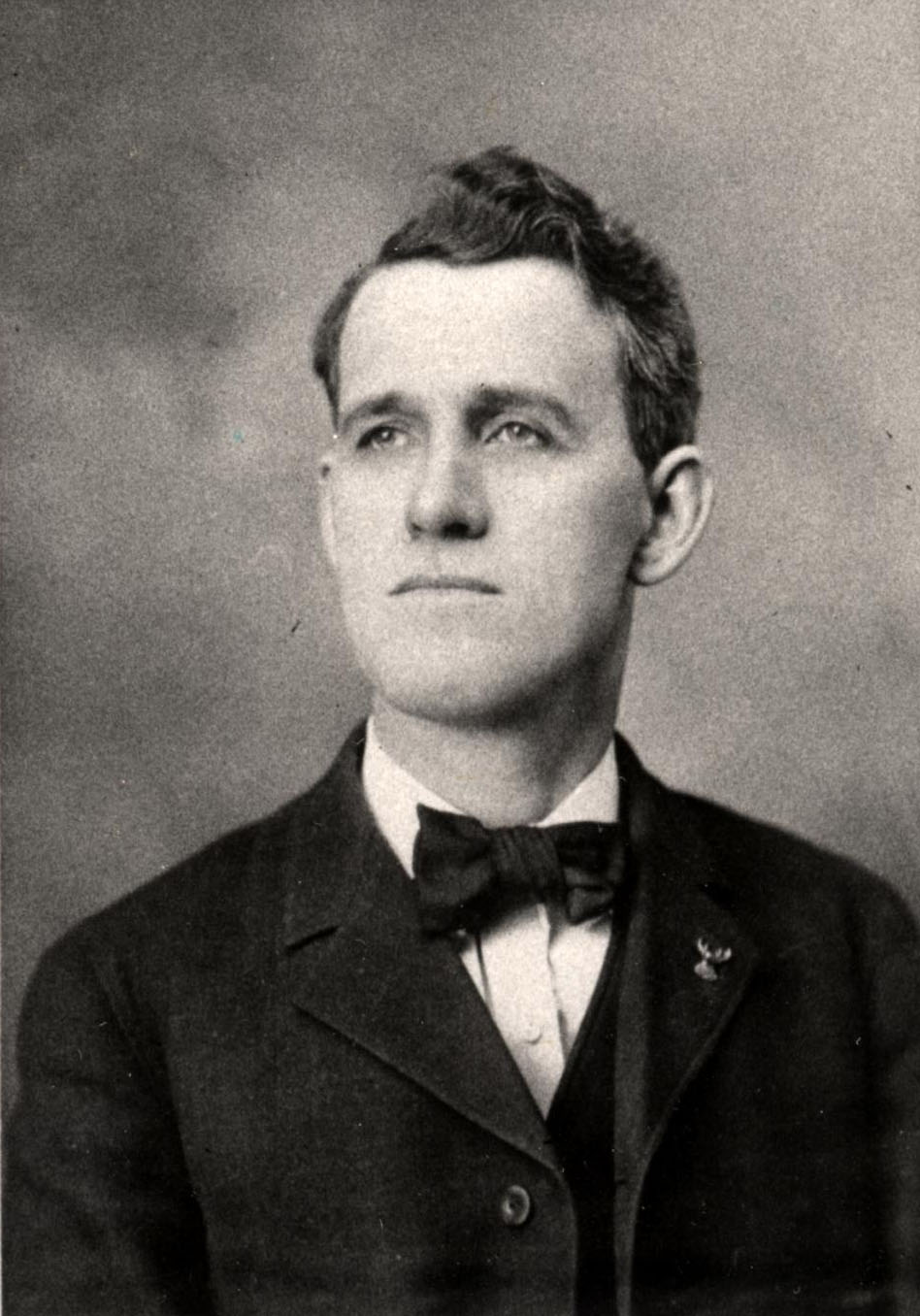
- Ruth in 1909

President pro tempore of the Washington Senate
- In office January 11, 1909 – January 9, 1911
- Preceded by: Jesse S. Jones
- Succeeded by: W. H. Paulhamus

Member of the Washington State Senate
- In office 1901–1903 (18th district); 1903–1913 (22nd district)

Personal details
- Born: December 18, 1865 Linneus, Maine, United States
- Died: June 30, 1915 (aged 49) California, United States
- Party: Republican

Alfred S. Ruth (December 18, 1865 – June 30, 1915) was an American politician in the state of Washington. He served in the Washington State Senate. From 1909 to 1911, he was president pro tempore of the senate.
