= W. J. Parkinson =

American politician

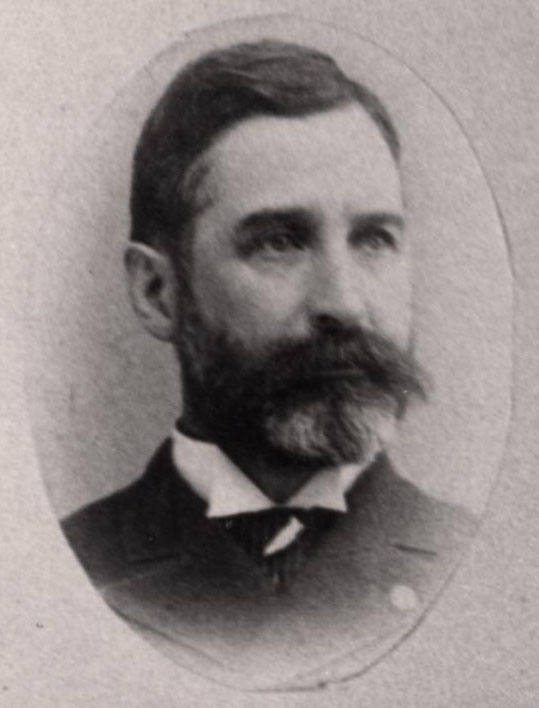
- Parkinson in 1889

President pro tempore of the Washington Senate
- In office November 6, 1889 – January 7, 1891
- Preceded by: Office established
- Succeeded by: Eugene T. Wilson

Member of the Washington State Senate
- In office January 7, 1891 – January 9, 1893
- Preceded by: Constituency established
- Succeeded by: W. H. Gilbert
- Constituency: 33rd
- In office November 6, 1889 – January 7, 1891
- Preceded by: Constituency established
- Succeeded by: A. T. Van de Vanter
- Constituency: 24th

Personal details
- Born: May 10, 1844 Ireland
- Died: January 7, 1902 (aged 57) Jackson, Mississippi, U.S.
- Party: Republican

William J. Parkinson (May 10, 1844 – January 7, 1902) was an American politician in the state of Washington. He served in the Washington State Senate from 1889 to 1893. From 1889 to 1891, he was President pro tempore of the Senate. He died of a heart attack in 1902.
