= Edwin Vose Sumner Jr. =

US Army general (1835-1912)

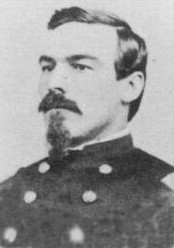
- Edwin V. Sumner, Jr., circa 1865
- Born: 16 August 1835; Carlisle, Pennsylvania
- Died: 23 August 1912 (Aged 77) San Francisco, California
- Allegiance: United States
- Branch: Union Army; United States Army
- Service years: 1861–1899
- Rank: Brigadier General
- Conflicts: American Civil War; Ghost Dance War

Edwin Vose Sumner Jr. (August 16, 1835 – August 23, 1912) was a general in the United States Army. Born at Carlisle, Pennsylvania; he was the son of General Edwin Vose Sumner, one of the oldest generals to serve during the American Civil War.

== Civil War service ==
Edwin V. Sumner Jr. began his military career shortly after the outbreak of the American Civil War, when he was commissioned as a second lieutenant in the 1st U.S. Cavalry Regiment on August 5, 1861. He was promoted to first lieutenant on November 12, 1861. He served as aide de camp to Major General George Stoneman between January 1863 and August 1863. He was promoted to major of volunteers on May 19, 1863. He was mustered out of the volunteers on August 15, 1863.

On September 23, 1863, Sumner was appointed a captain in the Regular Army. He served as an Assistant Inspector General of the cavalry in the Army of the James in 1864 until July 21, 1864. He was appointed brevet major in the regular army for his service at the Battle of Todd's Tavern. He served as an Assistant Inspector General of the cavalry in the Department of West Virginia starting July 21, 1864.

On September 8, 1864, he was appointed colonel of the 1st Regiment New York Mounted Rifles. He commanded the 3rd Brigade of the Cavalry Division, XVIII Corps (Union Army), Army of the James between February 5, 1865, and March 28, 1865.

Sumner was mustered out of the volunteers and reverted to his Regular Army rank of captain on September 29, 1865.

On January 13, 1866, President Andrew Johnson nominated Sumner for appointment to the grade of brevet brigadier general of volunteers, to rank from March 13, 1865, and the United States Senate confirmed the appointment on March 12, 1866.

== Post Civil War ==
After the Civil War, Sumner served in the Indian Wars. He was appointed major in the 5th U.S. Cavalry Regiment, March 4, 1879, lieutenant colonel in the 8th U.S. Cavalry Regiment, April 15, 1890, and colonel of the 7th U.S. Cavalry Regiment, November 10, 1894. In April 1890, he participated in the Pine Ridge Campaign in which the 8th Cavalry was ordered to establish a camp on the Cheyanne River in order to observe a band of Miniconjou Lakota under the leadership of Big Foot. The relationship between the Lakota and the U.S. Cavalry was initially amicable, but this soon deteriorated after incidents of Lakota harassing soldiers, attempting to steal horses, and reports that the Lakota were buying up rifles and ammunition in preparation for battle. Sumner was ordered to arrest and disarm Big Foot and his band, but failed to do so when the band rode away to the Pine Ridge Reservation.

In 1890, he was elected a member of the Massachusetts Society of the Cincinnati by right of his collateral descent from Major Job Sumner, a veteran of the American Revolutionary War.

At the beginning of the Spanish–American War, he was appointed brigadier general of Volunteers on May 27, 1898, and was discharged from the Volunteers on February 24, 1899.

== Later life ==
Sumner was promoted to brigadier general in the Regular Army on March 27, 1899, and retired from the United States Army three days later after 37 years of service.

Sumner died at San Francisco, California on August 28, 1912. He was buried at the United States Military Academy at West Point, New York.

== Family ==
He was married to Margaret Forster, the daughter of General John Forster (1777–1863). His brother was Major General Samuel S. Sumner.

== Awards ==
- Civil War Campaign Medal
- Indian Campaign Medal
- Spanish War Service Medal (posthumously eligible)

== See also ==
- List of American Civil War brevet generals (Union)
