= W. H. Paulhamus =

American politician

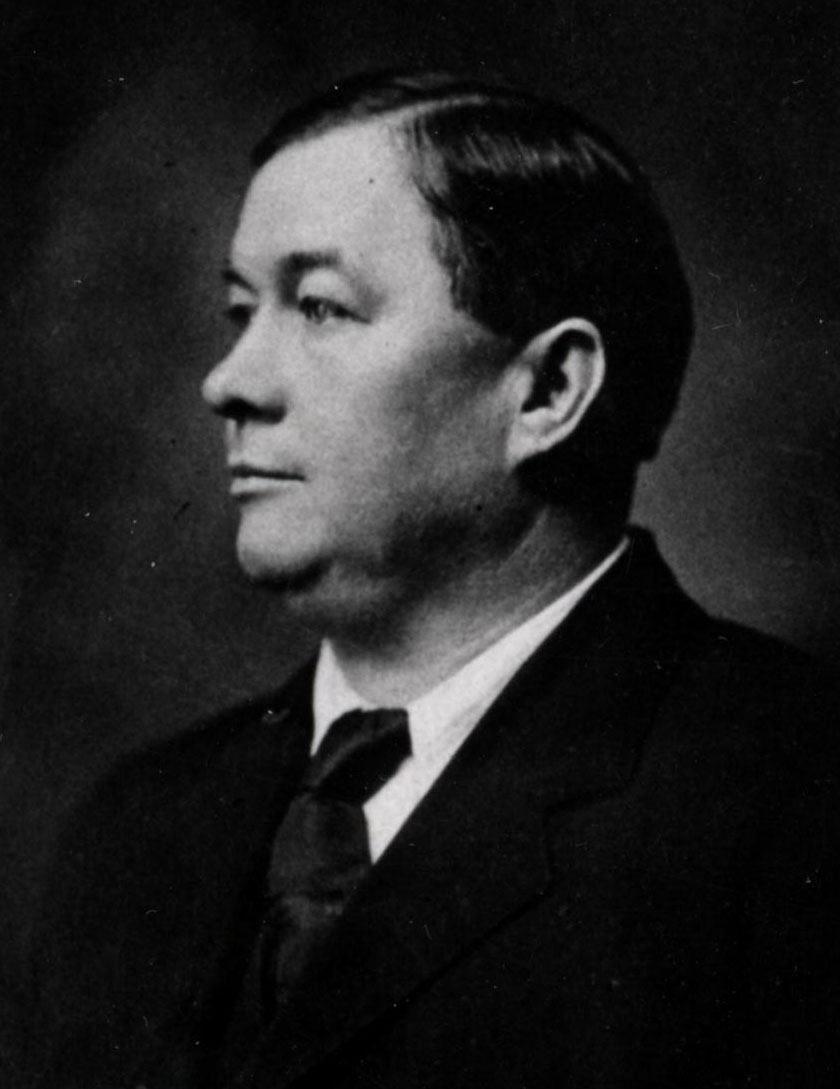
- Paulhamus in 1911

President pro tempore of the Washington Senate
- In office January 9, 1911 – January 13, 1913
- Preceded by: A. S. Ruth
- Succeeded by: Pliny L. Allen

Member of the Washington State Senate for the 25th district
- In office 1907–1913

Personal details
- Born: March 4, 1865 Pennsylvania, United States
- Died: April 15, 1925 (aged 60) Puyallup, Washington, United States
- Party: Republican

William Hall Paulhamus (March 4, 1865 – April 15, 1925) was an American politician in the state of Washington. He served Washington State Senate from 1907 to 1913. From 1911 to 1913, he was President pro tempore of the Senate.
