= Charlotte Sumner =

American neurologist

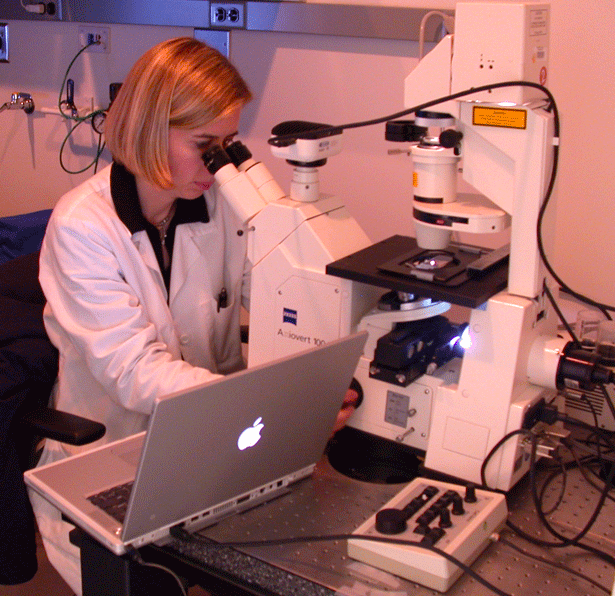
- Sumner in 2019, capturing images of brainstem sections from a patient who died of an inherited motoneuron disease.
- Education: Princeton University (B.A.); Perelman School of Medicine at the University of Pennsylvania (M.D.)
- Scientific career
- Fields: Neurology, Neuroscience, Genetic Medicine
- Workplaces: Johns Hopkins School of Medicine

Charlotte Jane Sumner is an American neurologist. She is a professor in the Departments of Neurology, Neuroscience, and Genetic Medicine at Johns Hopkins School of Medicine. Dr. Sumner cares for patients with genetically mediated neuromuscular diseases and directs a laboratory focused on developing treatments for these diseases. She co-directs the Johns Hopkins Muscular Dystrophy Association Care Center, the Spinal Muscular Atrophy (SMA), and the Charcot-Marie-Tooth (CMT) clinics, which deliver multidisciplinary clinical care, engage in international natural history studies, and provide therapeutics.

== Education ==
Dr. Sumner graduated with a Bachelor of Arts in Ecology and Evolutionary Biology, magna cum laude, from Princeton University in 1991. She completed a doctor of medicine at Perelman School of Medicine at the University of Pennsylvania and was recognized for her investigative and clinical work with the Dr. O.H. Pepper Award in 1996. She was a Howard Hughes Medical Research Scholar at National Institutes of Health between 1993 and 1994. She was an intern in internal medicine from 1996 to 1997 at University of California, San Francisco (UCSF) and completed a residency in neurology at UCSF from 1997 to 2000. From 2000 to 2001, she completed a fellowship in neuromuscular disease at Johns Hopkins School of Medicine. She was a fellow in neurogenetics in Kenneth Fischbeck's lab at the National Institute of Neurological Disorders and Stroke from 2001 to 2006.

== Career ==
Dr. Sumner joined the faculty at the Johns Hopkins University School of Medicine as an assistant professor of neurology in 2006. In 2011, Sumner became an assistant professor of neuroscience. She became an associate professor of Neurology and Neuroscience in 2011 and a full Professor of As of 2019.

=== Clinical Activities and Teaching ===
Dr. Sumner cares for patients with genetically mediated neuromuscular diseases. Her practice is notable for a focus on individuals with inherited neuromuscular disorders of peripheral nerves and motor neurons, including spinal muscular atrophy (SMA) and Charcot-Marie-Tooth (CMT) disease. She is the coeditor of the only comprehensive book on SMA: Spinal Muscular Atrophy Disease Mechanisms and Therapy. As part of a commitment to make gene targeting therapeutics accessible throughout the world, she chairs the Spinraza Individual Patient Humanitarian Access Program Medical Expert Committee. She is committed to teaching at all levels including training individuals underrepresented in biomedicine. She has been the recipient of several teaching awards.

=== Research ===
Dr. Sumner's laboratory research focuses on the genetic and cellular pathogenesis of motor neuron and peripheral nerve disorders with particular attention to identification of disease genes, characterization of molecular and cellular disease mechanisms, and development of therapeutics. Her research efforts contributed to the scientific foundations leading to three FDA-approved, gene-targeted treatments for proximal spinal muscular atrophy (SMA) caused by mutations of the survival motor neuron 1 gene (SMN1)-the first such treatments for a neurodegenerative disease. She also identified mutations of a cell surface expressed ion channel, transient receptor potential vanilloid 4 (TRPV4) as a cause of SMA and CMT2 and is currently developing treatment for this disorder.

Her research contributions have been recognized by elected membership in the American Society of Clinical Investigation and the Association of American Physicians. She serves as an advisor to multiple SMA, CMT, and peripheral neuropathy nonprofit foundations, and private companies.

=== Honors and Awards ===
In 2025, Dr. Sumner was elected to the National Academy of Medicine as a member of its Class of 2025.

== Personal life ==
Dr. Sumner is a member of the LGBT community and participates in the OUTList network of mentors at Johns Hopkins University.
