= Trusten P. Dyer =

American politician

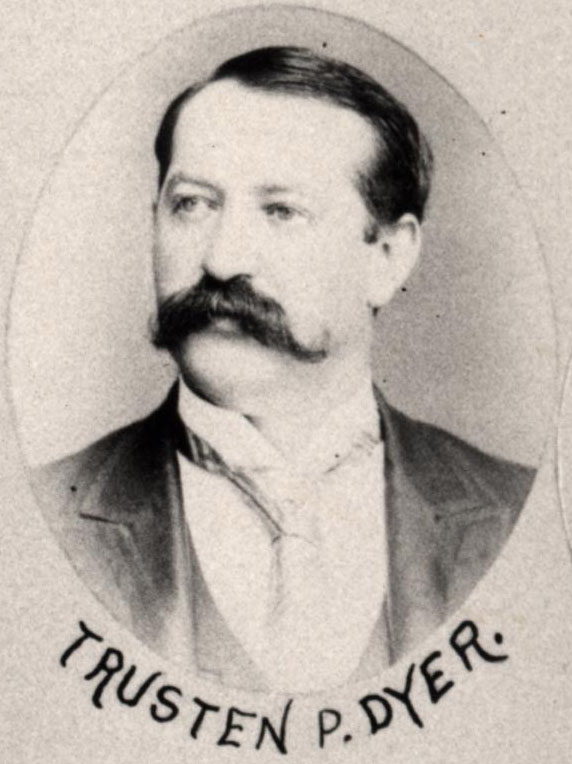
- Dyer in 1891

President pro tempore of the Washington Senate
- In office January 9, 1893 – January 14, 1895
- Preceded by: Eugene T. Wilson
- Succeeded by: B. C. Van Houten

Member of the Washington State Senate for the 27th district
- In office 1891–1895

Personal details
- Born: May 27, 1856 Warren County, Missouri, United States
- Died: December 28, 1926 (aged 70) Los Angeles County, California, United States
- Party: Republican

Trusten Polk Dyer (May 27, 1856 – December 18, 1926) was an American politician in the state of Washington. He served in the Washington State Senate from 1891 to 1895. From 1893 to 1895, he was President pro tempore of the Senate.
