= The Medical Center, Navicent Health =

Atrium Health Navicent The Medical Center
- Atrium Health Navicent
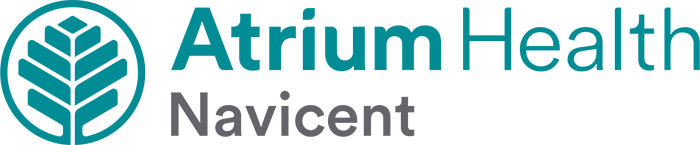

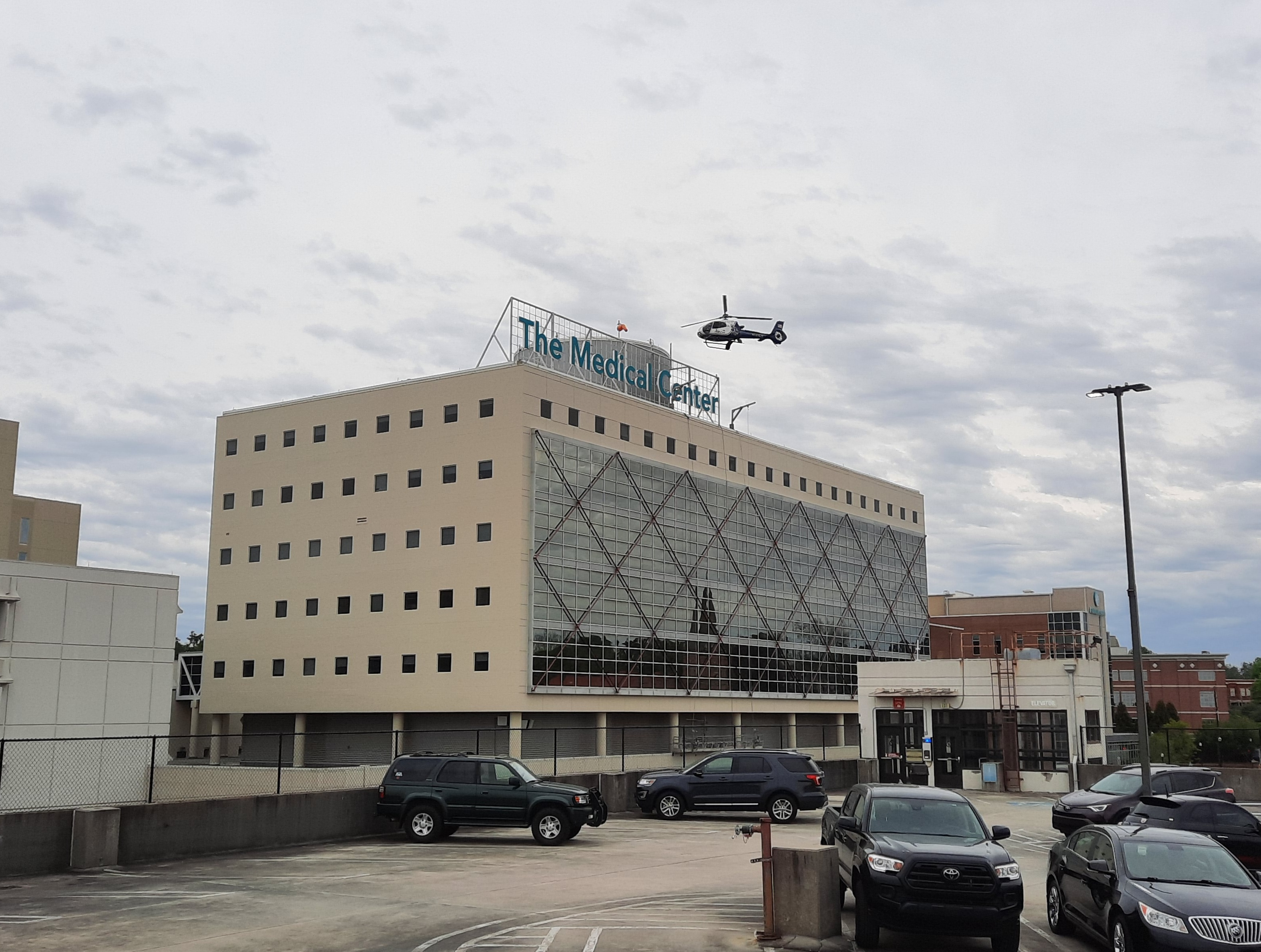
- The Medical Center with helicopter taking off

Geography
- Location: 777 Hemlock St., Macon, Georgia, United States
- Coordinates: 32°49′58.8″N 83°38′10.2″W

Organization
- Affiliated university: Mercer University; Mercer School of Medicine
- Network: Atrium Health

Services
- Emergency department: Level I trauma center
- Beds: 637

Helipads
- Helipad: Yes FAA LID: 77GE

History
- Former name: The Medical Center of Central Georgia
- Founded: 1895

Links
- Website: https://www.navicenthealth.org/
- Lists: Hospitals in Georgia

The Atrium Health Navicent Medical Center, is a 637-bed hospital located in Macon, Georgia. Formerly known as The Medical Center of Central Georgia (MCCG), the hospital is part of Atrium Health. MCNH is the second-largest hospital in Georgia, behind Grady Memorial Hospital in Atlanta. MCNH is a teaching hospital affiliated with Mercer University School of Medicine and various nursing schools. MCNH serves 30 primary counties throughout central and southern Georgia, an area of approximately 750,000 residents, as well as patients from the broader region. Atrium Health Navicent EMS serves Baldwin, Bibb, Jones, Treutlen, Twiggs and Wilkinson counties. The Beverly Knight Olson Children's Hospital, Navicent Health is located adjacent to MCNH.

On February 8, 2018, it was announced that Navicent Health would merge with the North Carolina–based healthcare system Atrium Health.

== History ==
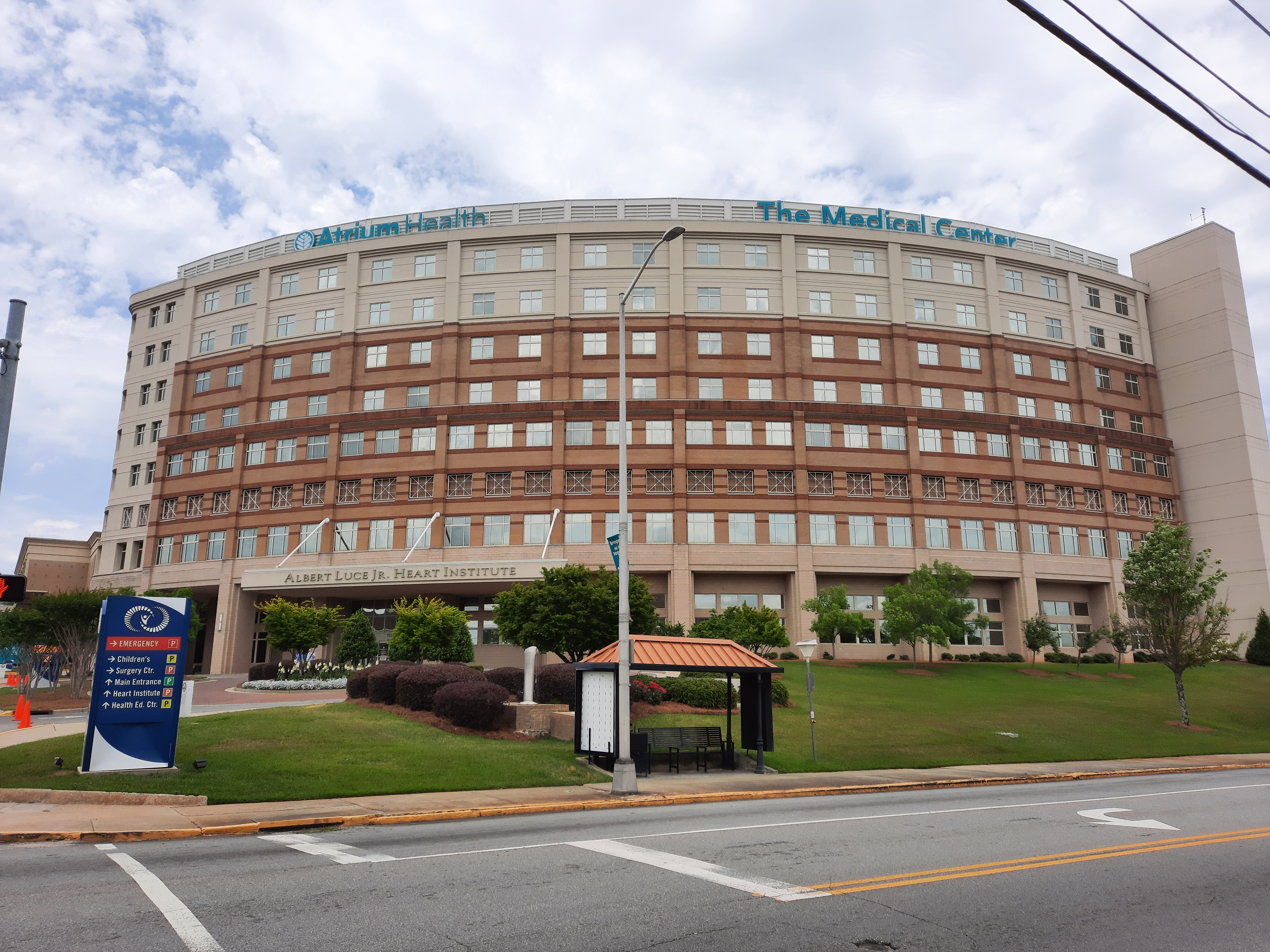
Albert Luce Jr. Heart Institute

In March 1895, the Medical Center, then known as the Macon Hospital, was opened. Its administrator was an Atlanta physician named Olin Weaver. In 1915, the city of Macon assumed ownership of the hospital. In 1960, the hospital became a member of the American Hospital Association, though it wasn't until 11 years later, in 1971, that the name was changed to The Medical Center of Central Georgia. On September 3, 2014, Central Georgia Health System, which includes The Medical Center and more than 30 additional entities, announced its new brand identity – Navicent Health. The new Navicent Health brand unified and identified each facility and service line within the health system for the very first time. Navicent Health includes MCNH as well as Rehabilitation Hospital, Navicent Health; Beverly Knight Olson Children's Hospital, Navicent Health; Navicent Health Foundation; Medical Center of Peach County, Navicent Health; Carlyle Place, Navicent Health; Pine Point, Navicent Health; Wellness Center, Navicent Health; and most recently, Navicent Health Baldwin.

On February 8, 2018, it was announced that Navicent Health would merge with North Carolina-based healthcare system Atrium Health. They announced on December 20, 2018, that the agreement combining the two organizations had been signed, with Atrium being the controlling party.

MCNH is an academic medical center, Level 1 Trauma Center, and serves a service area of 30 primary counties and a population of nearly 750,000 persons. MCNH has over 4,500 employees and a medical staff of approximately 700 physicians. As the second largest hospital in Georgia, it is licensed for 637 beds, including pediatrics, medical-surgical, trauma and cardiac surgery. The Emergency Center, with helipad capability and three urgent care centers, treats over 140,000 visitors per year. MCNH provides a broad range of community-based outpatient diagnostic, primary care, wellness and comprehensive rehabilitation services. It is the primary academic hospital for Mercer University School of Medicine, providing residency and fellowship programs for over 100 residents and is affiliated with multiple universities as a clinical education site.
