= Woodrising =

Woodrising may refer to:

- Woodrising, New South Wales, a suburb of the City of Lake Macquarie in New South Wales, Australia
- Woodrising, Norfolk, a village in the Breckland district, Norfolk, England
