= John Wooding =

American politician

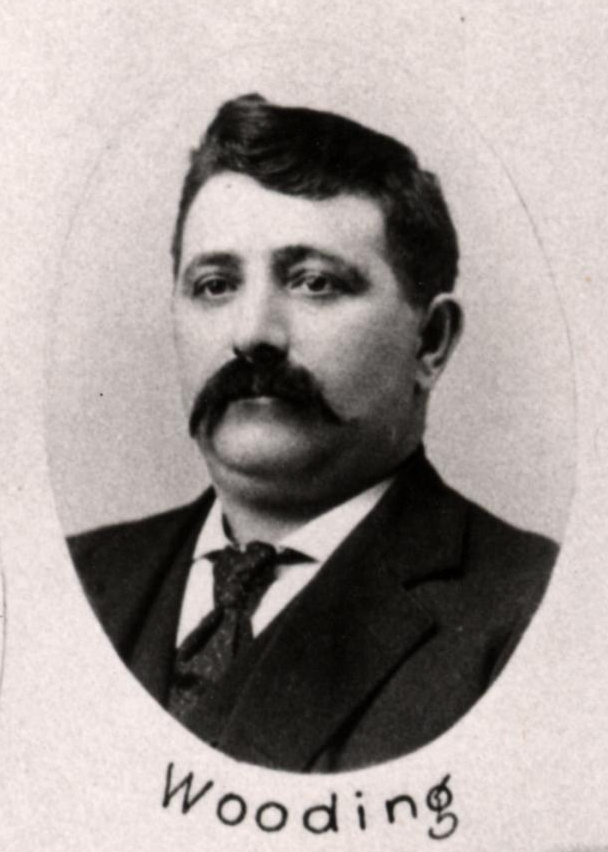
- Wooding in 1895

Member of the Washington Senate from the 24th district
- In office January 14, 1895 – January 14, 1901
- Preceded by: A. T. Van de Vanter
- Succeeded by: John James Smith

King County Commissioner
- In office January 1, 1889 – January 1, 1895
- Preceded by: Alex Allen
- Succeeded by: F. O. Nickerson

Personal details
- Born: February 10, 1858 Saginaw, Michigan, U.S.
- Died: December 17, 1931 (aged 74) Auburn, Washington, U.S.
- Party: Republican

John Wooding (February 10, 1857 – December 17, 1931) was an American politician in the state of Washington. He served in the Washington State Senate from 1895 to 1901.
