= Samuel S. Sumner =

Samuel Storrow Sumner
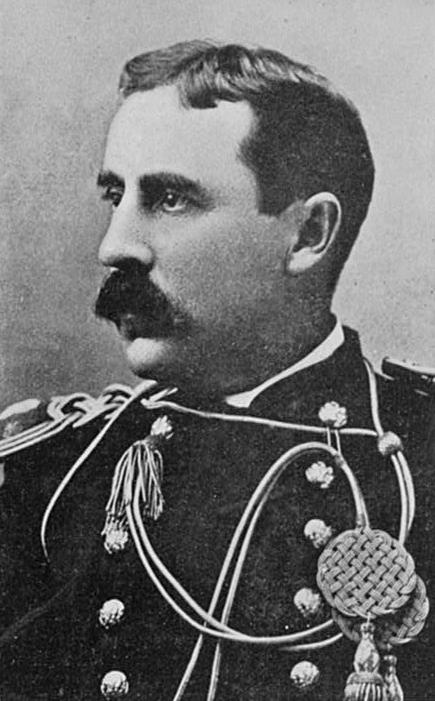
- Illustration in Harper's Weekly, 1898
- Born: February 6, 1842; Carlisle Barracks, Pennsylvania, U.S.
- Died: July 26, 1937 (aged 95); Brookline, Massachusetts, U.S.
- Burial place: Arlington National Cemetery
- Relatives: Edwin V. Sumner (father); Edwin Vose Sumner, Jr. (brother)
- Military career
- Allegiance: United States
- Branch: United States Army
- Service years: 1861–1906
- Rank: Major General
- Commands: 6th US Cavalry
- Conflicts: American Civil War; Battle of Seven Pines; Battle of Antietam; American Indian Wars; Spanish–American War; Battle of Las Guasimas; Battle of San Juan Hill; Siege of Santiago; China Relief Expedition; Philippine–American War

Samuel Storrow Sumner (1842–1937) was a United States Army general who served during the Spanish–American War, Boxer Rebellion, and Philippine–American War.

== Early life ==
Sumner was born in Carlisle Barracks, Pennsylvania, on February 6, 1842. His name commemorates his father's mentor and friend, Samuel Appleton Storrow (1787–1837), who served as a Judge Advocate in the U.S. Army from 1816 to 1821.

== Civil War service ==
He served in the Union army during the Civil War. Shortly after the outbreak of the war he was commissioned as a 2nd lieutenant in the 2nd Cavalry Regiment on June 11, 1861. He was later transferred to the 5th Cavalry on August 3, 1861. For much of the war, he served on the staff of his father, General Edwin V. Sumner. He participated in the Battle of Fair Oaks, Virginia, on June 1, 1862.

He was promoted to 1st lieutenant on July 17, 1862, and to aide-de-camp with the rank of captain on August 20 of the same year. He fought at the Battle of Antietam on September 17, 1862. On March 30, 1864, he was assigned as a captain in the 5th Cavalry. During the war, he received brevets (honorary promotions) to 1st lieutenant, captain, and major for "gallant and meritorious service".

== Post Civil War ==
After the war's end, Sumner stayed in the army and served in the cavalry during the Indian Wars as did his brother Civil War brevet brigadier general Edwin Vose Sumner, Jr. He was promoted to major of the 8th Cavalry on April 2, 1879. He received a brevet to lieutenant colonel on February 27, 1890, for "gallant service in action against Indians at Summit Springs, Colorado on 11 July 1869. He was promoted to lieutenant colonel of the 6th Cavalry on February 18, 1891, and to colonel in command of the 6th Cavalry on May 23, 1896.

== Spanish–American War ==
When the Spanish–American War broke out in May 1898, Sumner was appointed brigadier general of volunteers and placed in command of the 1st Brigade, Cavalry Division, V Corps. He was sent to Cuba with the corps and led his brigade into action at the Battle of Las Guasimas. When Joseph Wheeler fell ill, Sumner temporarily assumed command of the Cavalry Division. He was still in command of the division when the fighting at the Battle of San Juan Hill began. However, it is said that when Wheeler heard the sound of battle he rose from his sick bed and rushed to take command of the division. Sumner returned to command his brigade for the rest of the battle and in the Siege of Santiago. In September, he was appointed major general of volunteers. He was discharged from the volunteers and reverted to his Regular Army rank of colonel on April 15, 1899.

After the war with Spain ended, Sumner served as a military attaché to American Embassy in London. During the Boxer Rebellion, Summer was again in field command and led a brigade in the China Relief Expedition.

He then was sent to the Philippines and commanded the 1st District, Department of Southern Luzon during the Philippine–American War. On February 4, 1901, he was promoted to brigadier general in the Regular Army.

He was a companion of the District of Columbia Commandery of the Military Order of the Loyal Legion of the United States. He was also a companion of the Pennsylvania Commandery of the Military Order of Foreign Wars.

He continued to serve in the Army until his retirement at the age of 64 in 1906. He died on July 26, 1937, at his home in Brookline, Massachusetts, and is buried in Arlington National Cemetery.

== Awards ==
- Civil War Campaign Medal
- Indian Campaign Medal
- Spanish Campaign Medal
- China Campaign Medal
- Philippine Campaign Medal
