= Edwin Vose Sumner =

U.S. Union Army general

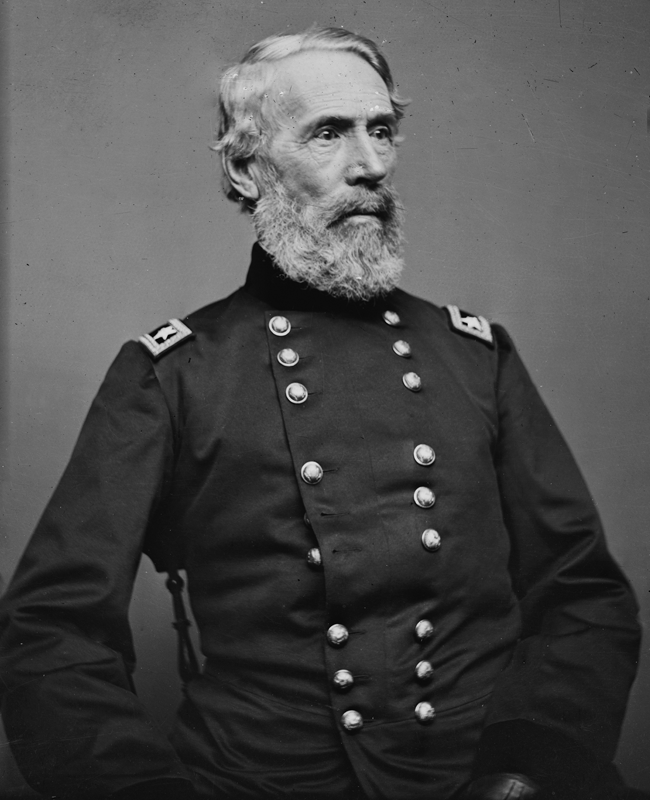
- Born: January 30, 1797; Boston, Massachusetts, U.S.
- Died: March 21, 1863 (aged 66); Syracuse, New York, U.S.
- Burial place: Oakwood Cemetery (Syracuse, New York)
- Spouse: Hannah W. Foster
- Children: 6, including Edwin Jr. and Samuel
- Military career
- Allegiance: United States; Union
- Branch: United States Army; Union Army
- Service years: 1819–1863
- Rank: Major General
- Nicknames: Bull, Bull Head
- Commands: 1st U.S. Cavalry; Department of the Pacific; II Corps, Army of the Potomac
- Conflicts: Black Hawk War; Mexican–American War; Battle of Cerro Gordo; Battle of Molino del Rey; American Indian Wars; Bleeding Kansas; American Civil War; Peninsula campaign; Battle of Williamsburg; Seven Days Battles; Battle of Glendale; Maryland campaign; Battle of Antietam; Battle of Fredericksburg

Edwin Vose Sumner (January 30, 1797 – March 21, 1863) was a career United States Army officer who became a Union Army general and the oldest field commander of any Army Corps on either side during the American Civil War. His nicknames "Bull" or "Bull Head" came both from his great booming voice and a legend that a musket ball once bounced off his head.

Sumner fought in the Black Hawk War, with distinction in the Mexican–American War, on the Western frontier, and in the Eastern Theater for the first half of the Civil War. He led the II Corps of the Army of the Potomac through the Peninsula Campaign, the Seven Days Battles, and the Maryland Campaign, and the Right Grand Division of the Army during the Battle of Fredericksburg. He died in March 1863 while awaiting transfer.

== Early life and career ==
Sumner was born in Boston, Massachusetts, to Elisha Sumner and Nancy Vose Sumner. His early schooling was in Milton Academy in Milton, Massachusetts. He was a first cousin once removed of Charles Sumner, the abolitionist, and a distant cousin of the statesman, Increase Sumner, and his son, the historian William H. Sumner.

In 1819, after losing interest in a mercantile career in Troy, New York, he entered the United States Army as a second lieutenant in the 2nd US Infantry Regiment on March 3, 1819. He was promoted to first lieutenant on January 25, 1825.

Sumner's military appointment was facilitated by Samuel Appleton Storrow, Judge Advocate Major on the staff of General Jacob Jennings Brown of the Northern department. (Storrow had previously served as a mentor to Sumner in Boston.) In recognition of their long-standing friendship, Sumner would later name one of his sons Samuel Storrow Sumner.

He married Hannah Wickersham Foster (1804–1880) on March 31, 1822. They had six children together: Nancy, Margaret Foster, Sarah Montgomery, Mary Heron, Edwin Vose Jr., and Samuel Storrow Sumner. His son Samuel was a general during the Spanish–American War, Boxer Rebellion, and the Philippine–American War. Sumner's daughter, Mary Heron, married General Armistead L. Long in 1860.

Sumner later served in the Black Hawk War and in various Indian campaigns. On March 4, 1833, he was promoted to the rank of captain and assigned to command B Company, the United States Regiment of Dragoons (later First US Dragoons), immediately upon its creation by Congress.

In 1838, he commanded the cavalry instructional establishment at Carlisle Barracks in Pennsylvania. He was assigned to Ft. Atkinson, Iowa Territory, from 1842 until 1845. He was the fort's commander during most of that period. He was promoted to major of the 2nd Dragoons on June 30, 1846. During the Mexican–American War, Sumner was brevetted for bravery at the Battle of Cerro Gordo (to lieutenant colonel). It was here that he gained the nickname "Bull Head" because of a story about a musket ball that bounced off his head during the battle. At the Molino del Rey he received the brevet rank of colonel. He was promoted to lieutenant colonel of the 1st US Dragoons on July 23, 1848. He served as the military governor of the New Mexico Territory from 1851 to 1853 and was promoted to colonel of the 1st U.S. Cavalry on March 3, 1855.

In 1856 Sumner commanded Fort Leavenworth, Kansas, and became involved in the crisis known as Bleeding Kansas. In 1857, as commander of the 1st Cavalry Regiment (1855), he led a punitive expedition against the Cheyenne, and in 1858 he commanded the Department of the West. On January 7, 1861, Sumner wrote to President-elect Abraham Lincoln, advising him to carry a weapon at all times. Lt. Gen. Winfield Scott assigned Sumner as the senior officer to accompany Lincoln from Springfield, Illinois, to Washington, D.C., in March 1861.

== Civil War ==
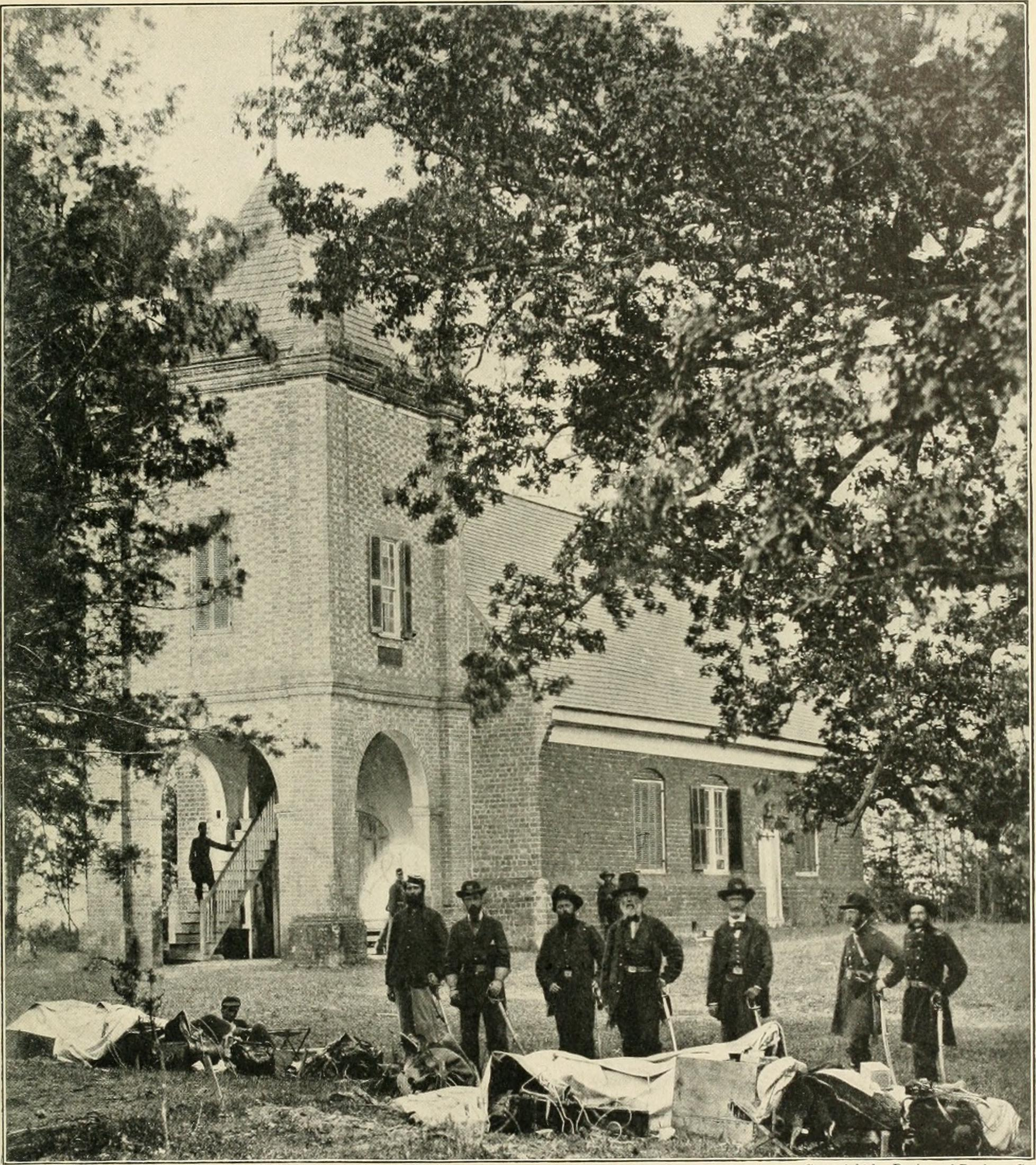
Edwin Vose Sumner and his staff ca. 1861-1862

In February 1861, Brig. Gen. David E. Twiggs was dismissed from the Army for treason by outgoing U.S. President James Buchanan, and on May 12, 1861, Sumner was nominated by the newly inaugurated Lincoln to replace Twiggs as one of only three brigadier generals in the regular army, with date of rank March 16. Sumner was thus the first new Union general created by the secession crisis. He was then sent to replace Brig. Gen. Albert Sidney Johnston, then in command of the Department of the Pacific in California, and thus took no part in the 1861 campaigns of the war. When Sumner left for California, his son-in-law Armistead Lindsay Long resigned his commission and enlisted with the Confederate Army eventually becoming Robert E. Lee's military secretary and an artillery brigadier general.

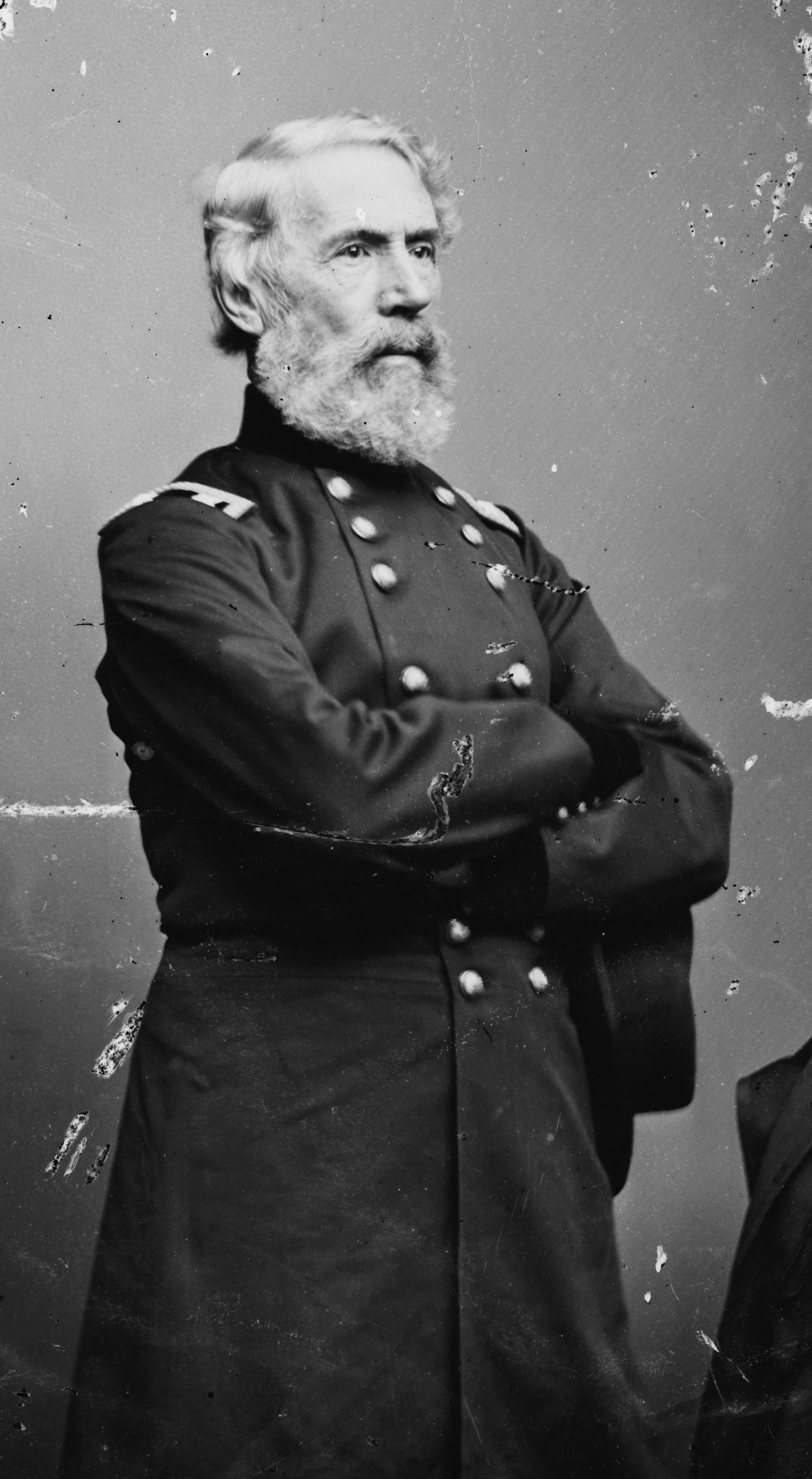
An image of Sumner by Mathew Brady or Levin C. Handy

In November 1861, Sumner was brought back east to command a division. When Maj. Gen. George B. McClellan began organizing the Army of the Potomac in March, Sumner was given command of one of its new corps. McClellan had not originally formed corps within the Army; Sumner was selected as one of four corps commanders by President Lincoln, based on his seniority. The II Corps, commanded during the war by Sumner, Darius N. Couch, Winfield Scott Hancock, and Andrew A. Humphreys, had the deserved reputation of being one of the best in the Eastern Theater. Sumner, who was the oldest of the generals in the Army of the Potomac, led his corps throughout the Peninsula Campaign and the Seven Days Battles.

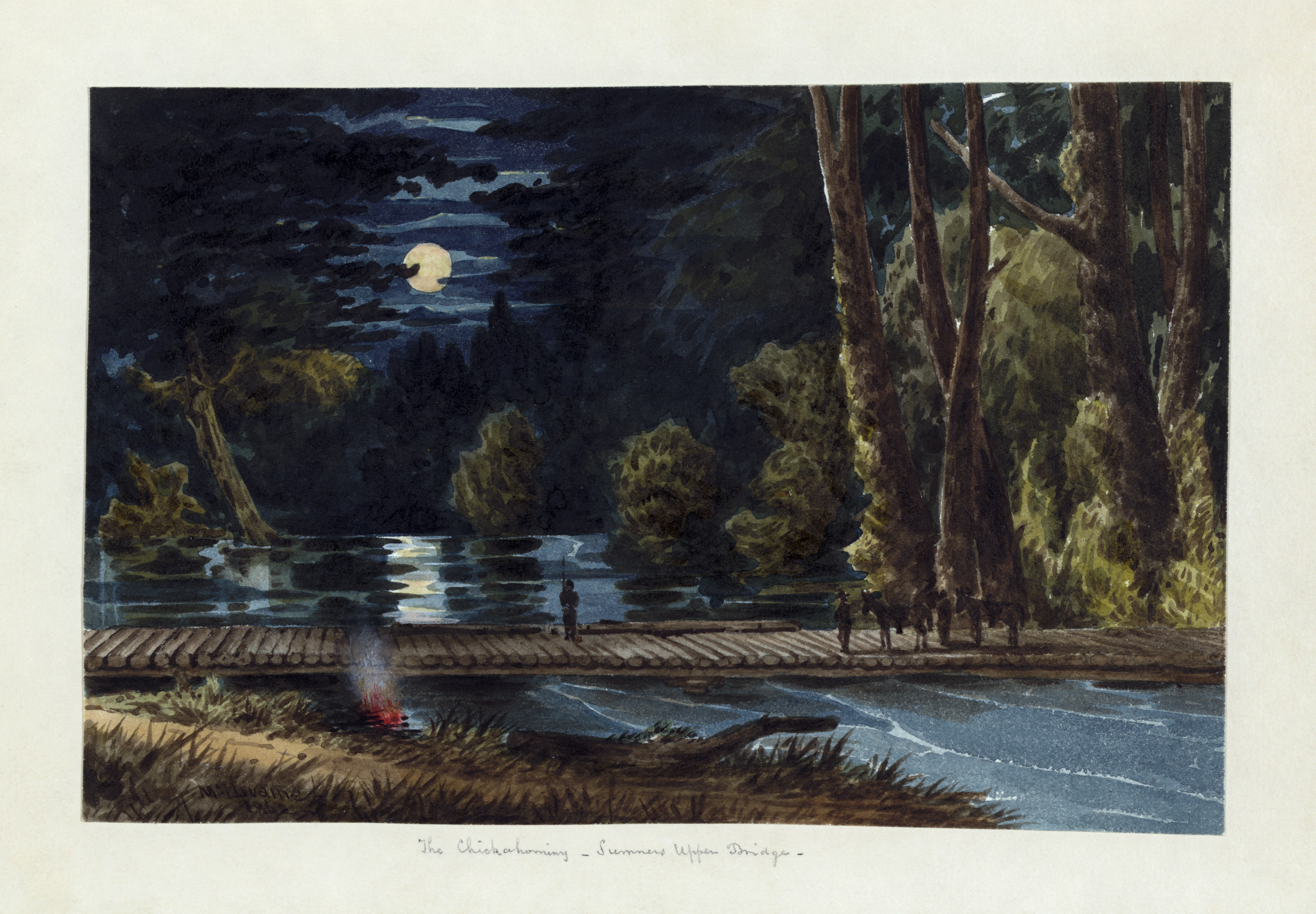
The Chickahominy – Sumner's Upper Bridge: 1862 watercolour by William McIlvaine

McClellan originally formed a poor opinion of Sumner during the Battle of Williamsburg on May 5, 1862. During McClellan's absence, Sumner directed the inconclusive battle, which failed to impede the Confederate withdrawal up the Peninsula, and McClellan wrote to his wife, "Sumner had proved that he was even a greater fool than I had supposed & had come within an ace of having us defeated." At the Battle of Seven Pines, however, Sumner's initiative in sending reinforcing troops across the dangerously rain-swollen Chickahominy River prevented a Union disaster. He received the brevet of major general in the regular army for his gallantry at Seven Pines. Sumner was struck in the arm and hand by spent balls at the Battle of Glendale. Despite his old-fashioned ideas on discipline and respect for commanding officers, the II Corps troops generally had a positive opinion of him. Sumner was promoted to major general of volunteers on July 4, 1862, with the rank dated to May 5.

In the fall of 1862, at the Battle of Antietam, Sumner was the center of controversy for ordering Brig. Gen. John Sedgwick's division to launch an attack into the West Woods on the morning of the battle. The assault was devastated by a Confederate counterattack, and Sedgwick's men retreated in great disorder to their starting point with over 2,200 casualties. Sumner has been condemned by most historians for his "reckless" attack, his lack of coordination with the other corps commanders, accompanying Sedgwick's division personally and losing control of his other attacking division, failing to perform adequate reconnaissance prior to launching his attack, and selecting an unusual line of battle formation that was so effectively flanked by the Confederate counterattack. Historian M. V. Armstrong's recent scholarship, however, has determined that Sumner did perform appropriate reconnaissance and his decision to attack where he did was justified by the information available to him.

Sumner's other divisions drove the weak Confederate center back, but Sumner was badly shaken by the disaster to Sedgwick and heavy casualties to other Union forces. Maj. Gen. William B. Franklin wanted to attack with his fresh VI Corps, but Sumner, who was senior to him, ordered him to hold back. McClellan sustained Sumner.

Shortly before being fired from command of the army in October, McClellan wrote to the War Department a letter recommending that Sumner be relieved of duty, as he doubted that his age and health would permit him to survive another campaign, but nothing came of this and when Maj. Gen. Ambrose Burnside succeeded to the command of the Army of the Potomac, he grouped the corps in "grand divisions" and appointed Sumner to command the Right Grand Division. In this capacity, he took part in the disastrous Battle of Fredericksburg, in which the II Corps, now commanded by Major General Darius N. Couch, suffered heavy casualties in frontal assaults against Confederate troops fortified at Marye's Heights.

=== Transfer and death ===
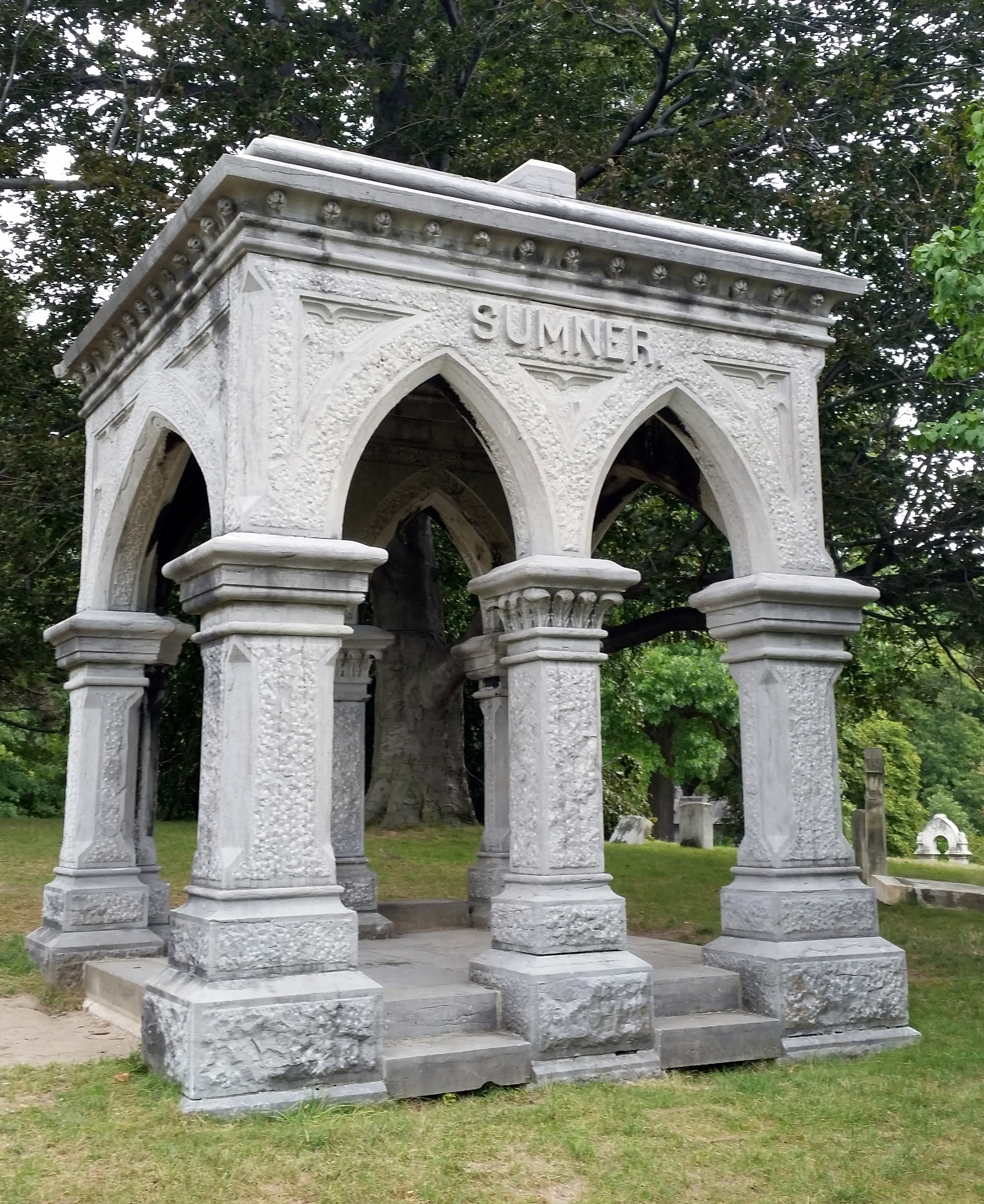
Memorial and burial place of Major Gen. E. V. Sumner and Hannah F. Sumner, Oakwood Cemetery, Syracuse, New York

Soon afterward, on Maj. Gen. Joseph Hooker's appointment to command the Army of the Potomac on January 26, 1863, Sumner was relieved of his command at his own request. He was then reassigned to a new command in the Department of the Missouri, effective in the spring. Before that, Sumner went to his daughter's home in Syracuse, New York, to rest, where he fell ill with fever. He died on March 21, 1863, and was buried in Syracuse's Oakwood Cemetery.

His two sons, Brigadier General Edwin Vose Sumner, Jr. and Major General Samuel S. Sumner, both served in the Civil War and the Spanish–American War.

== Grave ==
Sumner is buried in Section 8, Lot 1 of Oakwood Cemetery in Syracuse. Part of the Teall family plot, the gravesite has some structural problems and issues of disrepair. The Onondaga County Civil War Round Table was raising funds to repair the grave and the general area.

Fort Sumner in the New Mexico Territory was named in his honour.

== See also ==
- List of American Civil War generals (Union)

== Notes ==
Preceded by none	Commander of the II Corps; March 13, 1862 – October 7, 1862	Succeeded by Darius N. Couch
