= T. B. Sumner =

American politician

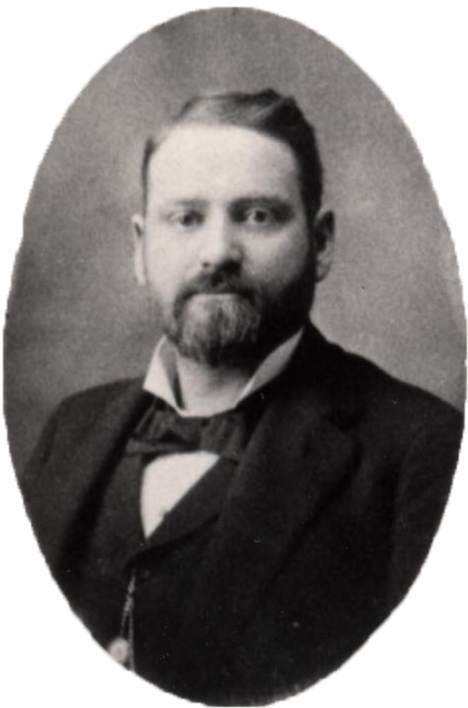
- Sumner in 1903

President pro tempore of the Washington Senate
- In office January 12, 1903 – January 9, 1905
- Preceded by: Joseph George Megler
- Succeeded by: George H. Baker

Member of the Washington State Senate
- In office January 12, 1903 – January 11, 1909
- Preceded by: Constituency established
- Succeeded by: Jacob Falconer
- Constituency: 38th
- In office January 14, 1901 – January 12, 1903
- Preceded by: John A. Davis
- Succeeded by: A. T. Van de Vanter
- Constituency: 31st

Personal details
- Born: March 25, 1857 Waupun, Wisconsin, U.S.
- Died: April 5, 1934 (aged 77) Everett, Washington, U.S.
- Party: Republican

Thomas B. Sumner (March 25, 1857 – April 5, 1934) was an American politician in the state of Washington. He served in the Washington State Senate from 1901 to 1909. From 1903 to 1905, he was President pro tempore of the Senate.
