= Swenholt =

Swenholt is a surname. Notable people with the surname include:

- Helmer Swenholt (1886–1952), American engineer
- Jonas Swenholt (1855–1923), American businessman and politician
