= 332nd Regiment =

332nd Regiment may refer to:

- 332nd Engineer General Service Regiment
- 332nd Infantry Regiment
