= Senator England =

Senator England may refer to:

- Edward T. England (1869–1934), West Virginia State Senate
- Jeremy England (politician) (born 1982), Mississippi State Senate

== See also ==
- John Englund (1873–1948), Wisconsin State Senate
