= Whitcomb, Wisconsin =

- Unincorporated community
- Location within Wisconsin Location within the United States
- Coordinates: 44°47′00″N 89°07′07″W
- Country: United States
- State: Wisconsin
- County: Shawano
- Elevation: 1,119 ft (341 m)
- Time zone: UTC-6 (Central (CST))
  - Summer (DST): UTC-5 (CDT)
- Area codes: 715 & 534
- GNIS feature ID: 1576619

Whitcomb is an unincorporated community located in the town of Wittenberg, Shawano County, Wisconsin, United States. Whitcomb is located on Wisconsin Highway 153 near its junction with U.S. Route 45, 4 miles (6.4 km) southeast of the village of Wittenberg.

== History ==
A post office called Whitcomb was established in 1881, and remained in operation until it was discontinued in 1922. The community was named for H. F. Whitcomb, a railroad official.
