= 102nd Field Artillery Regiment =

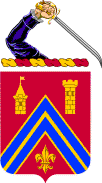
- Coat of arms
- Active: July 1786 – 15 July 2006
- Country: United States
- Branch: Massachusetts Army National Guard
- Garrison/HQ: Quincy, Massachusetts
- Equipment: M109A5 (last used)
- Engagements: World War I: Champagne-Marne; Aisne-Marne; St. Mihiel; Meuse-Argonne; Île-de-France; Lorraine; World War II: Northern France; Rhineland; Ardennes-Alsace; Central Europe; Operation Iraqi Freedom III: Battle of Abu Ghraib; Operation Great Lakes

Commanders
- Notable commanders: Ernest R. Redmond

Insignia
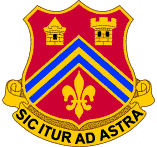
- Distinctive unit insignia

The 102nd Field Artillery Regiment is an inactive Field Artillery Regiment in the Massachusetts Army National Guard. Originally organized in 1786, the 102nd Field Artillery's predecessor units served in the Civil War, the Spanish–American War, and World War I. Units of the regiment served with the 26th Infantry Division during World War II and the Cold War.

== History ==
The 102nd Field Artillery was organized in July 1786 in the Massachusetts Volunteer Militia at Salem, Massachusetts, as the Cadet Company and re-designated as the Second Corps of Cadets. In 1972 they became the 102nd Field Artillery and in 1996 the 102nd was reorganized as a regiment to consist of the 1st Battalion. The regiment's battalions were associated with the 26th Infantry Division for a long period and later was assigned to the 113th Field Artillery Brigade. On 15 July 2006, the 102d cased their colors in Fort Independence at Castle Island in South Boston, Massachusetts. The lineage of the 102d Field Artillery and the Second Corps of Cadets was transferred to Charlie Battery, 1st Battalion 101st Field Artillery in Danvers, Massachusetts.

== Lineage and honors ==
=== Lineage ===
- Organized 10 July 1786 in the Massachusetts Volunteer Militia at Salem as the Cadet Company and assigned to the 1st Brigade, 2d Division.
- Redesignated in 1828 as the Salem Independent Cadets (designation varied slightly during the period 1786–1862). While remaining in state service the Salem Independent Cadets additionally formed Company D, 14th Massachusetts Volunteer Infantry Regiment (mustered into Federal service 5 July 1861 at Fort Warren, Massachusetts; converted and redesignated 1 January 1862 as Company D, 1st Massachusetts Heavy Artillery Regiment; mustered out of Federal service 16 August 1865 at Washington, D.C.). Salem Independent Cadets mustered into Federal service 26 May 1862 at Fort Warren, Massachusetts, as the Salem Cadets; mustered out of Federal service 11 October 1862 at Fort Warren, Massachusetts.
- Redesignated in 1866 as the Second Company of Cadets.
- Expanded in 1874 to form a battalion and redesignated as the Second Corps of Cadets. (Massachusetts Volunteer Militia redesignated 15 November 1907 as the Massachusetts National Guard.)
- Converted and redesignated 24 December 1915 as the 2d Battalion, Field Artillery (Second Corps of Cadets).
- Redesignated 26 February 1916 as the 2d Battalion, 1st Regiment of Field Artillery.
- Mustered into Federal service 18 June 1916 at Framingham
- Mustered out of Federal service 14 November 1916 at Framingham.
- Drafted into Federal service 5 August 1917.
- Reorganized and redesignated 22 August 1917 as the 2d Battalion, 101st Field Artillery, an element of the 26th Division.
- Demobilized 29 April 1919 at Camp Devens, Massachusetts.
- Reorganized and redesignated 31 March 1920 in the Massachusetts National Guard as the 2d Battalion, 102d Field Artillery.
- Redesignated 1 September 1920 as the 2d Battalion, 2d Field Artillery.
- Redesignated 30 September 1921 as the 2d Battalion, 102d Field Artillery, an element of the 26th Division.
- Inducted into Federal service 16 January 1941 at Salem.
- Reorganized and redesignated 12 February 1942 as the 102d Field Artillery Battalion, an element of the 26th Infantry Division.
- Inactivated 25 December 1945 at Camp Patrick Henry, Virginia.
- Reorganized and Federally recognized 12 December 1946 at Salem.
- Reorganized and redesignated 1 May 1959 as the 102d Artillery, a parent regiment under the Combat Arms Regimental System, to consist of the 1st, 2d, and 3d Howitzer Battalions, elements of the 26th Infantry Division.
- Redesignated 1 March 1972 as the 102d Field Artillery.
- Reorganized 1 April 1975 to consist of the 1st Battalion, an element of the 26th Infantry Division.
- Reorganized 1 September 1978 to consist of the 1st Battalion and Battery E, elements of the 26th Infantry Division.
- Withdrawn 1 March 1988 from the Combat Arms Regimental System; concurrently consolidated with the 101st Field Artillery (organized in 1636) and consolidated unit reorganized under the United States Army Regimental System as the 101st Field Artillery, to consist of the 1st Battalion.
- Consolidated 1 September 1993 with the 211th Field Artillery (organized in 1840) and consolidated unit designated as the 101st Field Artillery, to consist of the 1st Battalion and Battery E, elements of the 42d Infantry Division.
- Former 102d Field Artillery withdrawn 1 October 1996 and reorganized as a parent regiment under the United States Army Regimental System, to consist of the 1st Battalion (101st Field Artillery—hereafter separate lineage).

=== Campaign participation credit ===
- Civil War: Spotsylvania; Cold Harbor; Petersburg; Appomattox; Virginia 1861; Virginia 1862; Virginia 1863
- World War I: Champagne-Marne; Aisne-Marne; St. Mihiel; Meuse-Argonne; Ile de France 1918; Lorraine 1918
- World War II: Northern France; Rhineland; Ardennes-Alsace; Central Europe

Battery B (Methuen), 1st Battalion, additionally entitles to:
- War with Spain: Puerto Rico
- World War II–AP: Guadalcanal; Northern Solomons; Leyte; Southern Philippines (with arrowhead)

=== Decorations ===
- Cited in the Order of the Day of the Belgian Army for action in the Ardennes (102d Field Artillery Battalion cited; DA GO 43, 1950)

Battery B (Methuen), 1st Battalion, additionally entitled to:
- Presidential Unit Citation (Army), Streamer embroidered GUADALCANAL (182d Infantry [less Band and 3d Battalion] cited; DA GO 73, 1948)
- Philippine Presidential Unit Citation, Streamer embroidered 17 OCTOBER 1944 TO 4 JULY 1945 (182d Infantry cited; DA GO 47, 1950)

== See also ==
- Hudson Armory
