= Ernest R. Redmond =

United States Army officer (1883 - 1966)

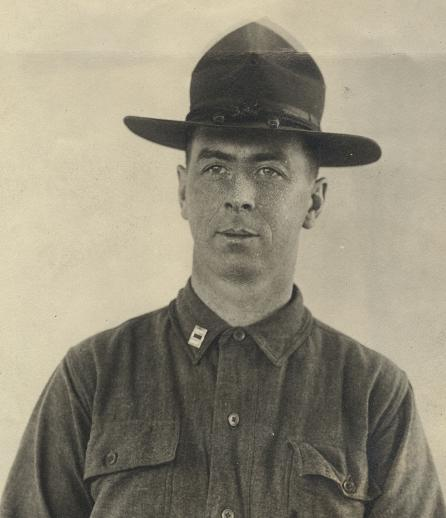
- Redmond as Captain commanding Battery E, 101st Field Artillery in World War I
- Born: July 10, 1883; Salem, Massachusetts, US
- Died: February 12, 1966 (aged 82); San Francisco, California, US
- Burial place: Golden Gate National Cemetery
- Military career
- Allegiance: United States
- Branch: United States Army
- Service years: 1904-1946
- Rank: Colonel
- Units: Massachusetts Army National Guard; National Guard Bureau
- Commands: 102nd Field Artillery Regiment; Chief of the National Guard Bureau
- Conflicts: Pancho Villa Expedition; World War I World War II
- Other work: Real estate broker

Ernest R. Redmond (July 10, 1883—February 12, 1966) was a United States Army officer who served as acting Chief of the National Guard Bureau.

== Early life ==
Ernest Rothemel Redmond was born in Salem, Massachusetts on July 10, 1883. He was educated in Salem and became a real estate agent.

Redmond enlisted in the Massachusetts National Guard in 1904, and advanced through the noncommissioned officer ranks to sergeant major before receiving his commission as a second lieutenant in 1910. A Field Artillery officer, Redmond was promoted to first lieutenant in 1911 and captain in 1913. In 1914 Redmond was one of 1,700 National Guard members activated to take part in fighting the Great Salem Fire of 1914. In 1916 he served on the Mexican border during the Pancho Villa Expedition.

== World War I ==
At the start of World War I Redmond was commander of Battery E, 101st Field Artillery. During the war he served in France, and was promoted to major and commander of a battalion in the 101st Field Artillery. He returned to Massachusetts in 1919.

== Post World War I ==
Redmond resumed working in real estate after the war. He also continued his National Guard career, receiving promotion to lieutenant colonel in 1920. In 1921 was advanced to colonel and commander of the 102nd Field Artillery Regiment.

A Republican, in 1925 Redmond was an unsuccessful candidate for Mayor of Salem.

== National Guard Bureau ==
In 1926 Redmond went on active duty as Assistant to the Chief of the Militia Bureau. He served as Acting Chief from June to September, 1929, following the retirement of Creed C. Hammond.

== Later career ==
During World War II Redmond served at the War Department in the office of the Chief of Engineers.

Redmond later relocated to California and resumed work as a real estate broker.

== Death and burial ==
Redmond died in San Francisco, California on February 12, 1966.

Military offices
| Preceded by Creed C. Hammond | Chief of the National Guard Bureau; 1929 –- 1929 | Succeeded by William G. Everson |
