= William G. Everson =

United States Army general (1879–1954)

William Graham Everson
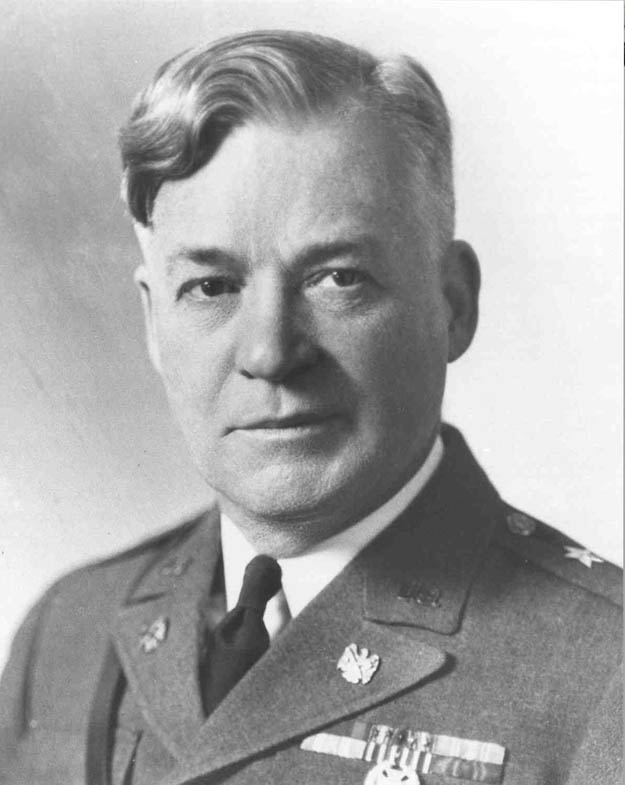
- General Everson as National Guard Bureau Chief
- Born: July 1, 1879; Wooster, Ohio, US
- Died: September 13, 1954 (aged 75); Portland, Oregon, US
- Burial place: Riverview Abbey, Portland Oregon
- Military career
- Allegiance: United States
- Branch: United States Army
- Service years: 1898–1945
- Rank: Major General
- Units: Indiana Army National Guard; National Guard Bureau
- Commands: 332nd Infantry Regiment; 76th Infantry Brigade; Indiana Army National Guard; Chief of the National Guard Bureau
- Conflicts: Spanish–American War; World War I: Italian campaign
- Other work: Baptist clergyman Public speaker College president

William Graham Everson (July 1, 1879 – September 13, 1954) was a major general in the United States Army who served as Chief of the National Guard Bureau.

== Early life ==
William Graham Everson was born in Wooster, Ohio on July 1, 1879. He was raised in Indiana, and joined the Army for the Spanish–American War, enlisting in Company E, 158th Indiana Infantry, and rising through the ranks to first sergeant.

== Subsequent career ==
Everson received his ordination as a Baptist minister in 1901, and was the pastor of churches in Boston, Indianapolis, Louisville, Cincinnati and Muncie. He also became a well known public speaker as a lecturer on the Chautauqua Circuit.

In 1903 Everson graduated from Franklin College, and in 1905 he was commissioned in the Indiana National Guard as a first lieutenant in the Chaplain Corps. In 1908 Everson graduated from Newton Theological Seminary. He was promoted to captain in the 3rd Indiana Infantry in 1909, major in 1914 and lieutenant colonel in 1918.

== World War I ==
Everson was promoted to colonel and commander of the 332nd Infantry Regiment, a unit of the 83rd Infantry Division. The 332nd served in Italy, and were the only American troops to serve east of the Adriatic Sea, carrying out operations in Austria, Dalmatia, Serbia, and Montenegro.

The awards and decorations Everson received for his World War I service included: War Merit Cross (Italy); Italian Sanctus Georgius (Saint George), Silver (for valor); Fatiche di Guerra (Italy) (for soldiers who served in the war zone for one year or more); Duca D'Aosta Medal (Italy) (for soldiers who served in or with the Italian Third Army); and the Star and Crown of Fiume (for defense of the Free State of Fiume).

== Post World War I ==
Everson continued his military service after the war. In 1922 he was promoted to brigadier general as commander of the 76th Infantry Brigade. Everson subsequently served as Adjutant General of Indiana.

Everson served as pastor of First Baptist Church in Muncie, Indiana from 1921 until 1929.

He graduated from the United States Army War College in 1923 and the United States Army Command and General Staff College in 1928.

== National Guard Bureau ==
In 1929 Everson was promoted to major general and appointed as Chief of the Militia Bureau. He served in this position until 1931, when he resigned in order to return to the ministry, accepting a position with the First Baptist Church in Denver.

== Later career ==
In 1931 Everson received an honorary Doctor of Divinity degree from Franklin College. From 1939 to 1943 he served as President of Linfield College.

Everson Street on the campus of Linfield U in McMinnville, Oregon, is named for William G. Everson, a former Linfield College president. Source: Linfield U Campus Map https://www.linfield.edu/assets/files/admission/mcminnville-campus-map.pdf Source: Wildcatville blog https://wildcatville.blogspot.com/2024/03/everson-street-on-campus-of-linfield-u.html

During World War II, he was chairman of the Oregon Enemy Alien Hearing Board, which conducted hearings for non-citizen Japanese residents of Oregon who were detained as possible security risks and made determinations as to whether their detainments should continue. Everson continued to serve in the military until reaching mandatory retirement age in 1945.

== Retirement and death ==
In retirement Everson resided in Portland, Oregon, where he died on September 13, 1954. He is buried at Riverview Abbey in Portland.

Military offices
Preceded by Ernest R. Redmond (acting)	Chief of the National Guard Bureau; 1929–1931	Succeeded by George E. Leach
