= Nueske's Applewood Smoked Meats =

Specialty meat supplier in Wisconsin

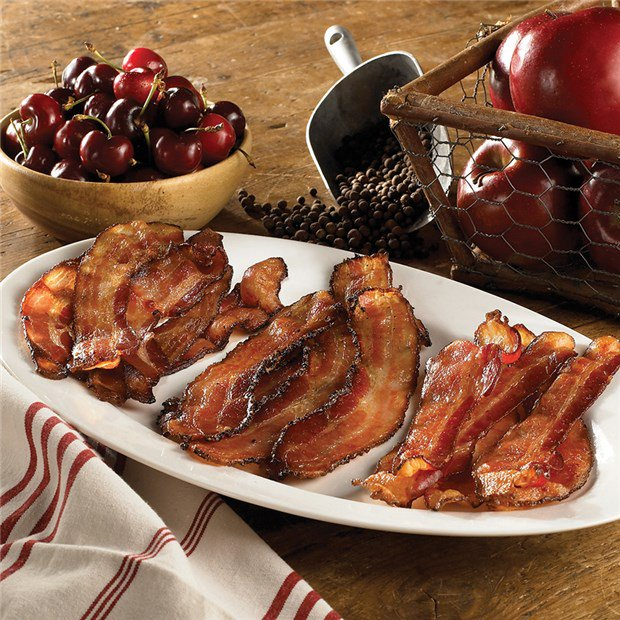
Nueske's Gourmet Smoked Bacon

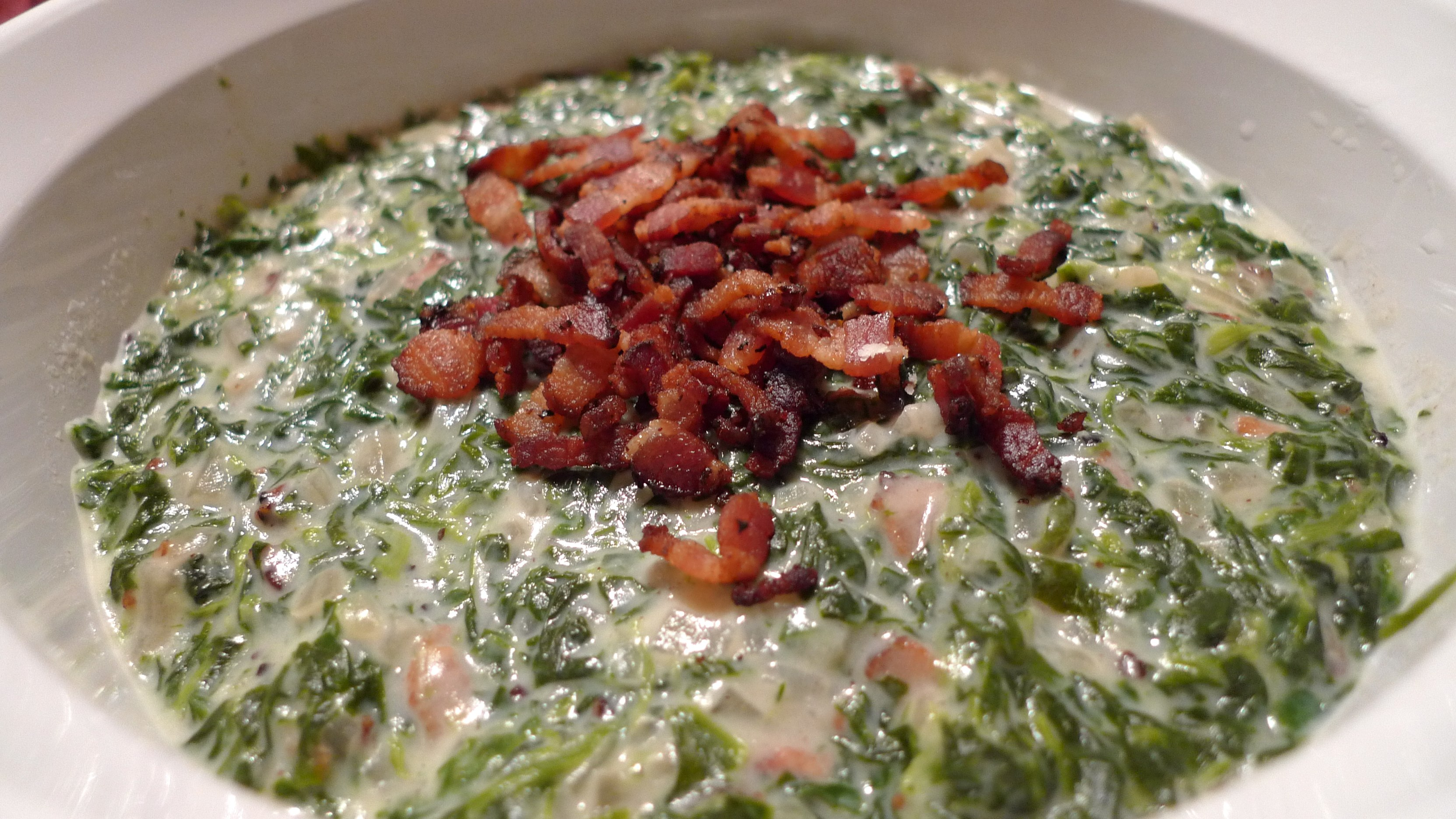
Nueske's Bacon on creamed spinach

Nueske's Applewood Smoked Meats is a specialty meat supplier in Wittenberg, Wisconsin, United States. The company produces artisan applewood smoked bacon, ham, sausage and poultry.

== History ==
Nueske's was founded in the Great Depression when R.C. Nueske began selling meats using family recipes. Nueske started marketing bacon, sausages, hams and smoked turkeys from a panel truck at small resorts in northern Wisconsin. By 2022 the company offered 30 products including glazed spiral-sliced hams, smoked turkeys, mettwurst, smoked pork chops, and beef 'n' bacon burgers, while its core bacon products continued to outsell all other products combined by about two to one. As of 2000 the company was operated by two Nueske brothers, Robert D. and James A. Jim Nueske helped expand distribution nationally, and international sales in Russia and Eastern Europe have been initiated.

== Operation ==
Nueske's prepares its meats with a 20- to 24-hour smoking in "16 steel-lined concrete-block smokehouses heated by open fires of applewood logs" Racks hold 80 sides at a time for about 16,000 pounds a day, with the smoked meat emerging "lean and cordovan-colored, ready to be hand-trimmed and then machine-sliced, roughly 18 one-eighth-inch slices to a pound."

Nueske's headquarters is located 65 miles (105 km) west of Green Bay. The company markets its products via both mail order and retail supermarkets.

The company spent $7.5 million on a 2006 construction project that included a 25,000-square-foot (2,300 m^{2}) plant expansion. Funding assistance included a $219,000 Transportation Economic Assistance from the state Department of Transportation that helped cover construction costs for two access roads near Nueske's. The expansion was expected to create and retain 148 jobs and more than $4 million in annual wages.

== Reviews ==
The New York Times said Nueske's produced the "beluga of bacon, the Rolls-Royce of rashers" and as being well suited to BLTs, accompaniment of eggs, and as an "ideal counterpoint to the richness of calf's liver or shad roe."

Nueske's is a three-time winner of the gold Specialty Outstanding Food Innovation (sofi) award from the National Association for the Specialty Food Trade, and its bacon has been used by high-end restaurants across the United States.

== See also ==
- List of smoked foods
