= 162nd Infantry Regiment (United States) =

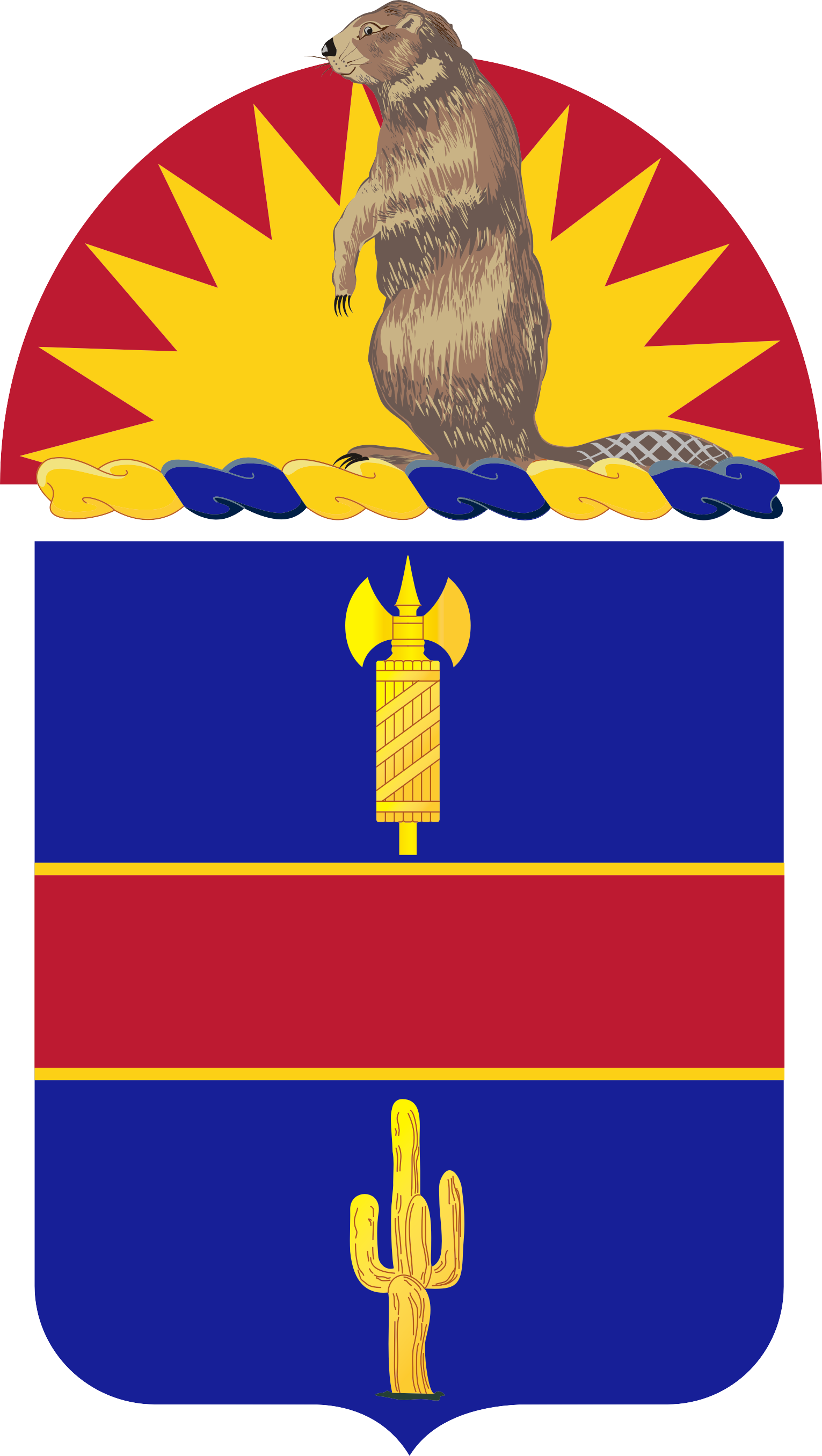
- Coat of arms
- Active: 1917 -
- Country: United States
- Branch: Oregon Army National Guard
- Nicknames: The Volunteers, Third Oregon Infantry
- Engagements: World War I World War II; Iraq Campaign; Afghanistan Campaign

Commanders
- Current commander: LTC Richard Nicolas
- Notable commanders: Creed C. Hammond; Ross MacKechnie

Insignia
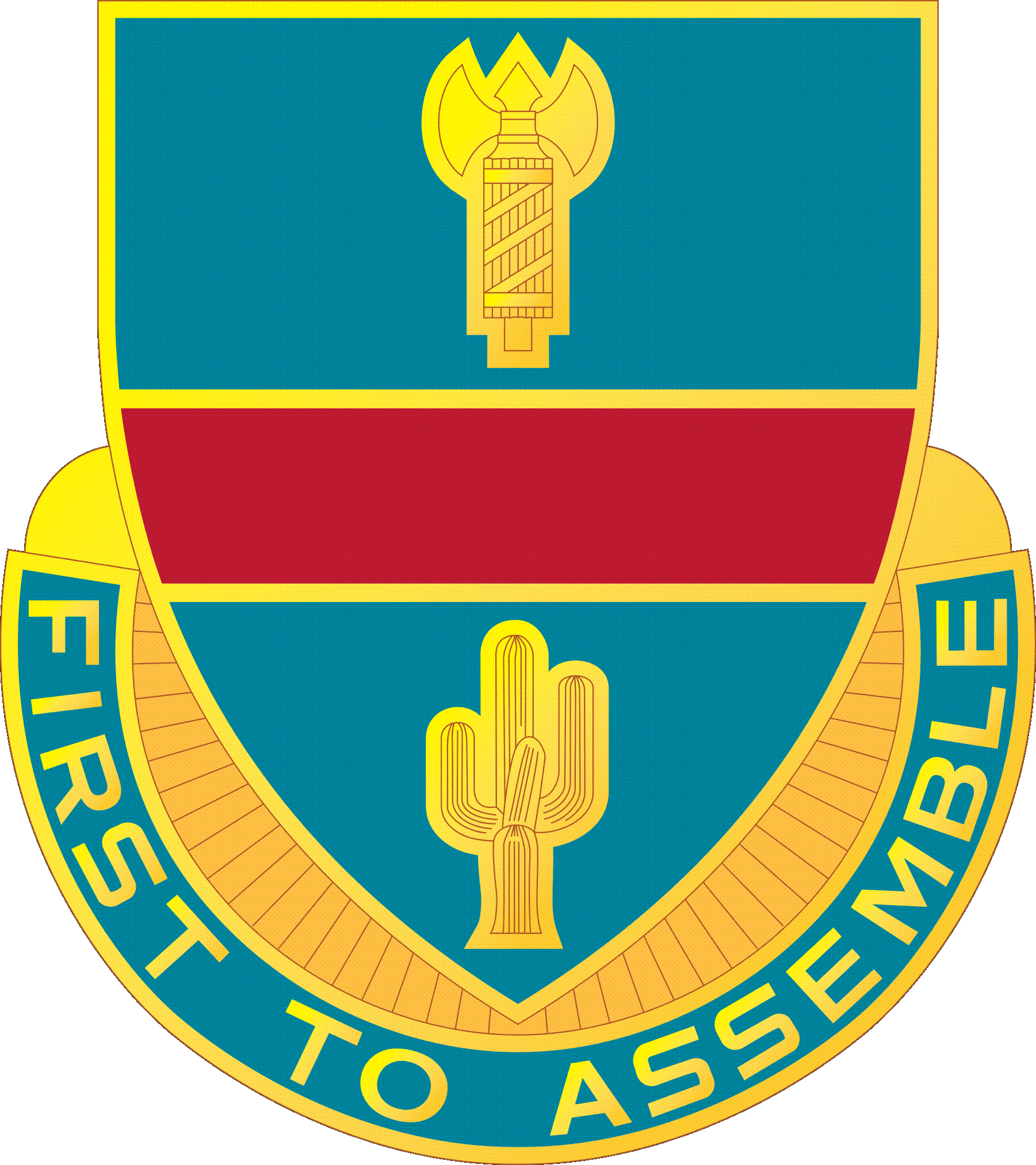
- Distinctive unit insignia

The 162nd Infantry Regiment is a regiment of the Oregon Army National Guard with headquarters in Springfield, Oregon. In January 2006 as part of the Army's transformation towards a modular force, the 1st Battalion, 162nd Infantry Regiment was inactivated. Many members continued to serve with the 2nd Battalion and other units within the 41st Infantry Brigade Combat Team.

== Origins and World War I ==
The 162nd Infantry Regiment traces its lineage back to 20 May 1887, when the Infantry Brigade of the Oregon National Guard was organized from existing state militia companies. The brigade included the 1st, 2nd, and 3rd Infantry Regiments. Companies G and K of the 2nd Regiment were detached and reorganized as the Separate Battalion, Infantry in 1893, but the battalion was discontinued in 1896 and the two companies became separate units within the brigade. The 3rd Regiment was reduced to the 3rd Battalion, Infantry in March 1896. During the Spanish–American War, the Infantry Brigade was mustered into Federal service as the 2nd Oregon Volunteer Infantry Regiment at Portland between 7 and 15 May 1898. After service in the Philippine–American War, the regiment mustered out at San Francisco on 7 August 1899. The Portland elements of the brigade were reorganized as the 3rd Regiment of Infantry on 3 May 1900.

The 3rd Oregon was mustered into Federal service for duty on the Mexican border on 19 June 1916 at Portland. Returning from southern California, they mustered out at Camp Clackamas on 25 September 1916. For World War I, the regiment was called into Federal service on 25 March 1917 and drafted into Federal service on 5 August. The 3rd Oregon was consolidated with the Companies E, F, G, and H of the 2nd Battalion of the 3rd Infantry Regiment from the District of Columbia National Guard to become the 162nd Infantry Regiment on 2 October 1917. It served with the 41st Division, whose soldiers were used as individual replacements for other divisions.

== Interwar period ==
What was left of the regiment arrived at the port of New York on 17 February 1919 aboard the SS Canopec. After the end of World War I, the regiment was demobilized at Camp Dix on 1 March 1919, several days after the division.

The Oregon elements of the 162nd Infantry were reorganized on 30 June 1919 as the 3rd Infantry Regiment, Oregon National Guard. The regiment was renumbered as the 5th Infantry Regiment on 5 May 1920. Restoring its Federal designation, the regiment was redesignated as the 162nd Infantry Regiment on 7 October 1921 and became part of the 41st Infantry Division. Between the wars, the regiment conducted annual summer training at Camp Lewis between 1922 and 1924, Camp Jackson in 1925 and 1926, and Camp Clatsop from 1927 to 1939.

== World War II ==
For World War II, the 162nd Infantry was inducted into Federal service at Portland on 16 September 1940. After the end of the war, the regiment inactivated at Kure on 31 December 1945.

From 1943 until his wounding in early 1944 in New Guinea, the 2nd Battalion of the 162d was commanded by Lieutenant Colonel Archibald Roosevelt, the son of the 26th US president, Theodore Roosevelt.

=== Zamboanga ===
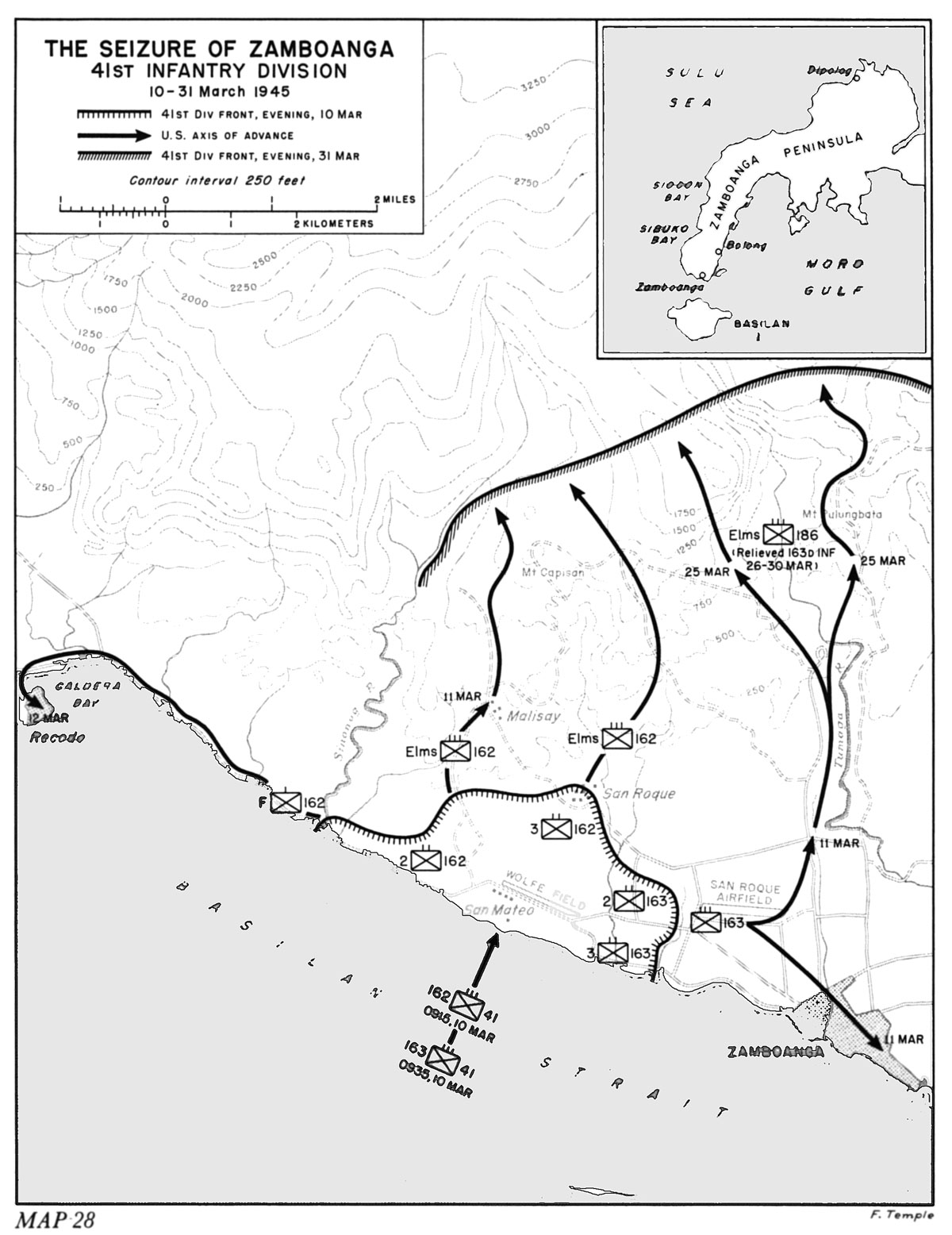
Zamboanga Peninsula operations until 31 March

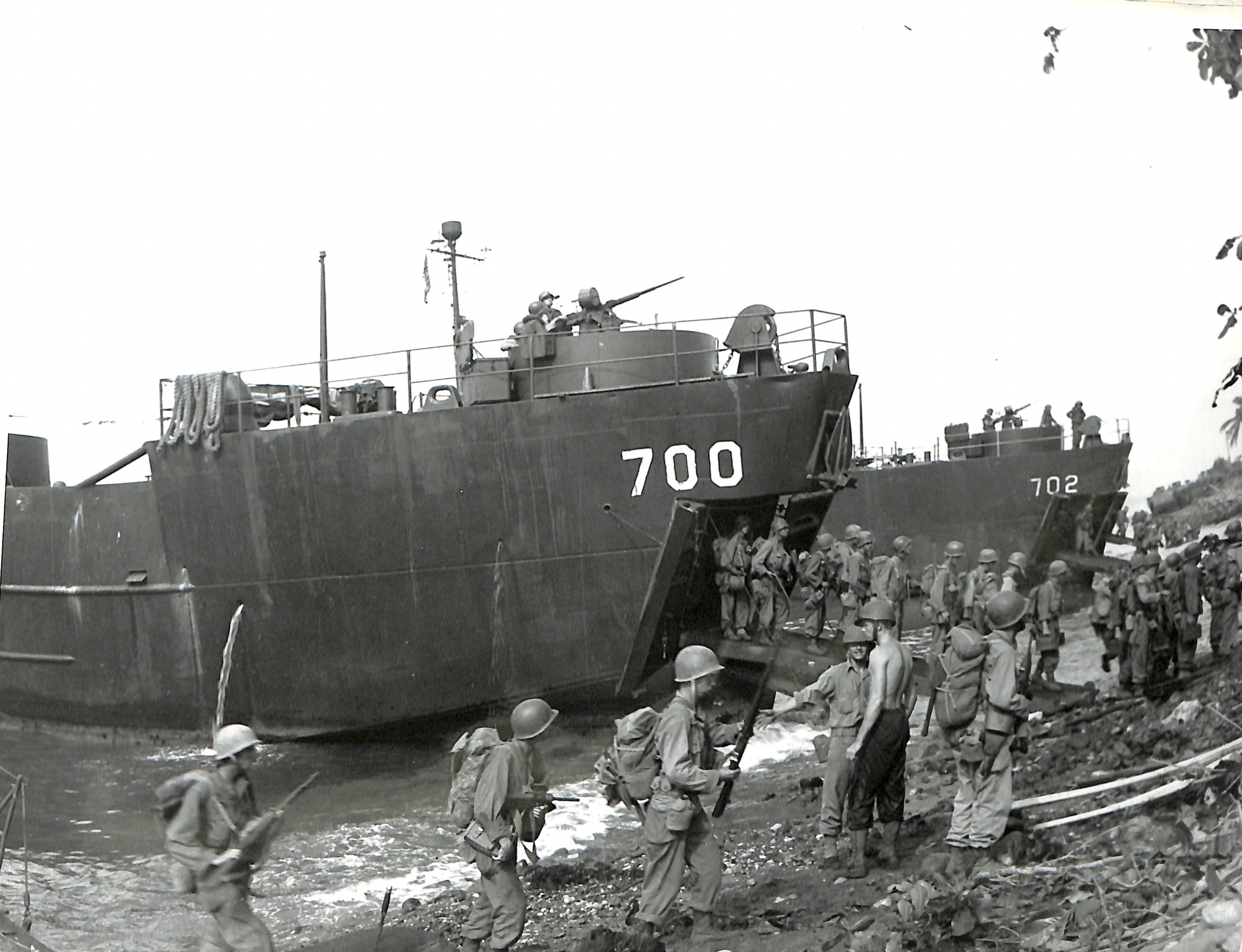
Troops of the regiment landing on Zamboanga

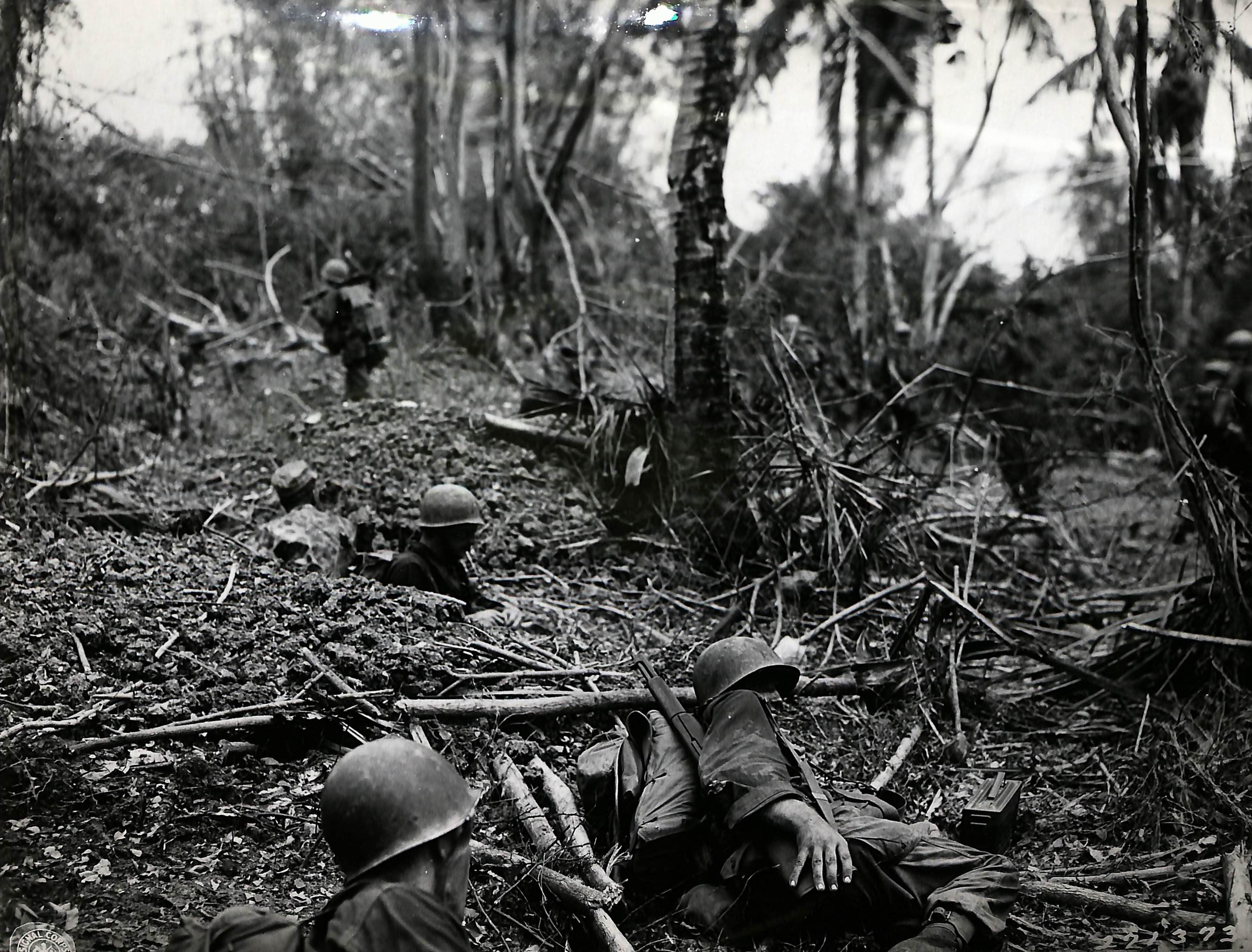
Infantrymen of the regiment taking cover from mortar and artillery fire while waiting to move up, 100 yards from Wolfe Field on 10 March

After leaving Biak, the 162nd and the division staged at Mindoro in preparation for the liberation of the Southern Philippines. The 186th Regimental Combat Team landed on Palawan on 28 February in order to secure airfields there from which the Japanese lines of communication in the South China Sea could be blockaded. To capture airfields even closer to the Dutch East Indies and the strategic oilfields of Borneo, planners selected the southern tip of the Zamboanga Peninsula on Mindanao as the next target. The rest of the 41st Infantry Division was committed to this operation, and entered Basilan Strait early on 10 March. The invasion beaches had been targeted by three days of naval bombardments which had disabled some of the Japanese artillery inland. For the Mindanao operations, the 205th Field Artillery Battalion was organic to the 162nd RCT to provide direct support. The 162nd Infantry was tasked with assaulting the beach near the barrio of San Mateo, but faced very little resistance from the Japanese. The leading assault wave, touching down around 0915, was faced with light machine gun fire and subsequent troops encountered artillery and mortar fire from the high ground inland, but the regiment suffered no casualties. The 162nd secured the abandoned landing strip of Wolfe Field half a mile inland and spread out in an advance in all three directions outwards from the beachhead. The 163rd Infantry followed within twenty minutes and within several hours had begun advancing directly east on Zamboanga City. Before halting at nightfall, the 162nd advanced 1.5 miles inland and the same distance to the west along the southern coast of the peninsula. By dusk on 11 March, both regiments secured the coastal plain, as the Japanese 54th Independent Mixed Brigade and the rest of the nearly 9,000 Japanese troops on the peninsula had withdrawn to defensive positions on the high ground 2–3 miles inland, from which they could observe the American troops on the beachhead. To the northwest, the advance of the 162nd reached the former Japanese seaplane base of Caldera Bay, while on the inland axis the regiment advanced two miles inland to Malisay and to San Roque a mile and a half southeast of Malisay. The 163rd secured the rubble of Zamboanga City, destroyed in preinvasion bombardment, and captured San Roque Airfield, which was quickly repaired to serve as an airstrip.

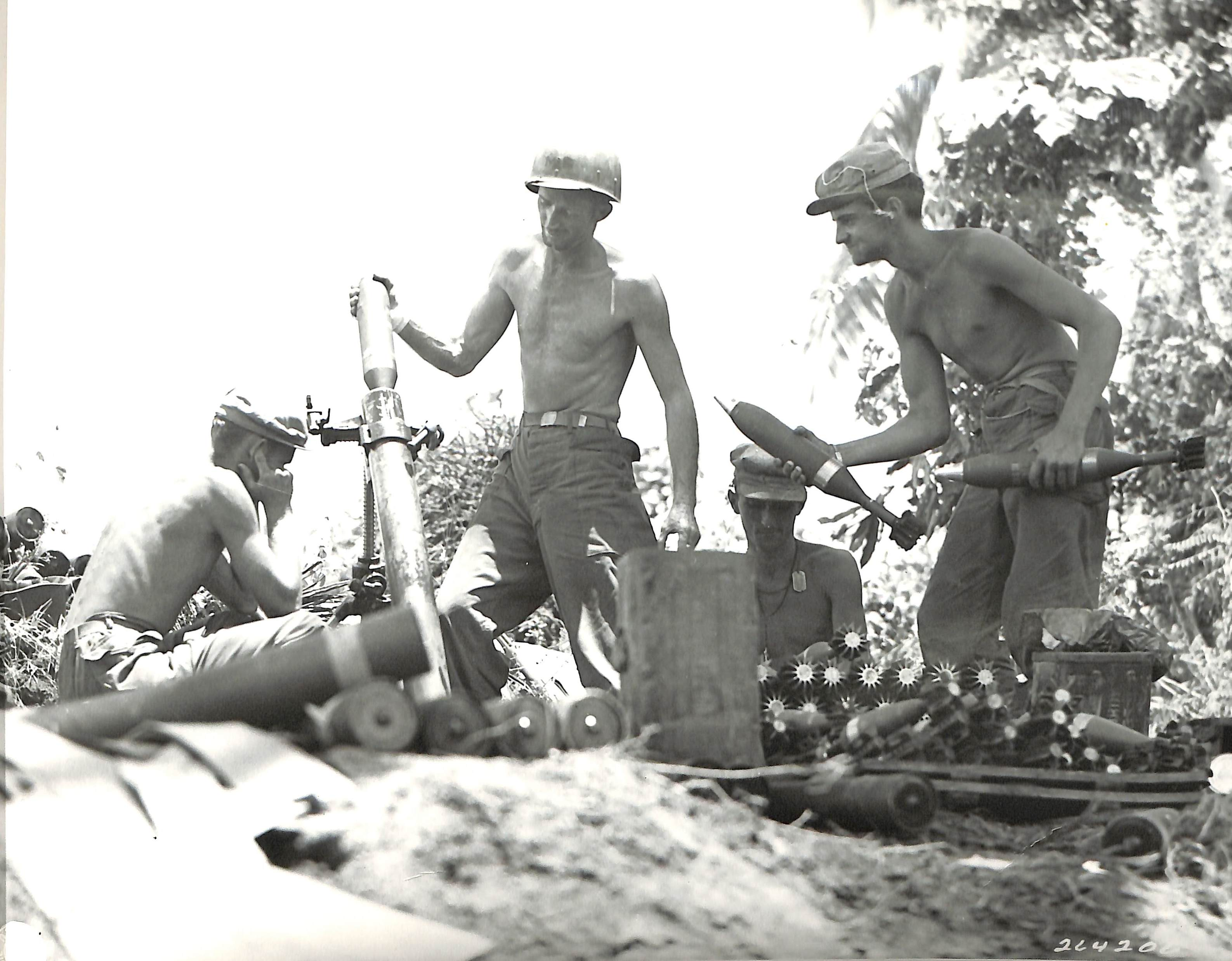
An 81 mm mortar crew supporting the advance of the regiment, 24 March

The 41st then needed to secure the high ground that dominated the San Roque airfield from its Japanese defenders. While the 163rd advanced north from Zamboanga City, the 162nd used two columns with the right flank attacking north from San Roque and the left north from Malisay, with both columns converging on Mount Capisan, 1.5 miles north of Malisay. The advance was slowed by the prepared Japanese defenses that were three miles deep at their strongest, guarded by barbed wire, booby traps, and minefields, and Japanese harassing counterattacks at night. In addition, the difficult terrain that turned into mountainous rain forests to the north further hampered operations as only poor trails existed in the sector of the Japanese defenses, forcing the division to slow its advance so that bulldozers could construct roads for supply and evacuation. However, tanks could not operate off these roads once the advanced reached the foothills of the peninsula. Backed by continuous artillery and close air support, the 162nd and 163rd methodically advanced northwards, causing the Japanese defenses to disintegrate on 20 March. The two regiments split the defenders between the Mount Pulungbata and Mount Capisan sectors by 23 March and two days later the 162nd overran the last organized resistance near Mount Capisan. This forced the remnants of the central Japanese sector to retreat to the north, while the 163rd took care of the eastern sector. After Mount Capisan was stormed, the regiment was relieved at the end of March and beginning of April, and encamped near Zamboanga. Total division losses during the operations on Zamboanga were 220 killed and 665 wounded.

While the rest of the regiment was still on Zamboanga, a reinforced company from the 162nd landed unopposed on Basilan island on 18 March and swept it and the surrounding islets of Japanese presence, finding none. Company L of the 162nd sent its intelligence and reconnaissance platoon on 26 April to clear the small Sibago island northeast of Basilan of its Japanese defenders, beginning the regiment's last combat action in the Zamboanga sector. Sibago was the site of the lighthouse guiding traffic in Basilan Strait, and its garrison was reported at less than a platoon strength. The platoon landed unopposed after a bombing raid and PT boat strafing, but lost one wounded and fell back to nearby Lanhil island when it came under fire from a hidden Japanese position. The platoon was reinforced by a strengthened rifle platoon from Company L and two guns of Cannon Company; the American force returned to the island on the next day. Advancing on the lighthouse through jungle, the rifle platoon lost one killed and one wounded to the well-hidden defenders while reporting two Japanese killed. The scouts of the I&R platoon found the lighthouse otherwise inaccessible without climbing equipment and the Company L units returned to the beach to dig in. Another reinforced rifle platoon from Company L was dispatched on 28 April, but renewed attacks that day and the next were similarly unsuccessful with the loss of another wounded. It was not until 30 April that the American force was finally able to defeat the Japanese garrison, recording 58 Japanese dead. It had taken five days for three platoons and two guns with dive bomber and PT boat support to take control of the small island at a cost of one killed and two wounded.

=== Eastern Mindanao ===
In the first week of May, the 162nd, having accomplished its objectives at Zamboanga was transferred to eastern Mindanao to secure lines of communication. The 24th and 31st Infantry Divisions needed to concentrate their own forces for the main attack against the Japanese rather than being spread out along lines of communication. As a result, Eichelberger transferred the 162nd Regimental Combat Team to X Corps, freeing up the 24th's 21st Infantry Regiment for the attack. One battalion combat team from the 162nd landed at Digos to guard the rear of the 24th Infantry Division, while the remainder went to the 31st's sector to secure the region from the coast of Illana Bay inland to Kabacan. In the latter, the regiment took over responsibility for the security of the X Corps rear area from Parang to Fort Pikit, allowing the 155th Regimental Combat Team of the 31st to join in the advance up the Sayre Highway. Between 13 and 26 June, elements of the 162nd advanced twenty miles east into the mountains from Maramag to outflank the Japanese 30th Division at Silae.

Meanwhile, attached to the 24th Infantry Division, the 162nd, having detached the 2nd Battalion and gained the 3rd Battalion, 163rd Infantry, participated in the advance on Calinan along the Kibawe-Talomo trail from 10 June, pursuing the Japanese 100th Division. The 162nd RCT, including the 3rd Battalion of the 163rd, suffered 25 killed and 85 wounded for a total of 110 casualties during the campaign in eastern Mindanao.

The 162nd RCT assisted in mopping up Japanese resistance until 4 July, when they left Davao to rejoin the rest of the division at Zamboanga. Finally out of the "steaming, malarial jungles," the regiment settled down to what the division history described as a "life of comparative ease and luxury." By this point, the Pacific Northwest National Guard character of the division was mostly diluted by replacements from across the country, casualties and the departure home of veteran servicemen: only 12 percent of the officers were Guardsmen, compared to 70% in 1940. Based on the newly introduced point system, all remaining original members of the division had more than enough points to qualify for discharge. At Zamboanga, the division began training for the amphibious landing that was planned to begin the invasion of Japan, before news came in of the Japanese surrender on 15 August.

=== Occupation of Japan ===
The division was transferred to X Corps and slated for the occupation of the Kure and Hiroshima area on western Honshu, announced by MacArthur in a press conference on 10 September. The training program was accordingly modified to familiarize the soldiers of the division in Japanese customs and language, and combat units received training on military police duties. The 41st was ordered to conduct a "peaceful invasion" but to remain weary of Japanese treachery. The division embarked aboard transports at Zamboanga by 19 September and arrived in Japan in early October. The 162nd garrisoned the submarine base near the Kure Naval Arsenal, finding that the barracks were "partially roofless and completely flea-ridden." While the barracks were being made habitable and cleansed with DDT to kill fleas, many of the men lived in tents.

After three weeks at Kure, the regiment was sent to Onomichi, Fukuyama (and Matsue on 28 October to dispose of Japanese war materiel and conduct occupation duties. Company B of the 116th Engineers, the 181st Bomb Disposal Squad, and the 58th Chemical General Service Company were attached to the 162nd to handle war materiel, and the regiment completed the relocation by 5 November with Cannon Company taking over military police duties. Regimental headquarters was established at Onomishi with the 1st Battalion at Matsue and 3rd Battalion at Fukuyama. The 58th Chemical Company was tasked with disposing of Japanese gas supplies, while the rest of the regiment destroyed airplanes, signals equipment, artillery, ammunition and other Japanese war material. Many soldiers of the division took home Japanese small arms and other items as war souvenirs, and in the 162nd all of the recipients of the Combat Infantryman Badge were given scarves that had been intended for kamikaze pilots.

Meanwhile, morale deteriorated as the men focused on when they could be discharged and return home, resenting that soldiers who had spent the war in the continental United States were being discharged earlier than them. Based on the point system, the experienced combat veterans of the division gradually were sent home individually as fresh replacements arrived. After Thanksgiving, a surprisingly high number of new soldiers who had just arrived from the United States signed up in a reenlistment drive, having been promised Christmas leave at home, angering veterans who were pushed down the list for transportation as a result. By late December, the division transferred its remaining personnel to other units in Japan before officially being inactivated on 31 December.

== Postwar ==
The 162nd Infantry Regiment was reorganized with headquarters Federally recognized on 6 December 1946 at Portland.

== Deployment to Japan in February 1996 ==
Soldiers from the 2nd Battalion, 162nd Infantry Regiment deployed to Japan to participate in the annual bilateral U.S.-Japan cold weather training exercise NORTHWIND 96. For this exercise, the soldiers arrived at Camp Obihiro, Japan, on 18 February 1996, for their annual training mission before moving to the Shikaribetsu Training Area north of Camp Obihiro for the field training exercise.

== Deployment to Saudi Arabia ==
Members of C Company, 2nd Battalion, 162nd Infantry Regiment, located in Eugene, Oregon, deployed to Saudi Arabia in June 1999 through April 2000 to provide security for Patriot sites there. The unit was set to replace a National Guard unit from Arkansas who were deployed there. C Company was organized into three platoons, each assigned to Al Jaber and AL Asalim Air Bases, respectively, and a third, to Mutla Ridge, to guard a communications site. The headquarters section of C Company was based out of Camp Doha, outside Kuwait City.

== Deployment to Japan ==
Soldiers from the 1st Battalion, 162nd Infantry Regiment deployed to Asahikawa, Japan to participate in NORTHWIND 94 to partake in extreme cold weather training.

== Iraq War ==
=== Deployment in Iraq ===
Soldiers from the 1st Battalion, 162nd Infantry Regiment were deployed to Iraq in 2003 for Operation Iraqi Freedom. The 2nd Battalion returned in 2004.

=== Ambushing the Mahdi Army ===
While the 2nd of the 162nd Infantry battalion were stationed at their base Patrol Base Volunteer in Baghdad on August 9, 2004. The Iraqi Shiite insurgent group which was known as the Mahdi Army launched hit-and-run mortar and rocket attacks. The Recon platoon of the 2/162 Infantry Bn requested artillery strikes at the Mahdi Army. But the American high command denied the request to launch an artillery attack in fear of civilian casualties as the Mahdi Army launched their attacks from urban civilian areas. So the Recon platoon decided to infiltrate into the city and ambush the Mahdi Army mortar team. Some time later, the platoon stealthily left their vehicles at an empty building, went up the stairs, and set up a hidden ambush position in an elevated floor level. The Americans set up M240 machine guns, Barrett M107 semi automatic magazine fed .50 caliber sniper rifle firing HE-API round, and M24 sniper rifle. When the Mahdi Army came by setting up their mortar, the Americans sprang their ambush and opened a barrage of fire with their machine guns and sniper rifles. The Mahdi insurgents were completely caught in the open by surprise. For a long while, the Mahdi insurgents were firing randomly in any direction, diving for cover, or trying to find the hidden American ambush position in complete confusion. Later on, the Mahdi Army spotted the hidden American ambush position and opened mortar, sniper, rocket, and rifle fire at the Americans. The American platoon called their high command to request an artillery bombardment on the Mahdi Army. But the American high command denied the request and refused to fire heavy artillery in the urban area in fear of civilian casualties. The American platoon desperately opened more machine gun and sniper fire as the Mahdi Army received more reinforcements. Sgt Andrew Hellman, one of the Americans suffered a Druganov bullet wound through the knee.The American platoon decided to withdraw back to base. All the Americans exited the building, got onto their Humvee vehicles, and safely withdraw back to their base. The Americans who safely returned to base suffered only 1 wounded who survived his wound and got medical treatment. The Mahdi Army suffered at least 22 killed and more than 30 wounded in the American ambush. This American ambush successfully diminished any more Mahdi Army mortar attacks.

=== Attempted Ambush against Insurgent IED placers ===
The American platoon of the 162nd Infantry Regiment again stealthily moved out of their base to set up a hidden position to ambush and kill insurgent IED placers. The Americans went into a house and barricaded the doors, covered the windows, and booby trapped the back yard with claymore mines. The Americans set up sniper ambush firing points. The Americans waited for any insurgent IED placers to come into view for a while. But there was an Iraqi civilian family in the house whose young daughter was pregnant and going into labor. The family pleaded with Americans to let them leave and go to the hospital. However, the Americans had spent enormous effort into finding this perfect ambush position. They did not want to risk being discovered by the enemy by allowing the Iraqi family to leave and possibly tell anyone including insurgents that there were Americans hidden in the house. The American platoon leader though feeling sympathy for the young pregnant Iraqi woman reluctantly denied the family's request to leave and risk being sold out to the enemy. After some good amount of time passed by, the pregnant daughter was in extreme pain as she went into further labor. The American platoon feeling more sympathy for the plight of the Iraqi family gave into the family's request. The Americans allowed the family to leave with their daughter to the hospital. The American platoon knowing that their position was compromised gathered all their equipment including their claymore mines and safely withdrew back to base.

=== Successful Raid in capturing an enemy financier ===
The American platoon of the 162nd Infantry Regiment received a tip of an enemy insurgent financier whose cell was responsible for the death of 40 Iraqi National Guard troops hiding in a car lot. The platoon requested to their commander to immediately order a raid to capture the financier as he might soon relocate to avoid being captured. The commander had a drone scout the area of the location. The commander then gave the green light and the platoon got into their Humvee vehicles and drove to the hideout of the enemy financier. The platoon arrived at the hide out, kicked down the door, surprised and captured the financier. There was a pile of money at the financier's hideout. The Americans gathered all the money, intelligence, and arrested the financier. The Americans all safely returned to base with the enemy financier.

=== Casualties ===
2nd Battalion was deployed in support of Operation Iraqi Freedom twice. 2004 to 2005 and 2009 to 2010. There were 9 KIAs during the 2004-2005 Deployment.

== Deployment to Afghanistan ==
In June 2014 the 2nd Battalion deployed to Afghanistan and returned in May 2015.

== Deployments to other parts of the world ==
Prior to this, the unit had deployed to take part in Team Spirit in Korea in 1988; to the Naval Amphibious Warfare School, Coronado in 1992; and to the Jungle Warfare Center in Panama in 1994. In 2011 they deployed to Thailand in support of Cobra Gold.

== Deployment to Scotland ==
A Company, 2nd Battalion, 162nd Infantry Regiment, also deployed in 1990 to Scotland and in 1991 to Puerto Rico.

== Distinctive unit insignia ==
- Description

A Gold color metal and enamel device 1 1/8 inches (2.9 cm) in height overall consisting of a shield blazoned: Azure, a fess Gules fimbriated Or between in chief a fasces and in base a giant cactus, both of the last. Attached below and to the sides of the shield a Blue scroll inscribed "FIRST TO ASSEMBLE" in Gold letters.

- Symbolism

The shield is blue for Infantry, the red fess with the gold edges gives the Spanish colors and the red fess and the blue shield give the colors of the Philippine service ribbon. The cactus indicates the Mexican Border service and the fasces from the arms of the French Republic indicates service in France.

- Background

The distinctive unit insignia approved on 16 May 1925. It was amended by addition of the word "giant" in the description on 29 June 1964.

== Coat of arms ==
=== Blazon ===
- Shield

Azure, a fess Gules fimbriated Or between in chief a fasces and in base a giant cactus, both of the last.

- Crest

That for the regiments and separate battalions of the Oregon Army National Guard: On a wreath of the colors Or and Azure, a demi-disc Gules charged with the setting sun with twelve light rays Or (the shoulder sleeve insignia of the 41st Division), behind a beaver sejant Proper. Motto FIRST TO ASSEMBLE.

=== Symbolism ===
- Shield

The shield is blue for Infantry, the red fess with the gold edges gives the Spanish colors and the red fess and the blue shield give the colors of the Philippine service ribbon. The cactus indicates the Mexican Border service and the fasces from the arms of the French Republic indicates service in France.

- Crest

The crest is that of the Oregon Army National Guard.

=== Background ===
The coat of arms was originally approved for the 162d Infantry Regiment on 23 August 1924. It was amended by addition of the word "giant" in the blazonry of the shield on 29 June 1964.
