= Wittenberg (town), Wisconsin =

Wittenberg, Wisconsin
- Town
- Town of Wittenberg
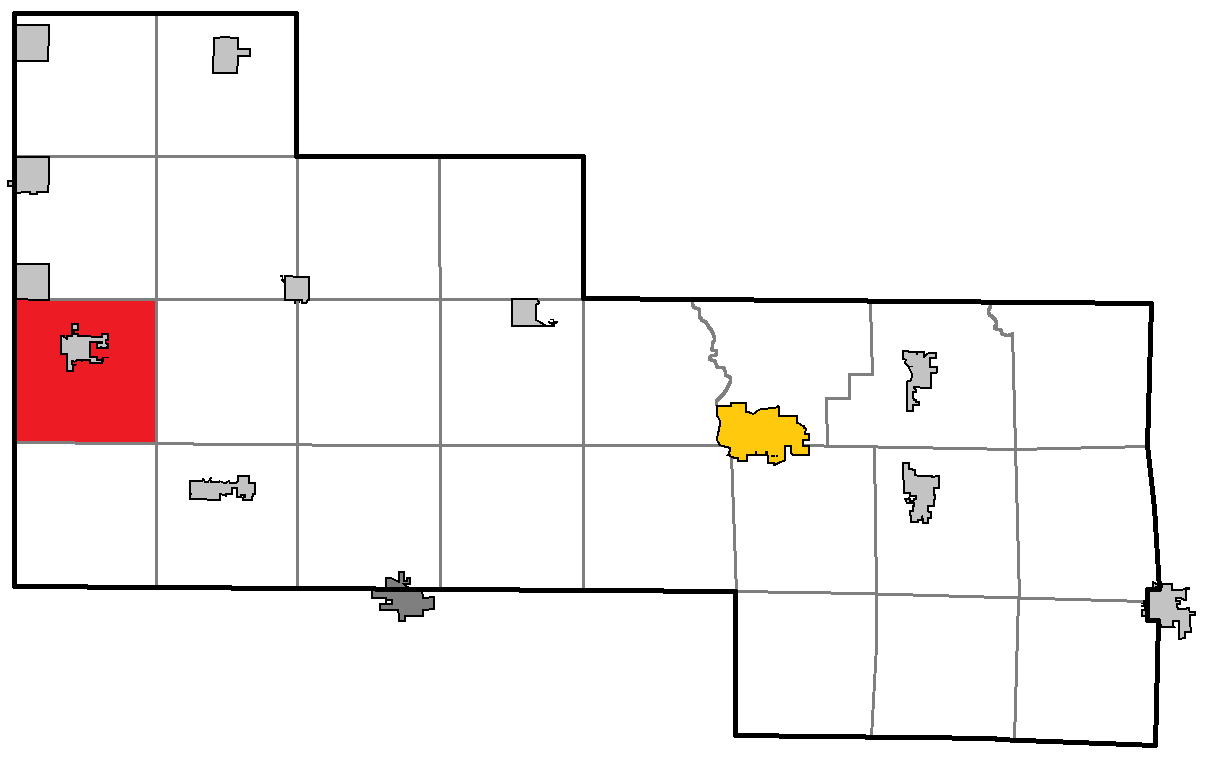
- Location of Wittenberg, within Shawano County
- Coordinates: 44°47′57″N 89°09′40″W
- Country: United States
- State: Wisconsin
- County: Shawano

Area
  - Total: 34.08 sq mi (88.3 km^{2})
  - Land: 33.98 sq mi (88.0 km^{2})
  - Water: 0.1 sq mi (0.26 km^{2})

Population (2020)
  - Total: 823
  - Density: 24.2/sq mi (9.35/km^{2})
- Time zone: UTC-6 (Central (CST))
  - Summer (DST): UTC-5 (CDT)
- Area code(s): 715 & 534
- GNIS feature ID: 1584467

Wittenberg is a town in Shawano County, Wisconsin, United States. Wittenberg was founded by Reverend E.J. Homme in 1879. He also established a home for the aged and an orphanage. As of the 2020 census, the town had a total population of 823. The Village of Wittenberg is located within the town. The unincorporated community of Whitcomb and part of Paac Ciinak is also located within the town.

== Geography ==
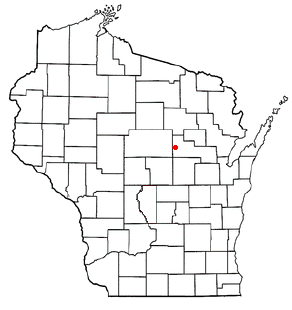
Location of Wittenberg (town), Wisconsin

According to the United States Census Bureau, the town has a total area of 34.2 square miles (88.6 km^{2}), of which 34.1 square miles (88.3 km^{2}) is land and 0.1 square mile (0.3 km^{2}) (0.29%) is water.

== Demographics ==
As of the census of 2000, there were 894 people, 298 households, and 238 families residing in the town. The population density was 26.2 people per square mile (10.1/km^{2}). There were 331 housing units at an average density of 9.7 per square mile (3.7/km^{2}). The racial makeup of the town was 93.62% White, 2.24% Black or African American, 3.24% Native American, 0.11% from other races, and 0.78% from two or more races. 0.67% of the population were Hispanic or Latino of any race.

There were 298 households, out of which 36.9% had children under the age of 18 living with them, 68.1% were married couples living together, 6.7% had a female householder with no husband present, and 19.8% were non-families. 16.8% of all households were made up of individuals, and 9.1% had someone living alone who was 65 years of age or older. The average household size was 2.72 and the average family size was 3.04.

In the town, the population was spread out, with 33.3% under the age of 18, 5.8% from 18 to 24, 25.8% from 25 to 44, 21.6% from 45 to 64, and 13.4% who were 65 years of age or older. The median age was 34 years. For every 100 females, there were 123.5 males. For every 100 females age 18 and over, there were 103.4 males.

The median income for a household in the town was $42,841, and the median income for a family was $44,904. Males had a median income of $29,732 versus $20,962 for females. The per capita income for the town was $15,410. About 6.0% of families and 6.7% of the population were below the poverty line, including 9.0% of those under age 18 and 11.9% of those age 65 or over.

== Activities ==
The Town of Wittenberg's natural landscape encourages outdoor pursuits including hiking, riding, fishing, and birdwatching. Settings for outdoor activities include the Wiouwash & Mountain Bay State trails, Homme Pond, Panic Park, and the Embarrass River Park area along County Road Q.
