= 101st Field Artillery Regiment =

101st Field Artillery
- 101st Field Artillery Coat of arms
- Active: 1636–present (389 years)
- Country: Massachusetts Bay Colony (1636–1686, 1689-1692); Dominion of New England (1686-1689); Province of Massachusetts Bay (1692-1775); United Colonies (1775-1776); United States (1776–present)
- Branch: Massachusetts Army National Guard
- Garrison/HQ: Brockton, Massachusetts
- Nickname: Boston Light Artillery (special designation)
- Motto: Vincere est Vivere (To Conquer is to Live)
- Equipment: M777A2 155mm Howitzer (Charlie) M119A3 105mm Howitzer (Alpha, Bravo) Q36 / Q37 Target Acquisition Radar
- Engagements: Colonial Wars Pequot War; King Philip's War; King William's War; Queen Anne's War; King George's War; French and Indian War; American Wars; American Revolutionary War: Monmouth; War of 1812; American Civil War: First Bull Run; Yorktown; Peninsula Campaign; Second Bull Run; Antietam; Fredericksburg; Chancellorsville; Gettysburg; Wilderness; Spotsylvania; Cold Harbor; Second Battle of Petersburg; Appomattox; War with Spain: Puerto Rican Campaign; World War I: Champagne-Marne; Aisne-Marne; Saint-Mihiel; Meuse-Argonne; World War II: Northern France; Rhineland; Ardennes-Alsace; Central Europe; Korean War; Afghanistan Campaign Iraq Campaign
- Decorations: Meritorious Unit Commendation (OEF Afghanistan) Superior Unit Award (IFOR Service) Joint Meritorious Unit Award Presidential Unit Citation

Commanders
- Notable commanders: John Winthrop; Myles Standish (Plymouth Company Commander)

Insignia
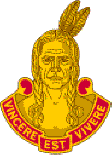
- Distinctive unit insignia

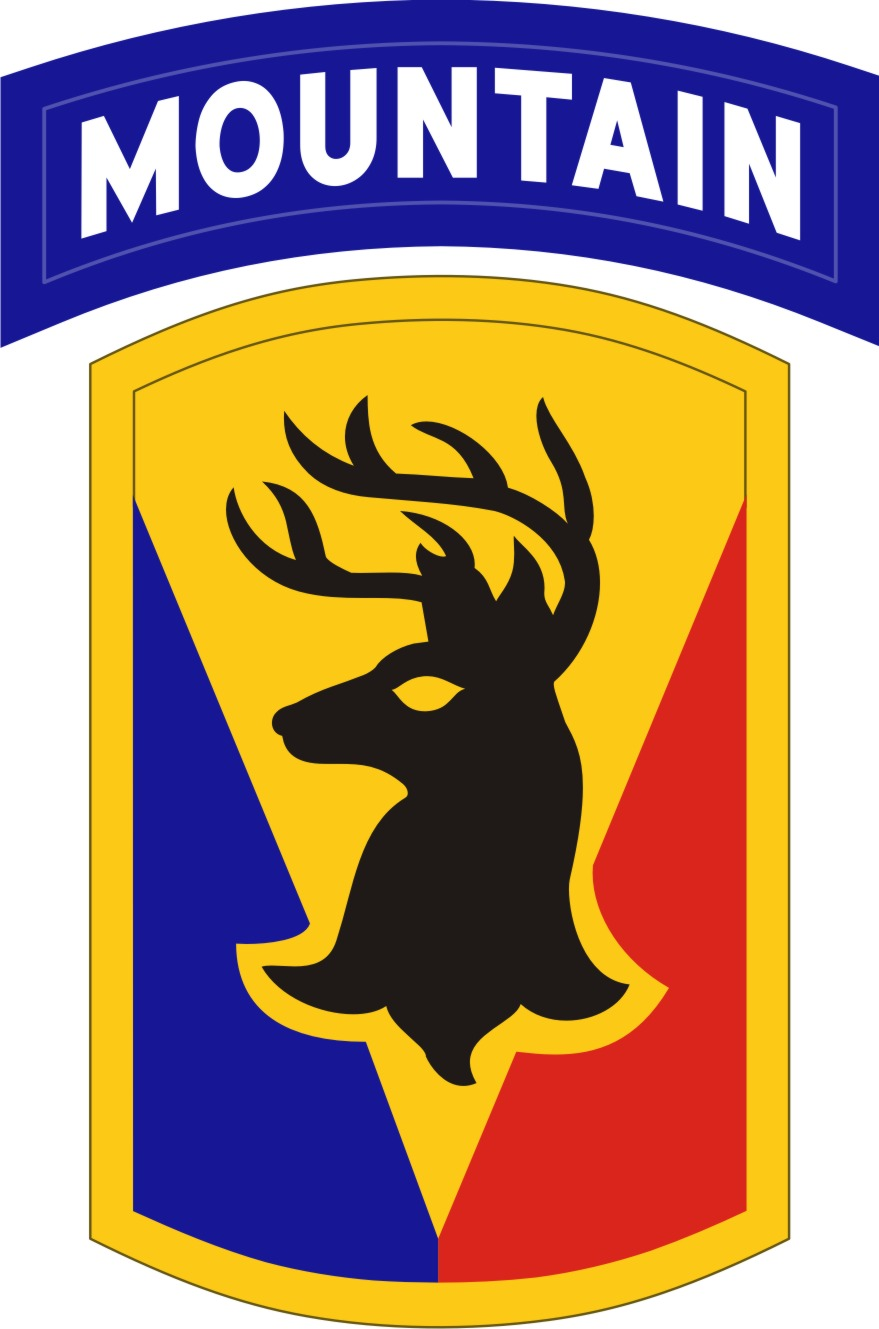
- 86th IBCT shoulder sleeve insignia, worn by 1-101st FA

The 101st Field Artillery ("Boston Light Artillery") regiment is the oldest active field artillery regiment in the United States Army, with a lineage dating to 13 December 1636 when it was organized as the South Regiment. It is one of several National Guard units with colonial roots and campaign credit for the War of 1812. For the first 250 years of the unit's existence, it was organized as an infantry unit.

== History ==
The 101st Field Artillery Regiment was first formed on 13 December 1636 as the South Regiment by the Massachusetts General Court. Its first commander was Colonel John Winthrop. Since its creation, the regiment has served in six colonial wars and nine American wars totalling 47 campaigns, through 2010.

In addition to its own lineage, the 101st Field Artillery Regiment has been consolidated with the following units and holds their lineages and honors: the 180th Field Artillery Regiment; the 211th Field Artillery Regiment; the 241st Field Artillery Regiment; and the 272nd Field Artillery Battalion. Battery C, 1st Battalion, 101st Field Artillery holds the lineage of the 102nd Field Artillery and the Second Corps of Cadets.

== Recent Organization ==
The regiment currently consists of the Headquarters and Headquarters Battery, 1st Battalion, 101st Field Artillery Regiment based in Brockton, Massachusetts and an inactive Battery E, 101st Field Artillery, formerly based in Rehoboth, Massachusetts. Both units are in the Massachusetts National Guard.

Battery A, 1st Battalion, 101st Field Artillery is based in Fall River, Massachusetts. Battery B is based in Pittsfield, Massachusetts after recently being transferred from the Vermont National Guard. Battery C is based in Danvers, Massachusetts.

As part of ongoing reorganizations, the 1st Battalion, 101st Field Artillery has been part of the 26th Infantry Division Artillery (1975–1993), the 42nd Infantry Division Artillery (1993–2003), the 29th Infantry Division Artillery (2003- 2006?) and the 26th Infantry Brigade Combat Team (2006? - 2009?). Since 2009(?), the battalion has been assigned to the 86th Infantry Brigade Combat Team (IBCT), and in 2016 the 86th IBCT was reorganized under the 10th Mountain Division as part of the Army's Associated Units Program.

Battery E, 101st FA served as a target acquisition battery in the 26th Infantry Division Artillery, the 42nd Infantry Division Artillery, and the 197th Field Artillery Brigade. Battery E inactivated in (??) as part of force reductions.

== Current Organization ==
- 1st Battalion, 101st Field Artillery Regiment
  - Headquarters & Headquarters Battery - Brockton, MA
  - Battery A (M119A3) - Fall River, MA
  - Battery B (M119A3) - Pittsfield, MA
  - Battery C (M777A2) - Danvers, MA
  - Company F, 186th Brigade Support Battalion - Quincy, MA

== Recent Overseas Actions ==
- In July 2021, Headquarters and Headquarters Battery, 1st Battalion, 101st Field Artillery Regiment deployed to the Hamid Karzai International Airport in Kabul, Afghanistan as part of the defense (C-RAM) and retrograde of all remaining U.S. forces from Afghanistan and was part of the international humanitarian effort to evacuate Afghani civilians from Kabul, remaining on ground until 11:58 pm on August 30, 2021 (2021 Kabul airlift).

== Notable non-combat actions ==
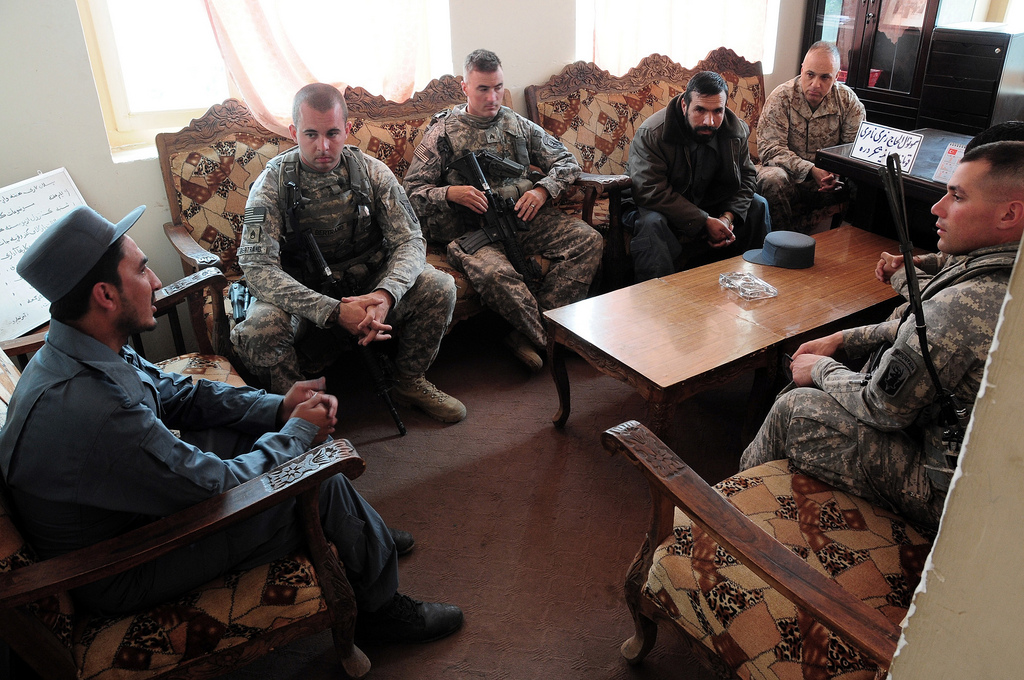
86th IBCT visit the town and police department of Shakadara, Afghanistan. Members of the 86th IBCT regularly provide mentoring and training to police departments in outlying areas of Kabul

- In August 1765, the regiment was activated to patrol the streets of Boston to help quell riots that broke out in response to the Stamp Act.(241st FA Regiment Lineage).
- In March 1770, elements of the regiment again patrolled the streets of Boston to enforce the law after the Boston Massacre.(241st FA Regiment Lineage).
- In 1786 during Shays' Rebellion, members of the regiment protected judges and the Taunton courthouse after it was surrounded by insurgents. (211th FA Lineage)
- Between July and October 1863, the regiment served in New York City to enforce draft laws after the New York Draft Riots (241st FA Regiment Lineage).
- The regiment was called into state service on 14 July 1863 during the Boston Draft riots (101st FA Regiment lineage). While manning the Cooper Street Armory in Boston's North End, the armory was attacked by over 1,000 rioters intent upon seizing the weapons stored there. When the mob penetrated the armory's main gate, the soldiers opened fire killing and wounding dozens of rioters, effectively ending the attack.
- The regiment was reviewed by President Andrew Johnson in 1867, President Ulysses S. Grant in 1869 and President Chester A. Arthur in 1882.(241st FA Regiment Lineage).
- The regiment took part in the funeral of President Ulysses S. Grant in 1885.(241st FA Regiment Lineage).
- On November 14, 1888, Battery A of the regiment fired in salute as part of dedication to the Boston Massacre/Crispus Attucks monument, the first state funded monument in Massachusetts.
- From 16 June to 27 November 1916, the regiment was federalized and served in Texas during the Mexican Border crises (101st FA Regiment lineage – also see Pancho Villa Expedition).
- In May 1996, Detachment 1, Headquarters Battery, 101st Field Artillery Battalion was ordered to active duty to serve with the Nordic-Polish Brigade in Bosnia in support of Operation Joint Endeavor.
- In May 1997, Echo Battery, 101st Field Artillery (TAB) was activated and served throughout Bosnia in support of Operation Joint Guard.
- After the terrorist attacks on 11 September 2001, members of the 1st Battalion 101st Field Artillery served on state orders protecting the Pilgrim Nuclear Power Plant and the Massachusetts Military Reservation at Camp Edwards.
- Select soldiers served as part of a joint operations task force providing security for the 2002 Olympic Winter Games in Salt Lake City, Utah
- The regiments howitzers fire blank rounds each Fourth of July during the Boston Pops Orchestra's playing of the 1812 Overture. It also provides howitzers to fire during a Fourth of July concert in Plymouth, Massachusetts.
- On the first Monday in June, the regiment provides a howitzer salute as part of the Ancient and Honorable Artillery Company of Massachusetts' June day drumhead election reenactment ceremony which is held on Boston Common close to the Massachusetts State House.

== Notable members ==
- Colonel John Winthrop – First commander, South Regiment
- Captain John Underhill – First full-time training officer, Commander Boston Company
- Captain Myles Standish – First commander Plymouth Company (211th FA Lineage)
- Corporal Nathaniel M. Allen – Was awarded the Medal of Honor for saving the regimental colors from capture during the Battle of Gettysburg.
- Private Walter Brennan, three-time Academy Award-winning actor, served with the 101st in France in World War I.
- Ernest R. Redmond – United States Army officer who served with the 101st Field Artillery in World War I and was later Chief of the National Guard Bureau
- John H. Sherburne – U.S. Army brigadier general

== See also ==
- Yankee Division
- Rainbow Division
- 29th Infantry Division
