= Helmer Swenholt =

United States Army officer

- Born: June 28, 1886; Wittenberg, Wisconsin, U.S.
- Died: May 8, 1952 (aged 65); Tucson, Arizona, U.S.
- Military career
- Allegiance: United States of America
- Branch: United States Army
- Active: 1908–1945
- Rank: Colonel
- Unit: 332nd Engineer Special Service Regiment
- Commands: 332nd Engineer Special Service Regiment; 332nd Engineer General Service Regiment; Southern Base Engineer Group No. 2
- Awards: Legion of Merit; Bronze Star; Purple Heart; Legion of Honor(France)

Helmer Swenholt (28 June 1886 – 8 May 1952) was born in Wittenberg, Wisconsin (near Shawano, Wisconsin). Having pursued a degree in engineering, he put his education to work in the Army Corps of Engineers. He was an officer and Veteran of World War I, and after the war continued his service in the Army Corps of Engineers. In World War II, Swenholt organized one of the first of the Engineer Regiments, a new type of combat engineer organization. At the war's conclusion Swenholt returned to the United States and retired from the Army.

== Family ==
His father was Jonas Swenholt, who served in the Wisconsin State Assembly.

== Education ==
He graduated from the University of Wisconsin–Madison in 1908 in engineering. Swenholt had played basketball at the University of Wisconsin–Madison, where he was named to the All Big Ten team. Swenholt, a forward on the basketball team, was elected captain for the 1907–1908 season of the Badger squad. He had tied with a teammate for the honor and the election was decided by a coin toss. He joined the National Guard.

== World War I ==
He became a captain in an engineer company in World War I and was wounded in France in 1918. Captain Swenholt worked on the railroad from Murmansk with the Bolsheviks. In 1918 he decided to stay in the Regular Army. He briefly visited his hometown and then left for Morgantown, West Virginia for service at the state university. He was assigned to serve as an ROTC engineer instructor at West Virginia University. He would occasionally return to his home in Madison, Wisconsin to visit his parents and sister...

== Between wars / Corps of Engineers ==
He was assigned in 1922 to Camp Humphreys, Gary, Indiana, with the engineers in the regular army. He was a Federal instructor with the National Guard unit of Indiana. In one incident his car caught fire but no one was injured. In 1928 he moved to New Orleans where he was assigned to the River and Harbor Engineer District Office. In 1930 he went to Panama where he worked with the Eleventh Engineers for two years. He was assigned in 1932 to Fort Dupont, Delaware, to organize the Civilian Conservation Corps units to provide housing, food, and medical care in the U.S. National Forest Service in the National Forests in Idaho. There was a brief period in 1932 where the War Department considered retiring Colonel Swenholt (with many other officers) during a time when there was a military downsizing. This did not happen and Swenholt remained in the Army. In 1935 he was ordered back to Dupont, Delaware, and to Oakland, California, where he was assigned to the Topographic Engineers at Fort Stevens, Oregon, to map various areas in three states along the Pacific Coast. In 1937 he mapped Centralia, Washington and Fort Barry, California, for the same company (Company A, 29th U.S. Engineers. This was one of the first times the airplane was used to make ground maps by making photographs and the Army was working in conjunction with the Coast Survey and Geodetic Survey departments to map this part of the country. In September 1938 Swenholt was assigned to command the District Engineer Office, Omaha, Nebraska. One of their assignments was to stabilize the banks of the Mississippi by sinking pilings along the northern edge of Omaha in an effort to change the channel. In early 1941 when the Army foresaw the need to begin armament, Major Swenholt's command was assigned the task of relocating roads, railroads and sewer lines in preparation for building the plant which would make the Martin B-26 Bomber. Bids for building the plant (estimated to be $10M) were solicited February 9, 1941. The plant was known as the Fort Crook Bomber Plant. Groundbreaking was Monday March 3, 1941 with Major Swenholt turning the first shovelful of dirt. Glenn Martin attended the event. Swenholt was to supervise the construction of the plant.

== World War II ==
In May 1942 the colonel was assigned to command and train the 332nd Engineer Special Service Regiment (later reclassified as the 332nd Engineer General Service Regiment) at Camp Claibourne, Louisiana, for heavy construction overseas. His charge to the unit was "To Build - To Conquer." This became the motto of the unit. Colonel Helmer Swenholt commanded the 332nd Engineer General Service Regiment until 28 November 1945 when he retired from the Army. Colonel Swenholt died 8 May 1952 in Tucson, Arizona.

== Chronology of life events ==
- June 28, 1886 Born in Wittenberg, Shawano Co, WI
- September 4, 1917 Appointed captain, Engineer Service, ORC (Officer Reserve Corp)
- December 28, 1917 Entered on active duty for assignment at Camp Campbell, Virginia; assigned as a Student Engineer, ROTC, at Camp Lee, VA with duties as camp instructor.
- April, 1918 Attached to 44th Engineers and served as company commander at Fort Benjamin Harrison, Virginia, and Camp Merritt, New Jersey
- April 19, 1918 Married Chicago, Cook County, Illinois to Virginia Williams.
- August, 1918 Left United States for foreign service in France, England, and Russia.
- August, 1919 Stationed in Washington, D.C., in the Office of the Chief of Engineers.
- October, 1919 Served as assistant professor of military science and tactics at West Virginia University, Morgantown, West Virginia.
- April, 1920 Instructor in bridges and hydrographic surveying and as camp officer at Camp A.A. Humphreys (Fort Belvoir), VA
- September, 1920 Assigned Assistant Professor, Military Science and Tactics and officer in charge of the Engineers Unit, ROTC, West Virginia University, Morgantown, West Virginia.
- July, 1921 Assumed command of the Engineers Unit at West Virginia University.
- June, 1923 Company officer at ROTC Camp, Camp Meade, Maryland.
- September, 1923 Attended Engineers School at Fort Humphrey, Virginia.
- June, 1924 Assigned duty in charge of supply in company, instructor in engineering, and mess officer at Camp Knox, Kentucky.
- July, 1924 Instructor, 113th Engineers, with Indiana National Guard at Gary, IN
- July, 1928 Military assistant in charge of survey and investigation, Bonnet Carré Spillway and also assistant to officer in charge of design at the New Orleans River District, New Orleans, LA.
- September, 1930 Served as company commander of Company E, 11th Engineers, at Corozal, in Panama Canal Department, Canal Zone.
- September, 1932 Company commander of 1st Engineers at Fort Dupont, Delaware and Camp Dix, New Jersey.
- July, 1933 Commanded 1224th Company, CCC, at Clarkia, Idaho, Fort Dupont, Delaware, Camp Lewes, Delaware, and Camp Dix, N.J.
- June, 1934 Company commander, construction at Camp Dix, N.J.
- December, 1934 Company commander, Ordinary Garrison Training at Fort Dupont, Delaware.
- September, 1935 Assigned company commander, Company A, 29th Engineers, stationed at Fort Stevens, Oregon and Fort Berry, California
- September, 1938 Assigned executive assistant on River and Harbor duty and district engineer in charge of all work on the Missouri River, and stationed at Omaha, Nebraska.
- May, 1942 Commanded the 332nd Engineer Regiment, Camp Clairborne, LA and saw overseas duty in Europe.
- July, 1942 Colonel Swenholt left the United States for foreign service and was stationed in England, France and served as regimental commander of the 332nd Engineer General Service Regiment.
- November, 1945 Assigned to Office, Chief of Engineers, Washington, D.C.
- May 8, 1952 Died in Tucson, Pima County, Arizona.
