= Creed C. Hammond =

American major general (1874–1940)

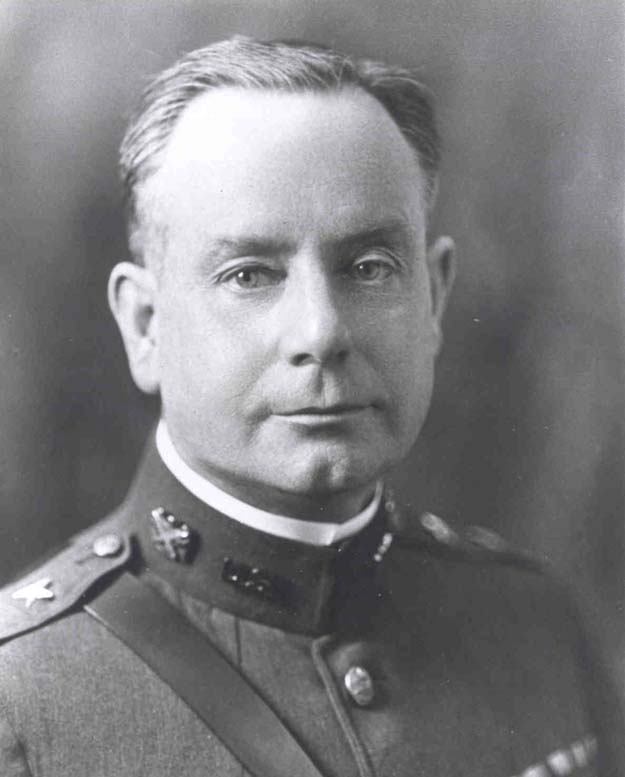
- General Hammond as National Guard Bureau Chief
- Born: October 9, 1874; Eugene, Oregon, US
- Died: April 2, 1940 (aged 65); Portland, Oregon, US
- Burial place: Lincoln Memorial Park, Portland Oregon
- Military career
- Allegiance: United States
- Branch: United States Army
- Service years: 1892–1929
- Rank: Major general
- Units: Oregon Army National Guard; National Guard Bureau
- Commands: 39th Coast Artillery Regiment; 162nd Infantry Regiment; Chief of the National Guard Bureau
- Conflicts: Spanish–American War; World War I
- Other work: Retail merchandiser Deputy sheriff Real estate broker Bank officer Auditor General of the Philippines

Creed C. Hammond (October 9, 1874 – April 2, 1940) was a major general in the United States Army. He served as Chief of the National Guard Bureau.

== Early life ==
Creed Cheshire Hammond was born in Eugene City, Oregon, on October 9, 1874. In 1892, he enlisted in Company C, 2nd Oregon Infantry of the Oregon Army National Guard. He graduated from the University of Oregon in 1896, and worked as a retail merchandiser.

== Spanish–American War ==
Hammond enlisted for the Spanish–American War, joining Company I, 1st Nebraska Volunteer Infantry. He served in the Philippines, and attained the rank of First Sergeant.

== Post Spanish–American War ==
In 1901, Hammond was commissioned as a second lieutenant in the Oregon Army National Guard's 4th Infantry Regiment. While continuing his military career Hammond lived in Eugene, and worked as a deputy sheriff, real estate broker, and officer of the Bank of Commerce. Hammond was promoted to colonel in 1911 as a member of the Governor's staff.

== World War I ==
At the start of World War I, Hammond was commander of the 39th Coast Artillery Regiment. He was later appointed commander of the 162nd Infantry Regiment, a unit of the 81st Brigade, 41st Infantry Division. His regiment performed garrison and training site duties in the United States, as well as providing replacement troops for other regiments.

== Post World War I ==
From 1919 to 1920 Hammond was Cashier of the Portland National Bank.

In 1920 he returned to active duty as a member of the General Staff, where he played a key role in the creation of the National Defense Act of 1920.

== National Guard Bureau ==
From 1922 to 1925 Hammond served as Assistant to the National Guard Bureau Chief (then called the Militia Bureau) and Chief of the Finance Division. In 1925 Hammond was appointed Chief of the Militia Bureau and promoted to major general.

== Later career ==
Hammond served as Militia Bureau Chief until 1929. Initial reports indicated that he was likely to be appointed to another term, which was favored by 46 of 48 state governors, who were empowered to make a recommendation to the President under the 1920 National Defense Act. However, Secretary of War James W. Good announced the adoption of a "rotation policy" for high level assignments, and Hammond left the post when his term expired.

After retiring from the military, Hammond accepted appointment as Auditor General of the territorial government in the Philippines, where he served until 1933.

== Retirement and death ==
In retirement Hammond resided in Portland. He died in Portland on April 2, 1940, and was buried at Portland's Lincoln Memorial Park.

Military offices
Preceded by George C. Rickards	Chief of the National Guard Bureau; 1925–1929	Succeeded by Ernest R. Redmond (acting)
