= Jonas Swenholt =

American politician

- Born: Jonas Swenholt; December 20, 1855; Oconomowoc Wisconsin, US
- Died: March 8, 1923 (aged 67); Madison Wisconsin, US
- Resting place: Madison, Dane County Wisconsin, US
- Occupations: Politician and businessman
- Political party: Republican
- Spouse: Anna Lysne (m. 1883)
- Children: 2

Jonas Swenholt (December 20, 1855 – March 8, 1923) was an American businessman and politician. He was a member of the Wisconsin State Assembly.

Jonas Swenholt born in the town of Oconomowoc, Waukesha County, Wisconsin. He was the son of John and Ingeborg Swenholt, both of whom were immigrants from Norway. Swenholt moved with his parents to a farm in Scandinavia, Wisconsin in Waupaca County, Wisconsin in 1863. In 1880, Swenholt moved to Wittenberg, Wisconsin in Shawano County, Wisconsin. Swenholt was in the mercantile and lumber business. He served as postmaster of Wittenberg and different village and town offices. Swenholt served as register of deeds for Shawano County in 1896. Swenholt then served in the Wisconsin State Assembly in 1901 and 1905 as a Republican from Shawano County. In 1905, Swenholt moved to Madison, Wisconsin where he was the Wisconsin State Game Warden until 1907; he then worked as a mail clerk until his death. Swenholt died of a stroke at his house in Madison, Wisconsin. His son was Helmer Swenholt, a United States Army officer.
