= 332nd Infantry Regiment =

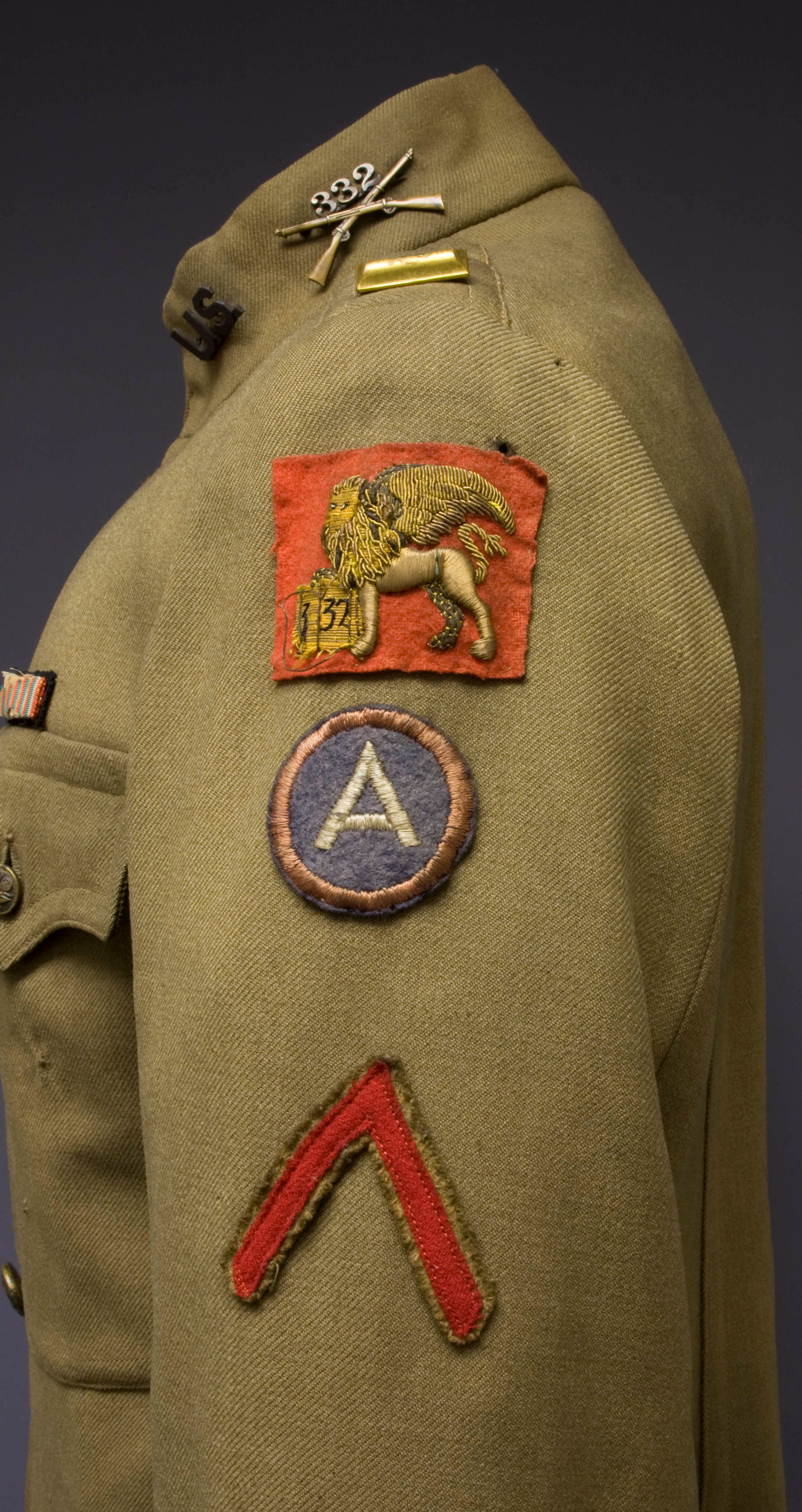
- World War I second lieutenant's uniform including the shoulder sleeve insignia of the 332nd Infantry
- Active: 1917–1919; 1921–1942; 1952-1965
- Country: United States of America
- Allegiance: United States Army
- Type: Infantry
- Size: Regiment
- Mascot: Lion of St. Mark
- Engagements: World War I: Italian campaign

Commanders
- Notable commanders: William G. Everson

The 332nd Infantry Regiment was an infantry regiment of the United States Army, active during World War I. It was initially part of the 83rd Division, but was detached to serve on the Italian front during the war, taking part in the Battle of Vittorio Veneto. It was disbanded in May 1919.

== History ==
=== World War I ===
==== Formation ====
The 332nd Infantry Regiment was formed on 30 August 1917 as part of the 83rd Division. Following a number of months of training in the United States, the regiment, under the command of Colonel William Wallace, embarked upon the troopship RMS Aquitania at New York, and departed for Europe on 8 June 1918. They arrived in Liverpool, England on 15 June, and entrained for Southampton from where they embarked again for the trip across the English Channel to France.

==== Service in Italy ====
Shortly after the regiment's arrival in France, they were informed that they would be sent to serve in Italy instead. They arrived there in July 1918 in response from an urgent request from the Italian Government. In addition to the American infantry force, 30 American ambulance sections, a base hospital, and 54 airplane pilots also served with the Italian Army. The American pilots, as members of the Italian bombardment squadrons, engaged in bombing raids behind Austrian lines, being especially active during the progress of the Vittorio Veneto offensive.

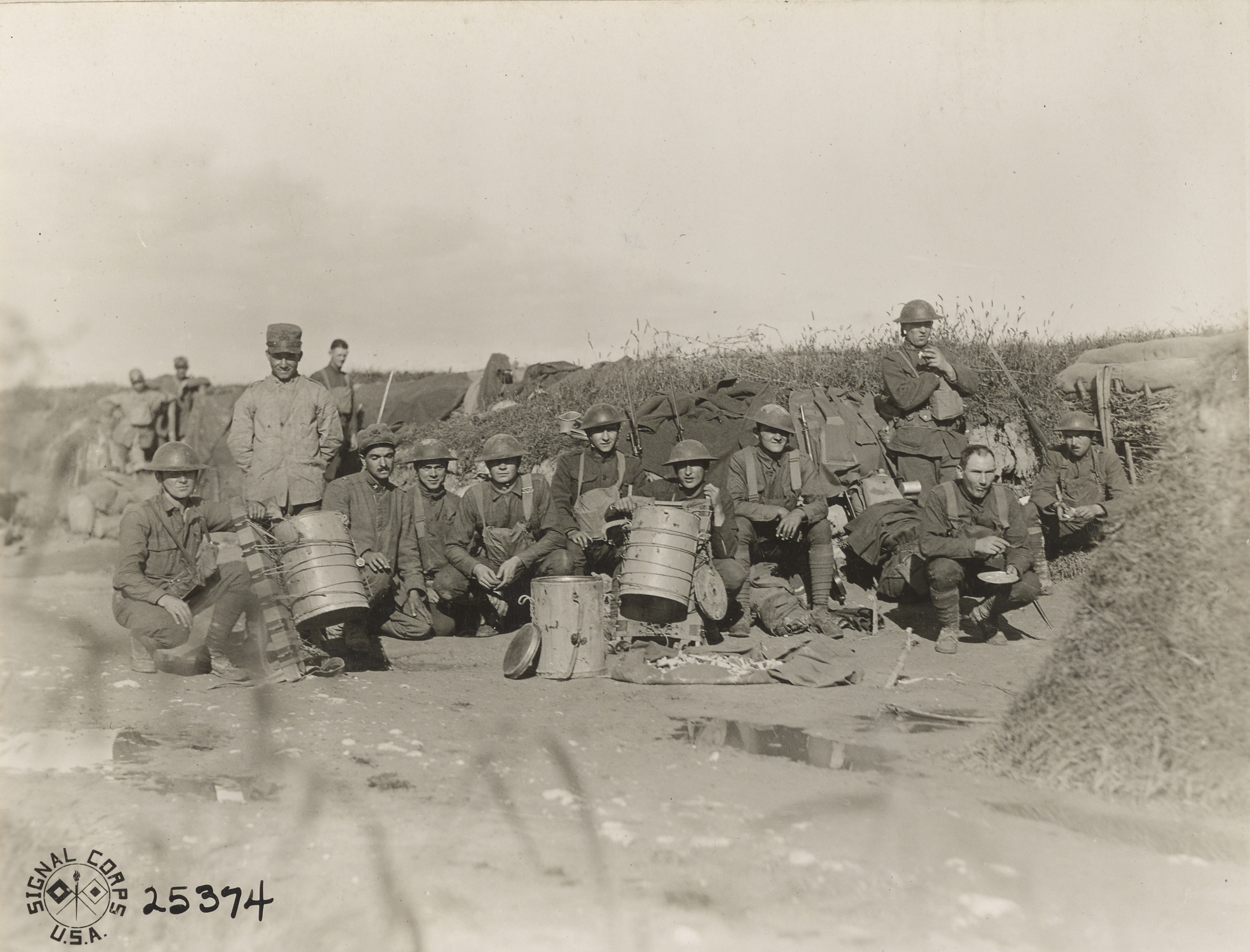
Doughboys of the 2nd Battalion, 332nd Infantry in front line trenches on the Piave sector, near Varage, Italy, September 28, 1918.

Its principal missions were to build up Italian morale and to depress that of the enemy by creating the impression that a large force of Americans had reached the front and was preparing to enter that battle line and take an active part in the fighting. The regiment was first stationed near Lake Garda, where it trained in methods of warfare suitable for the difficult mountain terrain which comprised the greater part of the Italian Theater of Operations. Early in October it moved to Treviso, behind the Piave River Front, where it was assigned to the Italian 31st Division. From there, for the purposes of deceiving the enemy, it staged a series of marches in which each battalion, with different articles of uniform and equipment, left the city by different road, circulated during daylight hours in exposed positions for both the Italians and Austrians to see, and returned after nightfall to its station at Treviso in as inconspicuous a manner as possible.

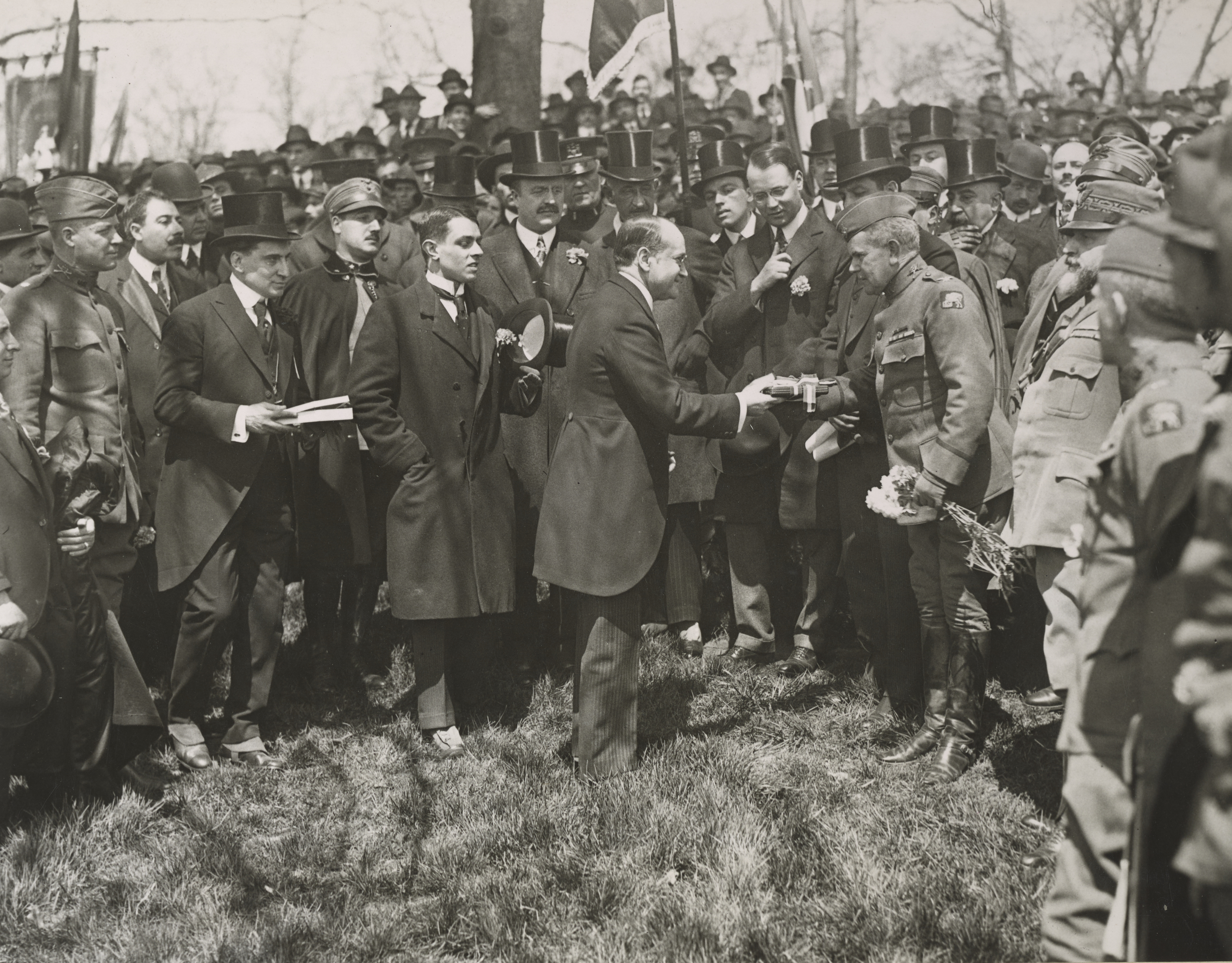
Italian Consul General presents medal to the commander of the 332nd Infantry on behalf of the Italian government, April 1919.

On 24 October, the opening day of the Vittorio Veneto offensive, the Italian 31st Division with the 332nd Infantry attached, was in reserve. It joined the pursuit of the fleeing Austrians on 29 October as part of the British XIV Corps of the Italian Tenth Army, the American regiment forming the advance guard of the corps. On 3 November, after several hard marches, the 332nd Infantry established contact with an enemy rear-guard battalion which was defending the crossings of the Tagliamento River near the village of Ponte-della-Delizia. Early on 4 November, the 2nd Battalion crossed the river on a narrow foot bridge, and—after a brief fight—captured the Austrian position on the far side. Continuing to move forward along the Treviso-Udine railroad, the 2nd battalion occupied the town of Codroipo where it took possession of large stores of munitions and supplies. At 3:00 p.m., 4 November, when the armistice between Italy and Austria-Hungary became effective, the leading American elements were at Villaorba.

After the Armistice, the American troops formed part of the Allied forces stationed in Austria and along the Dalmatian coast. The 1st and 3rd Battalions were at Cormons near Gorizia. Later in November, the 1st Battalion was ordered to go to Treviso and the 3rd Battalion to Fiume. The 2nd Battalion was stationed at Cattaro, Dalmatia, and a detachment from it was sent to Cetinje, Montenegro. During this time, the regiment undertook peacekeeping duties.

==== Shoulder sleeve insignia ====
The 332nd Infantry Regiment's insignia was created as a commemoration of its service in Italy. It consisted of an embroidered winged Lion of St. Mark (symbol of Venice) with one paw resting on an open Bible, and the Bible inscribed with the number "332".

==== Disbandment ====
In February 1919, the 332nd Infantry Regiment received orders to return to the United States. As the regiment's three battalions had been dispersed, it was not until 29 March 1919 that the regiment embarked upon the SS Duca d'Aosta. They arrived at New York on 14 April, and the following week paraded through the city. Shortly afterwards, the regiment was moved back to Camp Sherman, Ohio, where on 26 April the regiment marched through Cleveland, Ohio.

The process of demobilization began after this and over the course of a couple of weeks its various subunits were disbanded as personnel were discharged. On 5 May 1919, the regiment itself was finally disbanded.

=== Interwar period ===
The 332nd Infantry Regiment was reconstituted in the Organized Reserve on 24 June 1921, assigned to the 83rd Division, and allotted to the Fifth Corps Area. The regiment was initiated at Findlay, Ohio, on 8 November 1921. Battalion headquarters were organized at Paulding, Ohio, Lima, Ohio, and Sandusky, Ohio. The regiment conducted its summer training with the 10th Infantry at Camp Knox, Kentucky or with the 11th Infantry at Fort Benjamin Harrison, Indiana. The regiment also conducted the Citizens' Military Training Camps in its assigned area at Camp Knox, Fort Benjamin Harrison, or Fort Thomas some years as an alternate form of summer training. The primary Reserve Officers' Training Corps "feeder" school for the regiment was the University of Dayton.

=== World War II ===
The 83rd Infantry Division was ordered into active federal service on 15 August 1942. As U.S. Army infantry divisions were in the process of transitioning from a "square" (four infantry regiments) to a "triangular" (three infantry regiments) structure, the 332nd Infantry Regiment was allotted to the Army of the United States as an inactive unit on 2 April 1943.

=== Postwar period ===
On 20 May 1952, the 332nd Infantry was withdrawn from the Army of the United States and allotted to the Army Reserve as an element of the 83rd Infantry Division. In 1963, the 3rd Battalion, 2nd Infantry Regiment was withdrawn from the Regular Army and assigned to the 83rd Infantry Division. It was consolidated with the 332nd Infantry Regiment. The 3rd Battalion, 2nd Infantry was inactivated in December 1965.

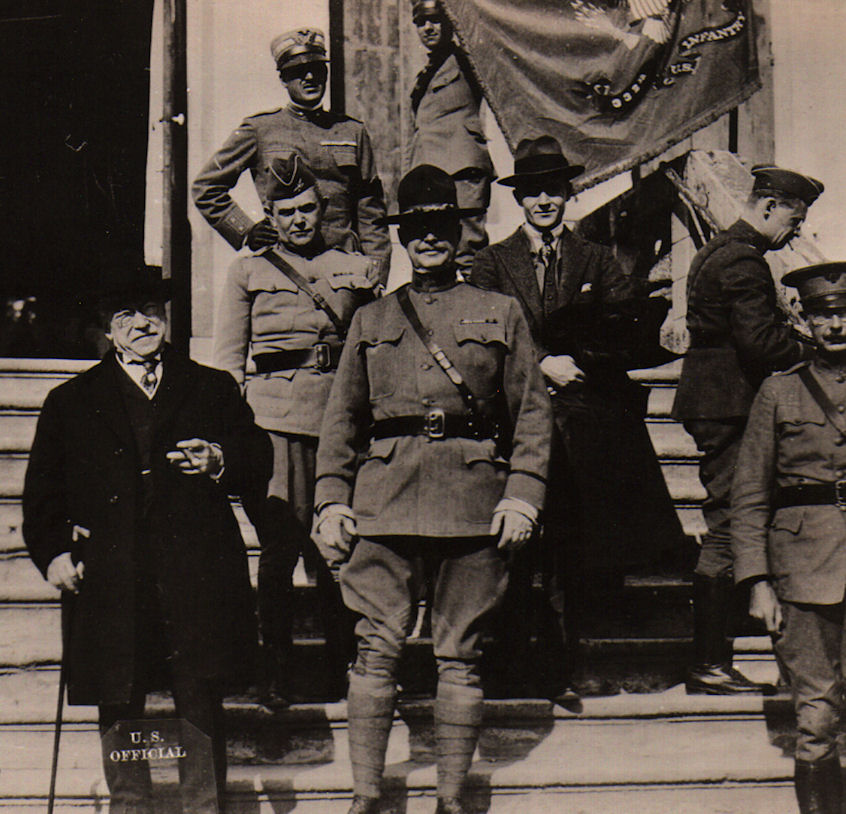
Mr. Samuel Gompers, the famous labor leader, poses for a photograph in front of an Italian villa with Colonel William Wallace, the commander of the 332nd Infantry Regiment, and Brigadier General Charles Treat. Note the 332nd Colors in the background. 12 October 1918. Courtesy National Archives.

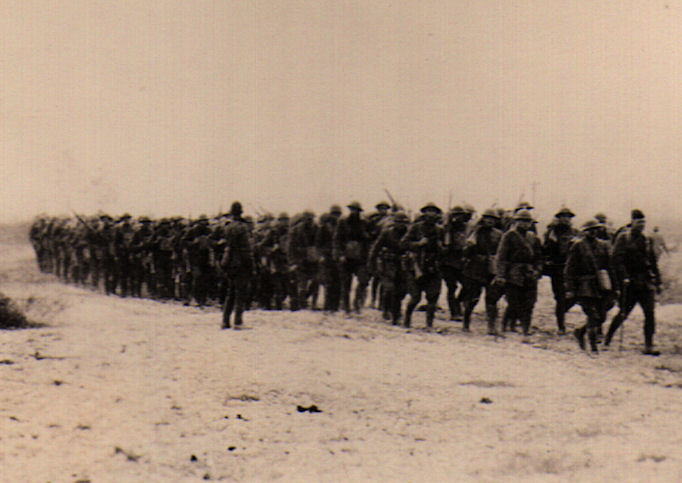
Headquarters Company crossing at Grave di Papadopoli on the afternoon of 31 October 1918. Courtesy National Archives.

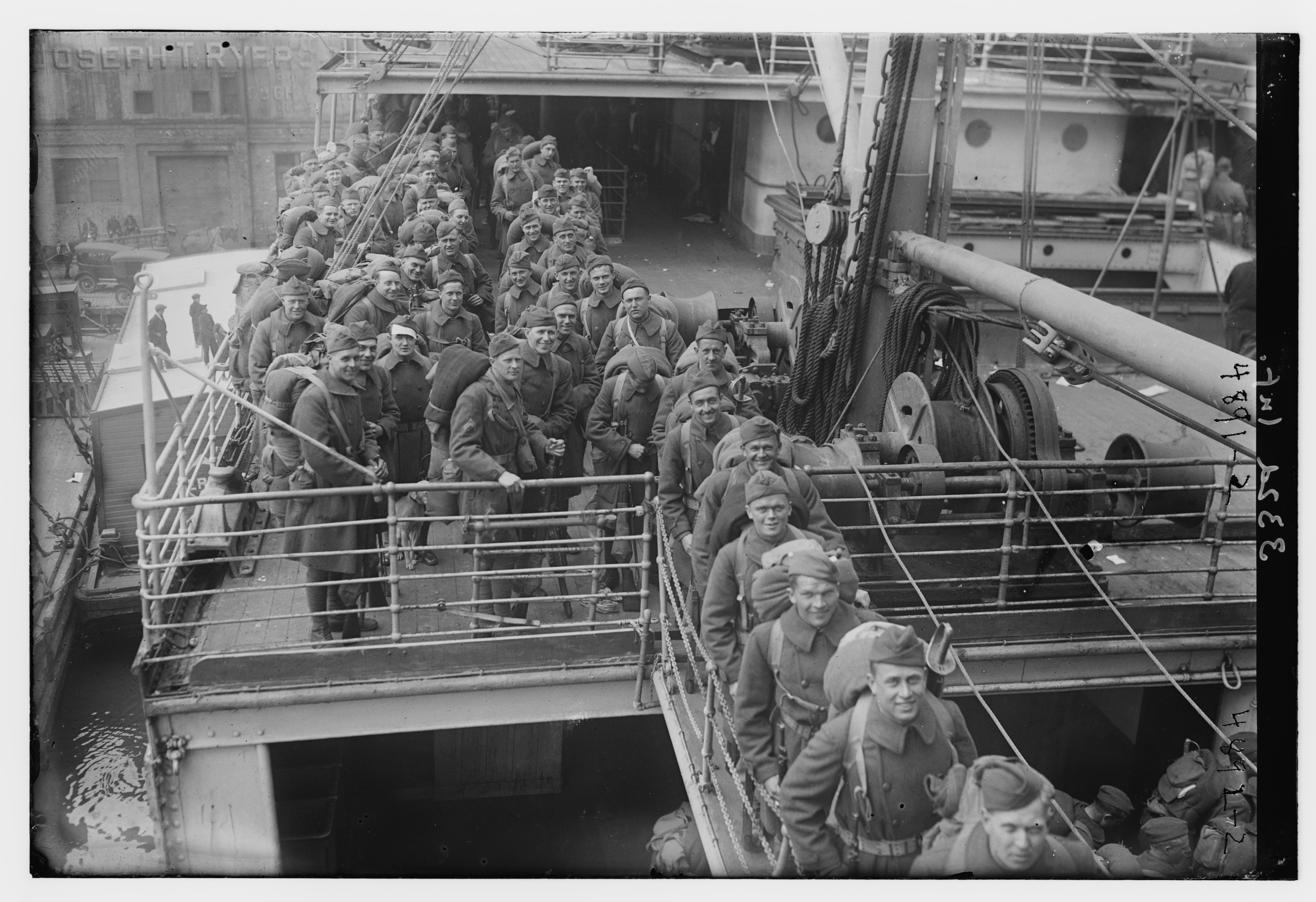
The 332nd Infantry Regiment, 1919.

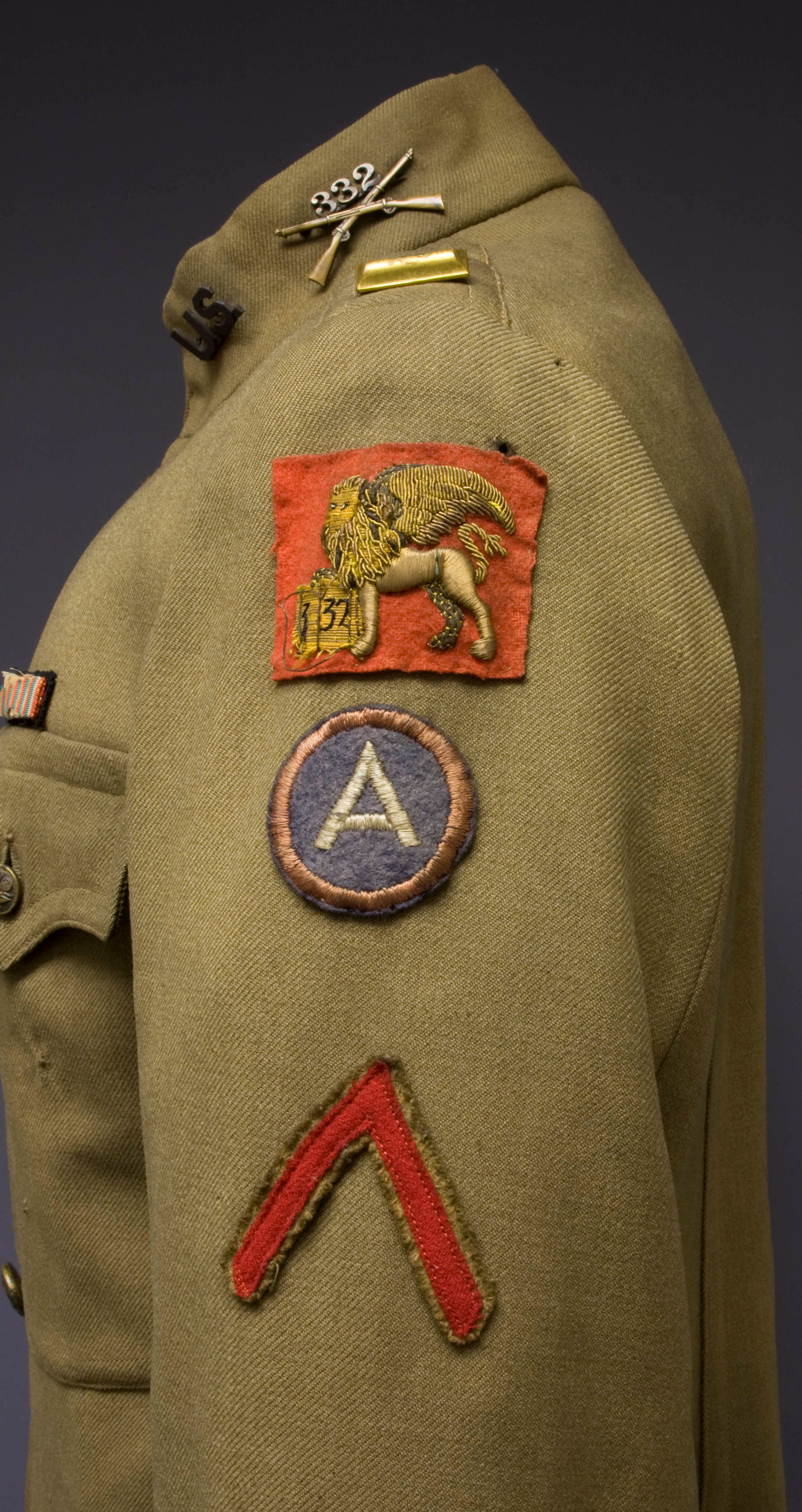
Detail of a Lieutenant’s uniform from the regiment showing the famous 332nd Infantry Regiment Lion of Saint Mark, and Army of Occupation shoulder sleeve insignia. Courtesy United States Army Center of Military History.

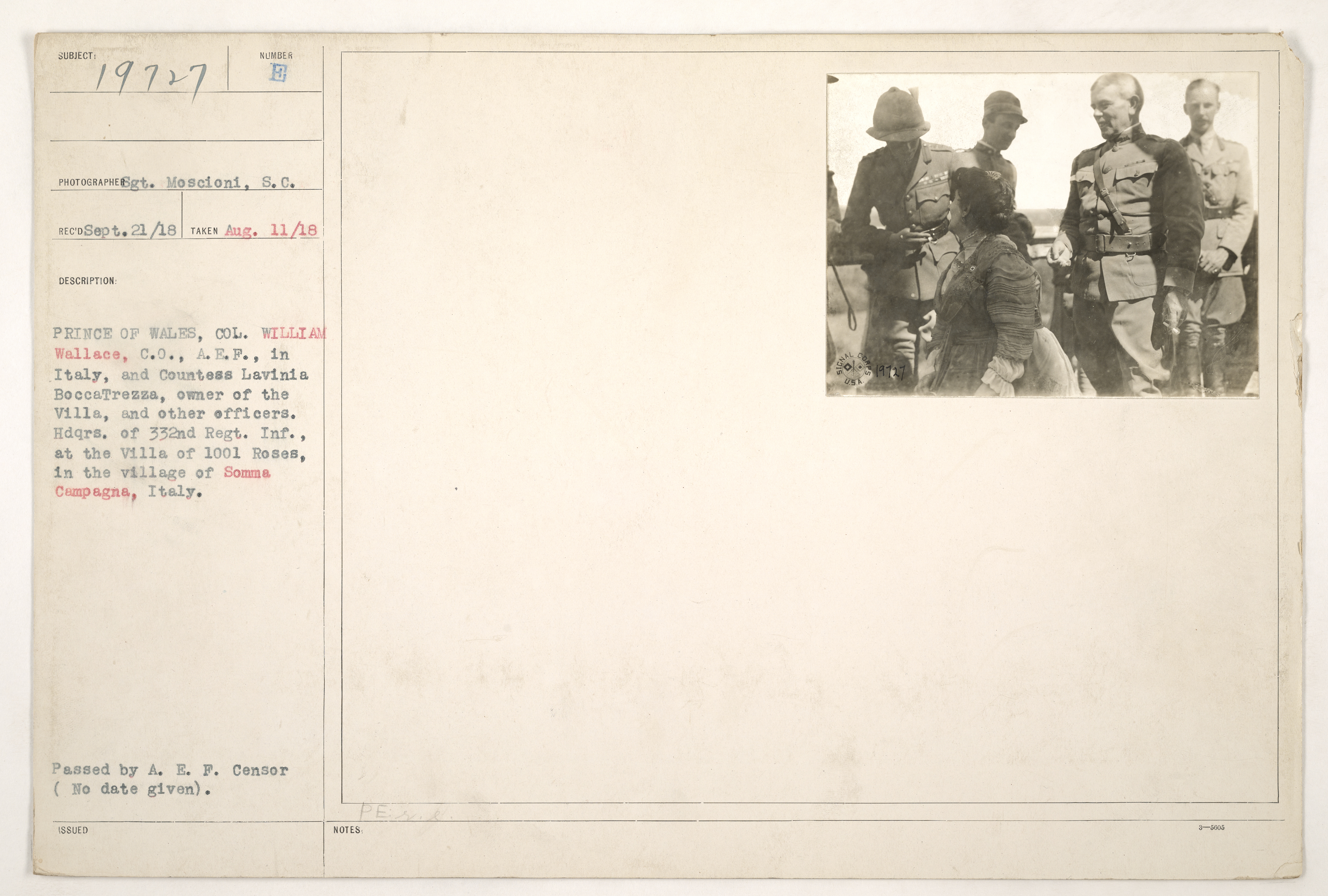
