= John Englund =

American newspaper editor and politician

John Englund (March 20, 1873 – October 4, 1948) was an American newspaper editor and politician.

== Biography ==
Born in Glenwood, Minnesota, Englund moved with his parents to Hancock, Minnesota. Shortly after that, Englund's parents died and Englund and his siblings were sent to an orphanage in Wittenberg, Wisconsin. Englund learned the printer's trade. Englund joined the International Typographical Union and worked in newspapers offices in Saint Paul, Minnesota between 1895 and 1897. He also went to St. Olaf College, in Northfield, Minnesota. Englund returned to Wittenberg, Wisconsin, as foreman of the Orphan House printing establishment. Englund then became owner and manager of the Wittenberg Enterprise newspaper. From 1925 to 1929, Englund served in the Wisconsin State Senate as a Republican. He also served as Wittenberg village clerk. Englund died in Wittenberg, Wisconsin after a long illness.
