= Wittenberg, Wisconsin =

- Village
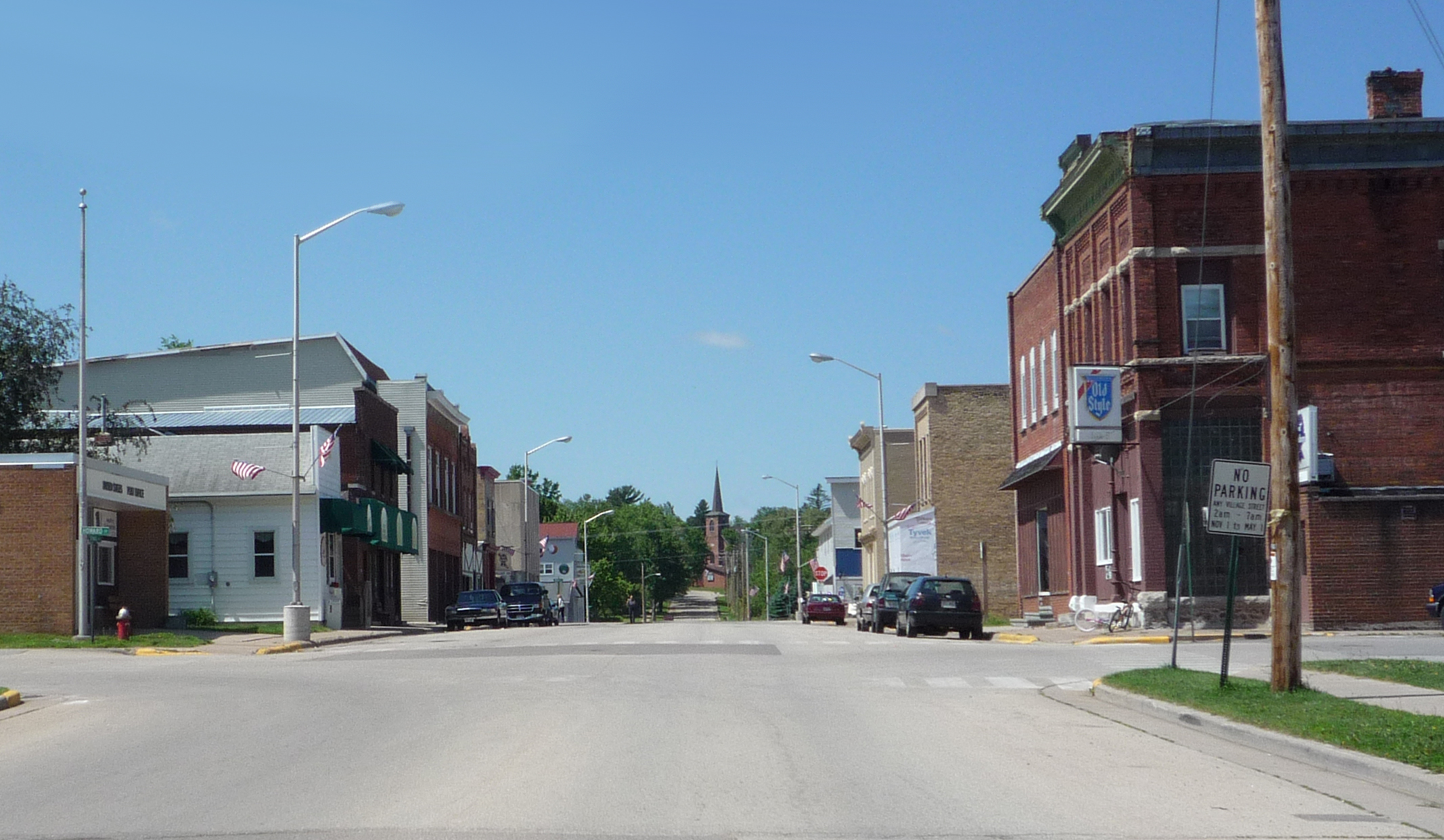
- Wittenberg

- Location of Wittenberg in Shawano County, Wisconsin.
- Coordinates: 44°49′24″N 89°9′25″W
- Country: United States
- State: Wisconsin
- County: Shawano

Area
  - Total: 1.81 sq mi (4.69 km^{2})
  - Land: 1.81 sq mi (4.69 km^{2})
  - Water: 0 sq mi (0.00 km^{2})
- Elevation: 873 ft (266 m)

Population (2020)
  - Total: 1,015
  - Density: 561/sq mi (216/km^{2})
- Time zone: UTC-6 (Central (CST))
  - Summer (DST): UTC-5 (CDT)
- ZIP code: 54499-9033
- Area codes: 715 & 534
- FIPS code: 55-88350
- GNIS feature ID: 1576924
- Website: https://www.villageofwittenberg.com/

Wittenberg is a village in Shawano County, Wisconsin, United States. The population was 1,015 at the 2020 census. The village is located within the Town of Wittenberg.

== History ==
In 1886, the Wittenberg Indian School was established by the Norwegian Evangelical Church of America after a purchase of land in Winnebago traditional territory. This was a residential school for Native American children who the government removed from their families as part of an effort to assimilate Native Americans into white American culture. It was also known as the Bethany Indian Mission. Initial attempts to recruit students for the school were met with resistance, particularly from Winnebago "medicine men" who the missionaries believed were concerned about their intention to convert the children to Christianity. The school initially only taught a few children but eventually expanded to include over a hundred students who came from the Winnebago, Oneida, Stockbridge, Brothertown, Menominee, Mohawk and Chippewa. The school was sold to the government in 1900 and operated until 1917, when it was closed because of the First World War. After the closure of the federal school, the mission continued educating Native children, eventually educating up to 140 students with only four members of staff, as well as baptizing hundreds of local Native people. The high student to staff ratio was typical of overcrowded Indian schools, as documented by the Merriam Report.

A post office called Wittenberg has been in operation since 1880. The village was named after Wittenberg in Germany.

== Geography ==
Wittenberg is located at 44°49′25″N 89°10′2″W (44.823795, -89.167328).

According to the United States Census Bureau, the village has a total area of 1.79 square miles (4.64 km^{2}), all land.

== Demographics ==
Historical population
Census	Pop.	Note	%±
1890	726		—
1900	798		9.9%
1910	1,090		36.6%
1920	854		−21.7%
1930	863		1.1%
1940	900		4.3%
1950	874		−2.9%
1960	892		2.1%
1970	895		0.3%
1980	997		11.4%
1990	1,145		14.8%
2000	1,177		2.8%
2010	1,081		−8.2%
2020	1,015		−6.1%
U.S. Decennial Census

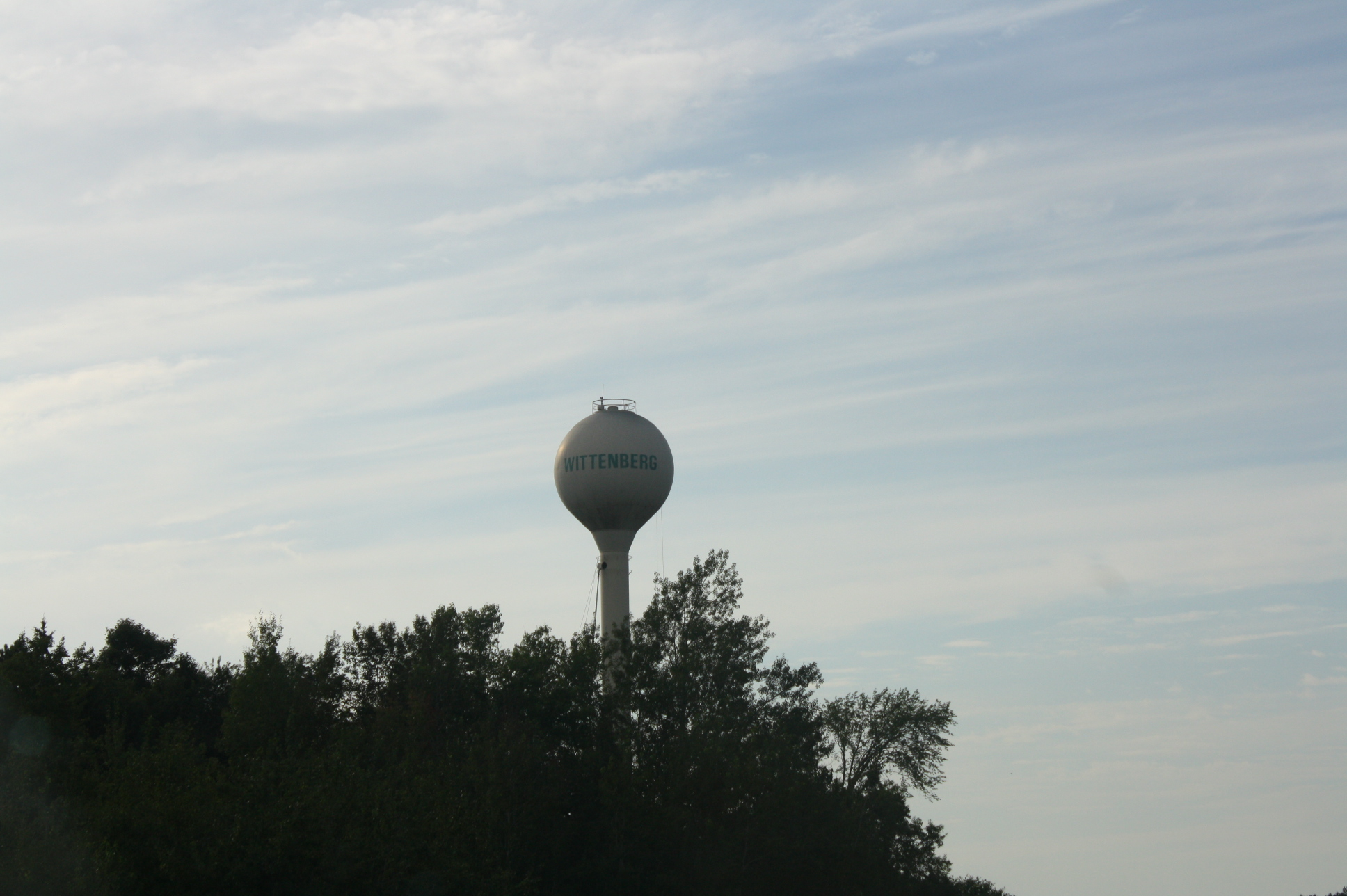
Water tower

=== 2010 census ===
As of the census of 2010, there were 1,081 people, 427 households, and 231 families living in the village. The population density was 603.9 inhabitants per square mile (233.2/km^{2}). There were 495 housing units at an average density of 276.5 per square mile (106.8/km^{2}). The racial makeup of the village was 89.3% White, 3.8% Native American, 0.2% Asian, 5.1% from other races, and 1.7% from two or more races. Hispanic or Latino of any race were 7.1% of the population.

There were 427 households, of which 29.0% had children under the age of 18 living with them, 35.6% were married couples living together, 13.3% had a female householder with no husband present, 5.2% had a male householder with no wife present, and 45.9% were non-families. 40.5% of all households were made up of individuals, and 18.5% had someone living alone who was 65 years of age or older. The average household size was 2.19 and the average family size was 2.94.

The median age in the village was 42.2 years. 22.7% of residents were under the age of 18; 8% were between the ages of 18 and 24; 22.6% were from 25 to 44; 21% were from 45 to 64; and 25.6% were 65 years of age or older. The gender makeup of the village was 46.6% male and 53.4% female.

=== 2000 census ===
As of the census of 2000, there were 1,177 people, 436 households, and 272 families living in the village. The population density was 718.2 people per square mile (277.1/km^{2}). There were 471 housing units at an average density of 287.4 per square mile (110.9/km^{2}). The racial makeup of the village was 96.52% White, 0.17% Black or African American, 2.21% Native American, 0.08% Asian, and 1.02% from two or more races. 0.25% of the population were Hispanic or Latino of any race.

There were 436 households, out of which 32.3% had children under the age of 18 living with them, 47.5% were married couples living together, 11.0% had a female householder with no husband present, and 37.6% were non-families. 33.3% of all households were made up of individuals, and 17.9% had someone living alone who was 65 years of age or older. The average household size was 2.37 and the average family size was 3.02.

In the village, the population was spread out, with 24.8% under the age of 18, 6.5% from 18 to 24, 24.7% from 25 to 44, 15.3% from 45 to 64, and 28.7% who were 65 years of age or older. The median age was 40 years. For every 100 females, there were 87.7 males. For every 100 females age 18 and over, there were 78.8 males.

The median income for a household in the village was $29,926, and the median income for a family was $40,074. Males had a median income of $28,571 versus $21,202 for females. The per capita income for the village was $17,695. About 9.2% of families and 12.9% of the population were below the poverty line, including 14.4% of those under age 18 and 10.4% of those age 65 or over.

== Economy ==
- Nueske's Applewood Smoked Meats

== Notable people ==
- John Englund, Wisconsin State Senator and newspaper editor, lived in Wittenberg.
- Helmer Swenholt, United States Army officer, was born in Wittenberg.
- Jonas Swenholt, Wisconsin State Representative and businessman, lived in Wittenberg.
