= 332nd Engineer General Service Regiment =

The 332nd Engineer General Service Regiment was a group in the United States Army that served during World War II. This unit became active on January 5th, 1943, directed to provide engineering assistance to the Allied forces in the European Theater of Operations. The regiment consisted of soldiers who received training in various engineering skills, including construction, road building, and mine clearance.

Throughout World War II, the Regiment played a role in significant battles. They were involved in events such as the Normandy invasion and the Liberation of Paris. Additionally, they contributed to the construction of the Mulberry harbours, which played a part in the invasion of Normandy.

Discrimination and segregation were experienced by its soldiers during and after the war. It wasn't until the 1990s that their accomplishments achieved full recognition and acknowledgement.

== Activation and training ==
This regiment was established on October 15th, 1942 at Camp Claiborne, Louisiana, as part of the army's American units.

As a unit specializing in engineering and construction work, the Regiment underwent training in aspects of building and road development. Initial training took place at Camp Claiborne until January 1943. Subsequently, they were relocated to Fort Devens in Massachusetts for instruction on construction techniques and road building.

== Deployment ==
After completing training, the Regiment was sent to the United Kingdom in 1944 as part of the European Theater of Operations. The Regiment arrived on March 22nd, 1944, and was stationed at various locations across the country to assist in the Allied war efforts.

Its main responsibilities included building and maintaining roads, bridges, airfields, and other essential infrastructure. In addition, they provided support to combat troops on June 6th, 1944, and throughout the advancement through France and Germany.

== Engineer group ==
The Regiment served as a unit within the 1185th Engineer Group. The activation of the Engineer Group took place on December 1st, 1942, at Fort Belvoir in Virginia. This activation was part of the United States Army's initiative to mobilize engineering and construction units for their war efforts.

The 1185th Engineer Group consisted primarily of soldiers and encompassed regiments such as the 97th Engineer General Service Regiment, and the 366th Engineer General Service Regiment. The group had responsibilities in engineering and construction tasks like constructing roads, bridges, airfields, and other essential infrastructure.

== Invasion of Normandy ==
The Regiment played a role in the invasion of Normandy.

== Railway bridge construction ==
The Regiment had a role in constructing railway bridges, including one over the Moselle River in France.
