= History of the United States Army National Guard =

US military formation's history

The history of the Army National Guard in the United States dates from 1636, when the Massachusetts Bay Colony's government organized existing militia companies into three regiments. The National Guard's history continued through the colonial era, including the French and Indian War, and extends into the modern era, with deployments for natural disasters, military objectives, and controlling civil unrest in the early decades of the 2000s.

== Founding ==
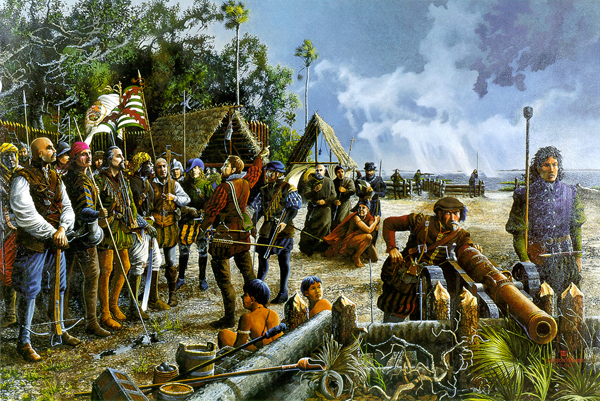
First militia muster in what is today the United States, 16 September 1565, St. Augustine, Florida

A militia was mustered in Spanish Florida in the 1500s, followed by creation of separate militia companies in towns around Boston. These militia were formed due to the perceived need to defend the Bay Colony against American Indians, and threats from other European countries operating in North America. These included the French in what is now Canada; the Spanish in what is now Florida, The Carolinas, and Georgia; and the Dutch in what was then New Netherland, which comprised what is now parts of New York, Connecticut, Rhode Island and Massachusetts.

A 13 December 1636, act of the Massachusetts Bay Colony's General Court called for the creation of three militia regiments from the existing town militias. It required all able-bodied men between ages 16 and 60, except judges and clergy members, be considered members of the colony's militia, which was organized as the North, South, and East Regiments. Militia members were required to equip themselves, take part in regular training, and report to their units when called. (The lineage of the North, South and East Regiments has been maintained in the 21st century by: 1st Squadron, 182nd Cavalry Regiment and 1st Battalion, 181st Infantry Regiment (North); 1st Battalion, 101st Field Artillery Regiment (South); and the 101st Engineer Battalion (East).)

== Early action ==
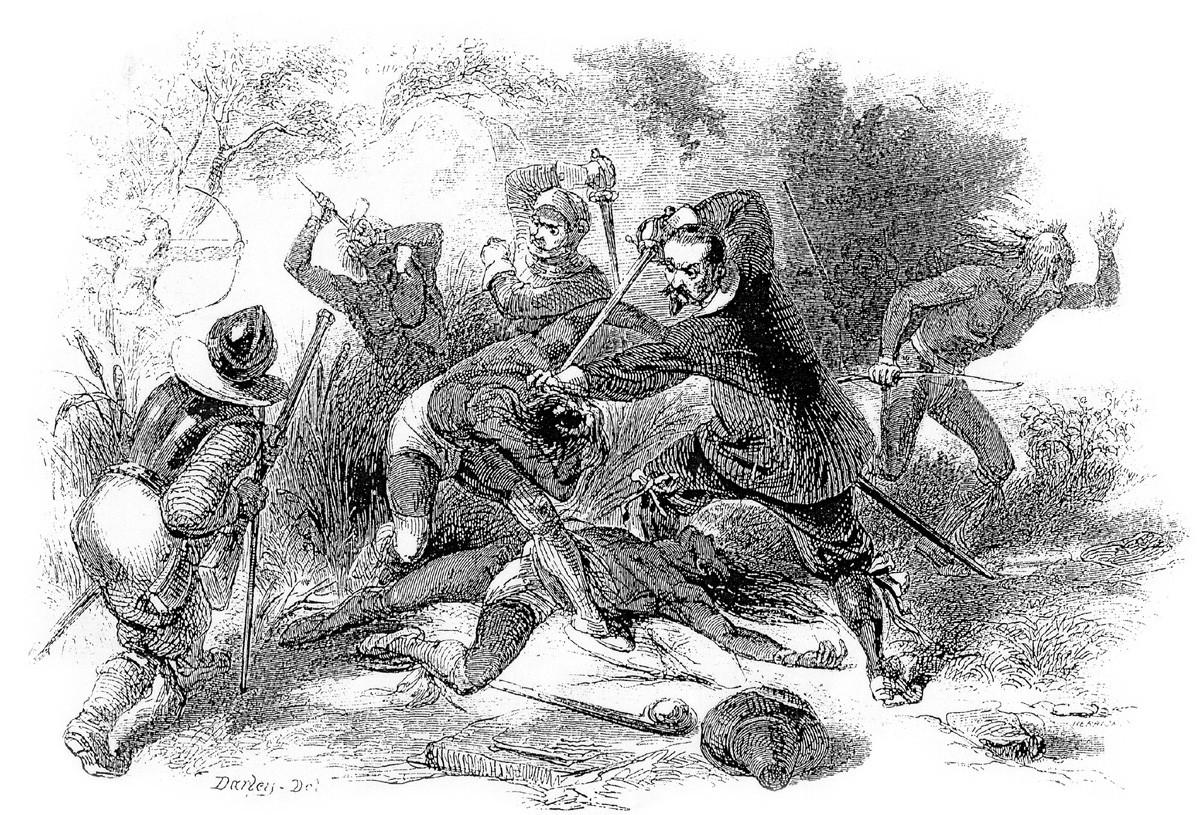
18th-century depiction of militia at the 1637 battle known as the Great Swamp Fight.

The militia of the Bay Colony, combined with militias from Plymouth and Saybrook and Native American allies from the Narragansett and Mohegan tribes, fought the Native Americans of Southern New England in the Pequot War (1634–1638). This war resulted in hundreds of deaths, hundreds of Native Americans sold into slavery or scattered throughout North America, and the destruction of the Pequots as a group. The militias of the Southern New England colonies fought Native Americans again in King Philip's War from 1675 to 1676. This conflict led to the decisive defeat of the Narragansets, further straining relationships between Native Americans and white settlers, but enabling continued white settlement of New England.

The American colonists maintained their militias in the late 1600s and 1700s, preferring the militia to a standing army as the result of English resistance to a standing army, when Oliver Cromwell established a military dictatorship during the First English Civil War. In addition, the colonists had little interest in paying the taxes to maintain permanent garrisons of regular troops. The militias were also an early experiment in democracy, with company grade officers often elected by their men, and the higher officers appointed by colonial governors or legislatures. The colonies did not exert centralized control over the militias or coordinate their efforts. Training typically took place during musters each summer, with militia members reporting for inspection and undergoing several days of training in drill and ceremony.

== French and Indian War ==
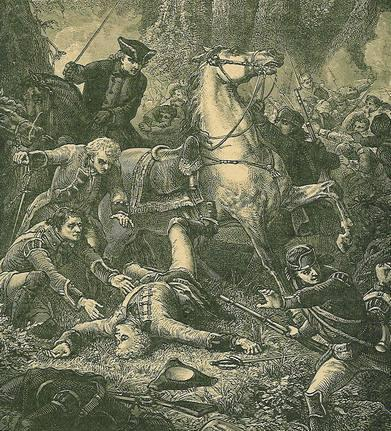
Death of Braddock at Battle of the Monongahela. 19th-century engraving.

During the French and Indian War (1754-1763), militias from several British colonies took part in various actions, including:

- Robert Dinwiddie dispatching Virginia militia, (most notably George Washington) to French outposts in the Ohio Country
- The Braddock Expedition
- Fort William Henry
- Siege of Louisbourg
- Battle of Quebec.

Many American commanders who served in the American Revolutionary War had military experience in the French and Indian War, including Washington, Israel Putnam, Daniel Morgan, Adam Stephen, Daniel Boone, Philip Schuyler, John Stark, and John Thomas.

== American Revolution ==
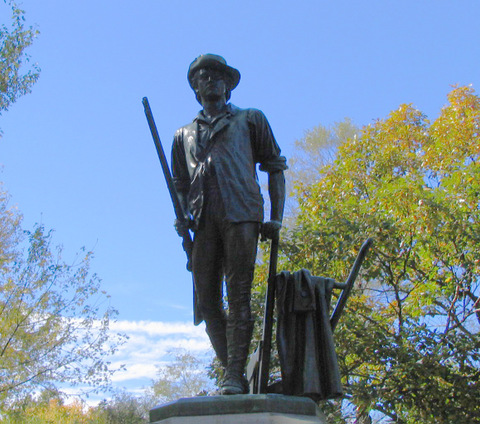
The minuteman with a plow, sculpted by Daniel Chester French and located in Concord, Massachusetts, is incorporated into the seal of the Army National Guard.

When tensions escalated between the British government and the American colonists in the 1760s and 1770s, many citizens began organizing, equipping and training private militia units, in order to have bodies of troops that were outside the control of the royal governors.

Militia members served throughout the Revolution, often near their homes, and frequently for short periods. Militia units served in combat, as well as carrying out guard duty for prisoners, garrisoning of forts, and local patrols.

On some occasions, militia members performed ineffectively, as at the Battle of Camden in North Carolina. On other occasions they performed capably, including the Battles of Lexington and Concord, Battle of Bunker Hill, Battle of Bennington, Battles of Saratoga, and Battle of Cowpens.

Perhaps the most important role played by the militia was off the battlefield, by affecting the course of the political debate. Militia with Patriot sympathies were well established, particularly in the Mid-Atlantic and New England colonies, causing the British Army to concentrate their forces into larger, more defensible garrisons. With the countryside in the hands of the Patriot militia, neutrals or Loyalists gradually either fled to British garrisons (and from there, often to Canada) or became more accepting of the Patriot goal of independence from Great Britain.

== Post Revolutionary War ==
During the period of the Articles of Confederation, the weak federal government reduced the Continental Army to a handful of officers and soldiers. The Articles of Confederation required each state to maintain a militia, and allowed the Confederation Congress to form a standing army only with the consent of nine of the thirteen states. Such consent was not forthcoming in an era when the population still harbored a distrust of a standing army, so Congress largely left the defense of the new nation to the state militias.

== Constitutional Convention ==
During the Constitutional Convention in 1787, Federalist delegates argued for a powerful federal government, including federal control of the militia. Federalists anticipated using the military to defend the country if it were attacked, and to enforce federal laws when required.

Anti-Federalists advocated limited federal government, and wanted continued state control over the militias. Anti-Federalists based their arguments on three points. First, the militia could be available to the federal government to resist foreign invasions. Second, the militia served as a police force in each state, enabling it to maintain order and respect for the law. Third, once the new federal government replaced the one under the Articles of Confederation, the militia would be the last defense of the states in the event that a standing army raised by the federal government was employed against the states.

The compromise agreed to by both sides satisfied Anti-Federalists because there was no standing Army, and the militias remained the responsibility of the states, especially the appointment of officers. It satisfied the Federalists because it provided that the militia could be federalized when circumstances required it.

== Militia Acts of 1792 ==
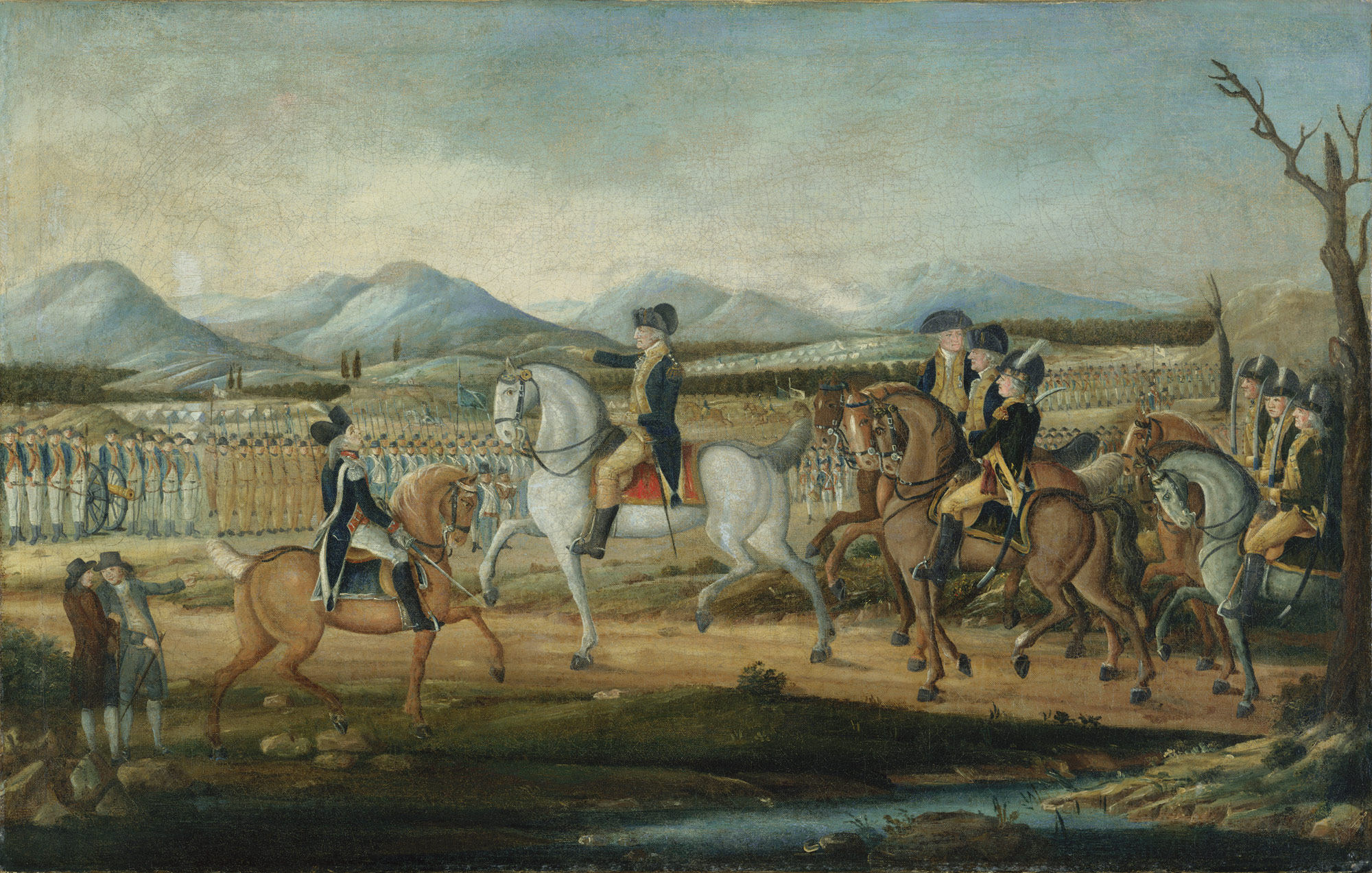
Washington reviews regular Army and militia troops at Ft. Cumberland, Maryland before marching to suppress Whiskey Rebellion

The compromise between Federalists and Anti-federalists proved short-lived. In 1791 Arthur St. Clair suffered a major defeat in the Battle of the Wabash while fighting American Indians in the Northwest Territory. In response, Congress authorized the expansion of the army, and allowed for the president to call up the state militias on his own authority if circumstances required it when Congress was not in session.

The First Militia Act of 1792 allowed the president to call up the militias in the event of a foreign invasion, in response to attacks by American Indians, and when required for the enforcement of federal law.

The Second Militia Act of 1792 formalized the organization and training requirements of the state militias. It mandated that the militia consisted of every "free able-bodied white male citizen" between ages 18 and 45, organized as members of a local unit. (A later change expanded eligibility to all men between 18 and 54, regardless of race.) Some occupations were exempt, including stagecoach drivers and ferry operators, who would be expected to support the militia by facilitating the transport of soldiers, supplies and equipment in the event of a mobilization. There were also religious exemptions for Quakers and other denominations that advocated nonviolence.

Militia units were required to report for training twice a year, usually in early summer (after spring planting) and late fall (after the autumn harvest but before snow fell). Militia members were required to outfit themselves and report for training or mobilization with a musket or rifle, bayonet, flints, cartridge box, bullets or musket balls, haversack or knapsack, and powder horn and gunpowder.

State legislatures were authorized to organize local units into divisions, regiments and subordinate commands, and federalized militia members were made subject to court martial proceedings for disobeying orders and other offenses.

Part of this reorganization included removing state governors as commanders with military rank (Captain General), and the creation of the state Adjutant General. The Adjutant General reported directly to the governor and served as commander of the state militia. States were slow to respond, and some did not begin appointing Adjutants General until after the War of 1812.

President George Washington used the authority of the Second Act in 1794 to call up the militia in response to the Whiskey Rebellion. He did so shortly before that provision of the Second Act was about to expire. Recognizing that the authority might be needed again in the future, Congress responded by passing the Militia Act of 1795, which made permanent the President's ability to call up the militia on his own authority if Congress was not in session.

The use of the militia in the Whiskey Rebellion made clear that at that point, militias were not well organized, effectively trained, or capably led. Washington and other Federalists advocated the creation of a national military academy to standardize training and increase the number of citizens with military experience, and in 1802, the Army established the United States Military Academy at West Point.

== War of 1812 ==
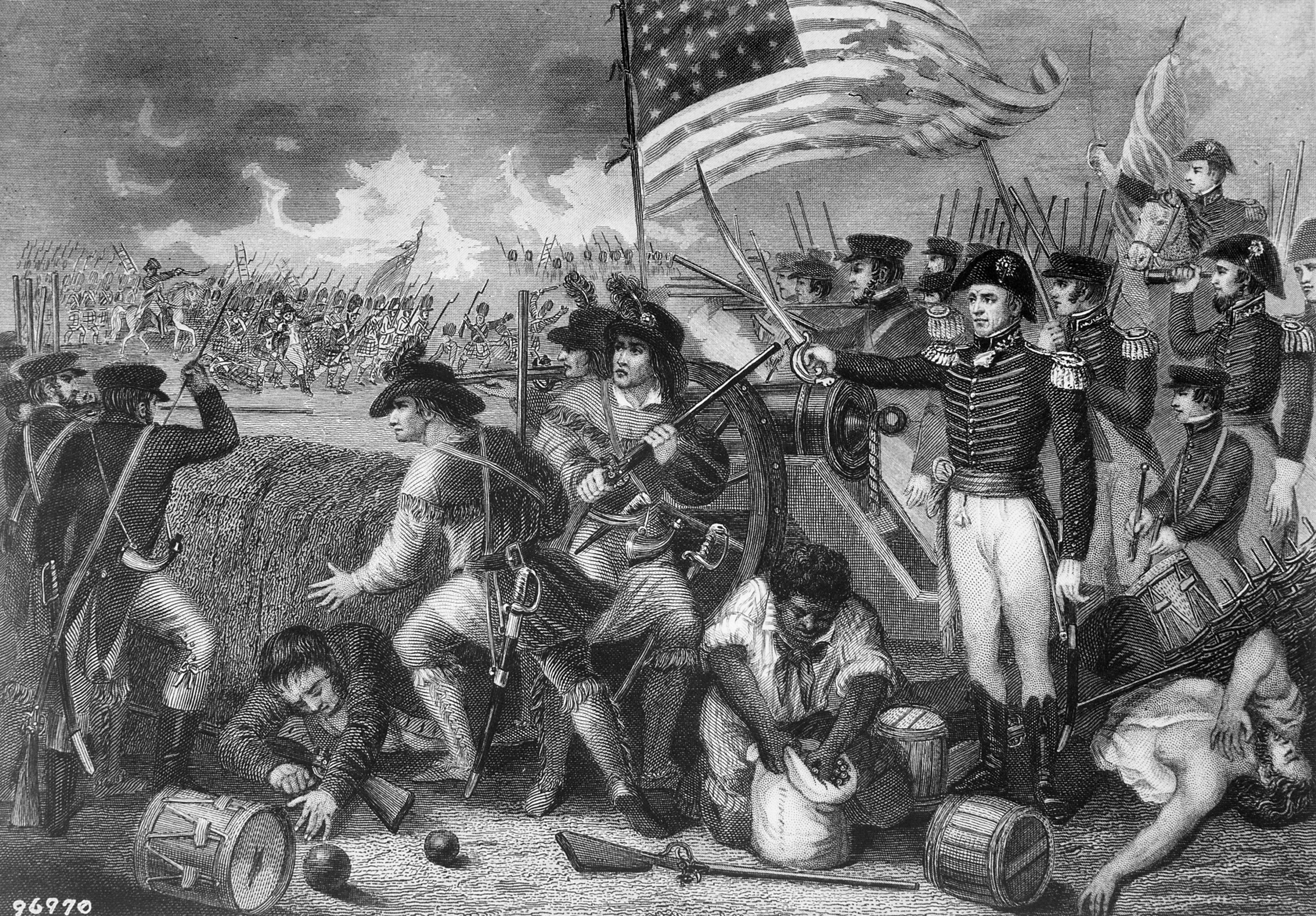
Artist depiction of Battle of New Orleans, including militia.

At the start of the War of 1812 the regular army totaled less than 12,000 soldiers. Congress authorized expanding the army to 35,000, but recruiting was only moderately successful because of poor pay and a lack of trained leaders. In addition, war with Britain was less popular in some areas of the country than others, which made it difficult to convince men to enlist. For example, in Vermont residents saw little need to invade Canada, which was a profitable trading partner.

Both regular and hastily organized militias took part in battles throughout the war, with mixed results. For example, the militia fled during the Battle of Bladensburg, giving rise to the description of the event as the "Bladensburg races." On the other hand, less than three weeks later the Maryland militia won a strategic victory at the Battle of North Point. Alexander Macomb also led a successful action at Plattsburgh, with his small force of regulars and militia repulsing a British attempt to invade upstate New York from Canada. In addition, Andrew Jackson employed militia effectively at the Battle of New Orleans.

In some cases militia members objected to serving outside their home states, arguing that since they were responsible to their state governors and not the federal government, they were not required to serve in other states or take part in invasions. Also, some state governors attempted to prevent their militias from being federalized, since they did not support the war. (The 1827 decision in the case of Martin v. Mott determined that individual militia soldiers could not use the courts to interfere with the president's authority to call upon the militia to execute federal law, suppress insurrection and repel invasion. Jacob Mott, a New York militia member, refused James Madison's order to mobilize and refused to pay the fine levied by a subsequent court-martial. William Martin, a United States Marshal, then seized Mott's property, intending to sell it to satisfy the fine. Mott sued to recover his property and won in state court. Martin then took the case to the United States Supreme Court and prevailed.) According to Professor Joshua Kastenberg at the University of New Mexico, School of Law, the Court, in Martin v. Mott, solidified a presidential authority to determine when an emergency such as an invasion or insurrection existed, but did not stand for the sweep of power that later proponents of the unitary executive theory have argued the decision to stand for. This was because the Court did not do away with the pre-Civil War practice of militia soldiers seeking a legal remedy in the state courts on other claims of legal wrongs committed by the executive branch.

One result of the uneven performance of the militia, the lingering uncertainty over the willingness of militia troops to fight for causes that were unpopular locally, and the unresolved question of state versus federal control of the militia, was that the federal government was wary of attempting to federalize the militia during future conflicts.

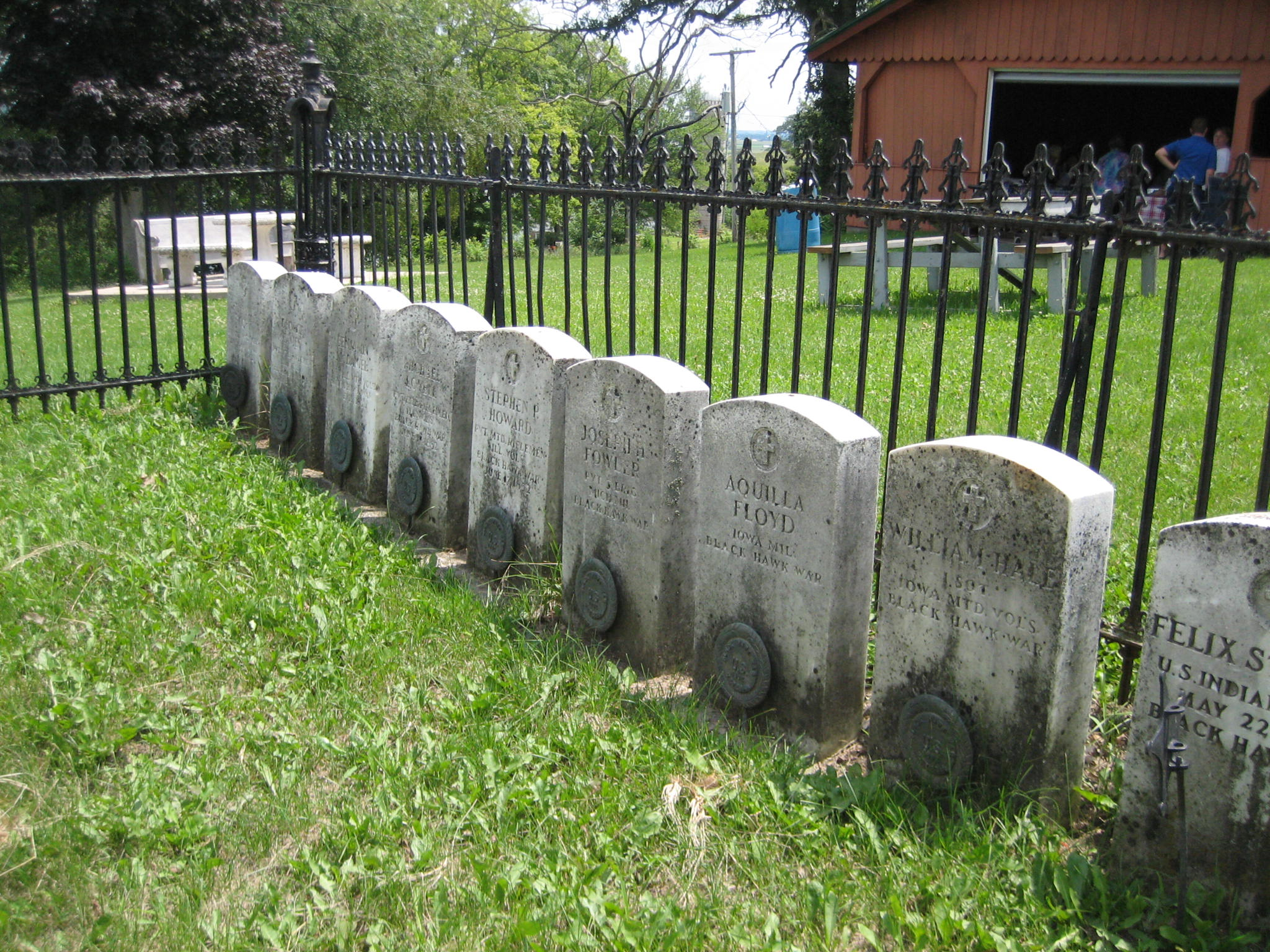
Graves of militia members who died at Kellogg's Grove during the Black Hawk War.

== Post War of 1812 ==
In the wake of the War of 1812, the federal government attempted to standardize training and laws governing call up and mobilization for militia organizations throughout the United States.

These efforts to reenergize the militia lapsed as the result of the long period of relative peace that followed the War of 1812. (The Era of Good Feelings.) The number of occupations exempt from membership increased, and annual muster days became more picnic and parade than military formation. These factors, coupled with a lack of military leaders with training and experience, led to a gradual decline of the militia.

Despite this decline, the militia was still called to action on occasion, including the Black Hawk War of 1832.

== Origin of term "National Guard" ==
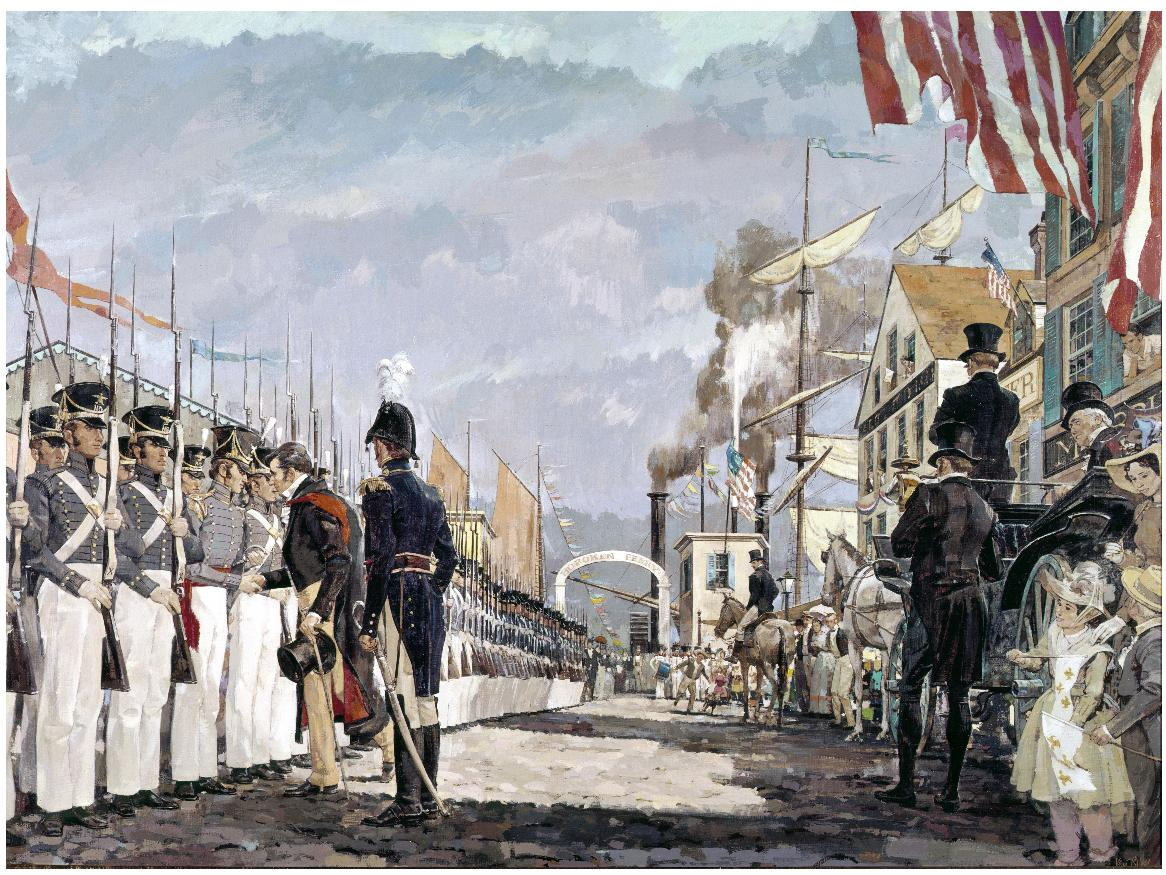
Lafayette and the Naming of the National Guard, New York City, 14 July 1825. National Guard Heritage Series painting by Ken Riley.

The first use of the term "National Guard" by American militia units dates from Lafayette's 1824–1825 tour of the United States. The 2nd Battalion of the 11th New York Artillery – which later became New York's famed 7th Regiment – was one of the units that welcomed Lafayette to New York City, and it adopted the title "National Guard" in honor of Lafayette's service as commander of the Garde Nationale de Paris during the French Revolution. During a review of militia units Lafayette took note of the term, and as it grew in popularity it was adopted by many militia units in the years that followed.

== Mexican–American War ==
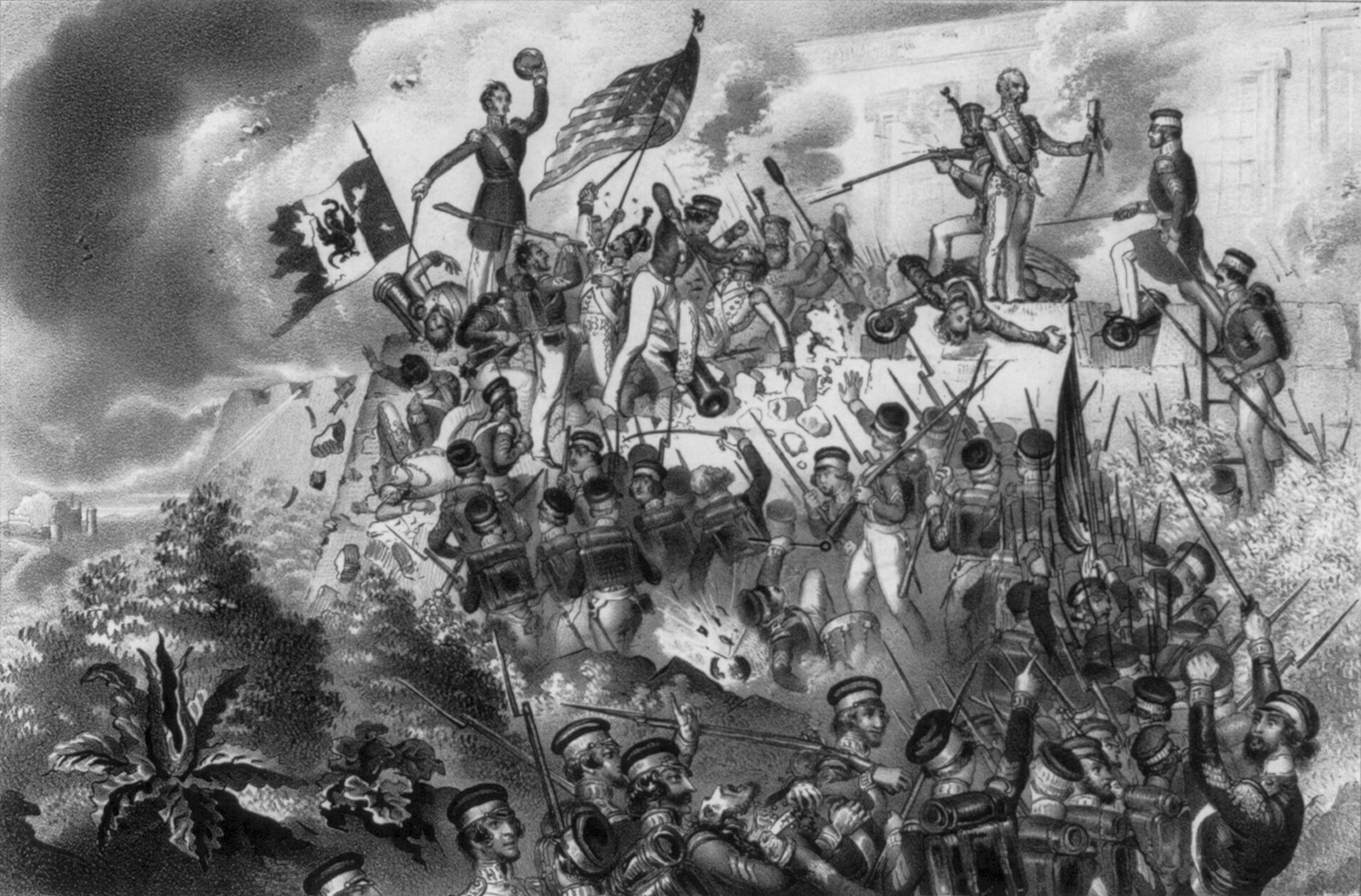
Artist rendition of Battle Chapultepec. Militia veteran and volunteer officer Truman B. Ransom died in attack while commanding his regiment.

In the United States in the mid-1840s, war with Mexico had the support of Southern Democrats and their allies in the north, who were anxious to annex Texas and gain states that would permit slavery, while Northern Whigs and anti-slavery Democrats generally opposed the war because they did not support the extension of slavery. At the start of the war, the Army consisted of between 8,000 and 9,000 soldiers. Enthusiasm for the war, primarily in the south, spurred renewed interest in the militia, and membership began to grow.

The regular Army did not consider militia members to be reliable, and the issue of whether militia units could be employed outside the United States had not been resolved. As a result, Congress expanded the Army by authorizing the creation of ten regiments and the recruiting of 50,000 "volunteers"—individuals who were not in the regular Army and were not militia members subject to state control. In many cases, militia units volunteered for federal service en masse, and usually continued to be led by their militia officers.

In the war, approximately 27,000 regular Army soldiers saw active service, as did an estimated 73,000 volunteers and militiamen.

Mexican–American War participants who were militia veterans included: Franklin Pierce; Jefferson Davis; Truman B. Ransom; Alexander Doniphan; and Gideon Johnson Pillow.

== American Civil War ==
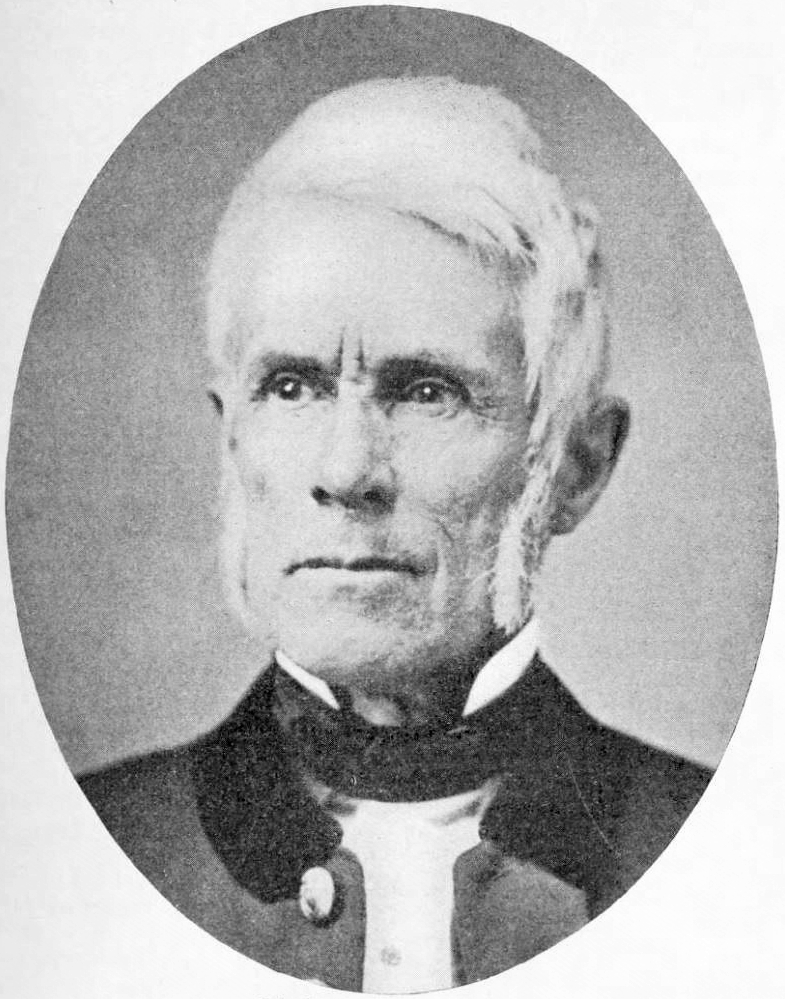
Alonzo Jackman, Vermont and New Hampshire drillmaster commanded militia on Vermont border after Confederate Raid on St. Albans.

Both the Union and the Confederacy made use of their militias during the American Civil War.

President Lincoln summoned 75,000 militia on 15 April 1861 to suppress the insurrection, a call which was limited by law to 90 days and which was rejected by several slaveholding states which had not seceded. In May 1861, Lincoln put out a call for more militia as well as volunteers who would be willing to serve for three years. The Union's July 1861 advance on Manassas, which resulted in defeat at the First Battle of Bull Run was due in large part to the fast-approaching expiration of the initial 90-day militia call-up—the Lincoln administration and Union Army leaders wanted to employ them before they mustered out. The resulting Union loss occurred at the hands of a Confederate force which was also principally composed of militia.

The Union used a version of the Mexican–American War-era volunteer system to expand the size of the Union Army while avoiding the restrictions on how long the militia could be employed. Many militia units were enlisted en masse, and many individuals who enlisted or received commissions in the Union Army were militia veterans.

State Adjutants General and the military staffs of the state governors in the Union were often responsible for equipping, training and transporting recruits and draftees to front line units. In addition, militias often garrisoned forts, performed local defense and border security patrols, and guarded prisoners. On several occasions, local militia became involved in larger battles, such as the Pennsylvania, New York and Rhode Island militia responding during the Gettysburg campaign, and the militia of several southern states during Sherman's March to the Sea.

The Confederate States Army also frequently enlisted militia unit members as a group, and many individuals who joined the CSA were militia veterans. The Confederate states also used their militias for local duty in much the same way as the Union.

Union veterans of the militia who had leadership roles during the war included George J. Stannard. Chester A. Arthur, who served on the staff of the Governor of New York as Quartermaster General with the rank of brigadier general, played a key role in outfitting New York soldiers and transporting them to the front lines.

Prominent Confederate militia veterans included Braxton Bragg, who was a colonel in the Louisiana Militia at the start of the war, and Sterling Price, who commanded the Missouri State Guard.

== Post American Civil War ==
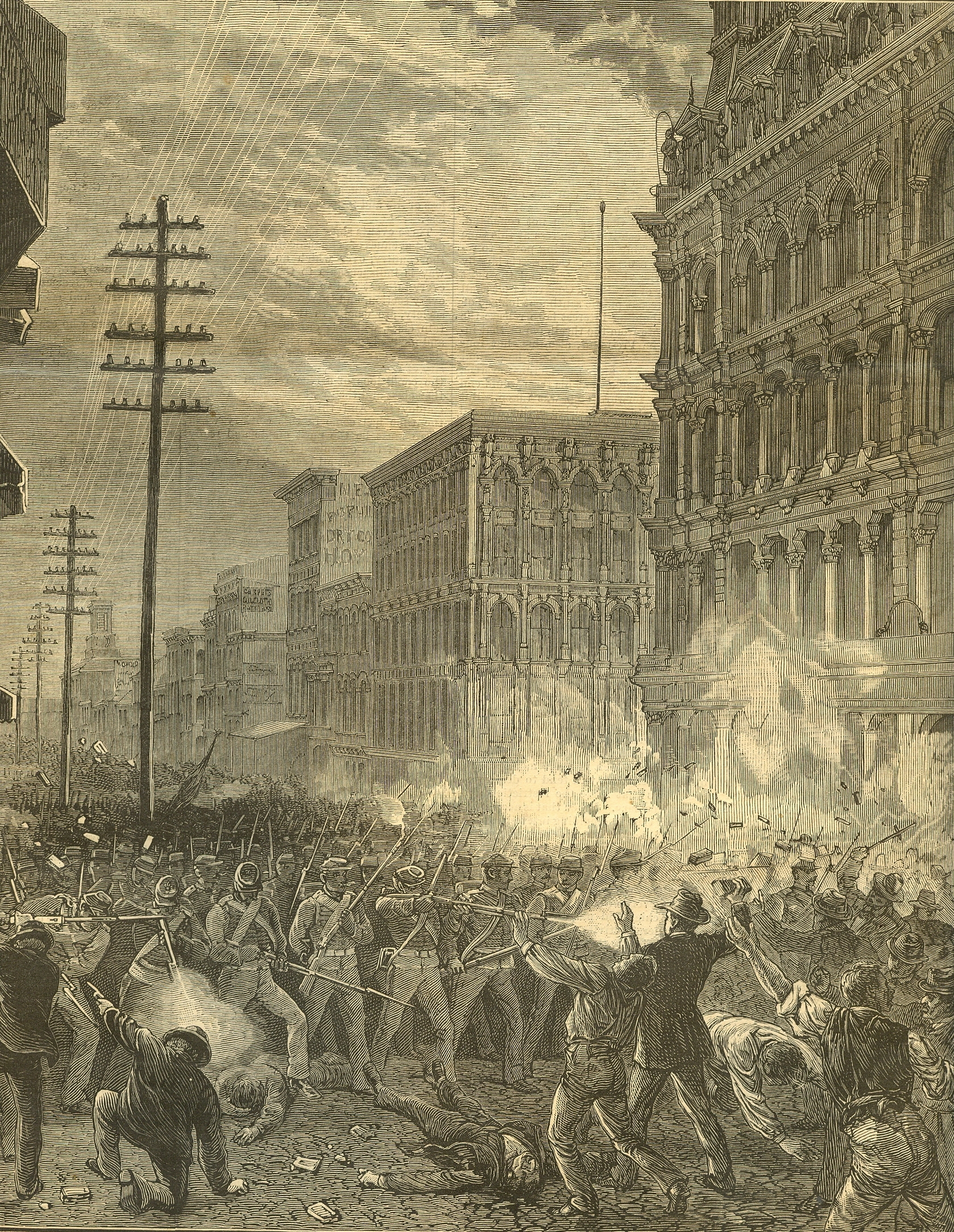
The 6th Regiment, Maryland National Guard fights its way through the city during the Baltimore railroad strike of 1877. From Harper's Weekly.

In 1867, Congress suspended the right of each former Confederate state to organize its militia until it resumed normal functions as part of the United States, and the U.S. Army enforced martial law during Reconstruction and guarded polls during the presidential election of 1876. In addition to enforcing federal law in the south, the Army was used to suppress labor unrest in the North, as during the Great Railroad Strike of 1877. In response Congress passed the Posse Comitatus Act in 1878, which limited the president's ability to employ the military within the United States during peacetime without the consent of Congress.

Governors could still employ the militia during labor strikes or civil disturbances, and concern over the militia's increased use for this function led states to revise their militia laws and reorganize their units in order to be better prepared to respond to such events.

== Expanded use of "National Guard" ==
In 1861, Connecticut was the first state to formally adopt the title "National Guard" for its militia, and the term became near universal following the Civil War. By the time the National Defense Act of 1916 mandated the use of "National Guard" as the title for all organized militia, only Virginia had not already adopted it.

== Spanish–American War ==
Soldiers of 71st Infantry Regiment, New York National Guard, at Camp Wikoff, 1898.

In the Spanish–American War, the U.S. government again used the volunteer concept to expand the Army without directly addressing the question of when militia could be federalized. As had happened previously, there were militia units that volunteered and were enlisted en masse, as well as individual militia members who joined volunteer units. Examples of the units that volunteered as a group include the 69th New York Infantry and the 71st New York Infantry.

The most famous organization of volunteers to fight in the war, the 1st U.S. Volunteer Cavalry, or "Rough Riders", was organized in part from the New Mexico and Arizona National Guards. Originally commanded by regular Army officer Leonard Wood with former New York National Guardsman Theodore Roosevelt as second in command, it came under Roosevelt's leadership when Wood was promoted to command of a brigade.

== The Dick Act ==
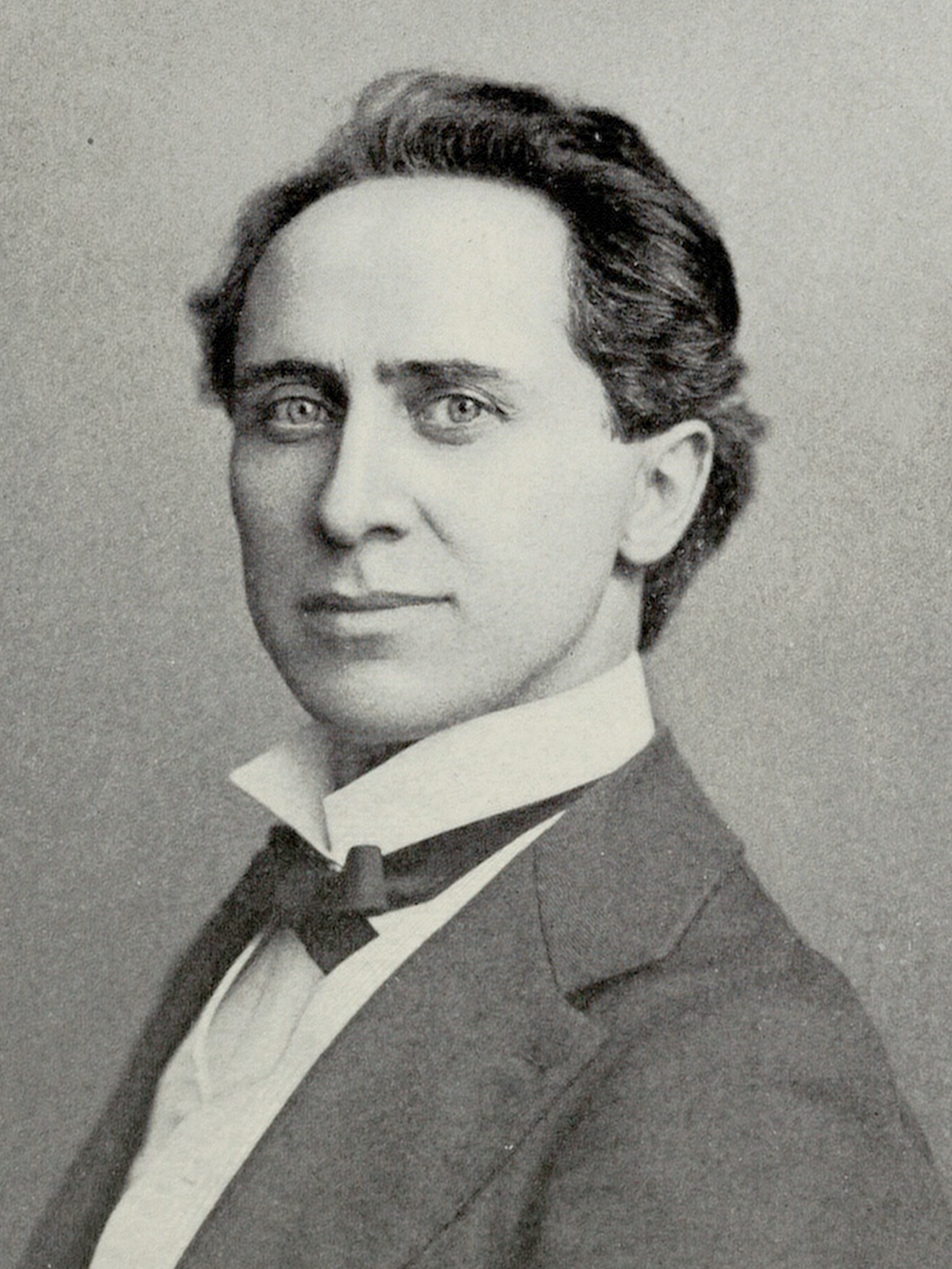
Charles Dick, sponsor of Militia Act of 1903.

The official founding of the modern Army National Guard is often credited to passage of the Militia Act of 1903, which established a pattern that would continue throughout the 20th century of providing increasing federal resources and wartime relevance for the militia in return for increasing federal control over their arming, organization and training. Also called the Dick Act, for sponsor Charles W. F. Dick, the 1903 law updated the Militia Act of 1792, though it left unresolved the key question of how to compel service of the militia outside the borders of the United States, which did not fall under the constitutionally permitted uses of the militia "to execute the laws of the Union, suppress insurrection and repel invasions."

This fundamental restriction on the use of the militia had been an unresolved dilemma for military planners since the War of 1812. This uncertainty led the federal government to bypass the state militias in favor of creating volunteer armies, as was done for the Mexican–American War, the Union Army of the American Civil War, and the U.S. forces raised for the Spanish–American War – though, in each of these cases, the volunteer forces raised came largely from already existing militia companies. While the Dick Act did not compel the militia to serve overseas, the expectation was that the increase in federal funding and training would spur increased volunteerism by militia members in the event of a war.

The Dick Act provided that states which wished to receive federal funding for their militia units had to organize their units according to standards dictated by the regular Army, and that National Guard members would have to meet the same training, education and readiness standards as their regular Army counterparts. In exchange, the federal government provided states with funding and equipment to enable militia reorganization and modernization, as well as training by regular Army officers should a governor request it. The Dick Act required that all members of National Guard units attend 24 four-hour drill periods during the course of each year (which were not paid for by the federal government) as well as five days of training at summer encampments (for which the federal government provided pay at the same rate as for soldiers in the regular Army).

The Dick Act also authorized creation of an office to oversee and coordinate the activities of the state militias. In response, the Army created the Militia Section within the Miscellaneous Division of the Adjutant General's office, staffed by Major James Parker and four clerks. This office became the Division of Militia Affairs in 1908, and Erasmus M. Weaver, Jr. was named to head it.

== National Defense Act of 1916 ==
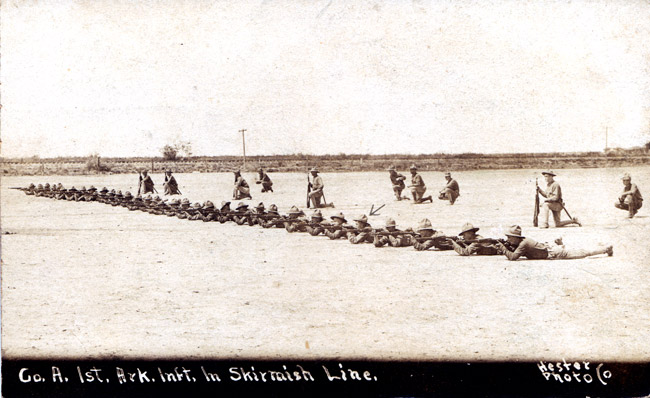
Co. A, 1st Arkansas Infantry, Deming, New Mexico, 1916.

Passed as part of the Preparedness Movement during and after the Villa expedition and before U.S. entry into World War I, the 1916 law named the state militias as the Army's primary reserve. The law also created a mechanism for mobilization of the National Guard for service outside the borders of the U.S. by stating that members of the militia would be discharged from the militia and drafted into the Volunteer Army (a term in the act which meant those men drafted into the service of the Army) in the event of an emergency, thus severing their tie to the states and the Constitutional restrictions placed on domestic usage of the state militia. Officers and men were also required to swear an oath to serve both state and federal authorities. In addition, the law made mandatory the use of the term "National Guard" to describe the organized militia, and provided funding to pay members for attending drill. The act also increased the number of weekend or weeknight drills from 24 to 48 per year, and increased the annual training period from five days to 15. Federal funding of all aspects of the National Guard expanded dramatically as a result of this legislation, with the federal government taking over all arming, equipping and training expenses associated with the Guard, sharing only administrative and armory costs with the states. Prior to 1916, the states in aggregate spent more on the militia than the federal government. Since 1916, federal expenditures have far outpaced those of the states.

The 1916 law also created the Reserve Officers' Training Corps.

The 1916 Act also reorganized the Division of Militia Affairs within the Army as the Militia Bureau, removing it from the General Staff and elevating it to a position directly under the Secretary of War. It also authorized the two members of the National Guard to serve on active duty as assistants to the Chief of the Militia Bureau, the first National Guardsmen to be authorized to serve as members of the Army staff.

== Pancho Villa Expedition ==
Numerous National Guard units were activated for service on the Mexico–United States border during the Pancho Villa Expedition. Many future leaders of both the National Guard and regular Army served in the National Guard during this event, including: John F. O'Ryan; Albert H. Blanding; Samuel Tankersley Williams; John Howell Collier; Milton Reckord; and Ellard A. Walsh.

== World War I ==
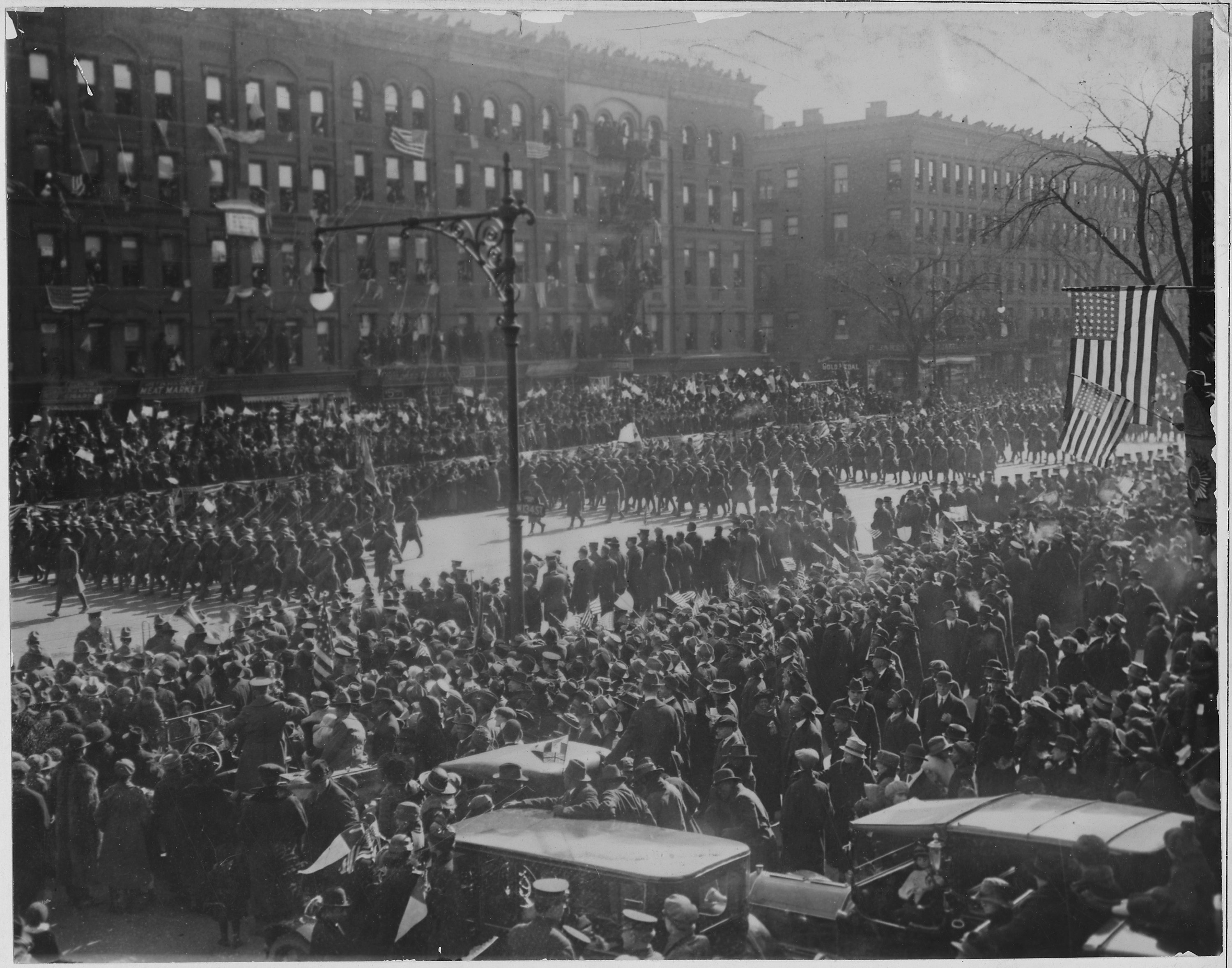
369th Infantry, first New York regiment to parade on return home at end of World War I.

In the spring of 1917, the U.S. declared war on Germany and entered World War I, and the National Guard played a major role. Its units were federalized and organized into divisions by state, which made up 40% of American Expeditionary Forces combat strength. Three of the first five U.S. Army divisions in combat were National Guard divisions, and the division with the highest number of Medal of Honor recipients was the National Guard's 30th Division. Six of the eight U.S. divisions rated "superior" or "excellent" by the German General Staff during the war were National Guard divisions.

National Guard divisions in World War I included the: 26th; 27th; 28th; 29th; 30th; 31st; 32nd; 33rd; 34th; 35th; 36th; 37th; 38th; 39th; 40th; 41st; and 42nd. Most divisions initially came from one state or region, but the 42nd Division was made up of National Guard units not already assigned to other divisions, and included representation from 26 states and the District of Columbia.

National Guard participants in World War I included: future President Harry S. Truman, who commanded Battery D, 129th Field Artillery, a unit of the 35th Infantry Division; and William J. Donovan, who received the Medal of Honor as commander of the 42nd Division's 1st Battalion, 165th Infantry Regiment (the federalized designation of New York's 69th Infantry Regiment).

African American National Guardsmen participated in World War I as they had in America's other conflicts. Three of the four regiments which made up the 93rd Division were National Guardsmen, including New York's 15th Infantry, which was federalized as the 369th Infantry Regiment. The 369th fought as part of the French 16th Division, and the entire regiment received the Croix de Guerre, with 171 members receiving the Legion of Honor. In one of the most well known acts of heroism in the war, 369th soldiers Henry Johnson and Needham Roberts fought off a German patrol of at least 24 soldiers, for which Johnson received the Medal of Honor in 2015.

== National Defense Act of 1920 ==
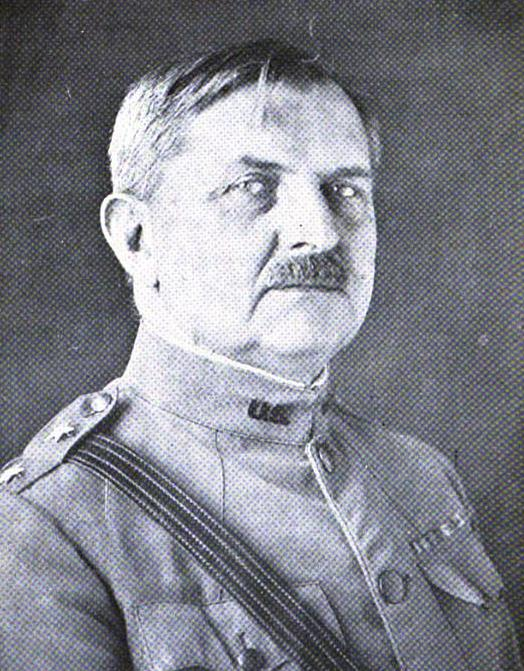
George Rickards, first National Guard officer to be Militia Bureau Chief.

Advocated by National Guard proponents, including John McAuley Palmer, the National Defense Act of 1920 mandated that the Chief of the National Guard Bureau would be a National Guard officer, and the first Guard officer to serve as Chief was George C. Rickards. It also enabled National Guard officers to serve on the Army's general staff in positions other than at the Militia Bureau, reorganized the National Guard's divisions and subordinate commands, and provided federal funding for National Guard unit operating expenses.

== National Defense Act of 1933 ==
The National Defense Act of 1933 provided that the National Guard is considered a component of the Army at all times. Beginning with this law, each National Guard member has two military statuses—a member of the National Guard of his or her state, or a member of the National Guard of the United States when ordered into active duty. This enhanced the 1916 Act's mobilization provisions, making it possible to deploy National Guard units and individual members directly for overseas service in the event of a war, without having to discharge and draft them first.

The 1933 law also changed the name of the Militia Bureau to the National Guard Bureau.

== World War II ==
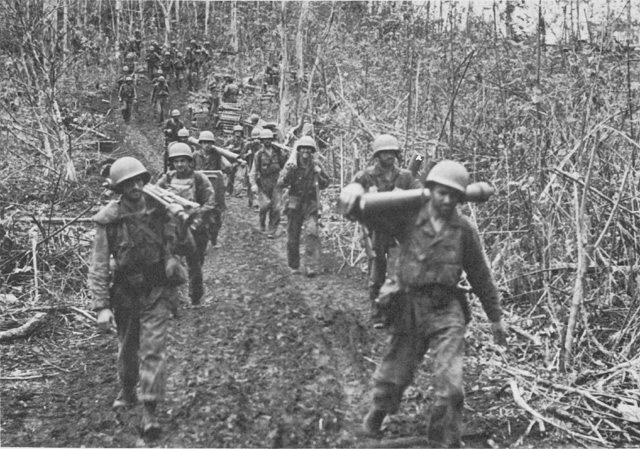
37th Infantry Division troops carry weapons and ammunition forward, 5 August 1943, New Georgia.

In August 1940, the National Guard was ordered to federal service for 12 months in anticipation of American entry into World War II. More than 300,000 National Guardsmen were called up as parts of divisions or in non-divisional units, immediately doubling the size of the active-duty U.S. Army. 18 Army divisions, 80 separate regiments, and 29 Army Air Corps squadrons were mobilized from National Guard organizations beginning in September 1940. After the United States officially entered the war in December 1941, one entirely new division (the Americal) and parts of several other Army divisions were organized with National Guard units.

Because National Guard units had been mobilized for over a year in December 1941, they were among the first to enter combat in the following months. California's 251st Coast Artillery Regiment and Hawaii's 298th Infantry Regiment took part in the defense of Oahu on 7 December 1941, during the Japanese attack on Pearl Harbor. New Mexico's 200th Coast Artillery Regiment and two tank battalions made up of National Guard units from several states were part of the defense of the Philippines, with more than half of these men dying as prisoners of war of the Japanese.

North Dakota's 164th Infantry Regiment, sent to reinforce the U.S. Marines on Guadalcanal in October 1942, was the first U.S. Army regiment to fight on the offensive in World War II. On New Guinea, the 32nd and 41st Infantry Divisions became the first Army divisions to engage and defeat the Japanese in late 1942 and early 1943. In Europe, the 34th Infantry Division was one of the first two US infantry divisions to fight in the European Theater of Operations (ETO) when it landed in Algeria as part of Operation Torch. The 29th Infantry Division of the Virginia, Maryland, Pennsylvania, and District of Columbia National Guards was one of two assault divisions on Omaha Beach in Normandy during the D-Day landings on June 6, 1944.

National Guard units participated in all combat theaters and took part in 34 separate campaigns and seven assault landings, sustaining 175,000 casualties (killed and wounded). 48 Presidential Unit Citations were awarded to National Guard units, and National Guard soldiers received 14 Medals of Honor, 50 Distinguished Service Crosses, 48 Distinguished Flying Crosses, and more than 500 Silver Stars.

Despite the efforts of Regular Army leaders to replace National Guard division commanders with Regular Army officers, National Guard Major Generals Leonard F. Wing and Robert S. Beightler remained in command of their divisions, the 43rd and 37th, and Beightler was the only National Guard general to command his division for the entire duration of the war.

National Guard infantry divisions which participated in the war included the 26th, 27th, 28th, 29th, 30th, 31st, 32nd, 33rd, 34th, 35th, 36th, 37th, 38th, 40th, 41st, 43rd, 44th, and 45th. National Guard regiments were also part of the Americal, 7th, 8th, 24th, and 25th Infantry Divisions.

Division	States Represented	Campaign Participation Credit
26th Infantry Division	Massachusetts	Northern France, Rhineland, Ardennes-Alsace, Central Europe
27th Infantry Division	New York	Elements participated in various campaigns in the Pacific, but not the entire division
28th Infantry Division	Pennsylvania	Normandy, Northern France, Rhineland, Ardennes-Alsace, Central Europe
29th Infantry Division	Maryland, Pennsylvania, Virginia, Washington, D.C.	Normandy, Northern France, Rhineland, Central Europe
30th Infantry Division	Georgia, North Carolina, South Carolina, Tennessee	Normandy, Northern France, Rhineland, Ardennes-Alsace, Central Europe
31st Infantry Division	Alabama, Florida, Louisiana, Mississippi	New Guinea, Southern Philippines
32nd Infantry Division	Michigan, Wisconsin	New Guinea, Southern Philippines, Luzon
33rd Infantry Division	Illinois	New Guinea, Luzon
34th Infantry Division	Iowa, Minnesota, North Dakota, South Dakota	Tunisia, Naples-Foggia, Rome-Arno, North Apennines, Po Valley
35th Infantry Division	Kansas, Missouri, Nebraska	Normandy, Northern France, Rhineland, Ardennes-Alsace, Central Europe
36th Infantry Division	Texas	Naples-Foggia, Rome-Arno, Southern France, Rhineland, Central Europe
37th Infantry Division	Ohio	Northern Solomons, Luzon
38th Infantry Division	Indiana, Kentucky, West Virginia	New Guinea, Southern Philippines, Luzon
40th Infantry Division	California, Nevada, Utah	Bismarck Archipelago, Southern Philippines, Luzon
41st Infantry Division	Idaho, Montana, Oregon, Washington, Wyoming	Papua, New Guinea, Southern Philippines
43rd Infantry Division	Connecticut, Maine, Rhode Island, Vermont	New Guinea, Northern Solomons, Luzon
44th Infantry Division	New Jersey, New York	Northern France, Rhineland, Central Europe
45th Infantry Division	Arizona, Colorado, Oklahoma, New Mexico	Sicily, Naples-Foggia, Anzio, Rome-Arno, Southern France, Rhineland, Ardennes-Alsace, Central Europe

== Post World War II ==
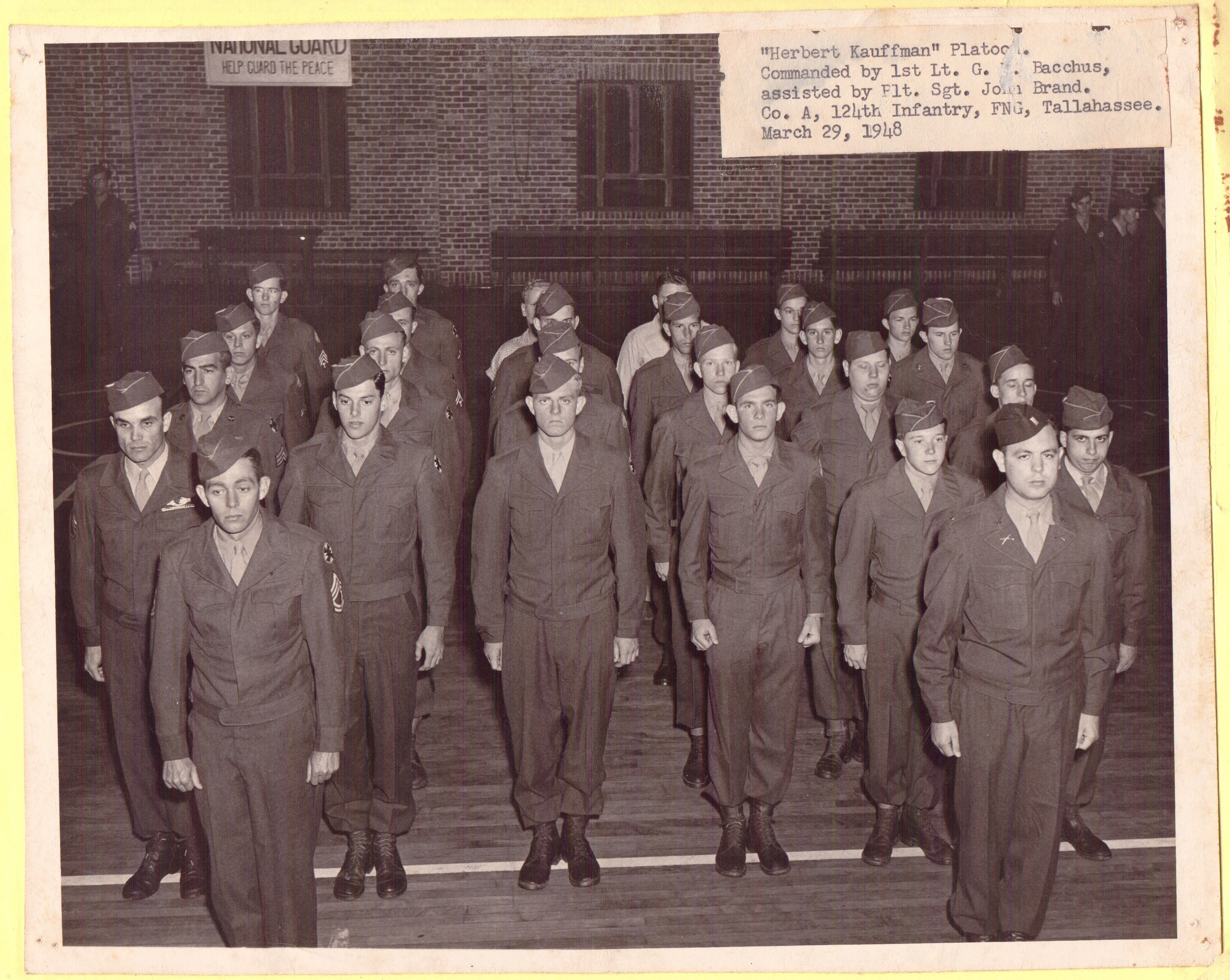
Platoon of Company A, 124th Infantry Regiment, 48th Division (Florida), 1948.

The National Security Act of 1947 created the position of Secretary of Defense and the United States Department of Defense. In addition, it replaced the Secretary of War with the Secretary of the Army. It also removed the Army Secretary and Secretary of the Navy from the cabinet and placed their departments within the Department of Defense.

The 1947 Act also created the United States Air Force as a military service separate from the United States Army, of which it had been part since before World War I.

As a result of the Air Force's creation, the Air National Guard was formed. Under the control of the governors during peacetime, the Air Guard was organized along the same lines as the Army National Guard, as both a militia existing in each of the states, and as a federal reserve component of the US Air Force. The fielding of the Air National Guard also caused the creation of two new positions within the National Guard Bureau, the Director of the Army National Guard and Director of the Air National Guard, who each reported to the Chief of the National Guard Bureau.

The post-World War II reorganization of the National Guard emphasized the creation of numerous Infantry and Armored divisions, which would be needed to provide the large numbers of soldiers and tanks to stop an invasion of Western Europe by the Union of Soviet Socialist Republics. (See Army National Guard#History.)

== Korean War ==
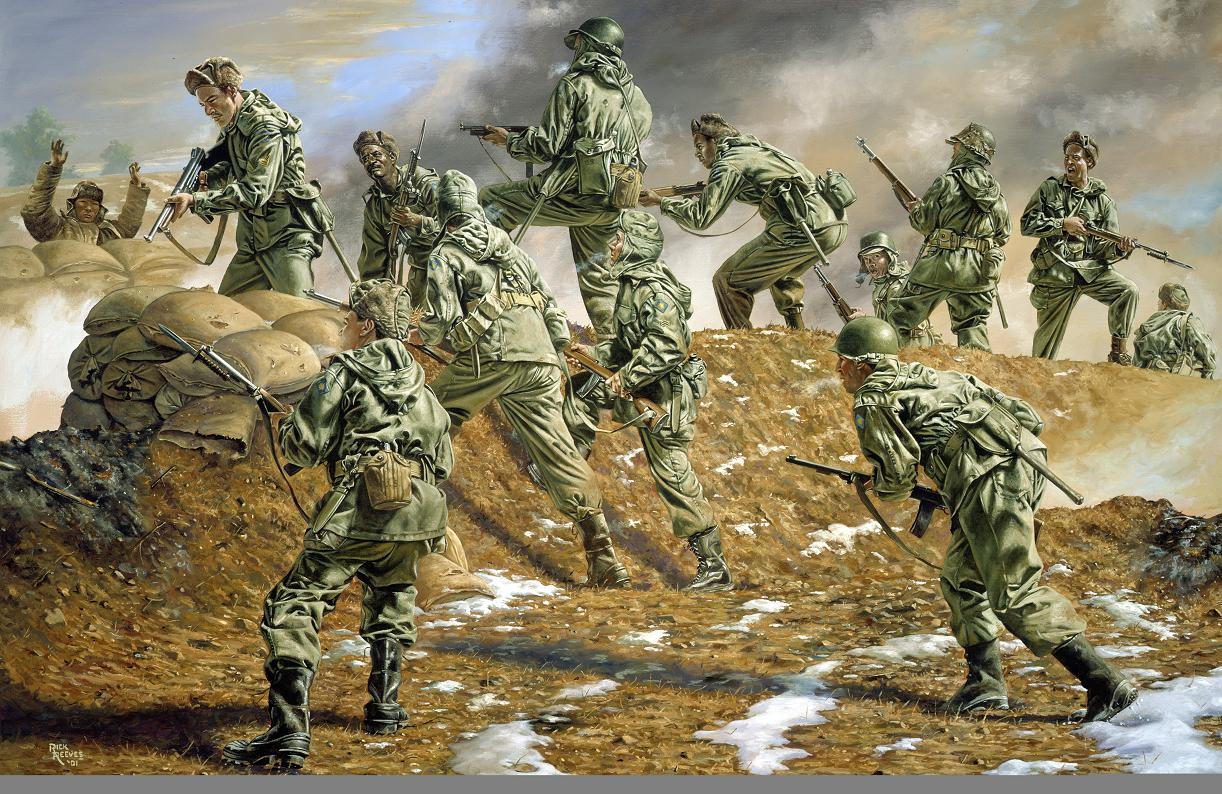
Rick Reeves rendition of 40th Division soldiers in Korea, 1952.

President Harry S. Truman mobilized the National Guard for the Korean War. Four infantry divisions were activated—the 28th; 40th; 43rd; and 45th. The 40th and 45th served in Korea, while the 28th and 43rd deployed to West Germany as part of the Cold War deterrent to an invasion by the Union of Soviet Socialist Republics.

By the end of the war, approximately 700 Army National Guard units had been mobilized, as had thousands of individual volunteers and soldiers involuntarily called to active duty because they had critical skills. Approximately 139,000 Army Guardsmen served during this conflict.

== Post Korean War ==
In 1958 Army and Defense Department leaders decided to realign National Guard and Army Reserve divisions under the Pentomic structure. A controversy arose when the regular Army attempted to reduce the number of planned National Guard divisions to 21, which was resolved when Secretary of Defense Neil H. McElroy decided on 27 for the Army National Guard. By September 1959 the Army National Guard had reorganized into twenty-one infantry and six armored divisions. Non-divisional regimental combat teams were replaced with separate combined arms brigades; Hawaii, Puerto Rico, and Arizona organized the 29th, 92nd and 258th Infantry Brigades.

In the 1962–63 Reorganization Objective Army Division reorganization, the 34th, 35th, 43rd, and 51st Infantry Divisions, multi-state National Guard formations, dropped out of the force. They were replaced in part by the 67th (Nebraska and Iowa), 69th (Kansas and Missouri), 86th (Vermont and Connecticut), and 53rd (Florida and South Carolina) Infantry Brigades. Each brigade fielded five maneuver battalions or squadrons. The following year, to increase flexibility, the 53rd and 86th Infantry Brigades were converted to armor (53rd and 86th Armored Brigades), and the 67th Infantry Brigade was reorganized as mechanized infantry. The 53rd and 67th retained their five maneuver battalions, but the 86th lost one.

== Vietnam War ==
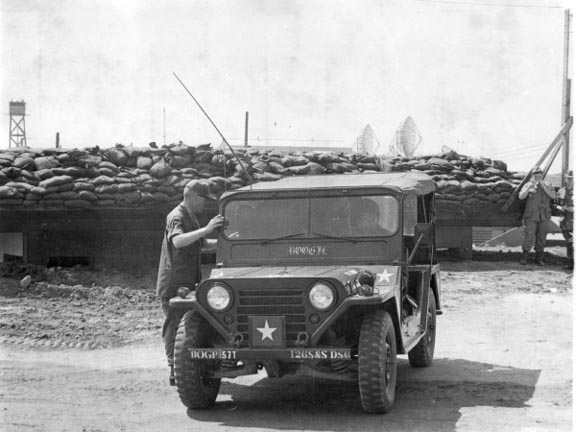
126th Supply & Service Company (Illinois), Vietnam.

During the Vietnam War the Administration of President Lyndon B. Johnson decided upon a draft to enhance active duty troop strength rather than calling on large numbers of the National Guard and Reserves. As a result, membership in a reserve component, including the Army National Guard, became a way to avoid combat service in an unpopular war. Amid accusations of favoritism in enlistment and "easy" service when compared to duty in Vietnam, the reputation of the Army National Guard declined even as enlistments increased.

Despite the decision not to call up the National Guard in full force, some units were activated, and individual National Guard members volunteered to be mobilized. Among the Army National Guard units mobilized during the Vietnam War were Artillery battalions from Kentucky and New Hampshire, and an Engineer company from Vermont. Company D (Long Range Patrol) 151st Infantry Regiment, Indiana Army National Guard, was the only National Guard Infantry unit to serve in Vietnam. During the Vietnam War, 76 Army National Guard units were called up to active duty, it is estimated that 13,000 Army National Guard members were mobilized during this time.

Several Army National Guard units were deployed to Southeast Asia and served in Vietnam, including:

- Alabama's 650th Medical Detachment Team KJ (Dental Services)
- California's 1st Squadron, 18th Armored Cavalry Regiment
- Hawaii's 29th Infantry Brigade
- Idaho's 116th Engineer Battalion (Combat)
- Illinois' 126th Supply and Service Company
- Iowa's 2nd Battalion, 133rd Infantry Regiment
- Indiana's Company D (Ranger), 151st Infantry Regiment
- Kansas' 69th Infantry Brigade
- Kentucky's 2nd Battalion, 138th Field Artillery Regiment
- New Hampshire's 3rd Battalion, 197th Field Artillery Regiment
- Rhode Island's 107th Signal Company (Separate), 1st Signal Brigade
- Numerous Engineer, Postal, Medical and Support units

The National Guard was also activated to quell numerous civil disturbances, including anti-Vietnam War protests and urban riots. The most notable of these was the May, 1970 event at Kent State University, at which four students were killed and nine wounded by members of the Ohio Army National Guard.

During the Vietnam War era the National Guard maintained its role as an organization available to governors for disaster relief.

During the war, the Department of Defense continued to scrutinize the reserve forces. It questioned the number of divisions and brigades, as well as the redundancy of maintaining two reserve components, the National Guard and the Army Reserve. In 1967, Secretary of Defense Robert McNamara decided that 15 combat divisions was too many; he cut the number to eight (one mechanized infantry, two armored, and five infantry), but increased the number of brigades from seven to 18 (one airborne, one armored, two mechanized infantry, and 14 infantry). The loss of the divisions did not set well with the states; their objections included an inadequate mix of maneuver units for the divisions that remained, and an end to the practice of rotating divisional commands among the states that supported them. Under McNamara's proposal, the remaining division commanders were to be members of the National Guard of the state which was home to the division headquarters. The McNamara plan also included no reduction in total Army National Guard end strength, which convinced the states to accept it. To comply with the McNamara plan, the states reorganized their forces between 1 December 1967, and 1 May 1968.

== Post Vietnam War ==
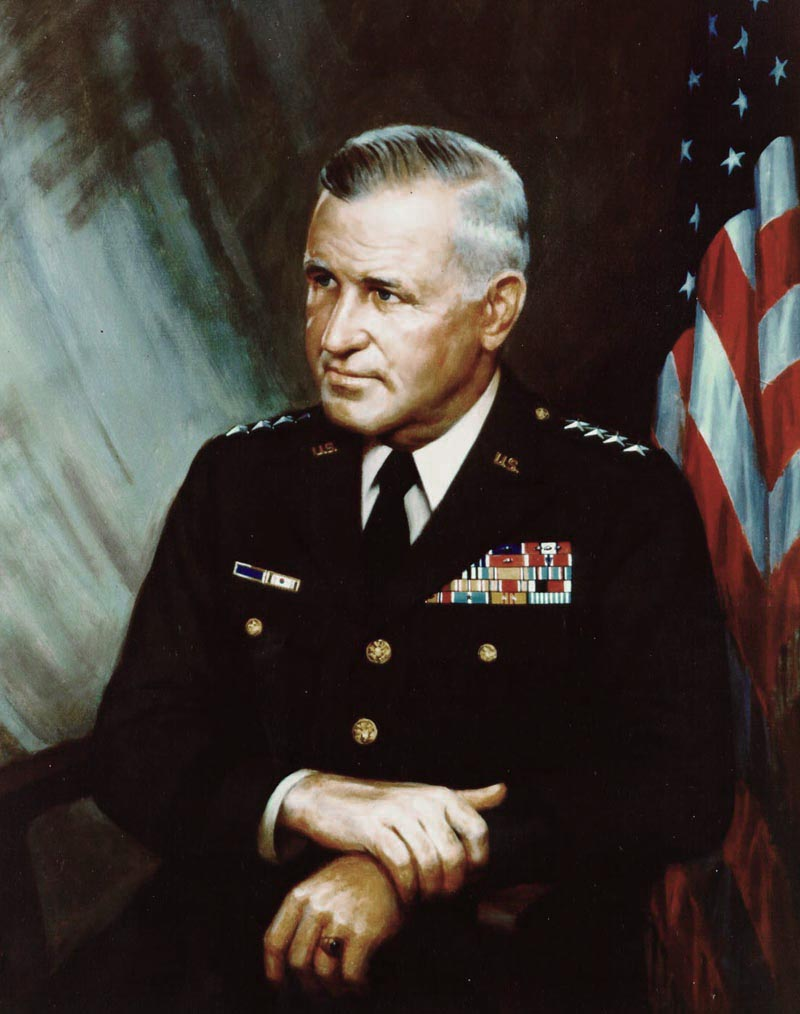
Creighton Abrams proposed the "Abrams Doctrine".

The Army's experience with not having fully used the National Guard during the Vietnam War led to the creation of the 1973 Total Force Policy. With the Vietnam War draft having been ended in favor of an all volunteer military, the Total Force Policy required all active and reserve military organizations to be treated as a single integrated force. Following the experience of fighting in Vietnam without widespread popular support, the TFP was designed to involve the American public in military actions by mobilizing the National Guard from its thousands of locations throughout the United States.

In 1974 the "Abrams Doctrine" further expanded the TFP. Creighton Abrams, who had become commander of Military Assistance Command, Vietnam in 1968, became Chief of Staff of the United States Army in 1972. Having seen the effects of President Johnson's decision to use the draft rather than calling on the National Guard and Reserve in large numbers, Abrams stated that the U.S. should never again go to war without calling up the Guard and Reserve.

== Late 20th century ==
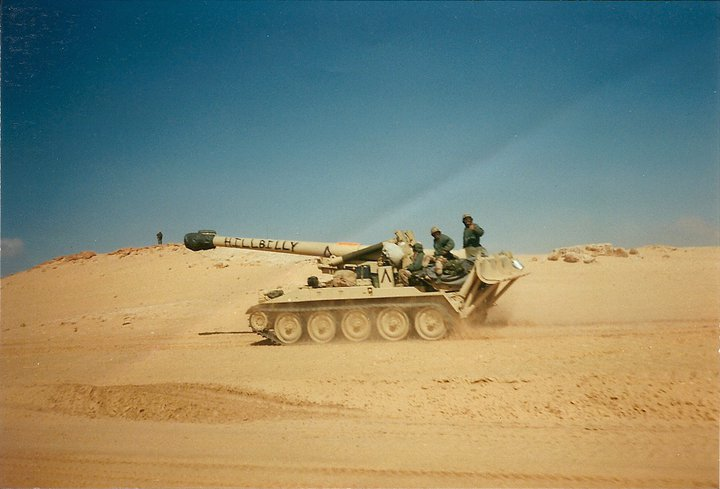
Howitzer Section Number 1, Battery A, 2nd Battalion, 142nd Field Artillery, Arkansas Army National Guard, Operation Desert Storm, January 1991.

For much of the final decades of the twentieth century, National Guard personnel typically served "one weekend a month, two weeks a year", with a portion working for the Guard in a full-time capacity as members of the Active Guard Reserve (AGR) or as dual status federal technicians. (Dual status technicians are traditional National Guard members who are federal civilian employees during the regular work week, and work in uniform.)

As part of the Reagan Era defense build up, the National Guard began to transform from a strategic reserve to an operational one. This included modernization of equipment and weapons, more intensive training during drill and annual training periods, and increased overseas training opportunities.

In the late 1980s several state governors unsuccessfully challenged the authority of the president to federalize the National Guard in their states without their consent. Governor Rudy Perpich and others objected to the National Guard being deployed to Central America during the political debate over whether the United States should be involved in the attempted overthrow of the Sandinista government of Nicaragua.

In the first major test of the Total Force Policy, several Army National Guard units were activated for the 1991 Gulf War, mostly combat support and combat service support organizations. Though there was controversy over the Army's decision not to deploy the "roundout brigades" of three divisions (the 48th Infantry Brigade, 155th Armored Brigade, and 256th Infantry Brigade) once they completed their mobilization training, other Army National Guard units were activated, served in Southwest Asia, and performed well. Approximately 60,000 Army Guard soldiers were activated for the Gulf War, including the 142nd Field Artillery Brigade and 196th Field Artillery Brigade.

The National Guard also continued to carry out its role to aid in civil disturbance control, including responding to the 1992 Los Angeles riots. In addition, it took on an increased role in U.S. illegal drug interdiction efforts. In 1993, the National Guard established the Multijurisdictional Counterdrug Task Force Training program to help train federal, state, and local law enforcement officials in counterdrug efforts. Since its creation, the MCTFT has trainined more than one million registered students through live and distance learning courses.

The National Guard also maintained its role as a state force available to respond to natural disasters, as with 1992's Hurricane Andrew.

In the late 1990s, the Army National Guard was increasingly relied upon for overseas missions, including deployments in Bosnia and Herzegovina, Macedonia and Kosovo for stabilization and peacekeeping missions following the Bosnian War and Kosovo War.

== 21st century ==
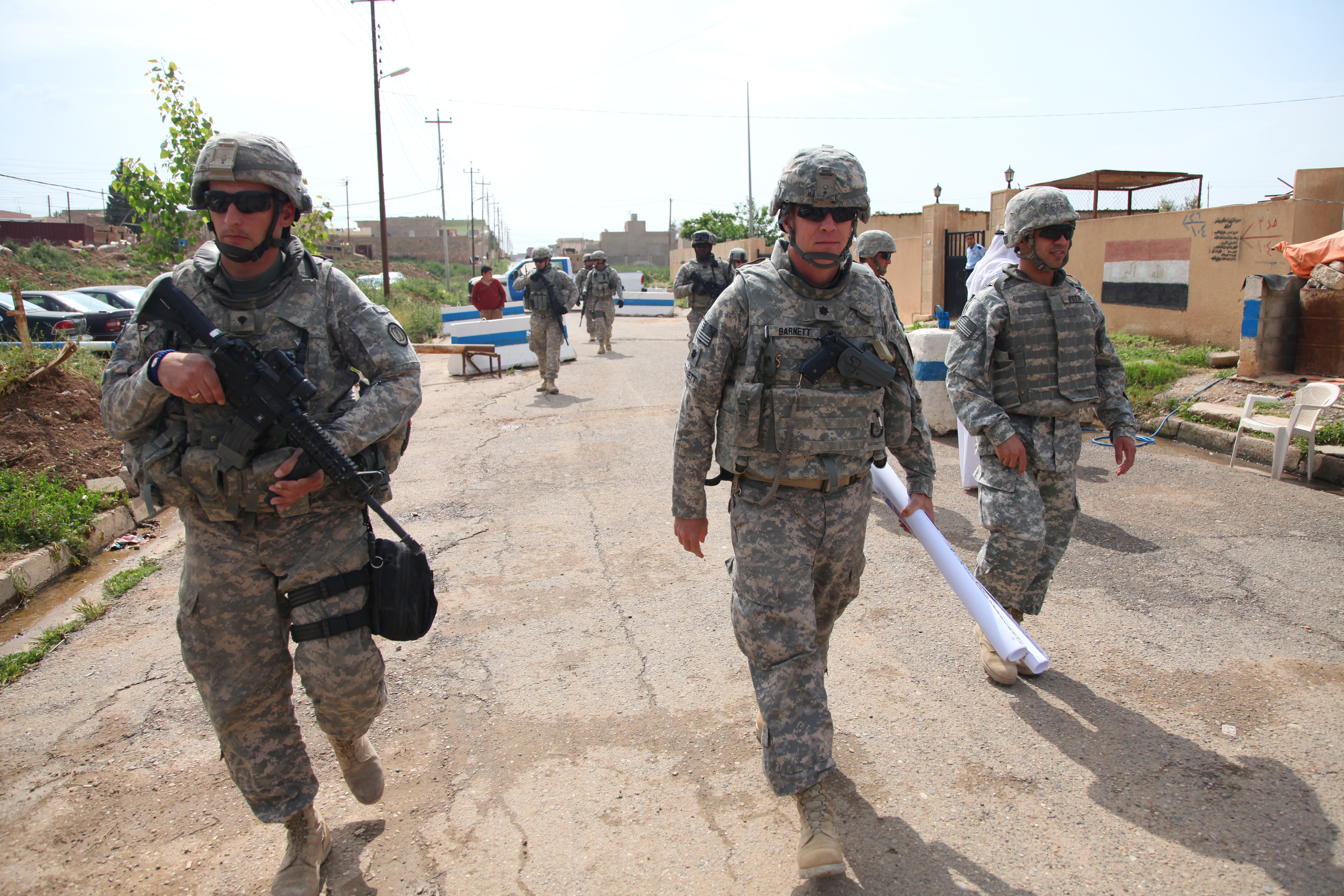
Soldiers from 214th Military Police (MP) Company, Alabama Army National Guard, march towards Tal Kayf Police Station in Tal Kayf district of Mosul, Iraq, May 3, 2011.

The role of the National Guard expanded following the terrorist attacks of September 11, 2001. As part of the global war on terrorism, National Guard units and individual National Guard members performed sustained active duty during Operations Noble Eagle, Enduring Freedom and Iraqi Freedom, both as part of scheduled mobilizations and as individual volunteers. As of 2013, the Army National Guard represents 40% of the US Army's total combat capability.

In addition to deployments for the Global War on Terrorism, National Guard members continued in their roles of disaster relief and providing support to law enforcement when required. These responses included Hurricane Katrina in 2005 and with additional troops sent in 2006, Hurricane Irene in 2011, and Hurricane Sandy and Hurricane Isaac in 2012.

In January, 2013 President Barack Obama signed into law House Bill 1339, which designated Salem, Massachusetts as the official birthplace of the National Guard. The Army National Guard continued to carry out a variety of missions in 2014, both in the United States and overseas, including activities to combat an Ebola epidemic in Africa in late 2014. In 2015 the Army National Guard conducted a variety of activities, including the deployment of soldiers to the Guantanamo Bay detention camp for security operations, and soldiers serving in Afghanistan as part of Operation Resolute Support.

In April and May 2015 members of the Army National Guard were called to respond to demonstrations in Baltimore, Maryland which took place to protest the Death of Freddie Gray.

Members of the Army National Guard in Texas, Louisiana, and Oklahoma responded in late May and early June to spring floods caused by higher than normal rainfall. Also in 2015, Army National Guard members responded to wildfires in several states, including North Dakota, Minnesota, and Alaska,
