= General Weaver =

General Weaver may refer to:

- Erasmus M. Weaver Jr. (1854–1920), U.S. Army major general
- James B. Weaver (1833–1912), Union Army brevet brigadier general
- James D. Weaver (1920–2003), U.S. Air Force brigadier general (posthumously promoted)
- James R.N. Weaver (1888–1967), U.S. Army brigadier general
- Paul A. Weaver (fl. 1960s–2020s), U.S. Air Force major general
- Walter Reed Weaver (1885–1944), U.S. Army major general
