= Emmett H. Walker Jr. =

United States Army general

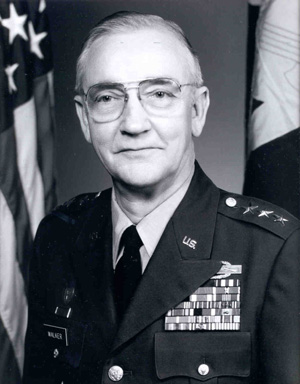
- Walker as lieutenant general and chief, National Guard Bureau
- Born: March 16, 1924; Abbott, Mississippi, U.S.
- Died: December 12, 2007 (aged 83); Jackson, Mississippi, U.S.
- Burial place: Parkway Memorial Cemetery, Ridgeland, Mississippi
- Military career
- Allegiance: United States of America
- Branch: United States Army
- Service years: 1942-1986
- Rank: Lieutenant General (Army); General (Mississippi retired list)
- Nickname: Mickey
- Commands: 4th Battalion, 114th Field Artillery Regiment; 631st Artillery Group; Director of the Army National Guard; Chief of the National Guard Bureau
- Conflicts: World War II; *Battle of Metz; *Battle of the Bulge; *Rhineland Campaign; Korean War
- Awards: Defense Distinguished Service Medal; Army Distinguished Service Medal; Air Force Distinguished Service Medal; Silver Star; Legion of Merit; Bronze Star; Meritorious Service Medal; Army Commendation Medal; Combat Infantryman Badge

Emmett H. "Mickey" Walker (March 16, 1924 – December 11, 2007) was a U.S. Army lieutenant general who served as the Chief of the National Guard Bureau from 1982 to 1986.

== Early life ==
Emmett Hudson Walker Jr. was born in Abbott, Mississippi, on March 16, 1924. He graduated from Starkville High School in 1942 and began studies at Mississippi State University, but left college in order to enlist in the military for World War II.

== World War II ==
Walker enlisted in December 1942, completed Officer Candidate School and received his commission as a second lieutenant of Infantry. Initially assigned to the 42nd Infantry Division during its pre-combat training at Camp Gruber, Oklahoma, he subsequently transferred to the 95th Infantry Division. Walker was a platoon leader in Cannon Company, 378th Infantry Regiment and took part in combat in France, including the Battle of Metz, the Battle of the Bulge and the Rhineland campaign. In addition to the Combat Infantryman Badge, Walker earned the Silver Star and the Bronze Star Medal with "V" for valor.

== Post-World War II ==
Walker resumed his college studies after the war, graduating from Mississippi State in 1947 with a Bachelor of Science degree in agricultural economics.

In 1949 he joined the Mississippi Army National Guard as a first lieutenant in Battery C, 932nd Field Artillery Battalion.

== Korean War ==
Walker was activated for the Korean War, joining the 31st Infantry Division as a captain and serving as a liaison officer at the Far East Command.

== Post-Korean War ==
After returning to the United States, Walker continued his National Guard service, carrying out command and staff assignments in the 31st Division. In 1961, he became commander of 4th Battalion, 114th Field Artillery Regiment as a lieutenant colonel.

From 1968 to 1972, he was a colonel and commander of the 631st Artillery Group.

In 1965, Walker graduated from the United States Army Command and General Staff College. He graduated from the United States Army War College in 1973.

Walker served as Mississippi's assistant adjutant general from 1972 to 1976, earning promotion to brigadier general.

== National Guard Bureau ==
In 1976 Walker was appointed deputy director of the Army National Guard, succeeding Joseph R. Jelinek. He held this position until 1978, when he was promoted to major general and succeeded Charles A. Ott Jr. as director of the Army National Guard.

Walker was appointed chief of the National Guard Bureau in 1982 and promoted to lieutenant general. He served in this position until his 1986 retirement.

A longtime friend of Congressman Sonny Montgomery, Walker worked with him on the creation of the Montgomery G.I. Bill of 1984, which expanded educational benefits and helped improve recruiting of new service members and retention of existing ones.

== Retirement and death ==
In retirement Walker was one of the organizers of the Mississippi Armed Forces Museum at Camp Shelby. He also served as Treasurer of the National Guard Association of the United States.

Walker died at Baptist Medical Center in Jackson, Mississippi on December 12, 2007. He is buried at Parkway Memorial Cemetery in Ridgeland, Mississippi.

== Awards and decorations ==
In addition to his valor awards for World War II, Walker was also a recipient of the Defense Distinguished Service Medal, Army Distinguished Service Medal, Air Force Distinguished Service Medal, Legion of Merit, Meritorious Service Medal and Army Commendation Medal.

At his retirement, Walker received from Governor Bill Allain a state promotion to full general (four stars) as recognition of the sustained superior performance he rendered throughout his career.

During World War II, Walker's entire Reserve Officers' Training Corps class at Mississippi State University left school to enlist. Recalling his leadership and military abilities, during a reunion in 1993 Walker was belatedly named the class Honor Graduate.

== Legacy ==
The Mississippi Armed Forces Museum at Camp Shelby is named for him, as is the Mississippi National Guard's complex in Jackson. In addition, the Jackson chapter of the Military Order of World Wars is also named for him.

== See also ==
Military offices
Preceded by LTG La Vern E. Weber	Chief of the National Guard Bureau; 1982 - 1986	Succeeded by LTG Herbert R. Temple Jr.
