= Joseph R. Jelinek =

United States Army general

- Born: May 26, 1919; Omaha, Nebraska, U.S.
- Died: May 13, 1978 (aged 58); Fairfax, Virginia, U.S.
- Burial place: Arlington National Cemetery
- Military career
- Allegiance: United States
- Branch: United States Army
- Service years: 1939–1976
- Rank: Brigadier General
- Units: Nebraska Army National Guard; Army National Guard
- Conflicts: World War II
- Awards: Legion of Merit; Purple Heart; Bronze Star Medal

Joseph R. Jelinek (May 26, 1919 – May 13, 1978) was a United States Army Brigadier General who served as deputy director of the Army National Guard.

== Early life ==
Joseph Richard Jelinek was born in Omaha, Nebraska on May 26, 1919. He attended Creighton University and in 1939 joined Company L, 134th Infantry Regiment, a unit of the Nebraska Army National Guard.

== World War II ==
Jelinek was a Corporal when his unit was activated for training in anticipation of United States entry into World War II. He graduated from Officer Candidate School in 1943 and received his commission as a Second Lieutenant of Infantry.

He served in the Pacific Theater with the 32nd Infantry Division, and received the Bronze Star Medal, Purple Heart and Combat Infantryman Badge.

== Post World War II ==
Jelinek remained in the National Guard, primarily in command and staff positions with the 34th Infantry Division and the Nebraska Army National Guard.

He served as Chief of the National Guard Bureau's Office of Plans, Policy and Programs from 1967 to 1969, and as the Executive Officer to the Chief of the National Guard Bureau from 1969 to 1971. From 1971 to 1973 he served on the staff in the Office of the Secretary of Defense.

He was appointed deputy director of the Army National Guard in 1973 and promoted to Brigadier General. Jelinek served in this position until 1976.

== Awards and decorations ==
In addition to his World War II awards, Jelinek was a recipient of the Legion of Merit and the Meritorious Service Medal.

=== Additional awards ===
In 1991 Jelinek was named to the Nebraska Army National Guard Regional Training Institute's Hall of Fame.

== Death and burial ==
Jelinek died in Fairfax, Virginia on May 13, 1978, following an extended illness. He was buried at Arlington National Cemetery, Section 11, Grave 681–1.

== Family ==
In 1941 Jelinek married Eleanor Dreier (1921–1984). They were the parents of one daughter and four sons: Cindy; Donald Paul; Joseph Michael; Steven Richard; and David Alan.
