= Robert K. Evans =

United States Army general

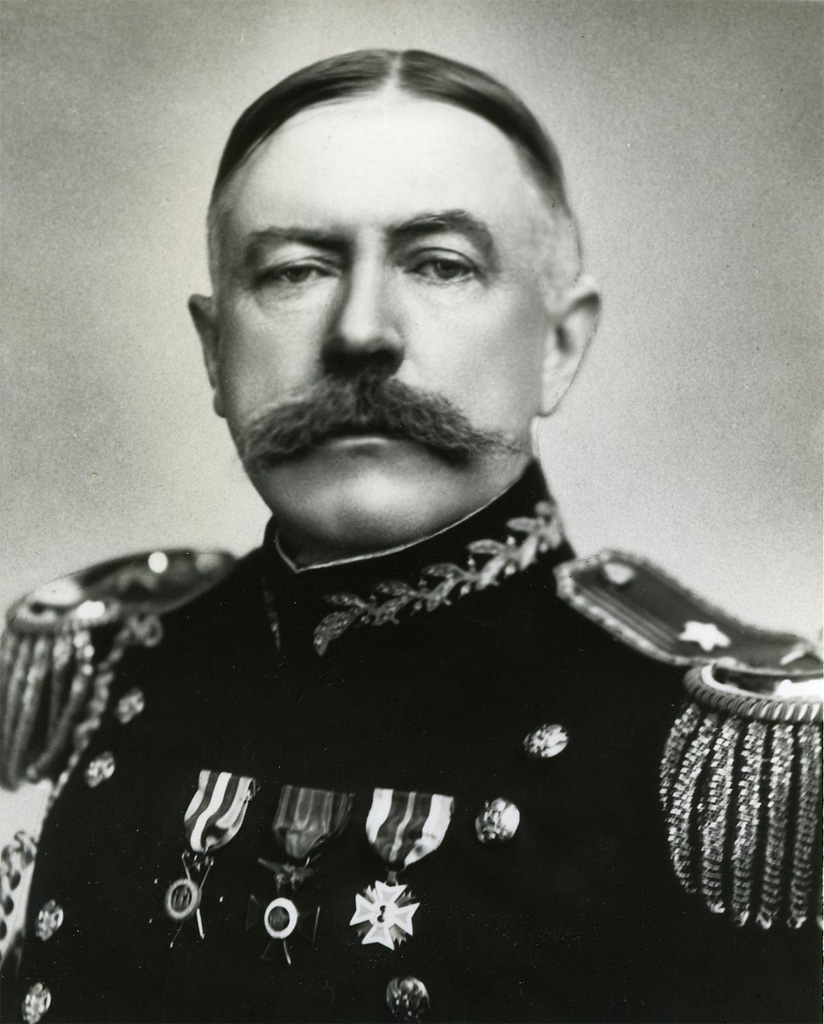
- Brigadier General Robert Kennon Evans
- Born: November 19, 1852; Jackson, Mississippi, U.S.
- Died: July 31, 1926 (aged 73); Camaldoli, Italy
- Burial place: Campo Cestio, Rome, Italy
- Military career
- Branch: United States Army
- Service years: 1875–1918
- Rank: Brigadier General
- Commands: Chief of the Militia Bureau (1911 to 1912); Department of the Gulf (1912 to 1914); Department of the East (1914); Hawaiian Department (1916); Philippine Department (1917 to 1918)
- Conflicts: Indian Wars; Spanish–American War; World War I
- Awards: Distinguished Service Medal; Silver Star (2)

Brigadier General Robert Kennon Evans (November 19, 1852 – July 31, 1926) was a United States Army officer who served in several high-profile assignments, including Chief of the National Guard Bureau and commander of the Hawaiian Department.

== Early life ==
Robert Kennon Evans was born in Jackson, Mississippi on November 19, 1852. He attended the University of Mississippi, graduated from the United States Military Academy in 1875, and received his commission as a second lieutenant of Infantry.

== Start of career ==
Initially assigned to the 12th Infantry, Evans served with the regiment until 1898, receiving promotion to first lieutenant in 1882 and captain in 1893. From 1887 to 1898 Evans was the regimental adjutant. During his service with the 12th Infantry Evans was assigned to a variety of posts, including California, Kansas, North Dakota, and numerous sites in Arizona, and New York. He was a veteran of the Nez Perce War and the Bannock War. During the Spanish–American War he served in Cuba and took part in the Battles of El Caney and San Juan Hill.

During his service with the 12th Infantry Evans also performed detached duty, including military attache at the U.S. Embassy in Berlin, Germany.

== Later career ==
In 1901 Evans was promoted to major in the 30th Infantry, and was soon reassigned to the 12th Infantry, while performing duty with the Army's Adjutant General department. In 1905 he was promoted to lieutenant colonel in the 5th Regiment, and performed duty with the 28th Infantry and Army General Staff.

In 1908 and 1909 Evans was director of the Army War College and served as acting president.

Evans was promoted to colonel in 1909 and assigned to the 30th Infantry, where he served until 1911. In 1911 Evans was promoted to brigadier general and selected to serve as Chief of the Militia Bureau, the forerunner of the National Guard Bureau.

== Career as a general officer ==
After leaving the Militia Bureau in 1912 Evans continued to serve in command assignments, including the Department of the Gulf (1912–1914), the Department of the East (1914), the 2nd Infantry Brigade in Laredo, Texas (1914 to 1916), and the Hawaiian Department in 1916.

Evans took temporary command of the Department of the East in March, 1914, succeeding Major General Thomas Barry. In late June 1914, during a speech he gave in New York City, he made comments critical of President Woodrow Wilson's foreign policy. Evans was reprimanded for his comments, promptly replaced by Major General Leonard Wood, and given orders to command the 2nd Infantry Brigade in Texas, a lower profile assignment than the Department of the East.

Evans retired in 1916. In 1917 he volunteered for World War I, was recalled to active duty and assigned as commander of the Philippine Department, where he served until 1918. He retired again in 1918.

== Awards and decorations ==
Evans was awarded the Silver Star twice, once for heroism at El Caney and once for heroism while fighting insurgents in Luzon. He received the Distinguished Service Medal at his retirement.

== Published works ==
A noted author of articles on military subjects, Evans's published works included "The Indian Question in Arizona" (Atlantic Monthly, August, 1886); and The Infantry of Our Regular Army, Its History, Possibilities and Necessities (Monographs of the U.S. Infantry Society, 1898).

== Retirement and death ==
In retirement Evans lived in Washington, D.C., and later relocated to Camaldoli, Italy, where he died on July 31, 1926. He was buried in Rome, Italy's Campo Cestio.

== Family ==
In 1880, Evans married Jane Findlay Shunk (1859–1938), a daughter of Rebekah Black and James F. Shunk, and a granddaughter of Jeremiah S. Black. They were the parents of a son, Hornsby Evans (1883–1932).

Military offices
Preceded by Erasmus M. Weaver Jr.	Chief of the National Guard Bureau; 1911–1912	Succeeded by Albert Leopold Mills
