= La Vern E. Weber =

United States Army general

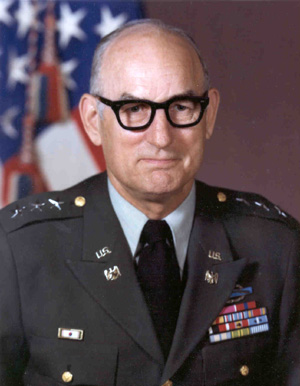
- Lieutenant General La Vern E. Weber as National Guard Bureau Chief
- Born: September 23, 1923; Lone Wolf, Oklahoma, U.S.
- Died: December 30, 1999 (aged 76); Perry, Oklahoma, U.S.
- Military career
- Allegiance: United States of America
- Branch: United States Army
- Service years: 1942–1984
- Rank: Lieutenant general
- Units: Oklahoma National Guard; National Guard Bureau
- Commands: Oklahoma National Guard; Army National Guard; National Guard Bureau
- Conflicts: World War II; Korean War
- Awards: Distinguished Service Medal (U.S. Army); Air Force Distinguished Service Medal; Legion of Merit
- Other work: Executive Director, National Guard Association of the United States, 1984–1993

La Vern E. Weber (September 3, 1923 – December 30, 1999) was a United States Army officer who served as 10th Adjutant General of Oklahoma, Director of the Army National Guard and Chief of the National Guard Bureau (NGB). He was the first NGB Chief to hold the rank of lieutenant general.

== Early life ==
La Vern Erick Weber was born in Lone Wolf, Oklahoma, on September 3, 1923. He attended the University of Oklahoma and Louisiana Tech University, where he played football before leaving in 1942 to enlist for World War II.

Originally part of the navy's V-12 program, he received a commission in the Marine Corps upon completing Officer Candidate School in 1945. He served in the Marine Corps Reserve until 1948.

He graduated from Oklahoma's East Central State College (now East Central University) with a Bachelor of Science degree in education in 1948, and then joined the Oklahoma National Guard as a second lieutenant. In addition to maintaining a farm, he worked as a teacher and coach.

== Korean War ==
In 1950, Weber was mobilized with the 45th Infantry Division for the Korean War. He served as operations and training officer (S3) of the 2nd Battalion, 180th Infantry Regiment.

== Post-war ==
Weber returned to Oklahoma in 1952 and was assigned as operations and training officer for the 179th Infantry Regiment. In 1955, he graduated from the United States Army Command and General Staff College and was assigned as intelligence officer (G2) of the 45th Infantry Division.

In 1961 Weber became the 45th Division's personnel staff officer (G1), and in 1964 he was appointed division chief of staff, receiving a promotion to colonel. In 1965 Weber was appointed adjutant general by Governor Henry Bellmon and promoted to brigadier general and then major general.

== National Guard Bureau ==
In 1971, Weber was appointed director of the Army National Guard.

In 1974, he was appointed Chief of the National Guard Bureau, and Charles A. Ott Jr. succeeded Weber as director of the Army National Guard. In 1979, he was promoted to lieutenant general.

== FORSCOM ==
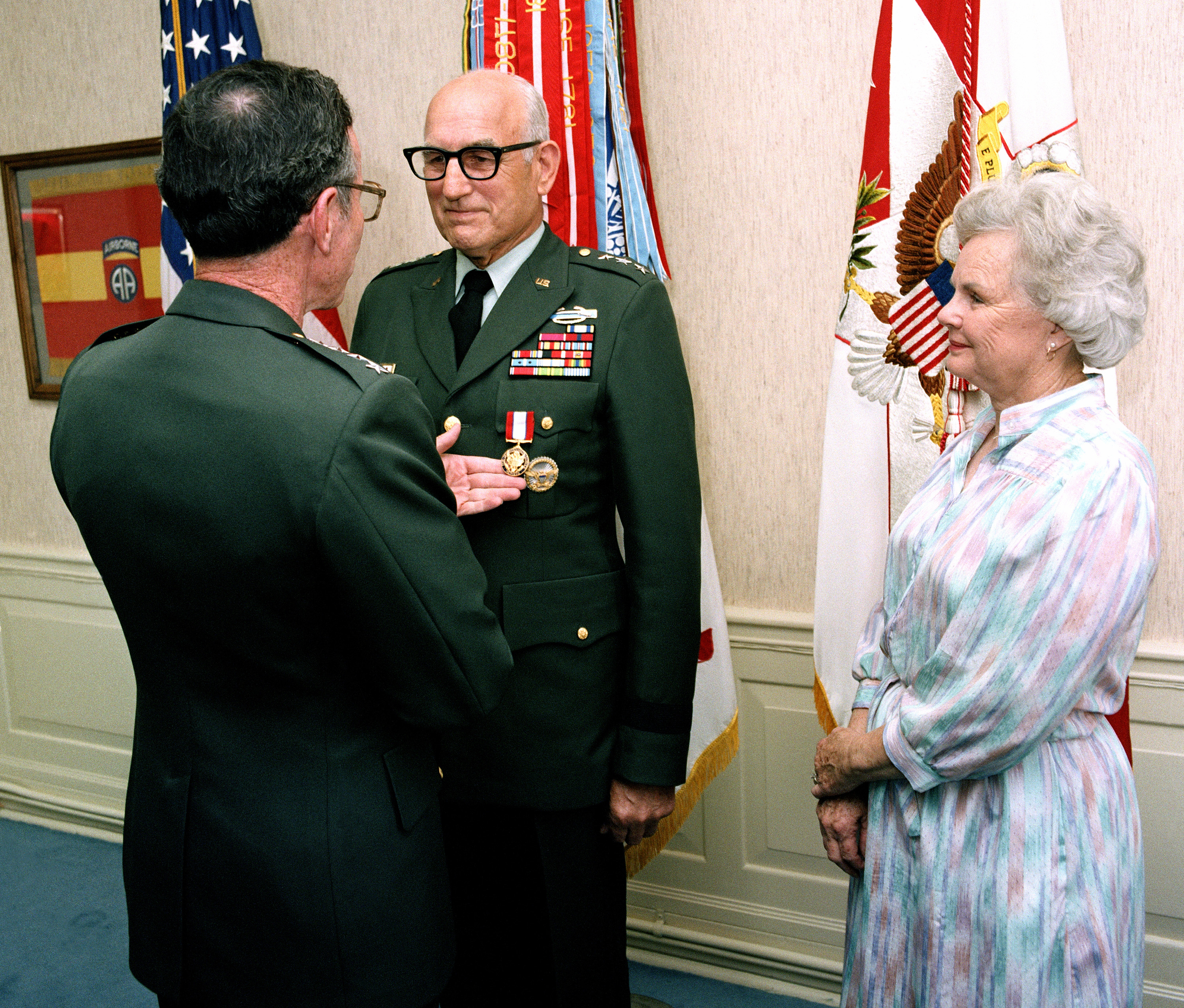
Gen. Maxwell R. Thurman, left, Vice Chief of Staff, U.S. Army, awards the Distinguished Service Medal to Lt. Gen. Weber during Weber's retirement ceremony at the Pentagon. Weber's wife Bette is at right.

Weber served as deputy commander for mobilization and readiness at United States Army Forces Command (FORSCOM) and executive officer of the Reserve Forces Policy Board (RFPB) from 1982 until retiring in 1984.

== Awards and decorations ==
Weber's awards included the:

- Army Distinguished Service Medal
- Legion of Merit
- Marine Corps Good Conduct Medal
- Selected Marine Corps Reserve Medal
- Army of Occupation Medal
- American Campaign Medal
- World War II Victory Medal
- National Defense Service Medal with bronze star
- Armed Forces Reserve Medal with silver hourglass device
- Korean Service Medal
- United Nations Service Medal
- Republic of Korea Presidential Unit Citation

== Post-military career ==
After retiring from the military, Weber was appointed executive director of the National Guard Association of the United States, and he served until 1993.

== Retirement and death ==
In retirement, Weber lived on a farm near Perry, Oklahoma.

He died there on December 30, 1999, as the result of injuries sustained when fence panels he was preparing to install fell on him. Weber was buried in the Oklahoma Veterans Cemetery in Oklahoma City.

== Legacy ==
The National Guard Professional Education Center (NGPEC) at Camp Joseph T. Robinson, Arkansas, is named for him.

Military offices
| Preceded by Francis Greenlief | Chief of the National Guard Bureau; 1974-1982 | Succeeded by Emmett H. Walker, Jr. |
