= Walter Reed Weaver =

United States Army general

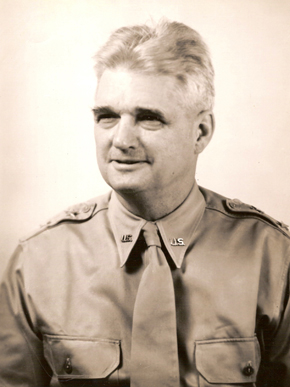
- Weaver as commander of the Southeast Air Corps Training Center at Maxwell Field, 1941.
- Born: February 23, 1885; Charleston, South Carolina, US
- Died: October 27, 1944 (aged 59); Washington, D.C., US
- Burial place: Arlington National Cemetery
- Military career
- Allegiance: United States
- Branch: United States Army
- Service years: 1908–1943
- Rank: Major general
- Service number: 0-2405
- Commands: Aviation Mechanical School; Mitchel Field; Hanscom Field; Middletown Air Depot; Maxwell Field; Langley Field; Air Corps Tactical School; Army Air Corps; Technical Training Command
- Conflicts: World War I World War II
- Awards: Army Distinguished Service Medal

Walter Reed Weaver (February 23, 1885 – October 27, 1944) was a career officer in the United States Army. He attained the rank of major general and was prominent for serving in several United States Army Air Forces command positions during World War II.

== Early life and start of career ==
Walter R. Weaver was born in Charleston, South Carolina on February 23, 1885, while his father, Erasmus M. Weaver Jr., was assigned to The Citadel as a Professor of Military Science.

The younger Weaver attended the Virginia Military Institute in preparation for a military career. He left after his third year in order to accept an appointment to the United States Military Academy. He graduated in 1908, received his commission as a second lieutenant in the Infantry, and was assigned to the 11th Infantry Regiment at Fort D. A. Russell, Wyoming.

Weaver's subsequent assignments included: The 28th Infantry Regiment at Fort Snelling, Minnesota; Aide-de-camp to Brigadier General Eli D. Hoyle in the Philippines; and the 15th Infantry Regiment in Tientsin, China. Upon returning to the United States in 1915, Weaver carried out assignments at Columbus Barracks, Ohio and Fort Thomas, Kentucky.

== World War I ==
At the beginning of World War I Weaver transferred to the Aviation Section of the Signal Corps, and was initially assigned as Commandant of Flying Cadets at Wilbur Wright Field, Ohio, receiving promotion to major.

Weaver was subsequently assigned as the first commander of the Aviation Mechanical School in St. Paul, Minnesota. While en route, he learned that 500 students were already traveling to the site, but that the school was being formed so quickly that there were no plans for housing, feeding or instructional facilities. Within two days, he had secured the use of a Willys-Overland factory building via a verbal agreement with the company president, cleared the site of over 3,000 stored automobiles using volunteer labor, and supervised the installation of bunks, classrooms and mess halls. On the third day after his arrival, the school was operational and the arriving students were able to begin their instruction as scheduled. He continued in command until the end of the war, and supervised the education of thousands of soldiers who served as airplane mechanics in the United States and Europe.

== Post-World War I ==
After the war Weaver was assigned as Chief of the Supply Group in the Office of the Director of the Army Air Service. In 1920 and 1921 he completed flight training at Kelly Field, Texas, and March Field, California, and received his qualification as a pilot.

In 1922 Weaver was assigned to command of Mitchel Field, New York. This site had become rundown as the result of budget cutbacks and force reductions following the war. Weaver supervised an overhaul, and within a year, buildings had been repaired, hangars had floors installed, and aircraft parking ramps and aprons had been paved.

Weaver's assignments following Mitchel Field included command of Hanscom Field, Massachusetts, Middletown Air Depot, Pennsylvania, and Maxwell Field, Alabama. He graduated from the Army Industrial College in 1932, and then served as Chief of the Plans Division and Chief of the Information Division in the Office of the Chief of the Air Corps. In 1934 he was assigned to New York City as the Procurement Planning Representative of the Air Corps.

In 1935 the Air Corps created a separate headquarters at Langley Field, Virginia, and Weaver was assigned as Inspector General. From 1937 to 1939 he was the commander of Langley Field.

Weaver was assigned to command of the Air Corps Tactical School at Maxwell Field in 1939. In this position he was responsible for developing doctrine and tactical training for pilots and air crews in advance of World War II.

== World War II ==
In 1940 the Army Air Forces began to expand in preparation for war and Weaver was assigned to command the Southeast Air Corps Training Center at Maxwell Field, receiving promotion to brigadier general. In this assignment he oversaw the training of thousands of pilots and flight crew members who served in all theaters of the war. In July, 1941 Weaver was promoted to major general.

Weaver was the acting Chief of the Air Corps from December 1941 until March 1942. As acting Chief he supervised completion of a reorganization and expansion plan for the Air Corps, including its re-designation as the Army Air Forces. This reorganization included the creation of the First Technical Training District (later Eastern Technical Training Command) in South Carolina, which Weaver was assigned to command. As part of his effort to create basic training centers and officer candidate schools for new recruits, Weaver arranged for the use of resort hotels in Atlantic City, Miami Beach, St. Petersburg, and Chicago, arguing successfully that these facilities, then being underused because people were unable to take vacations during the war, were the only ones that were vacant and large enough for the needs of the military.

In July 1943 Weaver's health began to fail as the result of overexertion required by his wartime command, and he was retired for physical disability. He then continued to aid the war effort as a consultant with the Aviation Corporation, a manufacturer of airplanes and airplane parts.

== Death and burial ==
Weaver's health continued to fail, and he died at Walter Reed Hospital on October 27, 1944. He was buried at Arlington National Cemetery, Section South, Site 1908.

== Family ==
In 1911 Weaver married Elizabeth K. Johnson (1891-1978), the daughter of a railroad executive. They had no children.

== Awards and decorations ==
Weaver was a recipient of the Army Distinguished Service Medal for his World War II service.

== Legacy ==
The Major General Walter Reed Weaver, an Air Forces Floating Maintenance Unit ship, was named for him. It was deployed to the Pacific Theater during World War II.

== Sources ==
- Walter Reed Weaver at West Point Association of Graduates
- Walter Reed Weaver at Military Times Hall of Valor
- Generals of World War II
