= Chief of the National Guard Bureau =

Highest-ranking officer of the United States National Guard

- Seal of the National Guard Bureau

- Flag of the Chief

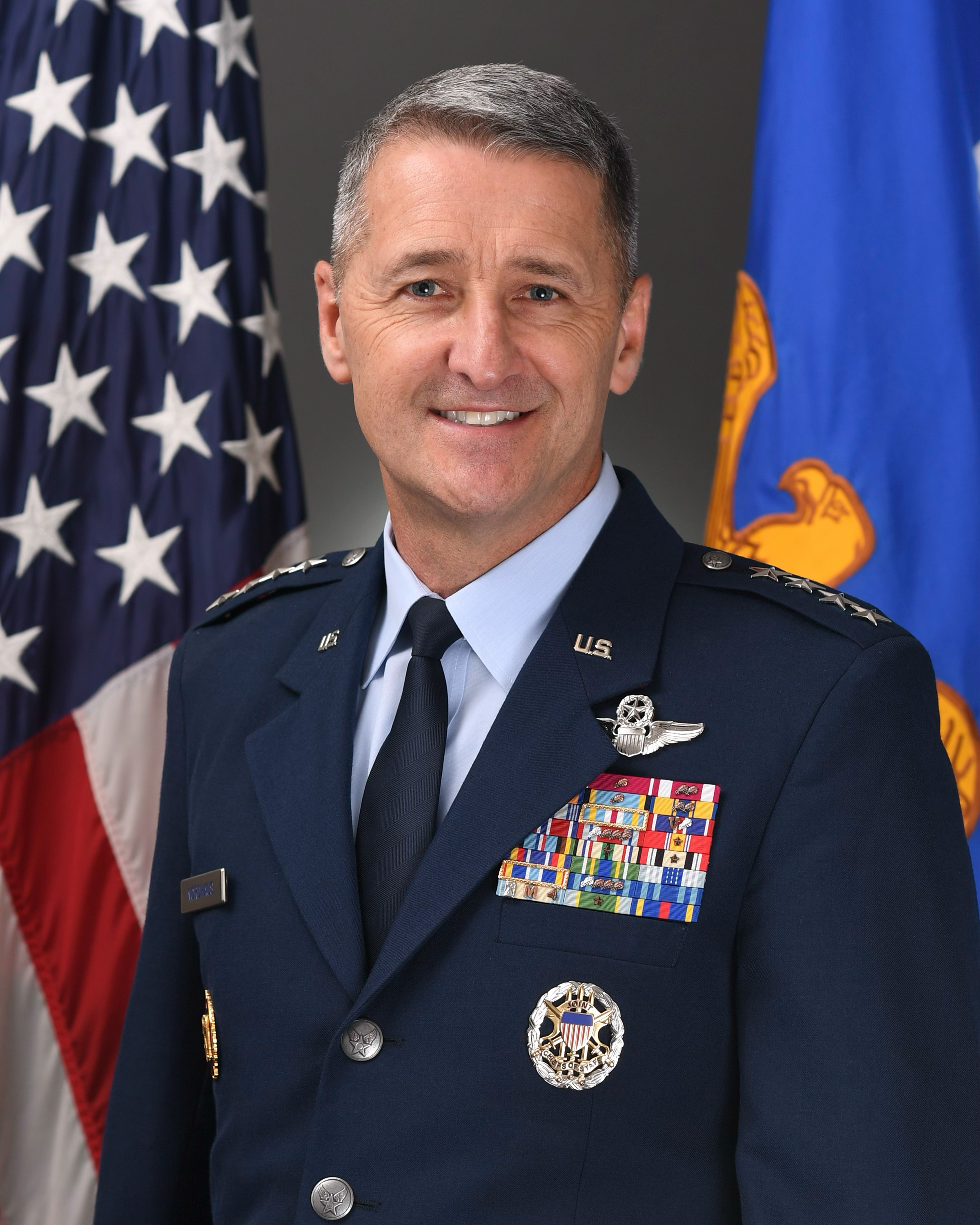
- Incumbent; General Steven S. Nordhaus since 2 October 2024
- National Guard Bureau
- Abbreviation: CNGB
- Member of: Joint Chiefs of Staff
- Reports to: Chairman of the Joint Chiefs of Staff
- Nominator: President
- Appointer: Senate
- Term length: 4 years; Renewable
- Constituting instrument: 10 U.S.C. § 10502
- Formation: 14 February 1908
- First holder: COL Erasmus M. Weaver Jr.
- Deputy: Vice Chief of the National Guard Bureau
- Website: Official Website

The chief of the National Guard Bureau (CNGB) is the highest-ranking officer of the National Guard and the head of the National Guard Bureau. The position is a statutory office (10 U.S.C. § 10502), held by a federally recognized commissioned officer who has served at least 10 years of federally recognized active duty in the National Guard; the Army National Guard or the Air National Guard. In a separate capacity as a member of the Joint Chiefs of Staff (10 U.S.C. § 151), the chief is a military adviser to the National Security Council, the Homeland Security Council, the secretary of defense, and the president on matters pertaining to the National Guard.

The chief is nominated for appointment by the president from any eligible National Guard officers holding the rank of major general or above, who also meets the requirements for the position as determined by defense secretary and the chairman of the Joint Chiefs of Staff, under the advice and/or recommendation from their respective state governors and their service secretary. The chief and vice chief of the National Guard Bureau cannot be from the same service. The nominee must be confirmed via majority vote from the Senate. The chief serves a four-year term of office at the pleasure of the president. By statute, the Chief is appointed as a four-star general in the Army or Air Force, serving as a reserve officer on active duty.

The current chief of the National Guard Bureau is General Steven Nordhaus, who assumed command on 2 October 2024.

== History ==
In 1908, the United States Army created the Militia Bureau to oversee training and readiness for the National Guard as part of implementing the Militia Act of 1903. From 1908 to 1911, Erasmus M. Weaver Jr. served as head of the Army's Militia Bureau, the first person to hold the position. The National Defense Act of 1920 included a provision that the chief of the Militia Bureau must be a National Guard officer. In 1921 Pennsylvania National Guard officer George C. Rickards became the first guardsman to serve as chief, and he held the post until his 1925 retirement.

In September 1947, the Air National Guard was created, and the positions of Chief the Army Division and Chief of the Air Division were established, with the directors subordinate to the NGB Chief. In 1953, Air National Guard director Earl T. Ricks served as acting chief of the National Guard Bureau, making him the first Air Guard officer to hold the chief's position. In the mid-1970s, the chief of the National Guard Bureau position was elevated from major general to lieutenant general, and La Vern E. Weber became the first NGB chief to wear three stars.

The 2008 National Defense Authorization Act elevated the chief of the National Guard Bureau to the four-star rank of general making Craig McKinley the first National Guard officer to achieve four-star rank. In 2012, the position became the seventh member of the U.S. Joint Chiefs of Staff via the 2012 National Defense Authorization Act, which was signed into law by President Obama on 31 December 2011. The sitting Joint Chiefs at the time, had opposed the addition of another member, but the president promised in his 2008 campaign to elevate the office.

== Previous flag ==
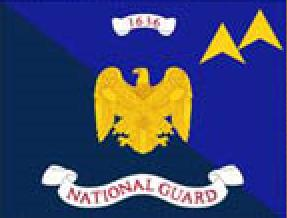

This positional flag for the chief of the National Guard Bureau was used from 1998 to 2008. The dark blue represented the Army National Guard, the light blue represented the Air National Guard. The badge in the center is the branch insignia of the National Guard Bureau. The two triangles in the upper fly are "flight devices" and represent the Air National Guard.

The current version of the flag was adopted in 2008 when the position of Chief of the National Guard Bureau was upgraded to four-star general.

== List of chiefs of the National Guard Bureau ==
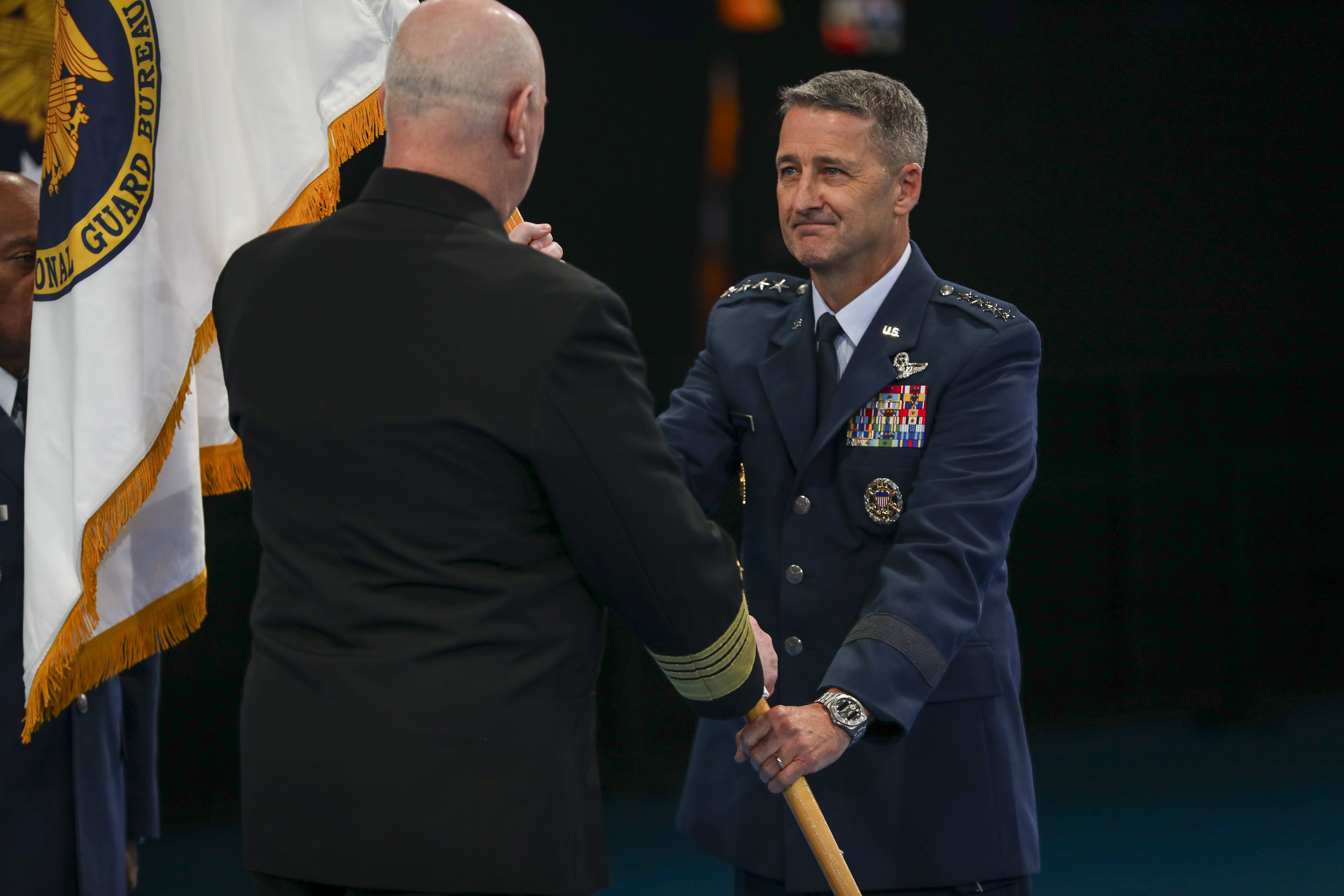
General Steven Nordhaus, incoming chief of the National Guard Bureau, receives the NGB command guidon from Admiral Christopher W. Grady (back facing camera) on 15 October 2024.

No.	Commander		Term			Service branch
No.	Portrait	Name	Took office	Left office	Term length	Service branch
1	Erasmus M. Weaver Jr.	Colonel; Erasmus M. Weaver Jr. (1854–1920)	14 February 1908	14 March 1911	3 years, 28 days	U.S. Army
2	Robert K. Evans	Brigadier General; Robert K. Evans (1852–1926)	15 March 1911	31 August 1912	1 year, 169 days	U.S. Army
3	Albert L. Mills	Major General; Albert L. Mills (1854–1916)	1 September 1912	18 September 1916	4 years, 17 days	U.S. Army
-	George W. McIver	Colonel; George W. McIver (1858–1947); Acting	18 September 1916	26 October 1916	38 days	U.S. Army
4	William A. Mann	Major General; William A. Mann (1854–1934)	26 October 1916	26 November 1917	262 days	U.S. Army
5	Jesse McI. Carter	Major General; Jesse McI. Carter (1863–1930)	26 November 1917	15 August 1918	262 days	U.S. Army
-	John W. Heavey	Brigadier General; John W. Heavey (1867–1941); Acting	15 August 1918	5 February 1919	174 days	U.S. Army
5	Jesse McI. Carter	Major General; Jesse McI. Carter (1863–1930)	5 February 1919	28 June 1921	2 years, 143 days	U.S. Army
6	George C. Rickards	Major General; George C. Rickards (1860–1933)	29 June 1921	28 June 1925	3 years, 364 days	U.S. Army
7	Creed C. Hammond	Major General; Creed C. Hammond (1874–1940)	29 June 1925	28 June 1929	3 years, 364 days	U.S. Army
-	Ernest R. Redmond	Colonel; Ernest R. Redmond (1883–1966); Acting	29 June 1929	30 September 1929	93 days	U.S. Army
8	William G. Everson	Major General; William G. Everson (1879–1954)	1 October 1929	30 November 1931	2 years, 60 days	U.S. Army
9	George E. Leach	Major General; George E. Leach (1876–1955)	1 December 1931	30 November 1935	3 years, 364 days	U.S. Army
-	Herold J. Weiler	Colonel; Herold J. Weiler (1886–1945); Acting	1 December 1935	16 January 1936	46 days	U.S. Army
-	John F. Williams	Colonel; John F. Williams (1887–1953); Acting	17 January 1936	30 January 1936	13 days	U.S. Army
10	Albert H. Blanding	Major General; Albert H. Blanding (1876–1970)	31 January 1936	30 January 1940	4 years, 0 days	U.S. Army
11	John F. Williams	Major General; John F. Williams (1887–1953)	31 January 1940	30 January 1944	4 years, 0 days	U.S. Army
-	John F. Williams	Major General; John F. Williams (1887–1953); Acting	31 January 1944	31 January 1946	2 years, 0 days	U.S. Army
12	Butler B. Miltonberger	Major General; Butler B. Miltonberger (1897–1977)	1 February 1946	29 September 1947	1 year, 240 days	U.S. Army
13	Kenneth F. Cramer	Major General; Kenneth F. Cramer (1894–1954)	30 September 1947	4 September 1950	2 years, 339 days	U.S. Army
-	Raymond H. Fleming	Major General; Raymond H. Fleming (1889–1974); Acting	5 September 1950	13 August 1951	342 days	U.S. Army
14	Raymond H. Fleming	Major General; Raymond H. Fleming (1889–1974)	14 August 1951	15 February 1953	1 year, 185 days	U.S. Army
-	Earl T. Ricks	Major General; Earl T. Ricks (1908–1954); Acting	16 February 1953	21 June 1953	125 days	U.S. Air Force
15	Edgar C. Erickson	Major General; Edgar C. Erickson (1896–1989)	22 June 1953	31 May 1959	5 years, 342 days	U.S. Army
-	Winston P. Wilson	Major General; Winston P. Wilson (1911–1996); Acting	1 June 1959	19 July 1959	48 days	U.S. Air Force
16	Donald W. McGowan	Major General; Donald W. McGowan (1899–1967)	20 July 1959	30 August 1963	4 years, 41 days	U.S. Army
17	Winston P. Wilson	Major General; Winston P. Wilson (1911–1996)	31 August 1963	31 August 1971	8 years, 0 days	U.S. Air Force
18	Francis S. Greenlief	Major General; Francis S. Greenlief (1921–1999)	1 September 1971	23 June 1974	2 years, 295 days	U.S. Army
19	La Vern E. Weber	Lieutenant General; La Vern E. Weber (1923–1999)	16 August 1974	15 August 1982	7 years, 364 days	U.S. Army
20	Emmett H. Walker Jr.	Lieutenant General; Emmett H. Walker Jr. (1924–2007)	16 August 1982	15 August 1986	3 years, 364 days	U.S. Army
21	Herbert R. Temple Jr.	Lieutenant General; Herbert R. Temple Jr. (1928–2024)	16 August 1986	31 January 1990	3 years, 168 days	U.S. Army
22	John B. Conaway	Lieutenant General; John B. Conaway (born 1934)	1 February 1990	1 December 1993	3 years, 303 days	U.S. Air Force
-	Philip G. Killey	Major General; Philip G. Killey (born 1941); Acting	2 December 1993	1 January 1994	210 days	U.S. Air Force
-	Raymond F. Rees	Major General; Raymond F. Rees (born 1944); Acting	2 January 1994	31 July 1994	210 days	U.S. Army
-	John R. D'Araujo Jr.	Major General; John R. D'Araujo Jr. (born 1943); Acting	1 August 1994	30 September 1994	60 days	U.S. Army
23	Edward D. Baca	Lieutenant General; Edward D. Baca (1938–2020)	1 October 1994	31 July 1998	3 years, 303 days	U.S. Army
24	Russell C. Davis	Lieutenant General; Russell C. Davis (born 1938)	4 August 1998	3 August 2002	3 years, 364 days	U.S. Air Force
-	Raymond F. Rees	Major General; Raymond F. Rees (born 1944); Acting	4 August 2002	10 April 2003	249 days	U.S. Army
25	H Steven Blum	Lieutenant General; H Steven Blum (born 1946)	11 April 2003	17 November 2008	5 years, 220 days	U.S. Army
26	Craig R. McKinley	General; Craig R. McKinley (born 1952)	17 November 2008	6 September 2012	3 years, 294 days	U.S. Air Force
27	Frank J. Grass	General; Frank J. Grass (born 1951)	7 September 2012	3 August 2016	3 years, 331 days	U.S. Army
28	Joseph L. Lengyel	General; Joseph L. Lengyel (born 1959)	3 August 2016	3 August 2020	4 years, 0 days	U.S. Air Force
29	Daniel R. Hokanson	General; Daniel R. Hokanson (born 1963)	3 August 2020	2 August 2024	3 years, 365 days	U.S. Army
-	Jonathan Stubbs	Lieutenant General; Jonathan Stubbs (born 1972); Acting	5 August 2024	2 October 2024	58 days	U.S. Army
30	Steven S. Nordhaus	General; Steven S. Nordhaus (born 1966)	2 October 2024	Incumbent	2 years, 44 days	U.S. Air Force

== See also ==
- Senior Enlisted Advisor to the Chief of the National Guard Bureau
- Flag officer
