= Erasmus M. Weaver Jr. =

United States Army general

Erasmus Morgan Weaver Jr.
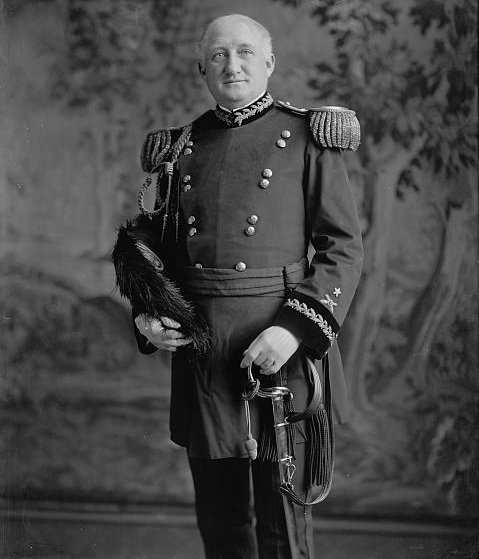
- Born: May 23, 1854; Lafayette, Indiana, US
- Died: November 13, 1920 (aged 66); Washington, D.C., US
- Burial place: Arlington National Cemetery
- Military career
- Branch: United States Army
- Service years: 1875–1918
- Rank: Major General
- Commands: Chief of the Militia Bureau; U.S. Army Coast Artillery Corps
- Conflicts: Spanish–American War; World War I

Erasmus Morgan Weaver Jr. (May 23, 1854 – November 13, 1920) was a United States Army major general who served as the first chief of the Militia Bureau and the Chief of the Army's Coast Artillery Corps. He was an 1875 graduate of the United States Military Academy and served in the Spanish–American War and World War I.

== Biography ==
The son of Erasmus M. Weaver, a prominent businessman of Lafayette, Indiana, Erasmus Morgan Weaver Jr. was born in Lafayette on 23 May 1854. He graduated from the United States Military Academy in 1875 and received his commission as a second lieutenant of Artillery.

Weaver's subsequent assignments included Professor of Military Science at Western Reserve University and The Citadel (1883–1885), and Instructor in Chemistry and Electricity at the United States Military Academy (1888–1891).

From 1895 to 1896, Weaver studied at the Massachusetts Institute of Technology.

In 1898, Weaver was appointed to the temporary grade of lieutenant colonel of the 5th Massachusetts Infantry, a volunteer regiment raised during the Spanish–American War. Initially the organization's mustering officer, he subsequently commanded its 1st Battalion.

From 1908 to 1911, Weaver served as a head of the Army's Militia Bureau, he was the first person to hold the position. In this assignment, he was responsible for overseeing the training and readiness of the National Guard.

Weaver was the Chief of the Coast Artillery Corps from 1911 until his retirement in 1918, when he was succeeded by Frank W. Coe. He was promoted to brigadier general in 1911 and major general in 1916. From 1917 until his retirement, he also served as a member of the War Council that the War Department created to oversee planning for World War I.

Weaver died in Washington, D.C., on November 13, 1920. He is buried in Arlington National Cemetery, Section SE, Site 1800.

General Weaver was the father of Major General Walter Reed Weaver (1885–1944).

Hawaii's Fort Weaver and Fort Weaver Road were named for him.

== Sources ==
- "General Weaver Retires". The New York Times. May 23, 1918.

Military offices
Preceded by Newly activated organization	Chief of the National Guard Bureau; 1908–1911	Succeeded by Robert K. Evans
