= Fordyce House =

Fordyce House may refer to:

- Fordyce House (Hot Springs, Arkansas), listed on the NRHP in Arkansas
- Fordyce–Ricks House Historic District Hot Springs, Arkansas, listed on the NRHP in Arkansas
- Fordyce House (Little Rock, Arkansas), listed on the NRHP in Arkansas
