= Donald McGowan =

Donald McGowan could be:

- Don McGowan (1938–2023), a Canadian television personality
- Donald W. McGowan (1899–1967), a United States Army Major General
