= General Finch =

General Finch may refer to:

- Edward Finch (British Army officer) (1756–1843), British Army general
- George G. Finch (1902–1986), U.S. Air National Guard major general
- Lionel Finch (1888–1982), British Army major general
