= Marksmanship ribbon =

United States Navy, Air Force, Space Force, and Coast Guard award

Marksmanship Ribbon
- US Navy Rifle Marksmanship Ribbon US Navy Pistol Marksmanship Ribbon US Air Force Small Arms Ribbon US Coast Guard Rifle Marksmanship Ribbon US Coast Guard Pistol Marksmanship Ribbon
- Type: Ribbon
- Awarded for: Marksmanship
- Presented by: Department of the Navy, Department of the Air Force, and United States Coast Guard
- Eligibility: All ranks
- Status: Current
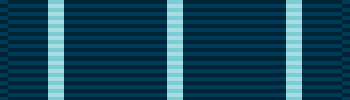
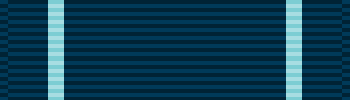
- Obsolete Marksmanship Ribbons Navy Distinguished Marksman and Pistol Shot Ribbon 1942-1951 Navy Distinguished Marksman Ribbon 1952-1959 Navy Distinguished Pistol Shot Ribbon 1952-1959 NOAA Corps Rifle Ribbon 1990-discontinued NOAA Corps Pistol Ribbon 1990-discontinued

A marksmanship ribbon is a United States Navy, Air Force, Space Force, Coast Guard and NOAA Commissioned Corps award that is issued to its members who pass a weapons qualification course and achieve an above-average score. Additionally, there are select state National Guard organizations that award marksmanship ribbons for high placement in state-level marksmanship competitions.

== U.S. Navy ==
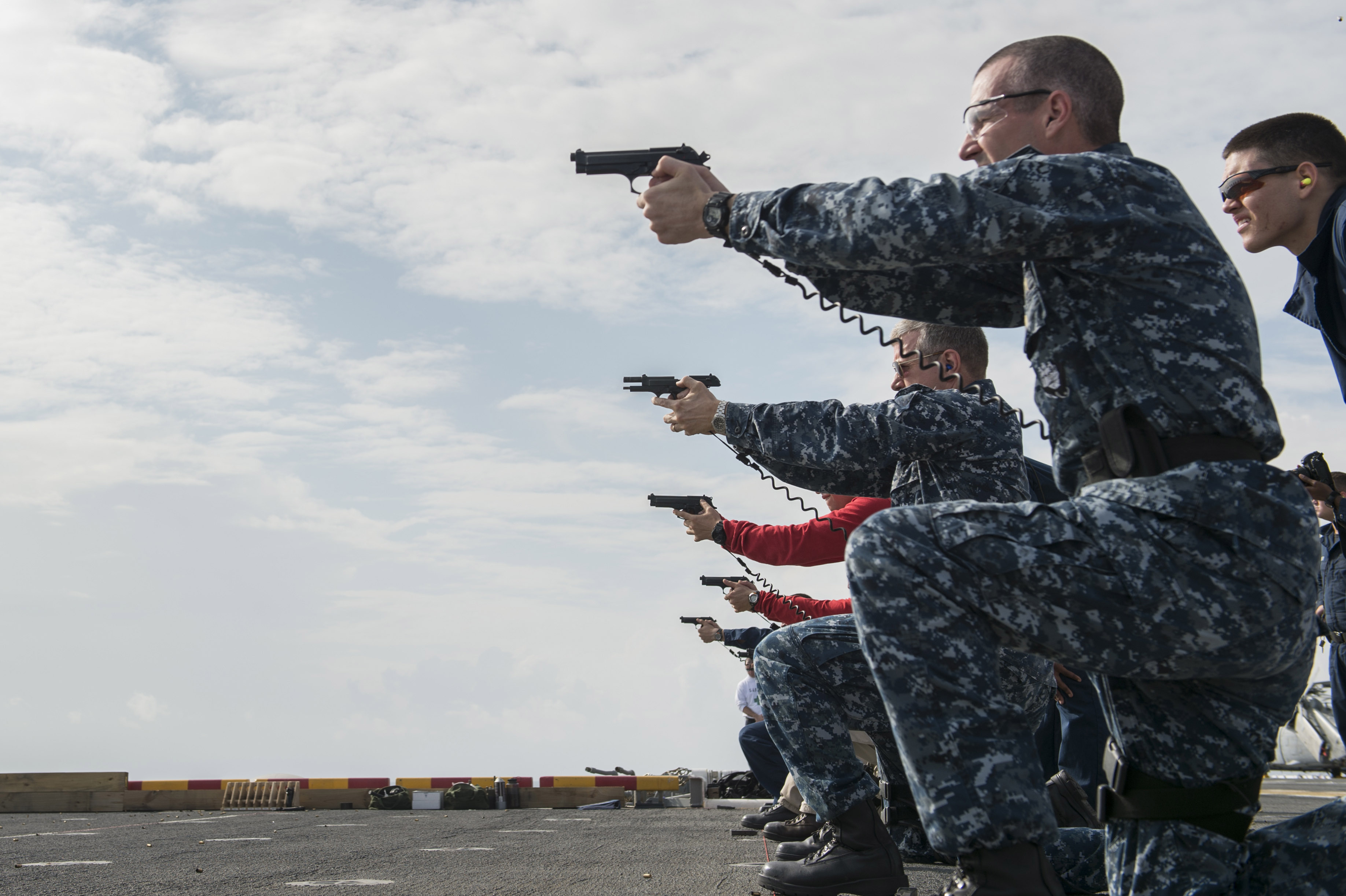
Small-arms Qualification Course exam aboard USS America

The U.S. Navy has issued these two marksmanship awards since 1920: the Navy Pistol Marksmanship Ribbon which is currently awarded for qualification on the Glock 19, 9mm pistol, and the Navy Rifle Marksmanship Ribbon which is currently awarded for qualification on the M4 variant.

The Navy issues the marksmanship ribbon in three levels of precedence: Expert, Sharpshooter, and Marksman. The basic ribbon is awarded for the Marksman level while the specific ribbon device is awarded for qualification as a Sharpshooter or Expert. Those receiving an Expert qualification receive the Marksmanship Medal and Marksmanship Ribbon.

Navy Marksmanship Levels
Rifle Expert	Rifle Sharpshooter	Rifle Marksman
Pistol Expert	Pistol Sharpshooter	Pistol Marksman

=== Retired ribbons ===
The Navy issued the Distinguished Marksman and Pistol Ribbon between 1942 and 1951 to recognize those who had earned a Distinguished Marksman or Pistol Shot Badge.

In 1952 the Secretary of the Navy ordered that the ribbon be divided into two new awards: the Distinguished Marksman Ribbon, to denote distinguished marksmanship with a rifle, and the Distinguished Pistol Shot Ribbon, to denote distinguished marksmanship with a pistol.

== U.S. Air Force and U.S. Space Force ==
The U.S. Air Force and U.S. Space Force awards a single ribbon, known as the Small Arms Expert Marksmanship Ribbon, for an expert qualification on either the M16 rifle, M4 carbine or the M9 or M17/18 pistol. The ribbon is issued in only one degree; however, a 3/16 inch bronze star may be worn on the ribbon for those who have qualified expert on both the service rifle and pistol. The ribbon was authorized by the Secretary of the Air Force on Aug. 28, 1962, and was awarded to all Air Force and Space Force members who qualified after Jan. 1, 1963. Prior to the conception of a ribbon, Air Force members were awarded with the United States Air Force Small Arms Marksmanship Certificate of Achievement (AF Form 1193 Jan 1961).

== U.S. Coast Guard ==
The U.S. Coast Guard Marksmanship Ribbons are issued under the same criteria as the U.S. Navy, but Coast Guardsmen use a .40 cal SIG Sauer P229R DAK pistol instead of the Navy's M9 pistol. The Coast Guard issues two ribbons, known as the Coast Guard Pistol Marksmanship Ribbon and the Coast Guard Rifle Marksmanship Ribbon. The ribbon device is awarded for qualification at the higher levels of sharpshooter and expert. Like the Navy, for those who receive an expert qualification, the Marksmanship Medal is awarded instead of the Marksmanship Ribbon.

== NOAA Commissioned Corps ==
The NOAA Commissioned Corps established a Rifle and Pistol Marksman ribbon April 17, 1990. The ribbon was awarded to any member of the NOAA Commissioned Corps who successfully completed training in any service-approved qualification course. No devices were authorized for wear on the NOAA ribbons to denote a specific level of qualification. The ribbon denoted qualification only.

== U.S. National Guard ==
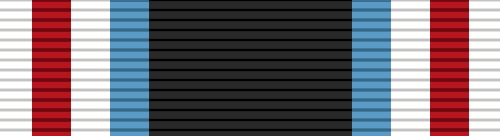
Missouri National Guard Governor's Twelve Ribbon

Once a year, thousands of U.S. Army and Air National Guard shooters (champion marksmanship teams from each state) compete against each other at the Winston P. Wilson Rifle and Pistol Championships. In the Missouri National Guard, the top twelve guardsmen selected to represent their state at the Winston P. Wilson matches are awarded the Governor's Twelve Ribbon which is worn on dress uniforms; any guardsman who earns the award more than once wear Hawthorn Cluster device(s) on top of the ribbon. In addition, these guardsman are awarded the Governor's Twelve Tab for wear on the combat uniform.

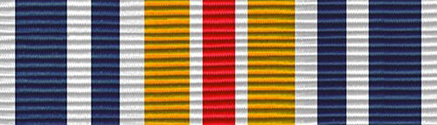
Missouri National Guard Adjutant General's Twenty Ribbon

Similarly, the Adjutant General of Missouri awards the Adjutant General's Twenty Ribbon to soldiers and airmen who qualify among the top twenty competitors at the Missouri State Combat Matches conducted each year; specifically the top eight combat rifle shooters, the top eight pistol shooters, the top two light machine gun teams, and the top two scout/sniper teams. In addition to this ribbon, these guardsman are also awarded the Adjutant General's Twenty Combat Badge for wear on the combat uniform.

Guardsmen are authorized to wear these ribbons as a permanent decoration on service dress uniforms, to the left of federal awards, when operating under Title 32 (state control) status. When federalized (Title 10), guardsman cannot wear these ribbons until they return to Title 32 status.

== Additional Information ==
The U.S. Army and U.S. Marine Corps provide weapons qualification badges instead of a marksmanship ribbon. For the services that award the marksmanship ribbon, re-qualification is not necessary once a service member has obtained the award, and the ribbon may be worn throughout an individual's career. In the Navy and Coast Guard, the marksmanship ribbon may be upgraded with a specific ribbon device if a higher qualification is achieved.

== See also ==
- Marksmanship Device
- Marksmanship Medal
- Marksmanship Badge (United States)
- Awards and decorations of the United States military
