= Earl T. Ricks =

United States Air Force general

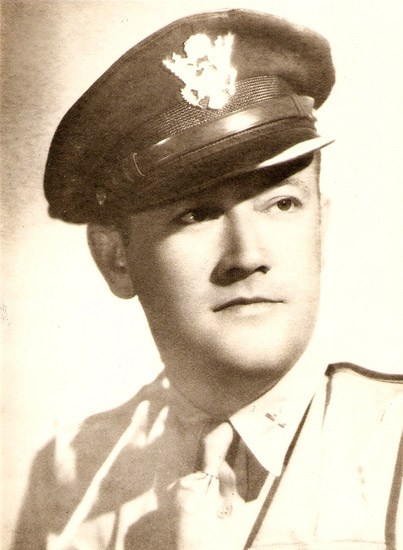
- Ricks in uniform, c. 1944
- Born: July 9, 1908; West Point, Mississippi, US
- Died: January 4, 1954 (aged 45); Walter Reed Hospital, Washington, D.C., US
- Military career
- Allegiance: United States
- Branch: United States Air Force
- Service years: 1940–1954
- Rank: Major General
- Nickname: "Pappy Ricks"
- Commands: Air Force Division; Arkansas National Guard; Payne Field; 36th Strategic Air Base
- Conflicts: World War II
- Awards: Legion of Merit; Air Medal; Army Commendation Medal
- Other work: Mayor of Hot Springs, Arkansas (1947–49)

Earl T. Ricks (July 9, 1908 – January 4, 1954) was a senior officer of the United States Air National Guard who served as deputy chief of the National Guard Bureau, chief of the Air Force Division, National Guard Bureau (1950–1954), and acting chief of the National Guard Bureau. His four months as acting bureau chief made him the first Air National Guard officer to hold the position.

== Early life and education ==
Earl Thornton Ricks was born in West Point, Mississippi, and reared in Stamps in Lafayette County in southwestern Arkansas. Attracted to flying from an early age, he graduated from Parks College of Engineering, Aviation and Technology in St. Louis, Missouri, purchased a biplane and became a pilot. In 1930 Ricks married Hazel Brown, daughter of a partner in Bodcaw Lumber, the largest lumber company in the world at the time. They had four children. In 1935 he moved to Hot Springs and became partners with Raymond Clinton (brother of Bill Clinton's adoptive father Roger Clinton Sr.) in the Ricks-Clinton Buick car dealership.

== World War II ==
In March 1940, Ricks joined the Arkansas National Guard as a member of the 154th Observation Squadron, and soon received his commission as a second lieutenant. In September he entered federal service as a member of the 17th Bombardment Group. In 1941 he was named commander of the 36th Strategic Air Base in Miami, Florida, the departure point for soldiers deploying to North Africa. Ricks subsequently received appointment as Commander of Payne Airfield in Cairo, Egypt.

Promoted to colonel in April 1944, Ricks was assigned as deputy commander of the Southwest Pacific Wing, Air Transport Command, operating in Australia, New Guinea, and the Philippines. At the end of the Pacific campaign, Ricks piloted the Japanese delegation from Ie Shima to Manila to receive surrender terms from General of the Army Douglas MacArthur. Ricks served in the post-war occupation of Japan, and oversaw the landing of two occupation divisions at Atsugi airdrome in Yokohama.

== Cold War ==
After the war, Ricks returned to his Hot Springs car dealership and started a charter flying service. He became involved in politics as a member of a group of veterans, led by Raymond Clinton and Sidney McMath, which attempted to overthrow the political organization led by Mayor Leo McLaughlin. This veterans group, the "GIs", prevailed in the 1946 municipal elections, and Ricks won the contest for mayor. He served one term, 1947 to 1949, and made efforts to change Hot Springs' reputation as a "sin city" of gambling and vice, while also carrying out a program of improvements to roads, water and sanitation systems.

In 1948 McMath won election as governor. In 1949 he appointed Ricks as adjutant general of the Arkansas National Guard, and Ricks was promoted to brigadier general. In 1950 Ricks was appointed Chief of the Air Force Division at the National Guard Bureau and deputy chief of the National Guard Bureau, receiving promotion to major general. In early to mid-1953 Ricks served four months as the acting Chief of the National Guard Bureau, following the retirement of Raymond H. Fleming. Ricks was diagnosed with cancer in 1953 and had a tumor removed from his leg. He did not recover, and died at Walter Reed Army Medical Center on January 4, 1954.

== Legacy ==
The 188th Fighter Wing was nicknamed "Ricks' Rippers". Ricks was inducted into the Arkansas Aviation Hall of Fame in 1983. The Air National Guard's annual award for best unit airmanship is called the Earl T. Ricks Award. The National Guard armory in Little Rock, Arkansas is named for him. In the 1950s and 1960s the Air National Guard conducted an annual Ricks Memorial Trophy contest, a cross country timed air race designed to showcase the capabilities of the newly formed Air National Guard. Ricks bought the home of spa and railroad entrepreneur Samuel W. Fordyce in 1932. Still privately owned, in 2003 the 14-room log structure and the nearly 500 acres that adjoin it were designated the Fordyce-Ricks House Historic District by the National Register of Historic Places.

== Awards and decorations ==
Ricks was a recipient of the Legion of Merit and the Air Medal.

== See also ==
- List of Arkansas adjutants general

Military offices
Preceded by Brigadier General Heber L. McAlister	Adjutant General of Arkansas; 1949–1950	Succeeded by Brigadier General Heber L. McAlister
Preceded by Major General George G. Finch	Chief of the Air Force Division, National Guard Bureau; 1950–1954	Succeeded by Major General Winston P. Wilson
Preceded by Major General Raymond H. Fleming	Chief of the National Guard Bureau; Acting; 1953	Succeeded by Major General Edgar C. Erickson
