= Francis Greenlief =

United States Army general (1921–1999)

Francis S. Greenlief
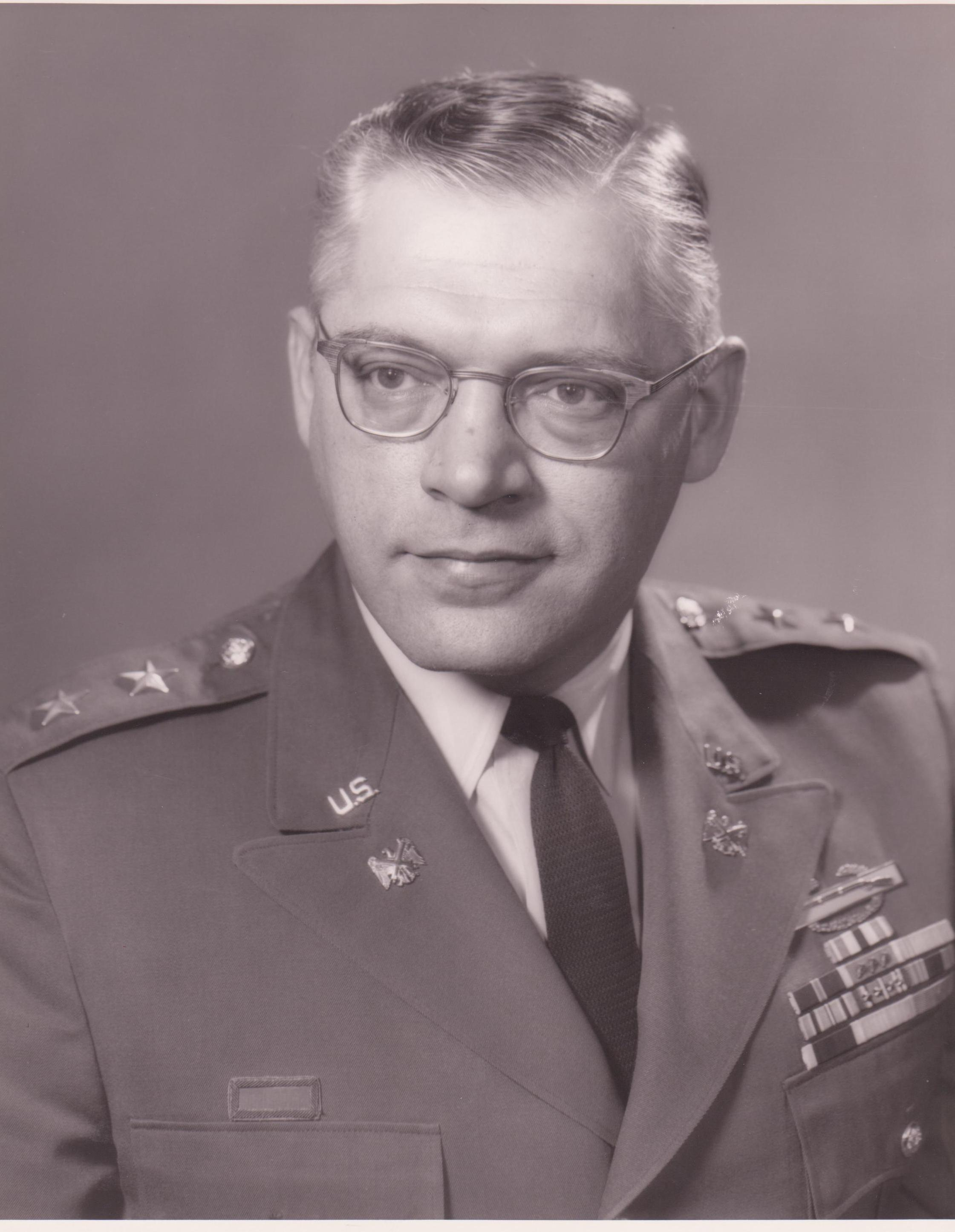
- Major General Greenlief as National Guard bureau chief
- Born: July 27, 1921; Hastings, Nebraska, U.S.
- Died: December 19, 1999 (aged 78); Falls Church, Virginia, U.S.
- Burial place: Arlington National Cemetery
- Military career
- Allegiance: United States of America
- Branch: United States Army
- Service years: 1940–1974
- Rank: Major General
- Units: Nebraska National Guard; National Guard Bureau
- Commands: Army National Guard; National Guard Bureau
- Conflicts: World War II
- Awards: Combat Infantryman Badge; Army Distinguished Service Medal; Air Force Distinguished Service Medal; Silver Star Medal; Bronze Star Medal; Purple Heart; Army Good Conduct Medal; American Defense Service Medal; American Campaign Medal; European-African-Middle Eastern Campaign Medal; World War II Victory Medal; Army of Occupation Medal
- Other work: Executive vice president, National Guard Association of the United States

Major General Francis S. Greenlief (July 27, 1921 – December 19, 1999) was a major general in the United States Army. He served as the 18th Chief of the National Guard Bureau.

== Early life and education ==
Francis Stevens Greenlief was born in Hastings, Nebraska, on July 27, 1921. He graduated from Hastings High School in the spring of 1938 and then played football as a guard for the University of Nebraska. He enlisted in his hometown Nebraska National Guard unit (Company G, 134th Infantry Regiment, 35th Division) on July 6, 1940, and was given permission to attend weekly drills with Company I, based in Lincoln, while he was attending school. He was unable to compete in the 1941 Rose Bowl when the Nebraska National Guard was mobilized in December 1940 prior to World War II.

== World War II ==
By the spring of 1942, Greenlief had been promoted to company first sergeant and was accepted to attend Infantry Officer Candidate School at Fort Benning, Georgia. After graduating on 25 August 1942, he served as an instructor, and was then reassigned to the 134th Infantry at his own request. He served as a platoon leader, and later company commander of Company L, 134th Infantry. He participated in the liberation of Saint-Lô during Operation Overlord, the Battle of the Bulge, and the American advance into Germany. During the war, Greenlief earned a Silver Star, a Bronze Star Medal, four Purple Hearts, the Combat Infantryman Badge, the European-African-Middle Eastern Campaign Medal with four battle stars, and the Croix de Guerre of France.

== Post-World War II ==
Greenlief left active duty as a captain on January 5, 1946, and held a commission in the Officers' Reserve Corps as a captain from October 29, 1945, to February 6, 1948. On November 3, 1947, Greenlief returned to the Nebraska National Guard as a captain and company commander of Company G, 134th Infantry Regiment. Greenlief continued to advance through command and staff assignments in Nebraska, including Chief of Staff of the 34th Infantry Division and acting assistant adjutant general of Nebraska. On September 21, 1953, he was promoted to lieutenant colonel. He graduated from the United States Army Command and General Staff College in 1955.

== National Guard Bureau ==
Greenlief was a colonel when he began his career at the National Guard Bureau on January 1, 1960, as executive officer of the Army Division. He served as chief of the Army Division from November 3, 1962, to September 13, 1963, as a brigadier general, and was succeeded by Charles L. Southward. On September 14, 1963, he became deputy director of the National Guard Bureau. On October 19, 1964, Greenlief was promoted to major general. In 1970 the position of director of the Army National Guard was created as a major general's position, and Greenlief was selected, succeeding Leonard C. Ward, who had been serving as chief of the Army Division. The position of deputy director was also created as a brigadier general's assignment, and Ward was selected

In 1969, Greenlief qualified in the Aviation branch and received the Army Aviator Badge.

He served as chief of the National Guard Bureau from 1971 to 1974. During his time as chief, Greenlief pushed for a more active role for the National Guard within the United States Army, better benefits and equipment for National Guard soldiers, and for increased minority recruitment. The number of African-American guardsmen more than tripled during his tenure.

In 1974, Greenlief partnered with Norwegian Maj. Gen. Herluf Nygaard to establish the Minnesota–Norway National Guard Partnership.

== Awards and decorations ==
In addition to his World War II combat awards, Greenlief was a recipient of the Army Distinguished Service Medal and Air Force Distinguished Service Medal.

In 1999 the Governor of Nebraska announced that Greenlief had received a state promotion to lieutenant general to acknowledge his long service and superior performance of duty.

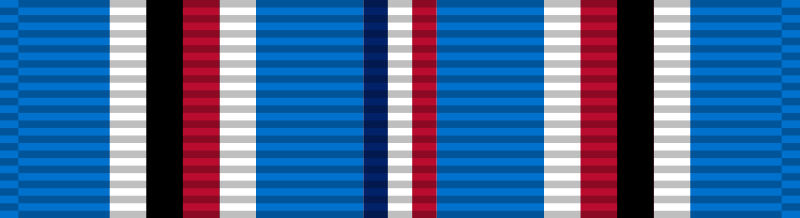

Combat Infantryman Badge
Army Distinguished Service Medal		Air Force Distinguished Service Medal
Silver Star Medal	Bronze Star Medal	Purple Heart with three bronze oak leaf clusters
Army Good Conduct Medal	American Defense Service Medal	American Campaign Medal
European-African-Middle Eastern Campaign Medal with one silver service star	World War II Victory Medal	Army of Occupation Medal with Germany clasp

== Post-military career ==
From 1974 to 1984, Greenlief served as executive vice president of the National Guard Association of the United States. He later worked as a consultant for several defense contracting firms, including United Defense of York, Pennsylvania. He retired to Oakton, Virginia.

== Death ==
Greenlief died from cancer at Inova Fairfax Hospital in Falls Church, Virginia on December 19, 1999. His body lies in Arlington National Cemetery.

== Legacy ==
The Nebraska National Guard's facility in Hastings is named the Francis S. Greenlief Training Site.

The Army National Guard presents the annual Francis S. Greenlief Award for Excellence in Aviation.

Military offices
Preceded by Winston P. Wilson	Chief of the National Guard Bureau; 1971–1974	Succeeded by La Vern E. Weber
