= Minnesota–Norway National Guard Partnership =

Minnesota-Norway State Partnership
- Part of the U.S. European Command State Partnership Program
- Minnesota Norway
- Origin: 21 February 2023
- Prime minister: Jonas Gahr Støre
- Minister of defense: Bjørn Arild Gram
- Ambassador to U.S.: Anniken Krutnes
- Ambassador to Norway: Marc Nathanson
- State Governor: Tim Walz
- Adjutant general: Major General (MN) Shawn P. Manke
- NATO member: Yes (4 April 1949)
- EU member: No

Europe-Norway

The Minnesota–Norway National Guard Partnership is one of 25 European partnerships that make up the U.S. European Command State Partnership Program and one of 88 worldwide partnerships that make-up the National Guard's State Partnership Program.The Minnesota National Guard has partnered with the Norwegian Home Guard since 1974, based on a handshake between two WWII veterans- Norwegian Maj. Gen. Herluf Nygaard and U.S. Maj. Gen. Francis S. Greenlief. The partnership was recognized by the SPP on 21 February 2023.

Minnesota and Norway refer to their partnership as the Norwegian Reciprocal Troop Exchange (NOREX). Each year, the Norwegian Home Guard sends a contingent to train with the Minnesota National Guard, often at Camp Ripley. They also attend cultural events in Minnesota to strengthen relationships between the United States and Norway. In return, the Minnesota National Guard sends a group of soldiers and airmen to train in Norway.

NOREX soldiers at Camp Ripley main gate	NOREX personnel learn water survival techniques.
MN National Guard and Norwegian Home Guard conclude NOREX53	Ski marching up a Norwegian mountain.
Additional NOREX photos.
