= 16th Photographic Squadron =

- Active: 1942–1944; 1947
- Country: United States
- Branch: United States Air Force
- Role: Reconnaissance

Commanders
- Notable commanders: Winston P. Wilson

Insignia
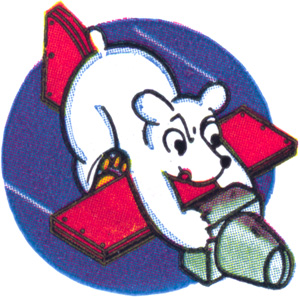
- 16th Photographic Squadron emblem (approved 29 March 1943) (Note: A white caricatured bear, grasping a black aerial camera proper in the forepaws, leaning and diving through space on a wing section formed by two red planks, and having a tail rudder of the same material, all emitting white speed lines and mounted on a light blue disc. Maurer, Combat Squadrons, p. 90.)

The 16th Photographic Squadron is an inactive United States Air Force unit. It was last assigned to the 55th Reconnaissance Group at MacDill Field, Florida, where it was inactivated on 16 December 1947. It served as a mapping unit during World War II and the initial years of Strategic Air Command

== History ==
Initially activated in March 1942 at Bolling Field as a laboratory for processing photographic products produced by the 1st Mapping Group. During World War II, the squadron was engaged in photographic mapping of areas of the United States with a variety of aircraft.

The squadron moved to Buckley Field in late 1944, where it was assigned to the 311th Photographic Wing, which became the major reconnaissance organization of Strategic Air Command (SAC). It moved with the wing to MacDill Field, Florida in April 1946 and was assigned to the 55th Reconnaissance Group in 1947. The squadron was engaged in SAC's strategic mapping mission. The 16th was inactivated in December and its personnel and equipment were transferred to the 16th Photographic Reconnaissance Squadron (Special), which was simultaneously activated.

== Lineage ==
- Constituted as the Photographic Laboratory Unit on 27 March 1942
- Activated on 31 March 1942
- Redesignated 16th Photographic Squadron on 8 July 1942
- Redesignated 16th Photographic Unit on 1 February 1943
- Redesignated 16th Domestic Photographic Unit on 11 August 1943
- Redesignated 16th Photographic Squadron (Special Purpose) on 14 September 1944
- Inactivated on 16 December 1947

=== Assignments ===
- 1st Mapping Group (later 1at Photographic Charting Group), 31 March 1942
- 11th Photographic Group, 1 December 1943
- 311th Photographic Wing, 5 October 1944
- 55th Reconnaissance Group, 1 Jun 1947 – 16 Dec 1947

=== Stations ===
- Bolling Field, District of Columbia, 31 March 1942
- Buckley Field, Colorado, 1 November 1944
- MacDill Field, Florida, 19 April 1946 – 16 December 1947

=== Aircraft ===
- Cessna C-78 Bobcat (1942–1944)
- Beechcraft C-45 Expeditor (1944–1947)
- Beechcraft F-2 Expeditor (1944–1947)
- Boeing B-17 Flying Fortress (1946–1947)
- Boeing F-9 Flying Fortress (1946–1947)
- Consolidated OA-10 Catalina (1943)
- Grumman OA-13 Goose (1943)
- Beechcraft AT-7 Navigator(1943)
- Beechcraft AT-11 Kansan (1943–1946)
- Boeing F-13 Superfortress (1947)

=== Service Streamer ===
Campaign Streamer	Campaign	Dates	Notes
	American Theater without inscription	31 March 1942 – 2 March 1946	

== See also ==
- List of B-29 Superfortress operators
