= Leo McLaughlin =

American politician (1888–1958)

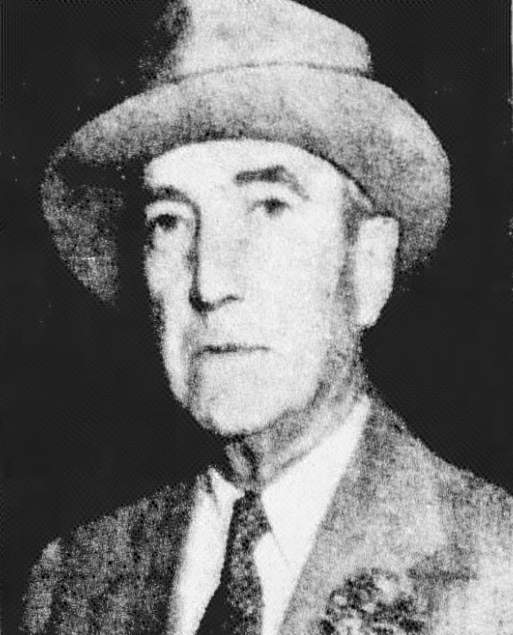
- McLaughlin in 1952

Mayor of Hot Springs, Arkansas
- In office 1927–1947
- Succeeded by: Earl T. Ricks

City attorney of Hot Springs, Arkansas
- In office April 8, 1912 – April 10, 1916
- Preceded by: J. A. Stallcup
- Succeeded by: Jas S. McConnell
- In office April 8, 1918 – 1918
- Preceded by: Jas S. McConnell
- Succeeded by: Orlando H. Sumpter
- In office 1919–~1927
- Preceded by: Orlando H. Sumpter

Member of the Arkansas House of Representatives from Garland County
- In office January 12, 1911 – 1912

Personal details
- Born: Leo Patrick McLaughlin; June 5, 1888 Hot Springs, Arkansas, U.S.
- Died: May 5, 1958 (aged 69)
- Party: Democratic
- Spouses: Juanita Gilliam (m. 1918; div. 1921) Mary Francis Frink (m. 1931; div. 1931) Florence Paul (m. 1931; div. 1936)
- Education: University of Arkansas (attended)

Military service
- Allegiance: United States
- Branch/service: United States Army
- Years of service: 1918–1919
- Rank: Corporal

Leo Patrick McLaughlin (June 5, 1888 – May 5, 1958) was an American politician who served as the mayor of Hot Springs, Arkansas, from 1927 to 1947, and in the Arkansas House of Representatives in 1911. He was the head of a political machine in Garland County, Arkansas.

McLaughlin was born in Hot Springs in 1888, and was educated at Hot Springs High School and attended the University of Arkansas for two weeks. He entered politics in the 1910s as a member of the state house before being elected as city attorney in Hot Springs. He left politics temporarily after being drafted into the United States Army, but returned to the position of city attorney.

During McLaughlin's tenure, illegal gambling was rampant and criminals – such as Al Capone and Lucky Luciano – received protection. His opponents, under the leadership of Sid McMath, defeated members of his political machine in the 1946 election and took the mayoralty in the 1947 election after McLaughlin dropped out due to an investigation. The charges against him were dropped and he unsuccessfully attempted to return to politics before dying in 1958.

== Early life and education ==
Leo Patrick McLaughlin was born in Hot Springs, Arkansas, on June 5, 1888, as one of eight children of John Henry McLaughlin and Bridget Adela Russell. John was born in March 1842, and resided in County Offaly before immigrating to Maryland during the Great Famine in 1850. John married Bridget, whose family immigrated from Ireland after the American Civil War, in 1873. John operated a grocery store with his brother in Memphis, Tennessee, before selling it in 1878, and moving to Hot Springs. John was one of the largest real estate owners in the town.

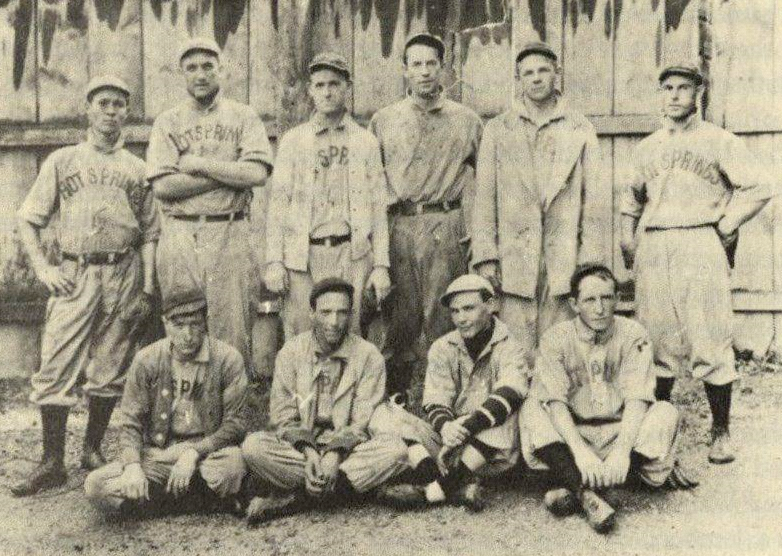
The Hot Springs Bathers in 1916. Leo McLaughlin is in the back row second from the left.

McLaughlin was christened on July 1, 1888. In high school, he was a member of the football and basketball teams and convinced American baseball player Honus Wagner to referee the first basketball game held in Hot Springs on December 31, 1907. He graduated from Hot Springs High School in 1908, and was president in his senior year. He was a member of the Hot Springs Bathers in 1912.

McLaughlin attended the University of Arkansas for two weeks in 1908. He never took a bar examination, but studied law under George P. Whittington, a lawyer and member of the Arkansas House of Representatives, and worked as a lawyer for 45 years. He was able to work as lawyer despite not being admitted to the bar due to lax regulations and his association with Whittington.

== Career ==
=== State politics ===
McLaughlin was an alternate delegate to the Democratic Party of Arkansas' state convention in 1910, a delegate to the 1914 convention, and a delegate to the 1948 Democratic National Convention.

Whittington convinced McLaughlin to run with him for seats representing Garland County in the state house. Due to his youth, McLaughlin knew little about political issues and took safe positions on issues, such as allowing counties to vote on whether or not they wanted a prohibition of alcohol. They defeated four other candidates for the Democratic nominations and won in the 1910 election. McLaughlin, at age 22, was the youngest member of the state house. He served on the Judiciary, Banks and Banking, and Natural Resources committee.

McLaughlin supported Stephen Brundidge Jr. for the Democratic gubernatorial nomination in 1913 and later supported George Washington Hays. He supported Governor Carl E. Bailey's campaign for a seat in the United States Senate in the 1937 special election and put forward the motion to have the Democratic nomination be given to Bailey. Bailey lost the election, but won in Hot Springs. McLaughlin supported Bailey for reelection in the 1940 gubernatorial election, but he lost to Homer Martin Adkins. He led Attorney General Jack Wilson Holt Sr.'s campaign in Garland County during the 1942 U.S. Senate election.

=== Local politics ===
McLaughlin received the Democratic nomination to run for city attorney of Hot Springs and defeated Sam McConnell, a member of the Republican Party who ran as an independent, in the 1912 election. He was the youngest person elected as city attorney at that time. He succeeded J. A. Stallcup as the city attorney. During the 1915 election McLaughlin's opponent Peyton T. Jordan attacked him for not having a law degree as it meant he could not represent the city before the Arkansas Supreme Court.

McLaughlin grew unpopular due to his opposition to the construction of a sanatorium on land owned by his family. He won the Democratic primary in December 1915, which was normally tantamount to election. James McConnell, a Republican running as an independent and with the support of Mayor Jacob W. McClendon, defeated McLaughlin in the 1916 election.

After the United States joined World War I, McLaughlin was eligible to be drafted into the United States Army and underwent a pre-induction physical on January 24, 1918. McLaughlin defeated James McConnell and Sam Garrett in the 1918 election. He hoped that winning the election would prevent him from being drafted, but he was drafted on May 27. He reported to Camp Beauregard, where he was assigned to Company G of the 156th Infantry Regiment and then the 114th Field Signal Battalion. His unit was transported from New Jersey to France by the USS Leviathan in September 1918, but the armistice occurred before his unit was sent to combat. He was promoted to corporal before his honorable discharge on April 26, 1919.

Orlando H. Sumpter was elected to replace him until McLaughlin reassumed the office after his military service. McLaughlin defeated Sumpter and Sidney S. Taylor in the 1920 election; all of the candidates ran as independents due to a lack of a primary. He faced no opposition in 1922.

McLaughlin was a member of the Garland County Democratic Central Committee and was selected to be its secretary in 1912. He served as the party's chair and Jacob L. King, a member of McLaughlin's opposition, succeeded him as chair in 1948.

== Mayoralty ==
=== Elections ===
Mayor Jacob W. McClendon died in 1921, and McLaughlin considered seeking the appointment to replace him, but declined due to other strong candidates seeking the position; Harry A. Jones was selected to fill the vacancy. McLaughlin supported J. B. Shaw against Jones in the 1925 election.

Sidney Nutt won the Democratic mayoral primary without opposition in December 1926. Vernal Ledgerwood, who was elected municipal judge in 1917, asked Nutt to replace Chief of Police William Brandenburg upon taking office, but Nutt refused. Ledgerwood and Whittington met and convinced McLaughlin to run for mayor as an independent. McLaughlin defeated Nutt in the 1927 election. Ledgerwood administered the oath of office for McLaughlin. McLaughlin appointed Davies, Ledgerwood's law partner, to succeed himself as city attorney.

In the 1929 election McLaughlin defeated Cleveland Smith, the city engineer. There was no opposition to McLaughlin in the 1931 election, the first time in the city's history that an incumbent mayor had no opponent. There was an attempt to draft Martin A. Eisele during the 1933 campaign, but he refused to run; a write-in campaign for Eisele had received 1,044 votes. McLaughlin defeated Elmer Tackett, a former member of the state house, in the 1937 election. McLaughlin was accused of electoral fraud during his tenure, with allegations of paying people's poll taxes and threatening to fire government workers who did not vote. A federal grand jury reported in 1942 that "every provision required by the State's statutes for the preservation and protection of the ballot was wholly ignored and violated."

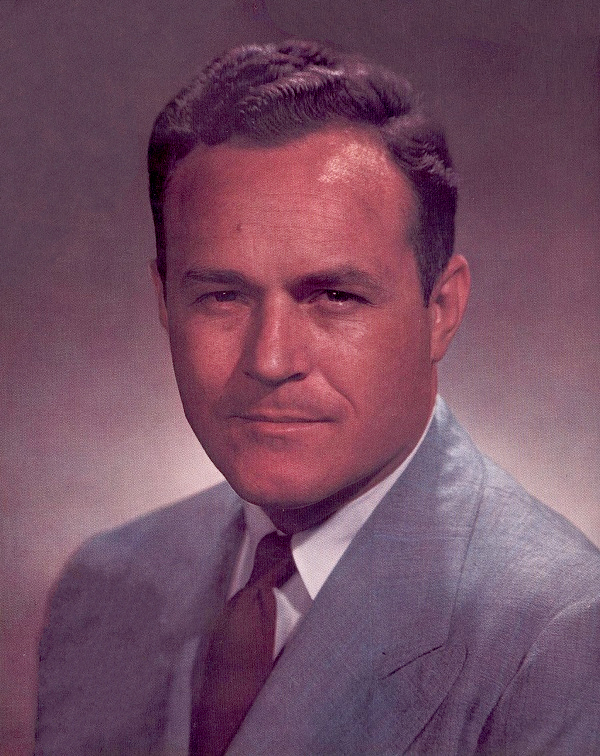
Sid McMath was an opponent of McLaughlin and the lawsuit that rejected thousands of poll tax receipts.

Sid McMath was one of the leading opponents against McLaughlin's political machine. McMath formed and led the Government Improvement League, which was made up almost entirely of veterans, in 1945. McLaughlin's opponents, with McMath as one of their lawyers, challenged the receipts of 3,825 poll taxes, accounting for over one-third of the number in the 1946 Democratic primary. Judge John E. Miller ruled that 1,607 of the poll taxes were invalid. McLaughlin had previously opposed Miller during the 1937 U.S. Senate election and did not attend the hearing. The GI League won all of the county elections in the 1946 election except for constable and state senate. Ledgerwood stated in a post-election radio address that McLaughlin's political machine was over and Ledgerwood did not seek reelection in 1947. The 1946 election saw the highest turnout in the history of Garland County.

McLaughlin filed to run in the 1947 election, but later announced that he would not seek reelection after a grand jury launched an investigation into his administration. Earl T. Ricks defeated Clyde Wilson, who received McLaughlin's support, in the election.

=== Tenure ===
Mayor W. W. Waters and Sheriff R. L. Williams instituted a crackdown on gambling clubs in Hot Springs in 1913. McLaughlin wanted to make Hot Springs open to gambling and appointed local gambler William Stokley Jacobs to oversee the resumption of gambling in the town. Jacobs was respected by both civil society and the gambling community. The reintroduction of gambling clubs in Hot Springs started with the Southern Club, which Jacobs held an ownership stake in. Jacobs opened his own gambling club, Belvedere, in 1929, and held interests in six clubs by the time of his death in 1940. In 1941, McLaughlin reported to a grand jury that Hot Springs took in $250,365 in gambling fines between April 10, 1927, and June 30, 1941.

Governor Junius Marion Futrell was a friend of Ledgerwood. McLaughlin and Ledgerwood wanted to reintroduce horse racing and were told by Futrell that he would sign a bill to legalize it. In 1934, Eugene Hampton proposed legislation to legalize horse racing and it was signed into law by Futrell.

A political machine was operated in the city and county by McLaughlin, Earl Witt, and Ledgerwood. Illegal gambling was sanctioned in the city with fees being paid to the local government to avoid police raids and McLaughlin advertised the city as a place to gamble. Governor Adkins attempted to crack down on gambling in the 1940s, but politicians like Garland County Prosecuting Attorney Curtis Ridgway had gamblers as their most prolific supporters.

Criminals, such as Al Capone and Lucky Luciano, received protection from law enforcement by McLaughlin's Hot Springs government. Meyer Lansky, Bugsy Siegel, Dutch Schultz, Legs Diamond, Frank Costello, and other criminals frequented Hot Springs. Joe Wakelin, Ledgerwood's brother-in-law, was appointed chief of police in 1927, and convicted for harboring Alvin Karpis. McMath claimed that Hot Springs had more gangsters in its winter season than New York City, Chicago, or Las Vegas.

George, the brother of Leo McLaughlin, operated slot machines in Hot Springs in the 1930s. Sidney B. Long won an $18 jackpot from one of George's machines on January 21, 1933, after using slugs. Dick Galatas, a close friend of Leo and later a participant in the Kansas City massacre, was contacted by George for help dealing with Long. Witnesses saw Galatas restraining a visibly bruised Long before Long was knocked to the ground by George pistol-whipping him. Long was admitted to the Army Navy General Hospital before dying from blood poisoning on January 26. George was indicted for Long's death while charges against Galatas and others involved were dropped. Whittington and Richard Ryan were George's defense attorneys. Six of the prosecution's witnesses were unable to be located for testimony. Roy Crowford, a son of one of the jurors, was given a job in the fire department on Leo's recommendation five days after the trial ended. Carl Wilson, a member of the board of aldermen from the second ward and close friend of Leo, was one of the jurors. The jury acquitted George.

Weldon Rasberry was appointed by McLaughlin to replace Wakelin as chief of police in 1937. Rasberry had no prior law enforcement experience and had previously worked at the fire department for 17 years. The position of Commissioner of Public Safety was created for Rasberry a month later due to the death of Fire Chief Loyd Tate. Rasberry gained the ire of both departments due to his lack of law enforcement experience and previous low ranking of lieutenant in the fire department.

Several infrastructure projects were undertaken during McLaughlin's tenure as mayor. Hot Springs frequently suffered from flooding before the storm drain system was enlarged on Central Avenue and Park Avenue. City hall needed a new roof, but the city was unable to afford the $5,000 for repairs; McLaughlin used revenue from gambling for a new roof. Four of the town's six banks failed during the Great Depression.

In 1941, the Chamber of Commerce presented a plan to the Hot Springs city council for the town to obtain federal funding for a new airport to replace the existing one with two small dirt runways. This new airport, budgeted at $2 million, would have two concrete runways 6,000 feet in length and 150 feet in width. McLaughlin was uninterested in the project, but councilor Frank N. Moody successfully pushed for it to be named McLaughlin Field in 1942. McLaughlin appointed Moody as chair for the opening of the airport on November 20, 1946. Raymond Clinton, an opponent of McLaughlin, obtained over 2,000 signatures for a petition calling for the airport to be renamed in memory of those who died in World War II. A petition with 7,000 signatures requesting the airport's name be changed was presented after Ricks took office as mayor. The airport was renamed to Hot Springs Memorial Field in 1947, and a rededication event was held on May 30, 1947.

== Later life and death ==
A grand jury indicted McLaughlin on four charges of bribery, two charges of conversion of city funds, and a charge of failure to file a city financial report on March 18, 1947, and was given a bond of $40,500. His brother George, secretary Hazel Marsh, and Elmer Walters were also indicted. Additional charges were filed against McLaughlin, including robbery. Henry Donham and C. Floyd Huff were McLaughlin's attorneys. He was acquitted on one charge and the remainder were dismissed. During the trial Leo defended George being on the city's payroll by claiming that he hired George as an undercover agent in 1937, and that was the reason why government officials did not know what George did for his salary; laughter broke out in the courtroom due to George's reputation of incompetence. A lawsuit attempting to remove him as chair of the Garland County Democratic Central Committee was withdrawn due to McLaughlin leaving office.

McLaughlin attempted to reenter politics after his mayoral tenure by running for city attorney as an independent in the 1952 election, but failed to qualify. He suffered from poor health starting in 1951, and had nephritis. He was hospitalized due to influenza in April 1958, and died on May 5, 1958, due to uremia. His two living sisters, Elizabeth and Stella, sold the McLaughlin family residence in 1960, and it was looted by vandals. Stella's estate was worth $668,000 (equivalent to $5,311,000 in 2025) when she died in 1971.

== Personal life ==
John William McLaughlin, McLaughlin's brother, was elected to the board of aldermen from the 2nd ward. After McLaughlin lost reelection in 1916, his brother George started to criticize McClendon and threatened to shoot him. McClendon threatened to shoot George while he was working as an election judge in a school board election in 1916, and was convicted for aggravated assault resulting in a sentence of one hour in jail and a $50 fine. His sister Mary Anna died from the Spanish flu in February 1917.

On June 19, 1918, McLaughlin married Juanita Gilliam in Rapides Parish, Louisiana. She filed for divorce on September 5, 1919, in Denver, Colorado, and a judgement was made in her favor on November 18, although it was not finalized until June 2, 1921. In 1931, McLaughlin married Mary Francis Frink. They lived together for four months before Frink requested a divorce. Frink was given $6,500 (equivalent to $138,000 in 2025) in the divorce. He married Florence Paul, a Texas socialite, on November 4, 1931, the same day his previous marriage ended, and divorced her in 1936. McLaughlin started dating the 25-year-old Verna Lucille Griffith in August 1941. They planned to marry on October 1, 1944, but McLaughlin backed away. Lucille filed a breach of promise lawsuit against McLaughlin, but the jury acquitted him.

McLaughlin's divorce papers in 1935 stated that he was earning $60,000 (equivalent to $1,185,874 in 2021) per year. In 1937, Paul claimed during their divorce proceedings that McLaughlin's estate was worth $500,000 (equivalent to $11,198,000 in 2025). He was the president of the Hot Springs Broadcasting Company, which was formed to prevent the removal of the KTHS station.

Fred Rix, former president of the Arkansas National Bank, died in 1937, and County Judge Elza Housley appointed McLaughlin as the administrator of his estate worth over $300,000 (equivalent to $6,719,000 in 2025). Rix's half-brother, mother, and wife filed suit to have McLaughlin removed as the administrator, but he was retained. Tom Stone was selected to replace McLaughlin as the administrator.

== Electoral history ==
1916 Hot Springs, Arkansas City Attorney election
Party	Candidate	Votes	%
Independent	James McConnell	516	51.34%
Democratic	Leo McLaughlin (incumbent)	489	48.66%
Total votes		1,005	100.00%

1920 Hot Springs, Arkansas City Attorney election
Party	Candidate	Votes	%
Independent	Leo McLaughlin (incumbent)	776	65.99%
Independent	Sidney Taylor	301	25.60%
Independent	Orlando H. Sumpter	99	8.42%
Total votes		1,176	100.00%

== Works cited ==
- Allbritton, Orval (2003). Leo and Verne: The Spa's Heyday. Garland County Historical Society. ISBN 0929604873.
- Raines, Robert (2013). Hot Springs: From Capone to Costello. Arcadia Publishing. ISBN 9781439642115.
- Ramsey, Patsy (2000). "A Place at the Table: Hot Springs and the GI Revolt". The Arkansas Historical Quarterly. 59 (4). Arkansas Historical Association: 407–428. doi:10.2307/40023192. JSTOR 40023192.
- Nutt, Niven (1987). The Nutt Family. Boston Public Library.
