= 50th Armored Division =

Inactive US Army National Guard formation

- 50th Armored Division shoulder sleeve insignia
- Active: 14 October 1946–1 September 1993
- Country: United States
- Branch: United States Army
- Type: Armored warfare
- Size: Division
- Part of: New Jersey Army National Guard
- Nickname: "Jersey Blues"

Commanders
- Notable commanders: Donald W. McGowan

Insignia
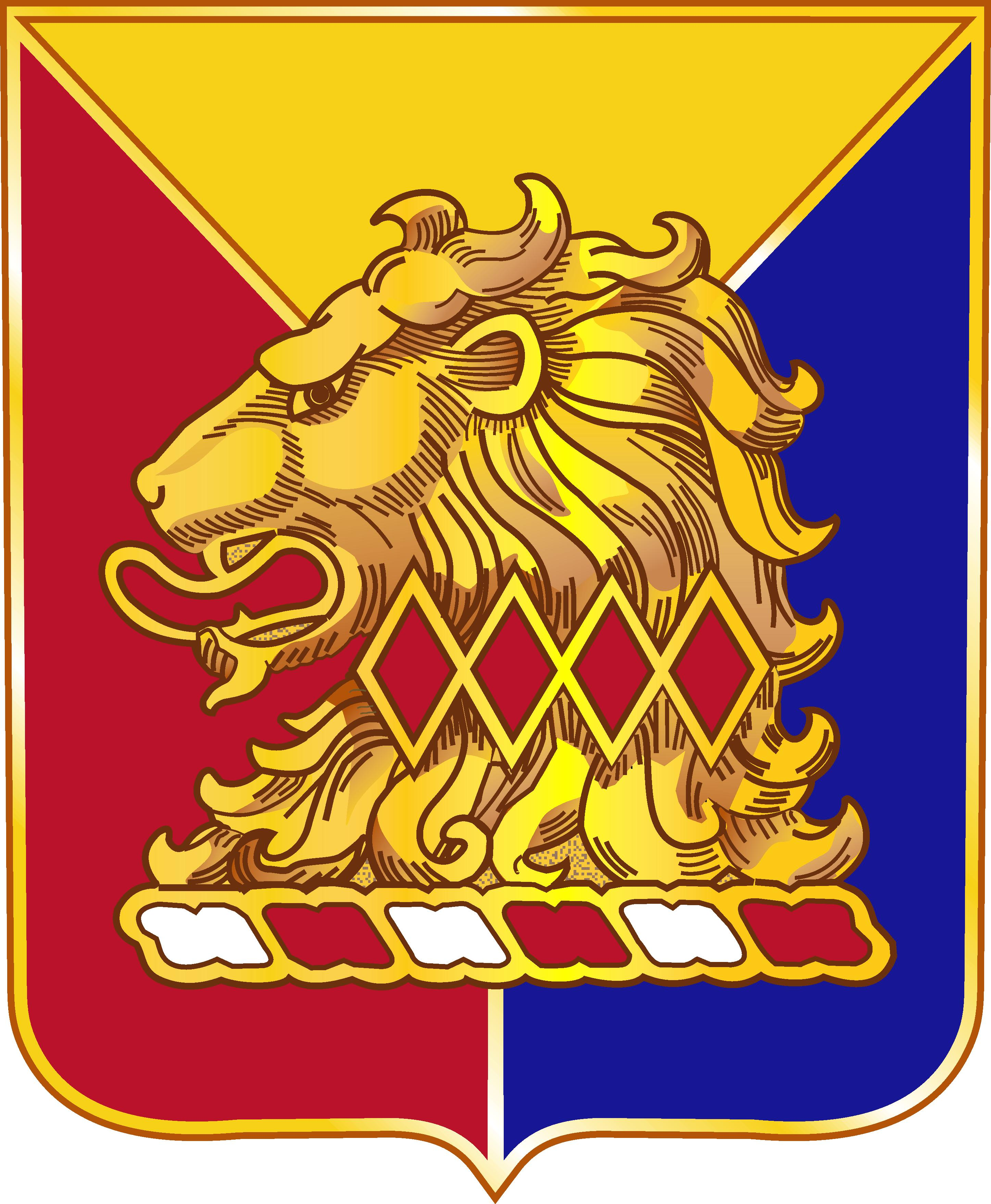
- Distinctive unit insignia

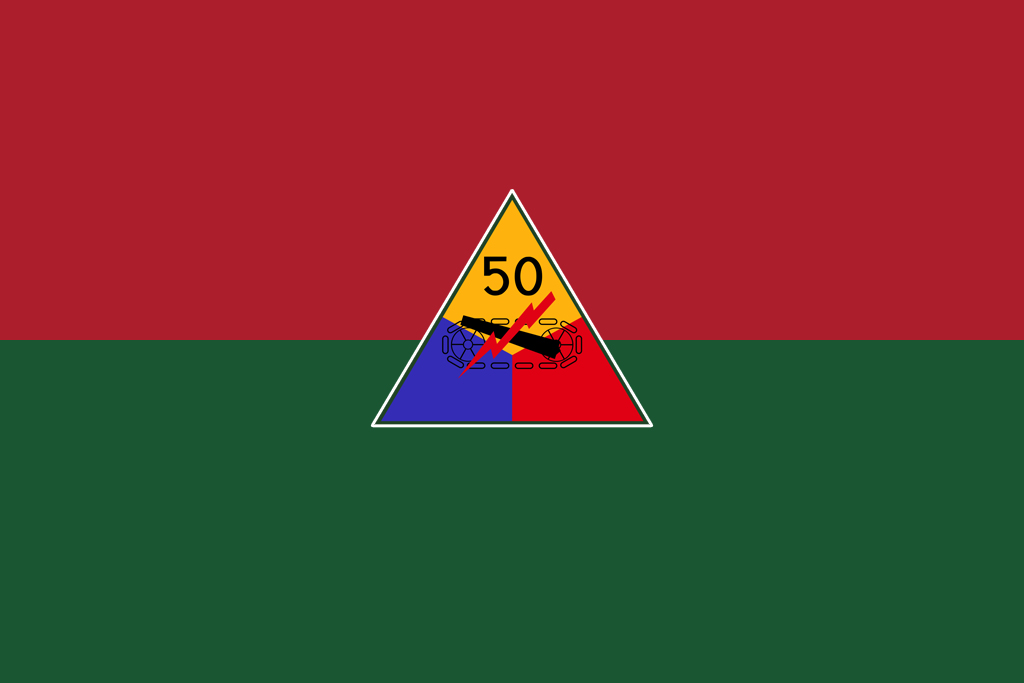
- Flag of the United States Army 50th Armored Division
NATO Map Symbol
50

The 50th Armored Division was a division of the Army National Guard from July 1946 until 1993.

== History ==
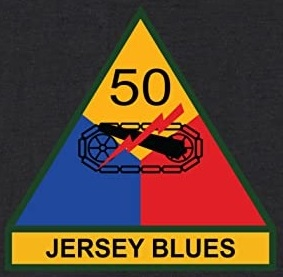
50th Armored Division with Jersey Blues Tab, used from the 1940s to the 1960s

On 13 October 1945 the War Department published a postwar policy statement for the entire Army, calling for a 27-division Army National Guard structure with 25 infantry divisions and two armored divisions. Once the process of negotiation was complete, among the new formations formed were the 49th and 50th Armored Divisions, the first armored divisions in the Army National Guard. The 50th Armored Division replaced the 44th Infantry Division within the New Jersey Army National Guard, with the 50th Armored assuming the 44th Infantry's "Jersey Blues" nickname. Most 50th Armored Division units were legacy units of the 44th Infantry and inherited the lineage and history of those units.

From 1963 to 1993 the Division Support Command was located in Newark, NJ, and then later in East Orange, NJ.

In a 1968 reorganization, the 50th Armored was joined by the 27th Armored Brigade from New York, the legacy unit left after the inactivation of the 27th Armored Division. Since the 50th Armored Division was no longer completely within New Jersey, it ceased using the "Jersey Blues" nickname. In 1968, the 50th Armored Division was reorganized to draw its units from New Jersey and the Vermont Army National Guard. Armor battalions in New Jersey and Vermont were upgraded to M48A1 and M48A3 Patton medium tanks.

During 1975 and 1976 Vermont and New Jersey armored battalions started turning in their M48A3 tanks and began receiving the M48A5 which had the same 105mm gun and fire control system as the M60A1 in use by the active Army. During this time, many Vermont tank crews competed in gunnery exercises held in West Germany and consistently brought back awards. The division's training was rigorous during the Soviet threat peak years of the late 1970s to mid 1980s. Germany was the primary area of operations for the division if it was to have been activated.

The bi-state organization comprised:

- Headquarters, 50th Armored Division (Somerset, New Jersey)
  - 104th Engineer Battalion HQ & HQ, Co.A, Co.B, Co.C, Co.E (bridge) Teaneck, New Jersey. Co.D, Vermont
  - 5th Squadron, 117th Cavalry
  - 150th Aviation Battalion (UH-1 & AH-1 Hueys) (later 1st Battalion, 150th Aviation)
- 1st Brigade (Woodbridge, New Jersey)
- 2nd Brigade (Cherry Hill, New Jersey)
- 86th Brigade (Montpelier, Vermont)
- Division Artillery (Trenton, New Jersey)
- Division Support Command (East Orange, NJ)

The Center of Military History notes that reorganizing the Army National Guard to meet the new "Division 86" structures in the mid-1980s was a challenging process, and most Guard divisions expanded their recruiting areas. The 50th Armored Division did not, and instead had the allotment for one of its brigades moved to the Texas Army National Guard, making the future of the division within the force structure 'uncertain'. In June 1988, Vermont's 86th Brigade left the 50th Armored Division and became part of the 26th Infantry Division.

=== Inactivation ===
In 1988 the 36th Brigade, 50th Armoured Division was formed within the Texas National Guard. It was reorganized and redesignated 1 September 1992 as Headquarters and Headquarters Company, 36th Brigade, 49th Armored Division.

On 1 September 1993, the 50th Armored Division was inactivated and its remaining brigades joined other divisions. The 36th Brigade had already been transferred a year before. New Jersey's 50th Infantry Brigade, which carried forward the Division's lineage, was made part of the 42nd Infantry Division.

=== Structure in 1988 ===
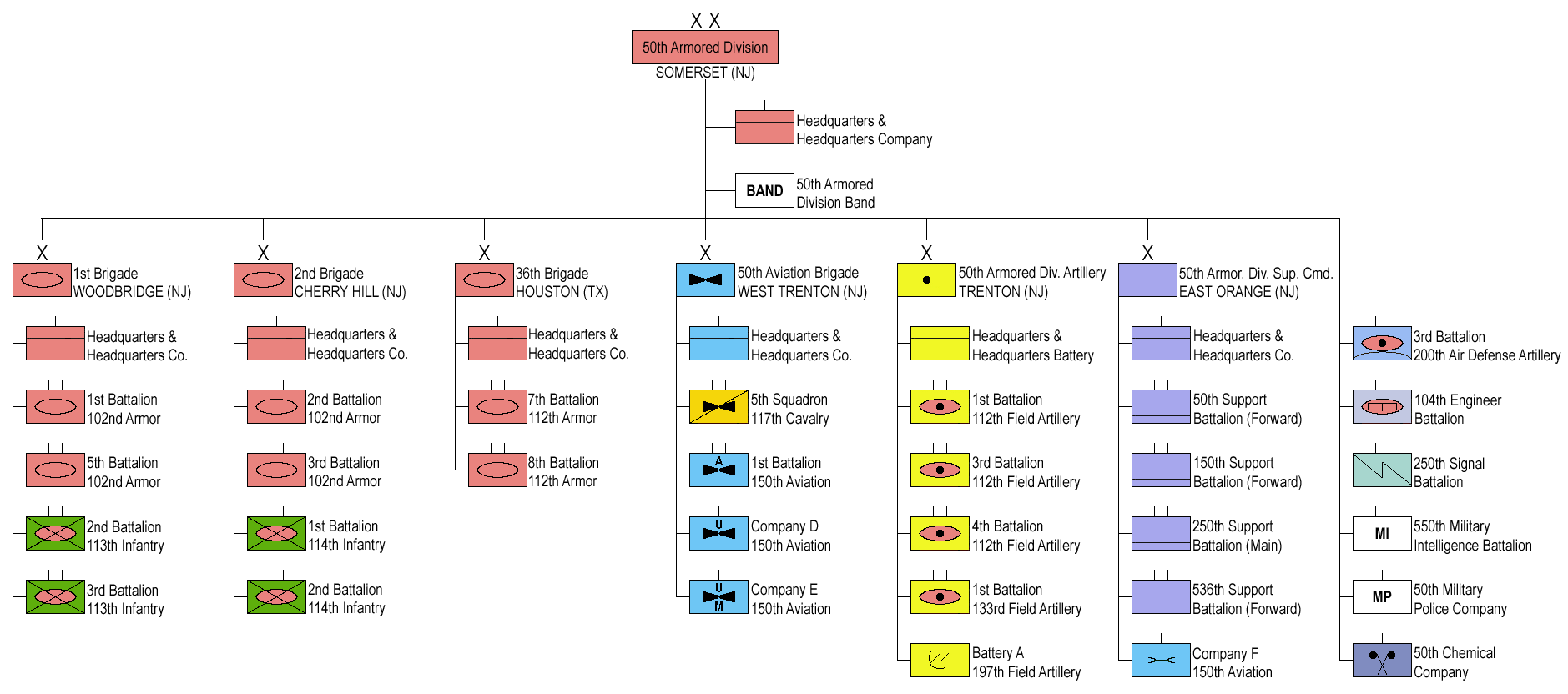
50th Armored Division 1989 (click to enlarge)

50th Armored Division key locations 1989 (without DISCOM):
Division/brigade headquarters Infantry Armor
Aviation Artillery Engineers Other units

At the end of the Cold War the division was a unit of the New Jersey Army National Guard, with a round-out brigade from the Texas Army National Guard. The division was organized according to the Army of Excellence table of organization and equipment:

Much of this data is drawn from the Annual Report of the NJ ARNG for 1988.

- 50th Armored Division, Somerset, New Jersey
  - Headquarters & Headquarters Company
  - 1st Brigade, Woodbridge
    - Headquarters & Headquarters Company
    - 1st Battalion, 102nd Armor, Phillipsburg
    - 5th Battalion, 102nd Armor Dover
    - 2nd Battalion, 113th Infantry, Newark
    - 3rd Battalion, 113th Infantry, Riverdale
  - 2nd Brigade, Cherry Hill
    - Headquarters & Headquarters Company
    - 2nd Battalion, 102nd Armor, West Orange
    - 3rd Battalion, 102nd Armor Vineland
    - 1st Battalion, 114th Infantry, Woodbury
    - 2nd Battalion, 114th Infantry Long Branch
  - 36th Brigade, Houston, Texas (Texas Army National Guard)
    - Headquarters & Headquarters Company
    - 7th Battalion, 112th Armor, Bryan, Texas
    - 8th Battalion, 112th Armor, Dallas, Texas
  - Aviation Brigade, 50th Armored Division, West Trenton
    - Headquarters & Headquarters Company
    - 5th Squadron, 117th Cavalry (Reconnaissance), Westfield Army Airfield
    - 1st Battalion, 150th Aviation (Attack), West Trenton
    - Company D, 150th Aviation (Command Support), Burlington Army Airfield (Vermont Army National Guard)
    - Company E, 150th Aviation (Assault), New Castle Army Airfield (Delaware Army National Guard)
  - 50th Armored Division Artillery, Trenton
    - Headquarters & Headquarters Battery
    - 1st Battalion, 112th Field Artillery, Cherry Hill (18 × M109A3 155 mm self-propelled howitzers)
    - 3rd Battalion, 112th Field Artillery, Morristown (18 × M109A3 155mm self-propelled howitzers)
    - 4th Battalion, 112th Field Artillery, Lawrenceville (12 × M110A2 203 mm self-propelled howitzers)
    - 1st Battalion, 133rd Field Artillery, Beaumont (Texas Army National Guard) (18 × M109A3 155 mm self-propelled howitzers)
    - Battery A, 197th Field Artillery (Target Acquisition), (New Hampshire Army National Guard)
  - 50th Armored Division Support Command, East Orange
    - Headquarters & Headquarters Company
    - 50th Support Battalion (Forward), Teaneck
    - 150th Support Battalion (Forward), Jersey City
    - 250th Support Battalion (Main), Sea Girt
    - 536th Support Battalion (Forward), (Texas Army National Guard)
    - Company F, 150th Aviation (Aviation Intermediate Maintenance), Dover
  - 3rd Battalion, 200th Air Defense Artillery (New Mexico Army National Guard) (MIM-72 Chaparral, M163 Vulcan & FIM-92 Stinger)
  - 104th Engineer Battalion, Teaneck
  - 250th Signal Battalion, Plainfield
  - 550th Military Intelligence Battalion, Pedricktown
  - 50th Military Police Company, Somerset
  - 50th Chemical Company, Sea Girt
  - 50th Armored Division Band, Jersey City

The brigade's armor battalions were equipped with M60A3 TTS main battle tanks. M48A5 Patton tanks had been replaced by M60A3 TTS tanks by May 1987 and by the end of 1989 the National Guard fielded 3,072 M60A3 TTS. The 410 M1 Abrams tanks of the National Guard were issued to round-out units of army divisions. The division's infantry battalions were equipped with M113 armored personnel carriers, of which the National Guard had 6,870 at the end of Fiscal Year 1987, with a further 1,411 due to be taken in service in 1988. The standard helicopters of National Guard units were the AH-1S Cobra, of which the National Guard had approximately 350 by 1989, the OH-58C Kiowa and the UH-1H Iroquois helicopters. Cavalry Reconnaissance units fielded 19 × M60A3 TTS, 8 × AH-1S Cobra, 12 × OH-58C Kiowa and 1 × UH-1H Iroquois helicopters; attack battalions fielded 21 × AH-1S Cobra, 13 × OH-58C Kiowa and 3 × UH-1H Iroquois helicopters, while the assault aviation company fielded 15 × UH-1H Iroquois helicopters and the command support aviation company UH-1 helicopters in various configurations.

== Commanders of the 50th Armored Division ==
- Major General Clifford R. Powell, July 1946 - November 1948
- Major General Donald W. McGowan, November 1948 - October 1955
- Major General Edward O. Wolf, October 1955 - December 1965
- Major General James H. Weyhenmeyer Jr., December 1965 - March 1977
- Major General Herman S. Tenkin, April 1977 - October 1979
- Major General George J. Betor, October 1979 - September 1981
- Major General Melvin J. Crain, September 1981 - March 1986
- Major General Mark B. Mullin, March 1986 - April 1990
- Major General Richard S. Schneider, April 1990 - October 1991
- Major General Robert J. Byrne, October 1991 - September 1993
