= William A. R. Robertson =

William A. R. Roberton
- Military career
- Allegiance: United States
- Branch: United States Army; United States Air Force
- Rank: Colonel
- Commands: Air Division
- Conflicts: World War II
- Awards: Legion of Merit

Colonel William A. R. Robertson was a senior officer in the United States Army and United States Air Force who served as the first Chief of the Air Division, National Guard Bureau from 1945 to 1948.

Military offices
| New command | Director of the Air National Guard; 1945–1948 | Succeeded by George G. Finch |
