= Edgar C. Erickson =

United States Army general (1898–1989)

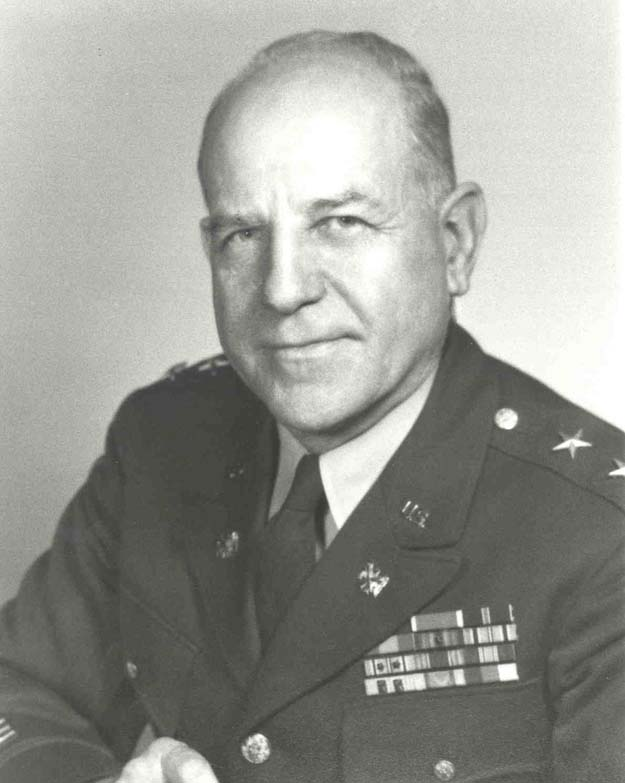
- Major General Edgar C. Erickson as NGB Chief
- Born: July 18, 1896; Worcester, Massachusetts, U.S.
- Died: March 31, 1989 (aged 92); Rutland, Massachusetts, U.S.
- Burial place: Worcester County Memorial Park, Paxton, Massachusetts
- Military career
- Allegiance: United States of America
- Branch: United States Army
- Service years: 1914–1959
- Rank: Major General
- Service number: 0-171317
- Units: Massachusetts Army National Guard; National Guard Bureau
- Commands: 181st Infantry Regiment; Massachusetts Army National Guard; Chief of the National Guard Bureau
- Conflicts: Pancho Villa Expedition; World War I World War II
- Awards: Distinguished Service Medal (U.S. Army); Legion of Merit; Bronze Star Medal
- Other work: Businessman; State legislator State reform school superintendent

Edgar C. Erickson (July 18, 1896 – March 31, 1989) was a United States Army major general who served as chief of the National Guard Bureau.

== Early life ==
Edgar Carl Erickson was born in Worcester, Massachusetts, on July 18, 1896, and was educated in the schools of Worcester.

== Pancho Villa Expedition ==
In April 1914, Erickson enlisted in Company H, 2nd Massachusetts Infantry. In 1916 he served with his unit on the Mexican border during the Pancho Villa Expedition.

== World War I ==
Erickson was a sergeant when he received his commission as a second lieutenant in 1917. He served with 2nd Battalion, 104th Infantry Regiment, 26th Infantry Division in France during World War I.

== Post World War I ==
After the war Erickson became a partner in Erickson Steel, a company formed to produce prefabricated buildings. He later worked as general manager of Worcester's Hedlund Coal Company.

In 1932 he graduated from the United States Army Command and General Staff College.

A Republican, he served in the Massachusetts State Senate from 1933 to 1936, representing Massachusetts Senate's 2nd Worcester district. He subsequently served as superintendent of the Worcester County Training School.

Having maintained his membership in the National Guard, by 1939 Erickson had risen to colonel and commander of the 181st Infantry Regiment.

== World War II ==
Erickson served as the Adjutant General of Massachusetts from 1939 to 1942 with the rank of brigadier general.

In 1940 he was also called to federal service as the Director of Selective Service for Massachusetts.

In 1942 Erickson accepted a reduction to colonel in order to serve in uniform overseas. He was assigned as liaison officer to the Chinese Nationalist Army for the remainder of the war.

== Post World War II ==
After the war Erickson was assigned to the National Guard Bureau. His assignments included: chief of the Infantry Regulations Branch; Chief of Plans; acting chief of the Army Division; and acting deputy chief of the National Guard Bureau.

In 1953 Erickson was appointed chief of the National Guard Bureau, and he served until his 1959 retirement.

As NGB chief, Erickson oversaw an increase in authorized personnel strength and a corresponding recruiting effort to fill the positions, as well as the fielding of the first jet fighters for units of the Air National Guard and the fielding of modern tanks for the Army National Guard's armor units.

== Awards and decorations ==
Erickson's awards included the Distinguished Service Medal (U.S. Army), Legion of Merit, and Bronze Star Medal.

== Retirement and death ==
In retirement Erickson resided in Worcester and Sun City, Arizona. He died in Rutland, Massachusetts' Holden Nursing Home on March 31, 1989, and was buried at Worcester County Memorial Park in Paxton.

== Legacy ==
The Erickson Trophy is awarded annually to the distinguished graduates of each of the state National Guard Officer Candidate Schools. The actual trophy and an inscribed list of recipients is maintained on display at National Guard Bureau, with replicas presented to each winner.

== Family ==
In 1920 he married Nancy I. Sundstrom (1898–1982). They had one son, Russell, who died in 1987.

== See also ==
- 1933–1934 Massachusetts legislature
- 1935–1936 Massachusetts legislature

Military offices
Preceded by Charles H. Cole	Adjutant General of Massachusetts; 1939–1942	Succeeded by BG John H. Sherburne
Preceded by MG Earl T. Ricks	Chief of the National Guard Bureau; 1953–1959	Succeeded by MG Winston P. Wilson
