= 42nd Regional Support Group =

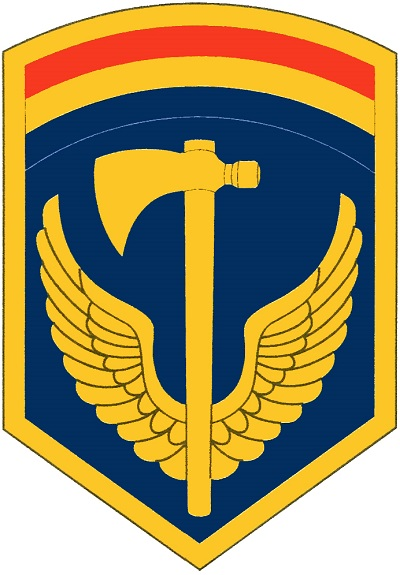
- Active: 22 February 1917 (as Supply Co. 1st Infantry) - present
- Country: United States
- Branch: United States Army National Guard
- Type: Logistics
- Part of: New Jersey Army National Guard
- Garrison/HQ: New Brunswick
- Motto: With Support We Conquer
- Engagements: World War I Muese-Argonne; Alsace 1918 World War II; Normandy; Northern France; Rhineland; Ardennes-Alsace; Central Europe War on Terrorism
- Decorations: Army Meritorious Unit Commendation; Campaign Streamer embroidered IRAQ 2004-2005
- Website: https://www.nj.gov/military/guard/army/major-commands/42rsg/

Commanders
- Current commander: LTC David S. Hampton
- Command Sergeant Major: CSM John A. Bowker

Insignia
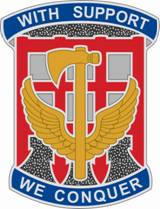
- Identification symbol

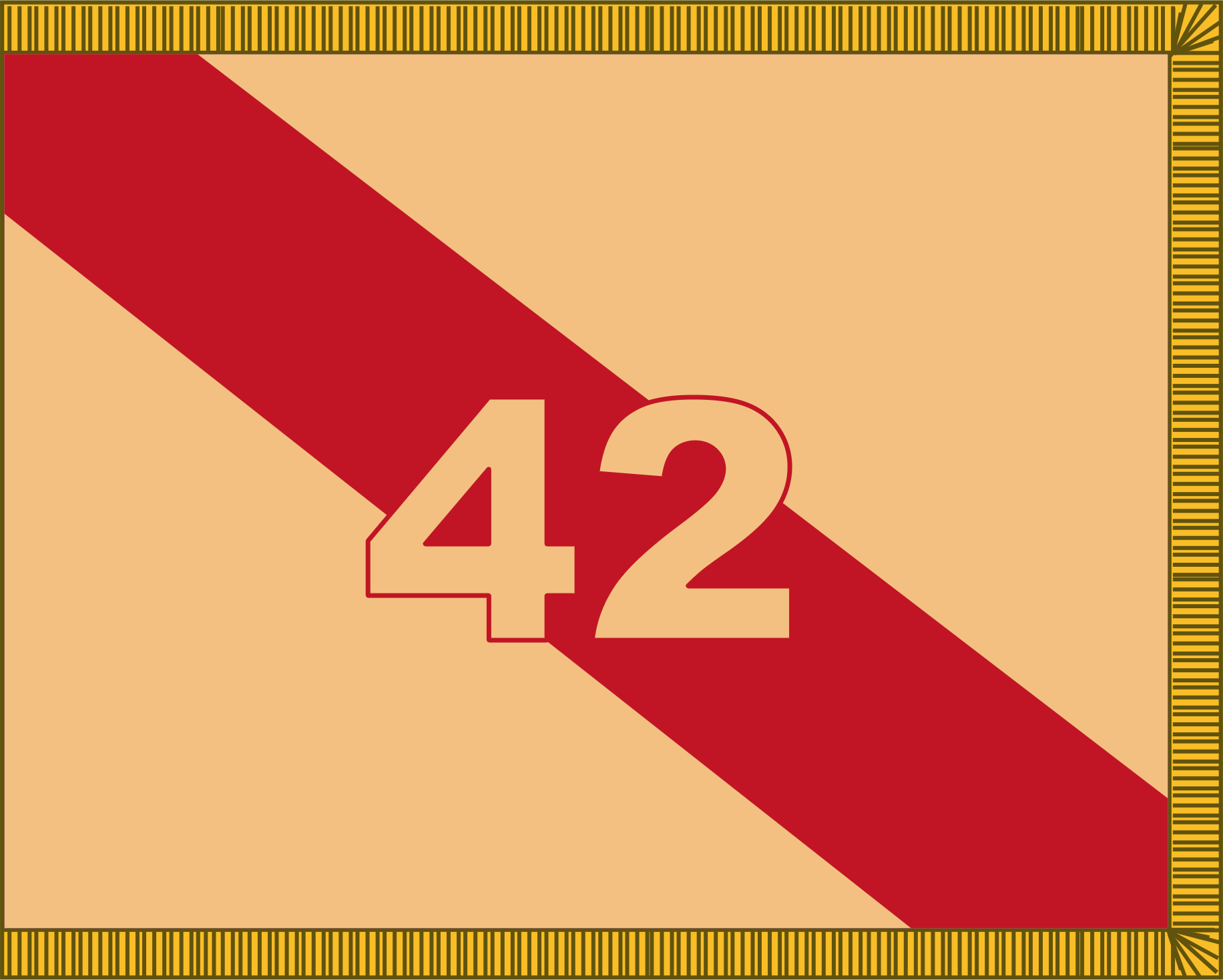
- 42nd Regional Support Group Flag

42nd Regional Support Group is a Regional Support Group of the New Jersey Army National Guard whose mission is to provide sustainment and emergency management to their support units and in support of local authorities in an emergency. In various capacities, the predecessor units of the 42nd RSG participated in World War I and World War II. They also deployed to fight in the War in Afghanistan (2001-2021) and the Iraq War (2004-05).

== Unit History ==
The 42nd Regional Support Group traces its history to 22 February 1917, with the creation of the 1st Infantry Supply Company at Newark, NJ in the NJARNG. It entered the Federal Service for World War I in August and by October was the Supply Co. 113th Infantry in the 29th Division. It saw service in the Meuse-Argonne and Alsace. The unit was deactivated at Camp Dix, NJ, in May 1919.

It was reactivated in June 1919 in the NJARNG as the Supply Co., 6th Infantry, and reassigned to the 113th Infantry in 1921.

As the Service Company, 113th Infantry, as part of the 44th Infantry Division, it participated in five World War II campaigns. It was finally inactivated in September 1945 at Camp Rucker, AL.

From 1946 to 1,993 the unit had several roles in the 50th Armored Division in Newark, NJ. It served as the Division Support Command from 1963 to 1993.

In 1988 the 50th Armored Division Support Command comprised:

- Headquarters & Headquarters Company (East Orange)
- 50th Support Battalion (Forward), Teaneck
- 150th Support Battalion (Forward), Jersey City
- 250th Support Battalion (Main), Sea Girt, New Jersey
- 536th Support Battalion (Forward) (Texas Army National Guard)
- Company F, 150th Aviation (Aviation Intermediate Maintenance), Dover

On 1 September 1993, it became the HHC of 42nd Infantry Division Support Command, which became the 42nd Support Group in 2006. In 2018 the name changed to the 42nd Regional Support Group.

== Units in 2019 ==
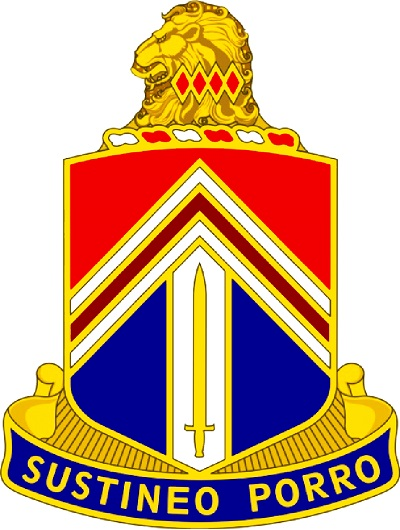
- 117th Combat Sustainment Support Battalion at Woodbridge
      - 143d Transportation Company
      - 508th Military Police Company at Teaneck
      - 50th Chemical Company at Somerset
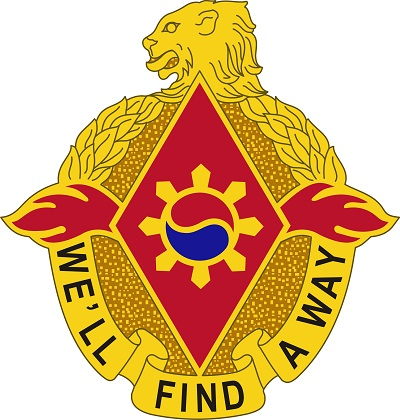
- 119th Combat Sustainment Support Battalion at Vineland
      - 253d Transportation Company at Cape May
      - Detachment 1 at Atlantic City
      - 328th Military Police Company at Cherry Hill
      - 154th Quartermaster Company (Water Purification) at New Egypt
      - 820th Quartermaster Detachment (Water Distribution) at New Egypt
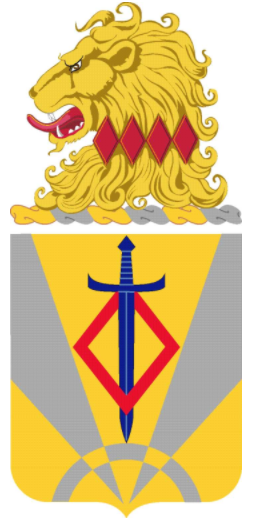
- 50th Finance Management Company at Somerset (New Brunswick)
      - 250th Finance Detachment at Somerset (New Brunswick)
      - 350th Finance Detachment at Somerset (New Brunswick)

== Insignia ==
Shoulder Sleeve Insignia is a dark blue pointed shield with a rounded top. The top has three arc of gold red and gold. The center has a golden tomahawk with gold wings. The shoulder sleeve insignia was approved on 11 June 2007.

Distinctive Unit Insignia is a silver metal device with a red portcullis in the background. On the front is a golden tomahawk with gold wings. Above and below are blue scrolls with the motto "With Support We Conquer." The distinctive unit insignia was approved on 11 June 2007.
