= Herluf Nygaard =

Norwegian military officer (1916–2001)

- Born: 1 October 1916; Lurøy Municipality, Norway
- Died: 3 December 2001 (aged 85)
- Education: Norwegian Military Academy
- Occupation: Military officer
- Awards: St. Olav's Medal With Two Oak Branches; King's Commendation for Brave Conduct; Order of St. Olav (1971)

Herluf Nygaard (1 October 1916 – 3 December 2001) was a Norwegian military officer. He was born in Lurøy Municipality. He graduated from the Norwegian Military Academy in 1946. He was promoted to Colonel in 1965, and Major General in 1968. He served as General Inspector for the Home Guard from 1967. He was decorated Commander of the Order of St. Olav in 1971.

Nygaard was an active resistance fighter during the Second World War. His war decorations include the Norwegian St. Olav's Medal With Two Oak Branches and the British King's Commendation for Brave Conduct.

In 1974, Nygaard partnered with U.S. Maj. Gen. Francis S. Greenlief to establish the Minnesota–Norway National Guard Partnership.
