= Fordyce House (Little Rock, Arkansas) =

Historic house in Arkansas, United States

- U.S. National Register of Historic Places
- U.S. Historic district – Contributing property
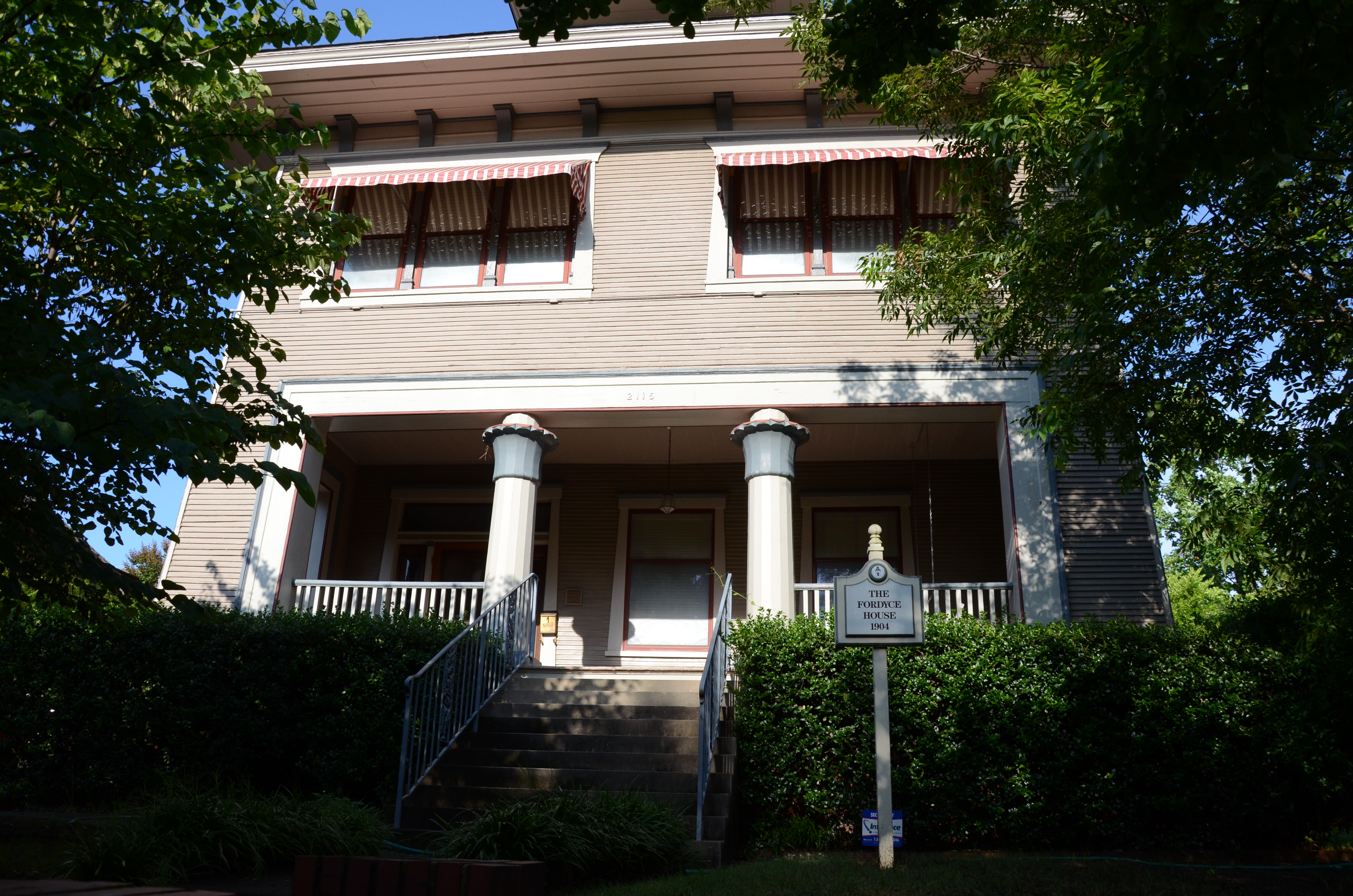

- Location within Arkansas Location within the United States
- Location: 2115 S. Broadway, Little Rock, Arkansas
- Coordinates: 34°43′40″N 92°16′41″W
- Built: 1904
- Architect: Charles L. Thompson
- Architectural style: Exotic Revival, Egyptian Revival
- Part of: Governor's Mansion Historic District (1988 enlargement) (ID88000631)
- NRHP reference No.: 75000407

Significant dates
- Added to NRHP: August 06, 1975
- Designated CP: May 19, 1988

The Fordyce House is a historic house at 2115 South Broadway in Little Rock, Arkansas. Built in 1904 to a design by noted Arkansas architect Charles L. Thompson, it is believed to be the state's only example of Egyptian Revival residential design. It is two stories in height, with narrow clapboard trim. A recessed porch shelters the main entrance, with the stairs leading up to flanked at the top by two heavy Egyptian columns. The second floor windows are banded in groups of three and the roof has a deep cornice with curved brackets. John Fordyce, for whom it was built, was a prominent businessman and engineer who held numerous patents related to cotton-processing machinery.

The house was added to the National Register of Historic Places in 1975.

== See also ==
- National Register of Historic Places listings in Little Rock, Arkansas
