= George G. Finch =

United States Air Force general

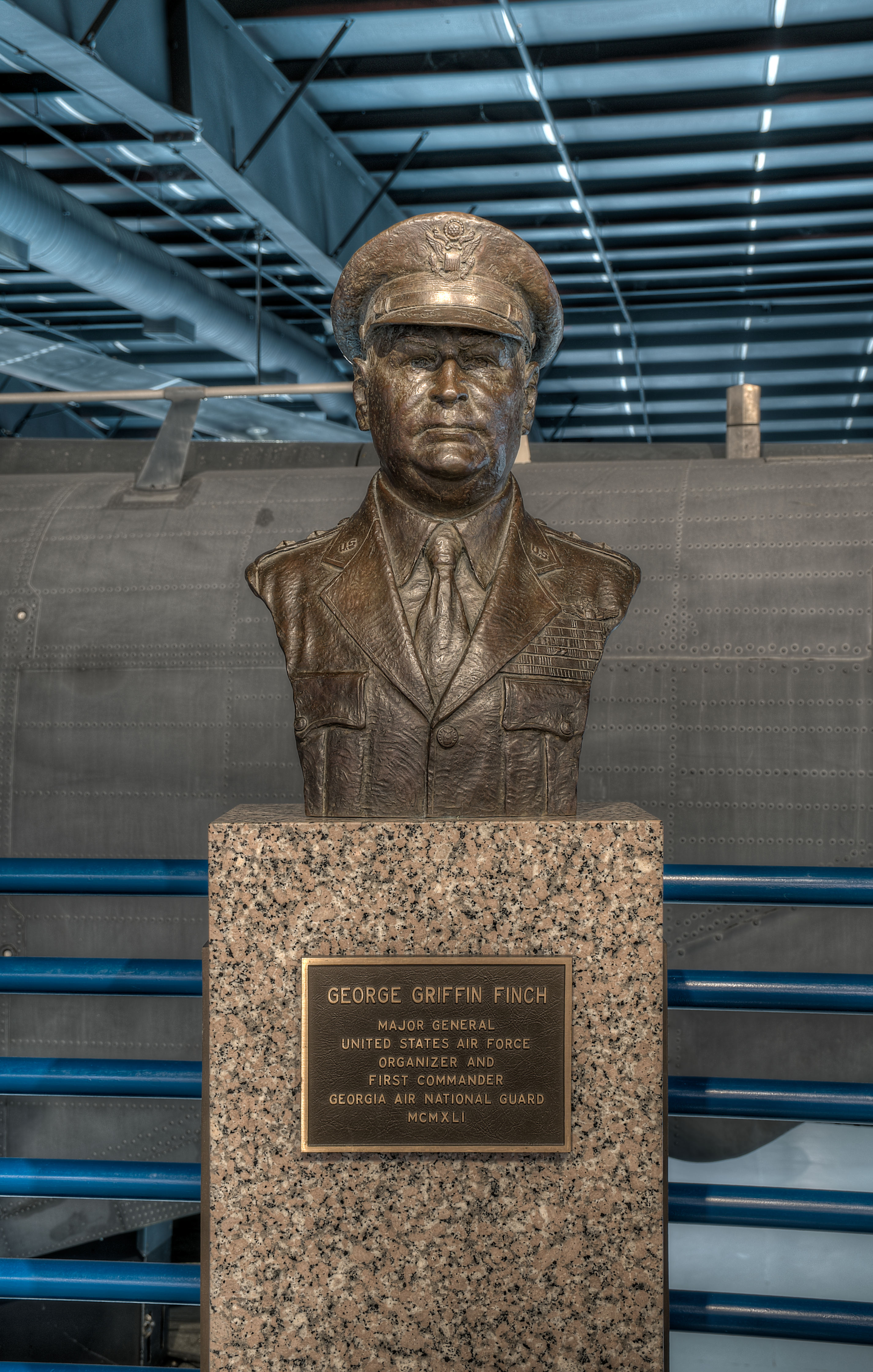
- Bust of Major General Finch at the Museum of Aviation, Robins AFB
- Born: April 11, 1902; Dade City, Florida, U.S.
- Died: January 3, 1986 (aged 83); Atlanta, Georgia, U.S.
- Burial place: Marietta National Cemetery
- Military career
- Allegiance: United States
- Branch: United States Army; United States Air Force
- Service years: 1918–1957
- Rank: Major General
- Commands: Fourteenth Air Force; Air Division; Georgia Air National Guard; 27th Pursuit Squadron
- Conflicts: World War I World War II; Korean War
- Awards: Legion of Merit

Major General George Griffin Finch (April 11, 1902 – January 3, 1986) was a senior officer in the United States Air National Guard who served as Chief of the Air Division, National Guard Bureau from 1948 to 1950. In 1953 he replaced General Mark W. Clark on the UN command delegation to the Korean armistice talks.

== Military career ==
George Griffin Finch was born on April 11, 1902, in Dade City, Florida. He began his military career during World War I, enlisting in the Aviation Section of the United States Army's Signal Corps in 1918. He remained in the Reserve Corps after the war and, in 1926, became Commander, 27th Pursuit Squadron, 1st Pursuit Group. In 1940, Georgia Governor Ed Rivers commissioned Finch to form the first flying unit of the Georgia Air National Guard. The unit was mobilized into the United States Army in September 1941, with Major Finch as commander.

After World War II, Finch was a leading critic of efforts to eliminate the air arm of the National Guard during peacetime. He became the first Chief of the Air Force Division of the National Guard Bureau in 1948. Under his leadership, the Air National Guard built to combat readiness and was among the first components called into service after the outbreak of the Korean War. As a result of Finch's vision and perseverance, 45,000 officers and airmen of 22 wings and 65 squadrons gave the Air Force the strength it needed in the early phase of the Korean War. Finch served as the senior Air Force member of the United Nations negotiating team at the peace talks at Panmunjom, Korea, and received the Legion of Merit for outstanding service in 1955. Finch assumed command of Fourteenth Air Force at Robins AFB, Georgia, becoming the nation's first Air National Guardsman to head a numbered air force. Finch had a career of "firsts", including the United States Army's first night landing with a single, five-million-candlepower floodlight in 1927. He also established and endowed the General John P. McConnell Award at the United States Air Force Academy.

== Retirement and legacy ==
Considered by many as the father of the Air National Guard, Finch retired in 1957. A graduate of the University of Georgia and a member of the Georgia Bar, Finch was enshrined in the Georgia Aviation Hall of Fame May 18, 1996.

Military offices
Preceded by William A. R. Robertson	Director of the Air National Guard; 1948–1950	Succeeded by Earl T. Ricks
