= Fordyce House (Hot Springs, Arkansas) =

Historic house in Arkansas, United States

- U.S. National Register of Historic Places
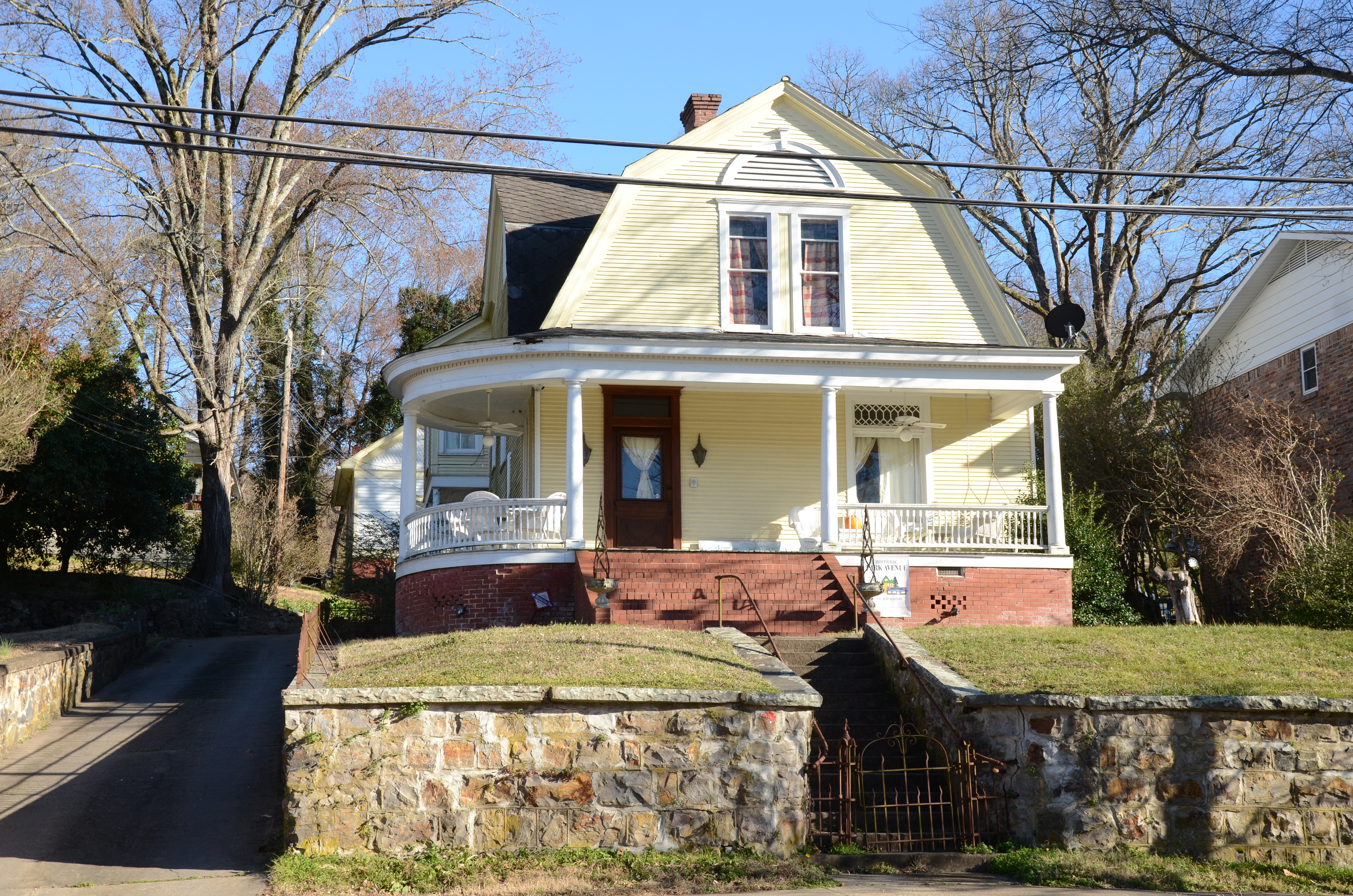

- Location within Arkansas Location within the United States
- Location: 746 Park Ave., Hot Springs, Arkansas
- Coordinates: 34°31′45″N 93°2′58″W
- Area: less than one acre
- Built: 1910
- Architect: Thompson, Charles L.
- Architectural style: Colonial Revival
- MPS: Thompson, Charles L., Design Collection TR
- NRHP reference No.: 82000818
- Added to NRHP: December 22, 1982

The Fordyce House is a historic house at 746 Park Avenue in Hot Springs, Arkansas. It is a 1 1/2-story wood-frame structure, with a hip roof that has large cross-gabled gambrel dormers projecting in each direction. It has a curved wraparound porch supported by Tuscan columns. It was built in 1910 to a design by architect Charles L. Thompson, and is an excellent local example of Colonial Revival architecture.

The house was listed on the National Register of Historic Places in 1982.

== See also ==
- National Register of Historic Places listings in Garland County, Arkansas
