= Donald W. McGowan =

United States Army general

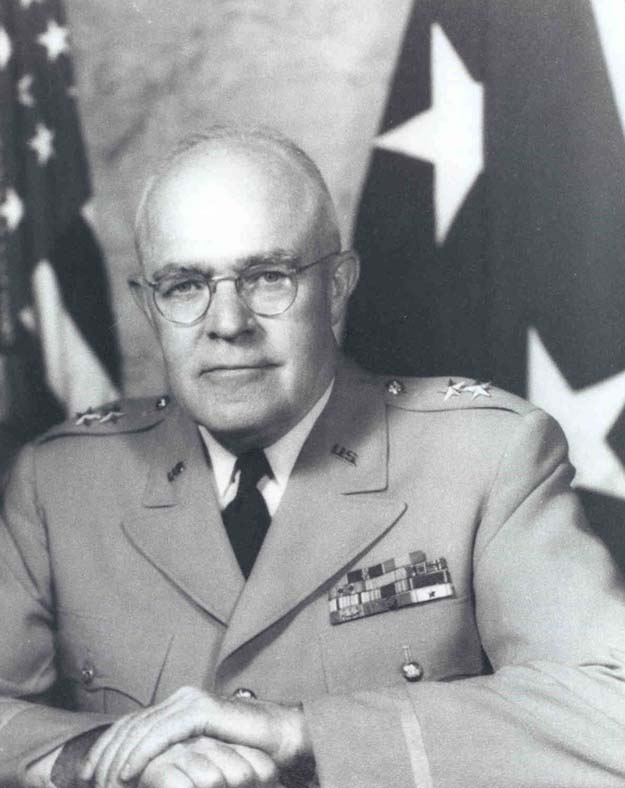
- Major General McGowan as National Guard Bureau Chief
- Born: August 30, 1899; Orange, New Jersey, US
- Died: September 24, 1967 (aged 68); Lawrence Township, Mercer County, New Jersey, US
- Burial place: Arlington National Cemetery
- Military career
- Allegiance: United States
- Branch: United States Army
- Service years: 1916–1963
- Rank: Major General
- Units: New Jersey National Guard; National Guard Bureau
- Commands: 102nd Cavalry Regiment; 50th Armored Division; Army National Guard; National Guard Bureau
- Conflicts: Pancho Villa Expedition; World War I World War II
- Awards: Distinguished Service Medal (U.S. Army); Bronze Star Medal
- Other work: President, United States Armor Association

Donald Wilson McGowan (August 30, 1899 – September 24, 1967) was a United States Army Major General who served as commander of the 50th Armored Division and Chief of the National Guard Bureau.

== Early life ==
McGowan was born on August 30, 1899, in Orange, New Jersey. He graduated from high school in Orange in 1916, and enlisted in the New Jersey National Guard's Company I, 5th Infantry Regiment. He served with his regiment in Texas during the Pancho Villa Expedition.

== World War I ==
McGowan was promoted to sergeant major of the 114th Infantry Regiment, 29th Infantry Division in 1918. He served in Europe, and took part in the Meuse-Argonne and Alsace campaigns. In late 1918 the Army asked commanders to recommend students from the ranks for attendance at the United States Military Academy, and McGowan's brigade commander, John McAuley Palmer, recommended him. McGowan attended West Point from 1919 to 1922, but resigned without graduating and returned to the New Jersey National Guard.

== Post World War I ==
In 1922 McGowan received a commission as a second lieutenant. He held a variety of command and staff positions as he advanced through the ranks, primarily with the 44th Infantry Division. In 1935 he graduated from the United States Army Command and General Staff College. He was a lieutenant colonel when he served as New Jersey's Assistant Adjutant General from 1936 to 1941.

== World War II ==
In 1941 he was appointed to command of the 102nd Cavalry Regiment. He served in Europe, and participated in the D-Day assault on Omaha Beach.

Later in 1944 he was assigned as Provost Marshal for the Normandy Base Section, and his responsibilities expanded to include Brittany, the Lower Seine, Belgium and the Netherlands. After the war McGowan returned to his position as New Jersey's Assistant Adjutant General. He was subsequently appointed Deputy Chief of Staff of the New Jersey Department of Defense.

== Post World War II ==
In 1947 McGowan was promoted to brigadier general. From 1948 to 1955 he was commander of the 50th Armored Division as a major general.

From 1955 to 1959 McGowan was Chief of the Army Division at the National Guard Bureau. In 1959 he was named Chief of the National Guard Bureau, and he served until 1963.

During his tenure the National Guard successfully mobilized more than 65,000 members during the Berlin Crisis of 1961. In addition, the number of state Officer Candidate Schools increased from 5 to 51. The National Guard also converted its anti-aircraft weapons to Nike-Ajax and Hercules missiles and organized its first Special Forces units.

At his retirement McGowan was the last known Villa Expedition veteran to still be serving in the U.S. military.

== Awards and decorations ==
McGowan's awards and decorations included the Distinguished Service Medal (U.S. Army), and the Bronze Star Medal (2).

== Retirement and death ==
After retiring from the military, McGowan served as president of the United States Armor Association. He died at his home in Lawrence Township, Mercer County, New Jersey, on September 24, 1967, from the effects of self-inflicted gunshot wounds. He was buried in Arlington National Cemetery, Section 3, Site 2067-E.

== Family ==
McGowan was married to Helen Margaret S. Schoeffel. They had four sons and one daughter, and all the sons all served in the military. Their daughter Margaret graduated from the University of Vermont and was a teacher in Vergennes and a writing instructor at the University of New Hampshire.

Donald McGowan (died December 15, 1966) was a career member of the New Jersey Army National Guard.

Colonel Robert Silber "Bob" McGowan (died February 4, 2001) graduated from West Point in 1952 and served as an aide to General Maxwell D. Taylor. He served 3 tours in Vietnam, including one as commander of 3d Squadron, 4th Cavalry, 25th Infantry Division. He was the most decorated member of his West Point class, and his awards included: Distinguished Service Cross; Silver Star (4); Legion of Merit; Distinguished Flying Cross (2); Bronze Star Medal with V for Valor (5), and Purple Heart (3).

John "Jay" McGowan flew helicopters as a casualty evacuation pilot during the Vietnam War. After his military service he flew for the Port Authority of New York and New Jersey, serving as chief pilot of the authority's police helicopter operation until retiring shortly after the September 11, 2001 terrorist attacks.

After his military service Duncan McGowan became an architect in Concord, New Hampshire. He and his artist wife Mary raised two daughters, one who became an architect and one who became professor of South Asian studies at the University of Vermont.

Military offices
Preceded by MG Winston P. Wilson (Acting)	Chief of the National Guard Bureau; 1959 – 1963	Succeeded by MG Winston P. Wilson
