= Winston P. Wilson =

United States Air Force general (1911–1996)

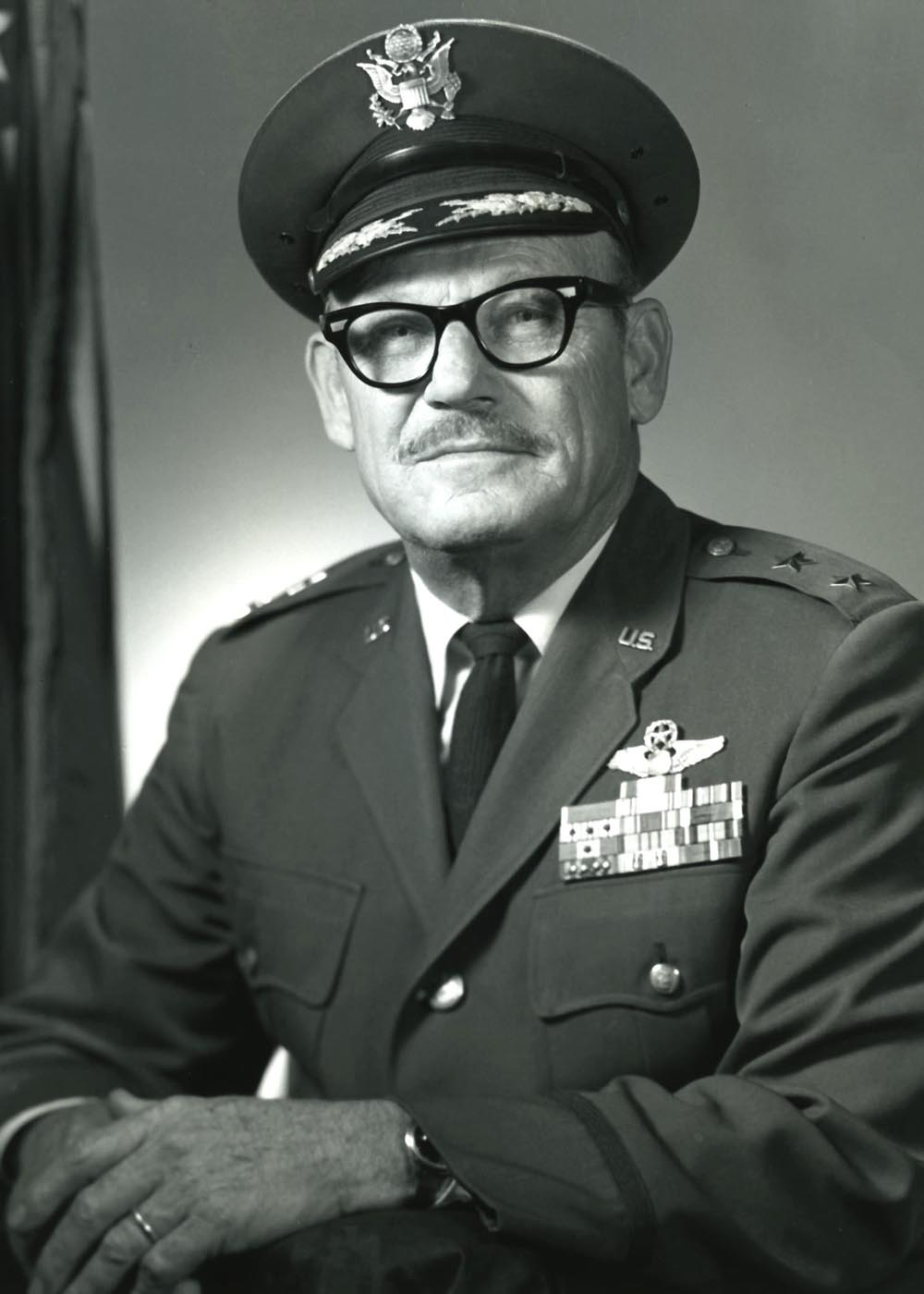
- Major General Winston P. Wilson
- Born: November 11, 1911; Arkadelphia, Arkansas, U.S.
- Died: December 31, 1996 (aged 85)
- Military career
- Allegiance: United States
- Branch: United States Air Force
- Service years: 1929–1971
- Rank: Major General
- Nickname: Wimpy
- Unit: Arkansas National Guard
- Commands: Chief of the National Guard Bureau; Air National Guard; 154th Fighter Squadron; 16th Photographic Squadron
- Conflicts: World War II; Vietnam War
- Awards: Air Force Distinguished Service Medal; Legion of Merit

Winston Peabody Wilson (November 11, 1911 – December 31, 1996) was a United States Air Force major general who served as Chief of the National Guard Bureau.

== Early life ==
Winston Peabody Wilson was born in Arkadelphia, Arkansas, on November 11, 1911. Wilson was raised and educated in Little Rock, Arkansas, and acquired the nickname "Wimpy", a play on words using his name, when his football coach at Little Rock High School hollered for "Win P. Wilson" to take the field. He enlisted in the Arkansas National Guard in 1929 and was an aircraft mechanic in the 154th Observation Squadron.

Wilson graduated from Hendrix College in 1934. In 1936 he became qualified as a pilot after receiving instruction from Earl T. Ricks, and he received his commission as a second lieutenant in 1940, the same year he received his commercial pilot's license.

== World War II ==
During World War II, Wilson initially served with the 154th Squadron at Eglin Field, flying anti-submarine patrols. In September 1942, he was assigned to the staff at Headquarters, United States Army Air Forces, in Washington, D.C. He was rated as a service pilot in May 1943, and appointed Chief of the Tactical Reconnaissance Branch in July, 1943, receiving promotion to major.

In 1944, Wilson became commander of the 16th Photographic Squadron, responsible for photographic mapping and charting missions in South America, Alaska and the continental United States. In 1945, he was assigned to the Pacific as liaison officer to the Far East Air Forces, and he was subsequently assigned as assistant air photo officer at Headquarters, Far East Air Forces, in the Philippines, receiving promotion to lieutenant colonel.

== Post-World War II ==
In 1946, Wilson was appointed chief of the reconnaissance unit in the Operations and Training staff section (A-3), of Pacific Air Command, operating in both Tokyo and Manila.

Wilson, now the commander of the Arkansas National Guard's reorganized 154th Fighter Squadron, played a role in the creation of the new United States Air Force, and was an advocate for two separate Reserve components, the United States Air Force Reserve and the Air National Guard. Among the changes he instituted in an effort to improve readiness were a modified drill schedule, moving from four Wednesday nights per month to two Wednesday nights and two full Sundays, the precursor to the current one full weekend per month schedule.

== National Guard Bureau ==
In 1950, Earl T. Ricks was appointed director of the Air National Guard and selected Wilson as his deputy. Wilson, now a colonel, was responsible for the training, readiness, equipping and deployment of Air National Guard units during the Korean War. He served in this role until Ricks' death, and was the acting director during Ricks' final illness.

Before Ricks died, he recommended Wilson as his replacement. Wilson was appointed director of the Air National Guard in 1954, and promoted to brigadier general. In 1955, he was appointed deputy chief of the National Guard Bureau and promoted to major general. He carried out this assignment while also serving as director of the Air National Guard.

From June to July 1959, Wilson served as acting chief of the National Guard Bureau after the retirement of Edgar C. Erickson and before the appointment of Donald W. McGowan.

During his tenure as Air Guard Director, Wilson oversaw the organization's diversification from a fighter-based force to one of fighters, bombers, observation, and transport units, as well as a modernization of its planes and facilities.

== Chief of the National Guard Bureau ==
In 1963, Wilson was appointed Chief of the National Guard Bureau, the first Air Force officer to be officially named to the position (Ricks had served as acting Chief for four months.) Long an advocate for integrating National Guard and Reserve units into operations with active duty ones, rather than using them as a strategic reserve, Wilson's view was validated during the Vietnam War, with Air Guard fighter squadrons serving successfully in Vietnam, especially following the Pueblo Incident and the Tet Offensive, when called on to deploy with little or no advance notice.

Wilson also continued efforts to racially integrate the National Guard, including the appointment of its first African-American general officer.

In addition to its military preparations, Wilson also oversaw enhanced training and equipping efforts so that the National Guard could respond to civil disturbances, which happened with increasing frequency as the result of the civil rights and anti-Vietnam War movements of the 1960s.

As Chief during the Vietnam War, Wilson also made news when he advocated that Guard members take part in counter-demonstrations in response to opponents of the war, asking them to drive with their car headlights on during the day, fly the U.S. flag more frequently, and leave their porch lights on at night.

Wilson flew in Vietnam on observing and fact finding missions, and received the Vietnam Service Medal. He was appointed to a second term in 1967 and served until his 1971 retirement.

== Retirement and death ==
In retirement, Wilson resided in Forrest City, Arkansas. He suffered a stroke and died at Baptist East Hospital in Memphis, Tennessee on December 31, 1996. He was buried at South Town Cemetery in Forrest City.

== Legacy ==
The National Guard Marksmanship Training Center at Camp Joseph T. Robinson, Arkansas hosts the annual Winston P. Wilson Rifle and Pistol Championship, a nationwide contest where teams and individuals from participating states compete for high scores in small arms target shooting.

In 2000 Wilson was inducted into the Airlift/Tanker Association Hall of Fame.

The Arnold Air Society's state contact at the University of Arkansas is the Winston P. Wilson Squadron.

== Major awards and decorations ==
- Air Force Distinguished Service Medal
- Legion of Merit
- American Defense Service Medal
- Asiatic-Pacific Campaign Medal
- World War II Victory Medal (United States)
- Army of Occupation Medal (Japan)
- National Defense Service Medal
- Vietnam Service Medal
- Armed Forces Expeditionary Medal
- Air Force Longevity Service Award
- Armed Forces Reserve Medal
- Philippine Liberation Ribbon
- Oklahoma Distinguished Service Medal
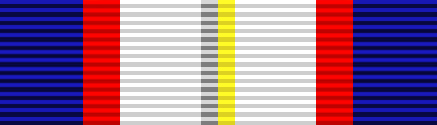
- North Carolina Distinguished Service Medal
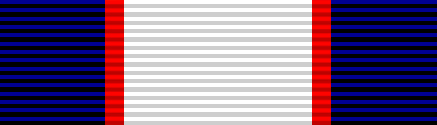
- Pennsylvania Distinguished Service Medal

Military offices
| Preceded by Major General Earl T. Ricks | Director of the Air National Guard; 1954–1962 | Succeeded by Major General I. G. Brown |
| Preceded by Major General Edgar C. Erickson | Chief of the National Guard Bureau; Acting; 1959 | Succeeded by Major General Donald W. McGowan |
| Preceded by Major General Donald W. McGowan | Chief of the National Guard Bureau; 1963–1971 | Succeeded by Major General Francis Greenlief |
