= Fordyce–Ricks House Historic District =

Historic district in Arkansas, United States

- U.S. National Register of Historic Places
- U.S. Historic district
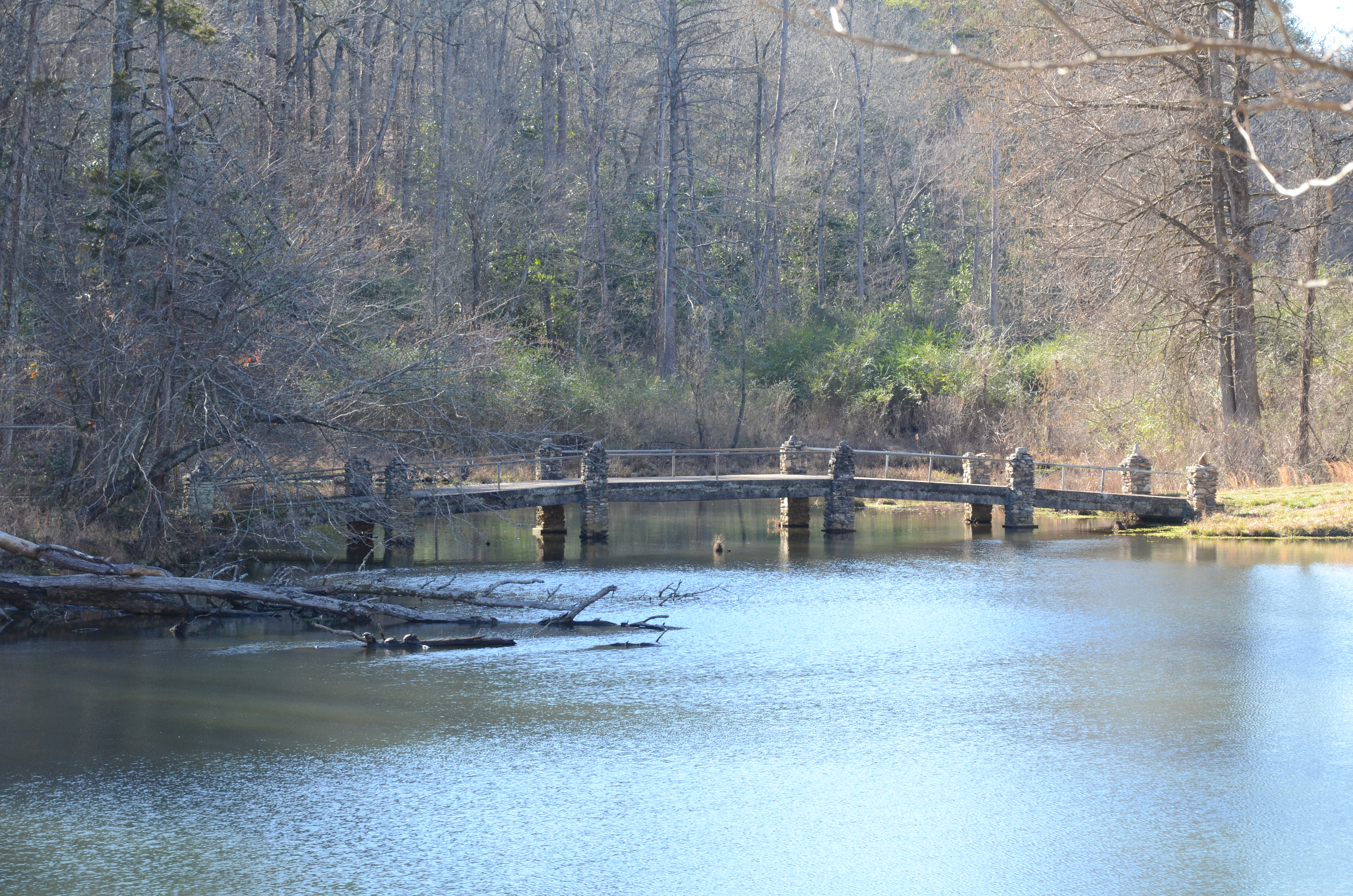

- Location within Arkansas Location within the United States
- Location: 1501 Park Ave., Hot Springs, Arkansas
- Coordinates: 34°32′1″N 93°2′1″W
- Area: 37 acres (15 ha)
- Built: 1904
- Architect: John Lawrence Mauran
- Landscape architect: John Rison Fordyce; Samuel W. Fordyce
- Architectural style: Rustic
- NRHP reference No.: 03001098
- Added to NRHP: October 31, 2003

The Fordyce–Ricks House Historic District encompasses a locally rare collection of Adirondack Architecture structures located at 1501 Park Avenue in Hot Springs, Arkansas. The district encompasses 37 acres (15 ha) of land that originally belonged to Samuel W. Fordyce, a prominent railroad executive who had a major role in promoting and developing Hot Springs as a resort community. The district includes a 1 1/2-story octagonal log house, three outbuildings, and a landscaped rustic environment. 20 acres (8.1 ha) of the former estate are now a part of Hot Springs National Park.

The district was listed on the National Register of Historic Places in 2003.

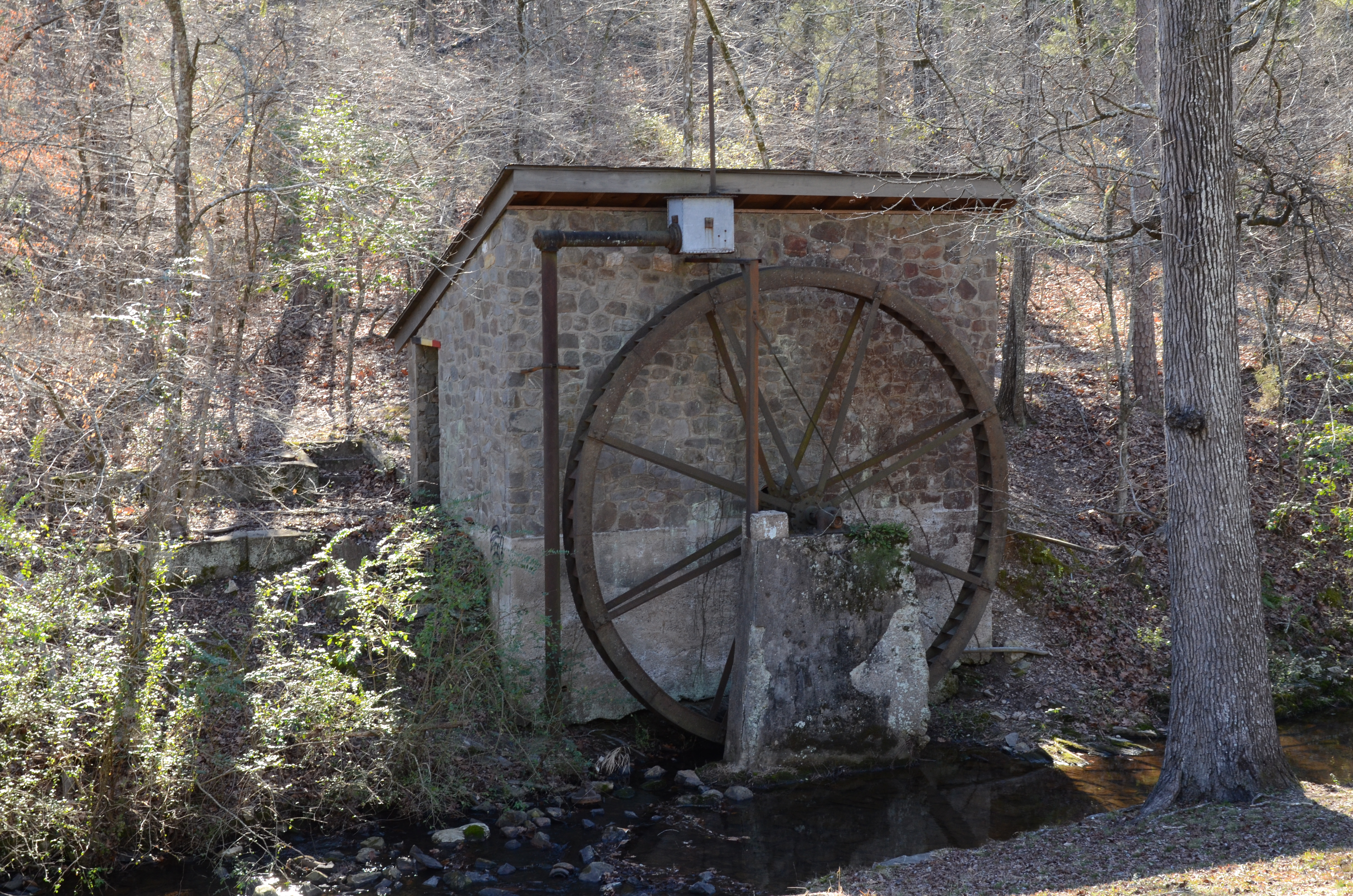
Water wheel

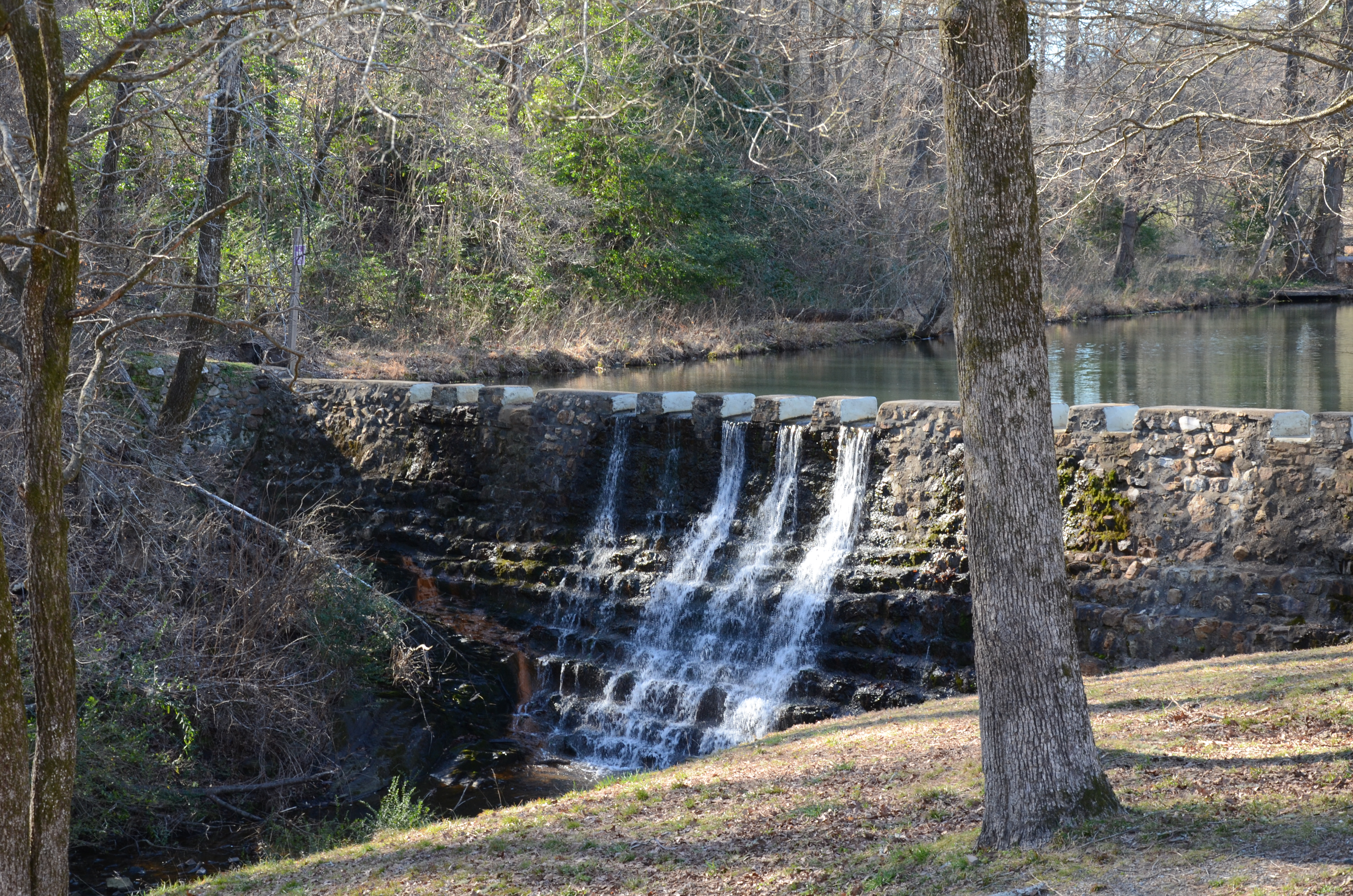
Water flowing over a dam

== See also ==
- National Register of Historic Places listings in Garland County, Arkansas
