= 123 Squadron =

123 Squadron may refer to:

- No. 123 Squadron RCAF, Canada
- 123 Squadron (Israel)
- 123 Squadron, Republic of Singapore Air Force, see list of Republic of Singapore Air Force squadrons
- No. 123 Squadron RAF, United Kingdom
- 123d Fighter Squadron, United States Air Force
- 123rd Special Tactics Squadron, United States Air Force
- VAH-123, United States Navy
- VAW-123, United States Navy
- VP-123, United States Navy
- VMF-123, United States Marine Corps
