= John B. Conaway =

US Air Force general

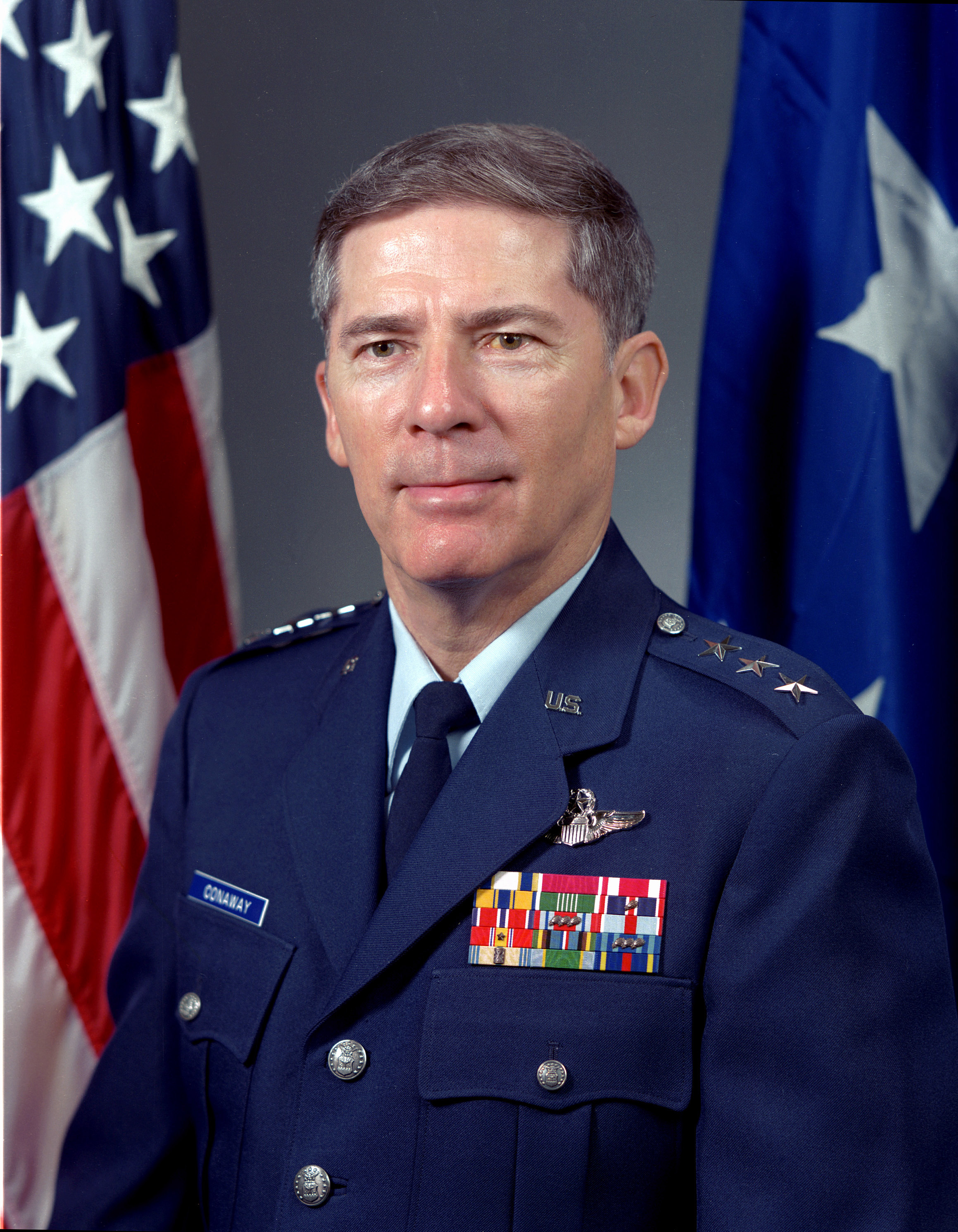
- Lieutenant General John B. Conaway
- Born: August 23, 1934 (age 92); Henderson, Kentucky, U.S.
- Military career
- Allegiance: United States
- Branch: United States Air Force
- Service years: 1956–1993
- Rank: Lieutenant general
- Commands: Chief of the National Guard Bureau; Air National Guard; Kentucky Air National Guard
- Awards: Defense Distinguished Service Medal; Air Force Distinguished Service Medal; Army Distinguished Service Medal; Legion of Merit
- Other work: Government relations consultant Author

Lieutenant General John B. Conaway (born August 23, 1934) is a retired United States Air Force officer who served as Chief of the National Guard Bureau from 1990 to 1993.

== Early life ==
John B. Conaway was born in Henderson, Kentucky, on August 23, 1934. He graduated from Bosse High School in Evansville, Indiana, in 1952, earned a Bachelor of Science degree in business administration from the University of Evansville in 1956, and joined the Lambda Chi Alpha fraternity.

== Military career ==
While attending the University of Evansville, Conaway entered the Reserve Officer Training Corps program and was commissioned as a second lieutenant in the United States Air Force in June 1956.

After completing basic pilot training at Greenville Air Force Base, Mississippi, in 1957, Conaway attended advanced combat crew training at Perrin Air Force Base, Texas, graduating in 1958. His next assignments were as an F-102 fighter-interceptor pilot in the Air Defense Command at K.I. Sawyer Air Force Base and Kincheloe Air Force Base, Michigan.

In 1960, Conaway joined the West Virginia Air National Guard as an SA-16 pilot, flying a special forces operations mission. In 1963, he transferred to the Kentucky Air National Guard's 123rd Tactical Reconnaissance Wing as an RB-57 pilot. In 1965 he became a training instructor flying RF-101s.

Conaway was called to active duty with the Kentucky Air National Guard in January 1968 and served in Alaska, Panama, Japan and South Korea. Upon deactivation in June 1969, he returned to the Kentucky Air National Guard as operations officer.

In 1972, Conaway was appointed Air Commander of the Kentucky Air National Guard. In December 1974, he was appointed vice commander of the 123rd Tactical Reconnaissance Wing, which had units in Kentucky, Arkansas, Nevada and Idaho. Other assignments included serving as the 123rd's director of operations, chief of safety, chief of standardization and evaluation, group commander, group deputy commander for operations, and squadron operations officer.

Conaway continued graduate work at the University of Louisville School of Business and the University of Kentucky School of Business. In 1975, he earned a master's degree in management and human relations from Webster University. He graduated from the Air Force Commander's Safety School in 1969, Air Command and Staff College in 1971, Air University Commander's School in 1972 and the Industrial College of the Armed Forces in 1973.

Conaway was appointed deputy director of the Air National Guard in April 1977. In April 1981 he was advanced to Director of the Air National Guard.

In July 1988 Conaway was appointed Vice Chief of the National Guard Bureau. He served until February 1990, when he was appointed as Chief of the National Guard Bureau and promoted to lieutenant general.

Conaway served as Chief of the National Guard Bureau until retiring on November 30, 1993.

== Retirement ==
Conaway operates a consulting company, The Conaway Group.

In 1989 he was elected to the University of Evansville Board of Trustees, and he became a Life Trustee in 2007.

He has also remained active in civic causes, including serving as chairman of the board for the National Guard Youth Foundation.

In 1997 Conaway authored Call Out the Guard: The Story of Lieutenant General John B. Conaway and the Modern Day National Guard.

== Awards and decorations ==
=== Military awards and decorations ===
Conaway's military awards and decorations include the:

- Defense Distinguished Service Medal
- Air Force Distinguished Service Medal
- Army Distinguished Service Medal
- Legion of Merit
- Meritorious Service Medal
- Air Force Commendation Medal
- Army Commendation Medal
- Air Force Outstanding Unit Award with oak leaf cluster
- Air Force Organizational Excellence Award
- Combat Readiness Medal with three oak leaf clusters
- Air Force Recognition Ribbon
- National Defense Service Medal with service star
- Armed Forces Expeditionary Medal
- Air Force Longevity Service Award Ribbon with four oak leaf clusters
- Armed Forces Reserve Medal with two hourglass devices
- Small Arms Expert Marksmanship Ribbon
- Air Force Training Ribbon
- Kentucky Distinguished Service Medal

=== Other awards ===
- Eugene M. Zuckert Management Award, U.S. Air Force
- Citation of Honor, U.S. Air Force Association
- Exceptional Service Award, Selective Service System
- Order of the Sword, Air National Guard
- Honorary Doctor of Laws degree, University of Evansville
- Montgomery Medal, National Guard Association of the United States, 2007
- Robert W. Crawford Achievement Prize, National Recreation Foundation

== Attribution ==
Military offices
Preceded by Herbert R. Temple Jr.	Chief of the National Guard Bureau; 1990–1993	Succeeded by Philip G. Killey (acting)
Preceded by John T. Guice	Director of the United States Air National Guard; 1981–1988	Succeeded by Philip G. Killey
