= I. G. Brown =

United States Air Force general

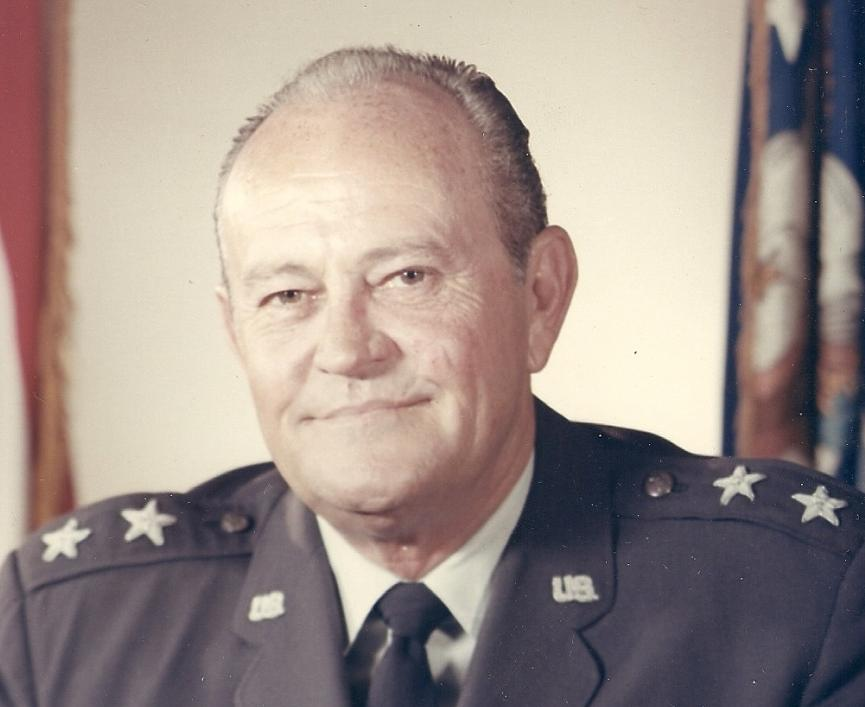
- Major General I. G. Brown
- Born: June 11, 1915; Hot Springs, Arkansas, U.S.
- Died: September 26, 1978 (aged 63); Annandale, Virginia, U.S.
- Military career
- Allegiance: United States
- Branch: United States Army Air Forces; United States Air Force
- Service years: 1942–1974
- Rank: Major general
- Commands: Air National Guard
- Conflicts: World War II

I. G. Brown (June 11, 1915 – September 26, 1978) was a senior officer in the United States Air Force who served as the First Director, Air National Guard from August 6, 1969 – April 19, 1974.

In 1946, then Lieutenant Colonel Brown, temporarily retired, was elected Sheriff of Garland County, Arkansas on the independent "GI" reform ticket. During his 4-year term, illegal gambling operations were closed down and a number of corrupt officials from the previous political "machine", including the former mayor of 25 years, Leo P. McLaughlin, were arrested and prosecuted. Brown did not seek re-election and returned to active duty in 1951 shortly after leaving office.

"The Training and Education Center was established in 1968 as the I.G. Brown Professional Military Education Center, named in honor of the first Director of the Air National Guard, Maj. Gen. I.G. Brown. In 1998, its name was changed to The I.G. Brown Air National Guard Training and Education Center."

== Command Excellence Trophy ==
Major general I.G. Brown command excellence trophy recipients:

=== 2011 ===
- Region 3: Colonel Wendy K. Johnson, Commander, 155th Mission Support Group, Nebraska Air National Guard
- Region 4: Colonel Roger E. Williams Jr., Commander, 145th Operations Group, North Carolina Air National Guard
- Region 6: Colonel Christopher R. Alderdice, Commander, 122nd Maintenance Group, Indiana Air National Guard

=== 2008 ===
- Lt Col William G. Siddoway – Region 1 Chapter 9 – 169th Intelligence Squadron, Salt Lake City, Utah
- Col James R. Summers – Region 2 Chapter 54 – 189th AW/CC, Little Rock, AR
- Lt Col Steven H. Plamann – Region 3 Chapter 76 – 155th OSF/CC, Lincoln, NE
- Brig Gen Iwan B. Clontz – Region 4 Chapter 7 – JFHQ-NC/AAGA, Raleigh, NC
- Lt Col Robert P. Lemieux – Region 5 Chapter 88 – ANGRC/CV, Andrews AFB, MD
- Capt James E. Robinson – Region 6 Chapter 75 – 183rd SFS CC, Springfield, IL

== Notes ==
Military offices
Preceded by Winston P. Wilson	Director of the United States Air National Guard; 1962-1974	Succeeded by John J. Pesch
