= 123rd Contingency Response Group =

123d Contingency Response Group
- Active: 15 April 2009 - present
- Country: United States
- Allegiance: Kentucky
- Branch: Air National Guard
- Role: "Respond in the event of a terrorist attack, natural disaster or other major emergency anywhere within a 400-mile radius of Louisville"
- Engagements: Operation Enduring Freedom; Operation Iraqi Freedom; Operation United Assistance; Operation Inherent Resolve; Operation Allies Refuge

Commanders
- Current commander: Col Aaron Zamora

The 123d Contingency Response Group (CRG) is a unit of the 123d Airlift Wing, Kentucky Air National Guard. Officially formed in 2009 it is the first of three Air National Guard CRG's along with the 108th CRG of the New Jersey Air National Guard and the 156th CRG of the Puerto Rico Air National Guard.

== Mission ==
The primary mission of the 123d CRG is to provide rapidly deployable forces to the United States Air Force to open forward airfields in an expeditionary environment as a completely self-contained unit. In addition, due to its unique mobile capability, the 123d CRG is also utilized to provide quick reaction logistical support for humanitarian missions including man-made and natural disasters.

The 123d has been described as an "air base in a box." The group acts as an early responder in the event of contingency operations worldwide. Its personnel are capable of deploying into remote airfields, providing command and control of aircraft, and establishing airfield operations so troops and cargo can flow into affected areas.

Unit members represent a broad spectrum of specialties, including air traffic control, airfield security, ramp and cargo operations, aircraft maintenance, and command and control.

In 2010, the group was one of two Air Force contingency response units to establish overseas airlift hubs supporting earthquake-recovery efforts in Haiti, directing the delivery of hundreds of tons of relief supplies into the Dominican Republic for subsequent trucking to Haiti.

== Organization ==
The 123d CRG is a subunit of the 123d Airlift Wing, Kentucky Air National Guard stationed at Louisville International Airport (Louisville Air National Guard Base). The CRG has two squadrons, the 123d Global Mobility Squadron (GMS) and the 123d Global Mobility Readiness Squadron (GMRS). The 123d GMS provides operational support for forward airfields including the Airfield Operations Flight, Mobile Aerial Port Flight, and Aircraft Maintenance Flight. The 123d GMRS provides logistical support for forward airfields including the Logistics Flight, Intelligence Flight, and Security Forces Flight (Phoenix Fist).

== Deployments ==
Members of the 123d CRG have deployed worldwide in support of many operations, including Operations Enduring Freedom and Iraqi Freedom. Notably, many CRG members deployed on 12 hours notice in 2009 as a part of the largest activation of the Kentucky National Guard history during an ice storm that affected a majority of Kentucky.

On 21 January 2010, 40 members of the 123d CRG deployed to the Dominican Republic in support of Operation Unified Response. This was the first organizational deployment for the 123d CRG. Deployed as the 123d Contingency Response Element, the CRG established an airfield in Barahona Dominican Republic and then relieved a response element from the 572nd CRG, an active duty unit from Travis Air Force Base, at San Isidro AB, near Santo Domingo, Dominican Republic.

The 123d CRG was one of the first air force assets in Operation United Assistance, the US Response to the Ebola epidemic in West Africa. Deployed on 4 October 2014 to open an airfield for military cargo operations and to establish an aerial port of debarkation at Léopold Sédar Senghor International Airport in Dakar, Senegal. Within 60 days they were to hand off to the 787th Air Expeditionary Squadron to follow-on forces. 77 members from the CRG deployed under the direction of the United States Agency for International Development designed to transfer shipments from KC-10 Extenders, C-17 Globemaster IIIs and civilian 747s into Lockheed C-130 Hercules aircraft for use across the region.

In 2017, the unit deployed in support of Operation Inherent Resolve to Qayyarah Airfield West (also called Q-West or Key West) during the Battle of Mosul. The unit provided air operations, command and control, and logistics support for US and coalition fixed wing and rotary wing assets.

On 21 August 2021 the unit deployed a CRE (Contingency Response Element to Volk Field, WI in support of OPERATION ALLIES REFUGE assisting with the mass evacuation of refugees from Afghanistan.
