= John J. Pesch =

United States Air Force general

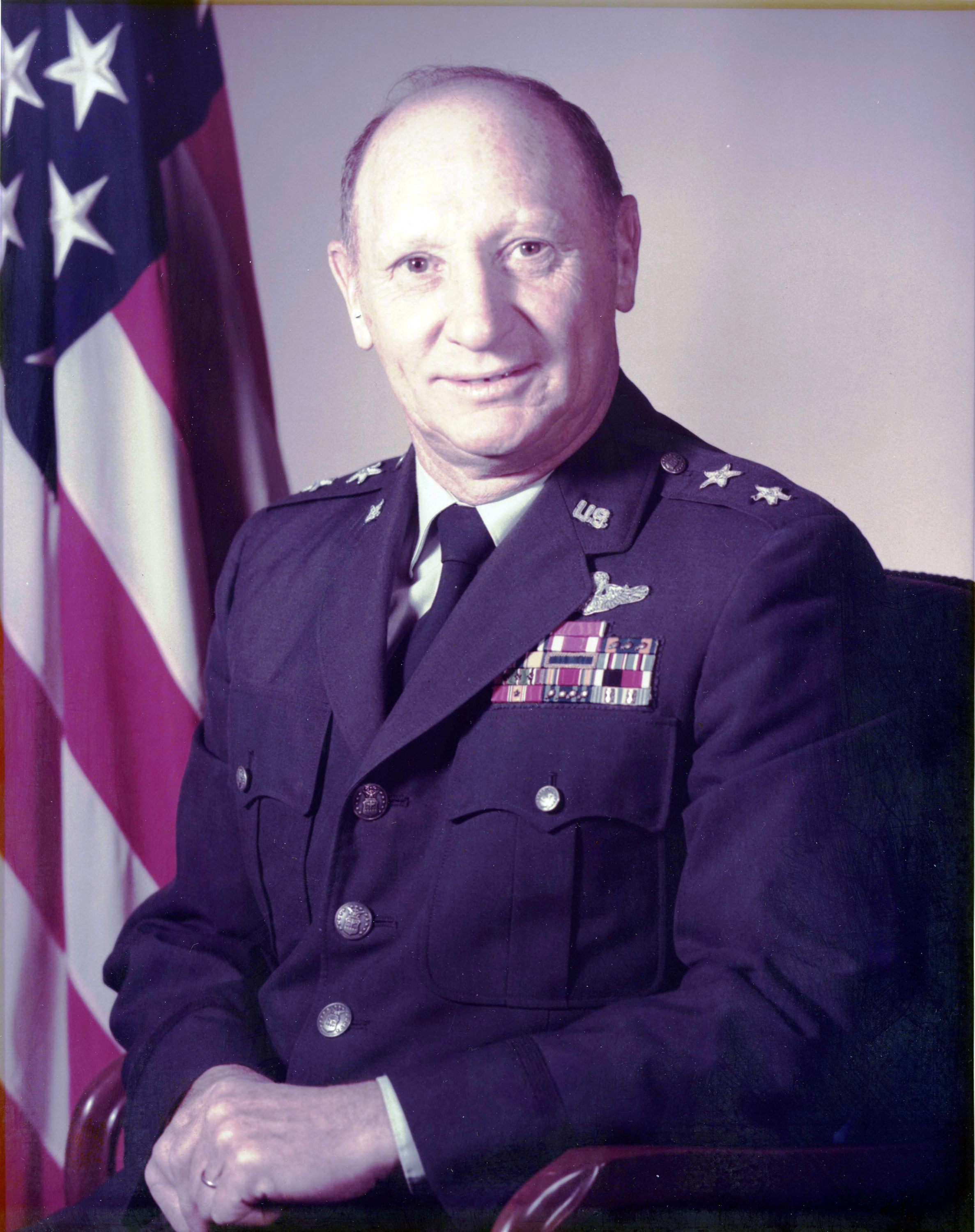
- Major General John J. Pesch
- Born: 20 July 1921; Maspeth, Queens, New York, U.S.
- Died: 10 January 2010 (aged 88); Sterling, Virginia, U.S.
- Military career
- Allegiance: United States
- Branch: United States Army Air Forces; United States Air Force
- Rank: Major General
- Commands: Air National Guard; 132nd Fighter-Interceptor Squadron
- Conflicts: World War II
- Awards: Air Force Distinguished Service Medal; Legion of Merit; Distinguished Flying Cross (2)

John Joseph Pesch (20 July 1921 – 10 January 2010) was a senior officer in the United States Air Force who served as director of the Air National Guard from 20 April 1974 to 31 January 1977. He served in World War II, and was a young pilot on 23 March 1944, when German fighters shot out two engines on the left side of his B-17 during a bombing raid. Eight members of the crew bailed out, leaving Pesch and his co-pilot, J. C. Amley, to successfully land the aircraft.

== Major General John J. Pesch Flight Safety Trophy ==
Pesch is remembered each time his "Flight Safety Trophy" is awarded to an organization.

- 157th Air Refueling Wing
- 135th Airlift Group
- 119th Wing (Awarded Trophy in 2003, 2002, and 2000)

== Major awards and decorations ==
- Air Force Distinguished Service Medal
- Legion of Merit
- Distinguished Flying Cross with one oak leaf cluster
- Meritorious Service Medal
- Air Medal with three oak leaf clusters.
- Air Force Commendation Medal
- Presidential Unit Citation
- World War II Victory Medal (United States)
- Army of Occupation Medal
- National Defense Service Medal

== Notes ==
Military offices
Preceded by I. G. Brown	Director of the United States Air National Guard; 1974–1977	Succeeded by John T. Guice
