= Paul A. Weaver =

United States Air Force general

Paul A. Weaver Jr.
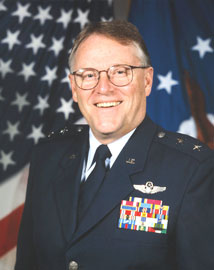
- Paul A. Weaver Jr.
- Military career
- Allegiance: United States
- Branch: United States Air Force
- Service years: 1967–2002
- Rank: Major General
- Commands: Air National Guard; 105th Airlift Group
- Conflicts: Gulf War
- Awards: Air Force Distinguished Service Medal; Legion of Merit

Major General Paul A. Weaver Jr. is a retired United States Air Force officer who served as the director of the Air National Guard from 28 January 1998 to 3 December 2001. His pilot career started in 1967 as an F-4E pilot in West Germany. He also served at Osan Air Base, South Korea, and the Republic of Korea Tiger Division, Camp Red Cloud, Korea. He served as the air commander for the New York Air National Guard, and was responsible for the largest conversion in the history of the Air National Guard, at 105th Airlift Group, Stewart Air National Guard Base, New York. Under his command, the 105th Airlift Group converted from the Air Force's smallest aircraft, the 0-2 Skymaster, to the largest aircraft, the Lockheed C-5 Galaxy. He also oversaw the largest military construction project in the history of the Reserve Forces, the construction of Stewart Air National Guard Base.

As a command pilot he has over 2,800 flying hours and served in Operation Just Cause, Operations Desert Shield and Desert Storm.

== Major awards and decorations ==
- Air Force Distinguished Service Medal
- Legion of Merit
- Meritorious Service Medal
- Aerial Achievement Medal
- Air Force Commendation Medal with two oak leaf clusters
- Presidential Unit Citation
- Air Force Outstanding Unit Award with two oak leaf clusters
- Air Force Organizational Excellence Award
- Combat Readiness Medal
- National Defense Service Medal with service star
- Armed Forces Expeditionary Medal
- Southwest Asia Service Medal with two oak leaf clusters
- Air Force Overseas Ribbon-Short
- Air Force Overseas Ribbon-Long with oak leaf cluster
- Air Force Longevity Service Award Ribbon with seven oak leaf clusters
- Armed Forces Reserve Medal with hourglass device
- Small Arms Expert Marksmanship Ribbon
- Air Force Training Ribbon
- Kuwait Liberation Medal (Saudi Arabia)
- Kuwait Liberation Medal (Kuwait)
- 1999 Awarded the Order of the Sword (United States)

== Assignments ==
- September 1967 – February 1968, student, undergraduate pilot training, Webb AFB, Texas
- February 1968 – January 1970, chief, programming and production, American Forces Radio and Television Services in Europe, Lindsay Air Station, West Germany
- January 1970 – January 1971, student, undergraduate pilot training, Columbus AFB, Miss.
- January 1971 – October 1971, student, F-4 Phantom upgrade training, Davis-Monthan AFB, Ariz.
- October 1971 – March 1974, F-4E pilot, 36th Tactical Fighter Wing, Bitburg Air Base, West Germany
- March 1974 – November 1974, air liaison officer and forward air controller, 19th Tactical Air Support Squadron, Republic of Korea Tiger Division, Camp Red Cloud, Osan Air Base, Korea
- November 1974 – May 1975, Cessna O-2 Skymaster instructor pilot, 547th and 549th Tactical Air Support Training Squadrons, Hurlburt Field, Fla.
- July 1975 – May 1977, 0-2A flying training instructor, 105th Tactical Air Support Group, Westchester Air National Guard Base, White Plains, N.Y.
- May 1977 – December 1979, operations officer, 137th Tactical Air Support Squadron, Westchester Air National Guard Base, White Plains, N.Y.
- December 1979 – December 1981, deputy commander for operations, 105th Tactical Air Support Group, Westchester Air National Guard Base, White Plains, N.Y.
- December 1981 – June 1984, director of operations, Headquarters New York Air National Guard, New Windsor, N.Y.
- June 1984 – October 1984, chief, manpower and personnel, Air National Guard Support Center, Andrews AFB, Md.
- October 1984 – August 1985, air operations staff director, state of New York, division of military and naval affairs, Albany, N.Y.
- August 1985 – January 1994, commander, 105th Airlift Group, Stewart Air National Guard Base, N.Y.
- January 1994 – January 1998, deputy director, Air National Guard, the Pentagon, Washington, D.C.
- January 1998 – January 2002, director, Air National Guard, Arlington, Va.

== Education ==
- 1967 Bachelor of Science degree in communicative arts, Ithaca College, Ithaca, New York
- 1973 Squadron Officer School, Maxwell Air Force Base, Ala.
- 1977 Air Command and Staff College
- 1984 Air War College
- 1993 Program for Senior Executives in National and International Security, Harvard University, Cambridge, Mass.
- 1996 Capstone, Fort Lesley J. McNair, Washington, D.C.

== Notes ==
Military offices
Preceded by Donald Shepperd	Director of the United States Air National Guard; 1998–2002	Succeeded by Daniel James III
