= Philip G. Killey =

United States Air Force general (1941–2026)

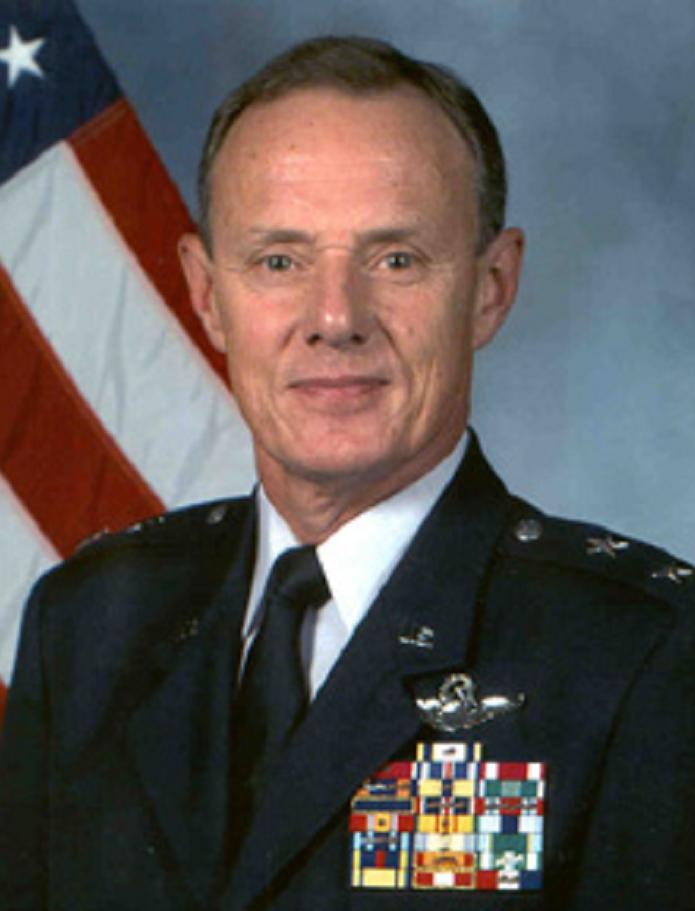
- Major General Philip G. Killey circa 1993
- Born: October 3, 1941; Monmouth, Illinois, U.S.
- Died: January 25, 2026 (aged 84); Scottsdale, Arizona, U.S.
- Alma mater: Monmouth College
- Military career
- Allegiance: United States
- Branch: United States Air Force
- Service years: 1963–2003
- Rank: Major General
- Commands: South Dakota National Guard; First Air Force; Air National Guard; 114th Tactical Fighter Group
- Conflicts: Vietnam War
- Awards: Air Force Distinguished Service Medal (2); Legion of Merit (2); Distinguished Flying Cross
- Other work: Defense consultant

Philip G. Killey (October 3, 1941 – January 25, 2026) was a United States Air Force officer. He attained the rank of major general, and served as Adjutant General of the South Dakota National Guard, Director of the Air National Guard and Commander of First Air Force.

== Early life ==
Philp G. Killey was born in Monmouth, Illinois, on October 1, 1941. He graduated from Monmouth High School in 1959, and received a Bachelor of Science degree in economics and mathematics from Monmouth College in 1963. While in college, he was a member of the football and track teams and a member of Theta Chi fraternity.

== Military career ==
Killey received his commission in 1963 through Air Force Officer Training School at Lackland Air Force Base, Texas. Upon qualification as an F-4 pilot he was assigned to Eglin Air Force Base, Florida.

During his career Killey attained the rating of command pilot and flew more than 6,500 hours. His list of military aircraft flown includes the T-37, T-38, F-4, F-100, A-7, F-16 and C-21.

From May 1967 to February 1968, Killey flew 129 combat missions as an F-4 fighter pilot in Southeast Asia during the Vietnam War, assigned to the 8th Tactical Fighter Wing at Ubon Royal Thai Air Force Base, Thailand. Overall, during his career he flew 6,500 flight hours in multiple aircraft.

He left active duty in 1969 and joined the South Dakota Air National Guard in 1970. He held a variety of training, staff and command positions, including Deputy Commander of the 114th Tactical Fighter Group. In March, 1983 he became Commander of the Group.

In March 1987 Killey was named Adjutant General of the South Dakota National Guard and promoted to brigadier general. He served until November 1988, when he was appointed Director of the Air National Guard and promoted to major general.

Killey served as Director of the Air National Guard until January 1994, and was acting Chief of the National Guard Bureau from December 1993 to January 1994. In January 1994 Killey was named Commander of First Air Force and Continental United States North American Aerospace Defense Command Region. He was the first National Guard officer to hold this position, and he served until January 1998.

From January 1998 until retiring in May 2003, Killey served again as Adjutant General of South Dakota.

== Retirement and death ==
After retiring from the military, Killey was a consultant on government, military and homeland security issues. He was also active in business, including a position on the advisory board of Previstar, Incorporated.

In 2009 the new First Air Force and Continental NORAD Region headquarters was dedicated as the Killey Center for Homeland Operations. Retired Major General Francis M. McGinn said, "General Killey was one of the original architects of today's Air National Guard".

Killey died on January 25, 2026, at the age of 84.

== Awards and decorations ==
- Air Force Distinguished Service Medal with oak leaf cluster
- Legion of Merit with oak leaf cluster
- Distinguished Flying Cross
- Meritorious Service Medal
- Air Medal with 12 oak leaf clusters
- Air Force Commendation Medal with oak leaf cluster
- Army Commendation Medal
- Presidential Unit Citation
- Air Force Outstanding Unit Award with three oak leaf clusters
- Combat Readiness Medal with four oak leaf clusters
- National Defense Service Medal with service star
- Vietnam Service Medal with service star
- Air Force Overseas Ribbon-Short
- Air Force Longevity Service Award Ribbon with seven oak leaf clusters
- Armed Forces Reserve Medal with hourglass device
- Small Arms Expert Marksmanship Ribbon
- Air Force Training Ribbon
- Vietnam Gallantry Cross with Palm Unit Citation
- Republic of Vietnam Campaign Medal
- South Dakota Distinguished Service Award
- South Dakota Distinguished Unit Award
- South Dakota National Guard Service Award with two oak leaf clusters
- 1993 Awarded the Order of the Sword (United States)

== Assignments ==
1. November 1963 – February 1965, Student, pilot training, Reese Air Force Base, Texas
2. August 1965 – May 1967, F-4 Pilot, Eglin Air Force Base, Fla.
3. May 1967 – February 1968, Combat Fighter Pilot, 555th Tactical Fighter Squadron, Ubon Royal Thai Air Force Base, Thailand
4. February 1968 – July 1969, F-4 Instructor Pilot, 68th Tactical Fighter Squadron, George Air Force Base, Calif.
5. August 1970 – March 1973, Squadron Fighter Pilot, 114th Tactical Fighter Group, South Dakota Air National Guard, Sioux Falls, S.D.
6. March 1973 – October 1974, Air Technician Flying Training Instructor, 114th Tactical Fighter Group, South Dakota Air National Guard, Sioux Falls, S.D.
7. October 1974 – April 1975, Outstanding Graduate F-100 Fighter Weapons School Arizona Air National Guard, Tucson, AZ.
8. April 1975 – September 1978, Group Weapons Tactics Officer and Chief of Standardization and Evaluation, 114th Tactical Fighter Group, South Dakota Air National Guard, Sioux Falls, S.D.
9. September 1978 – March 1983, Deputy Commander for Operations, 114th Tactical Fighter Group, South Dakota Air National Guard, Sioux Falls, S.D.
10. March 1983 – March 1987, Commander, 114th Tactical Fighter Group, South Dakota Air National Guard, Sioux Falls, S.D.
11. March 1987 – November 1988, Adjutant General, South Dakota National Guard, Rapid City, S.D.
12. November 1988 – January 1994, Director, Air National Guard, Washington D.C.
13. January 1994 – January 1998, Commander, 1st Air Force, Air Combat Command, and Continental United States North American Aerospace Defense Command Region, Tyndall Air Force Base, Fla.
14. May 1998 – Feb 2003, Adjutant General, South Dakota National Guard, Rapid City, S.D.

Military offices
Preceded by John B. Conaway	Director of the United States Air National Guard; 1988–1994	Succeeded by Donald Shepperd
Preceded by John B. Conaway	Chief of the National Guard Bureau (Acting); December 1993 – January 1994	Succeeded by Raymond F. Rees
