= Donald Shepperd =

United States Air Force general

Donald W. Shepperd
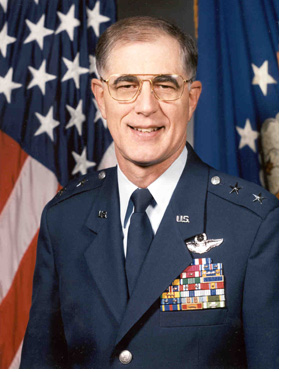
- Donald W. Shepperd
- Born: September 14, 1940 (age 86)
- Military career
- Allegiance: United States
- Branch: United States Air Force
- Service years: 1962–1998
- Rank: Major General
- Commands: Air National Guard
- Conflicts: Vietnam War
- Awards: Silver Star; Legion of Merit; Distinguished Flying Cross (3)

Major general Donald William Shepperd (born 1940) is a retired United States Air Force officer who served as the director of the Air National Guard from 28 January 1994 to 28 January 1998. Shepperd holds a master of science degree from Troy State University and attended the Air War College at Maxwell Air Force Base, Alabama. He graduated from the United States Air Force Academy in 1962 as a distinguished graduate. The retired major general has also functioned as a military aviation analyst for CNN. His wife is Rose.

Shepperd is also the author or co-author of several books:

- Bury Us Upside Down.
- Fly Girl
- The Class of '58 Writes a Book
- Chronicle Series
  - Wonder Years - The Wheat Ridge Chronicles
  - Big Mama & Daddy Zach - The South Texas Chronicles
  - Think Like a Trout - The Frying Pan Chronicles
  - Bwana Shep - The African Chronicles
  - Mayday - The Vietnam Chronicles
  - Mr. Dumbsquat – The Academy Chronicles

In 2010 the new Air National Guard Readiness Center was named Shepperd Hall after him.

== Major awards and decorations ==
- Silver Star
- Legion of Merit
- Distinguished Flying Cross with two oak leaf clusters
- Meritorious Service Medal with one bronze oak leaf cluster
- Air Medal with three silver oak leaf clusters
- Air Force Commendation Medal
- Army Commendation Medal
- Armed Forces Reserve Medal
- Vietnam Air Gallantry Cross

== Assignments ==
- September 1962 – October 1963, student, undergraduate pilot training, Williams Air Force Base, AZ.
- October 1963 – July 1964, student, North American F-100 Super Sabre combat crew training, Luke AFB, AZ.
- July 1964 – October 1966, F-100 squadron pilot, 81st Tactical Fighter Squadron (TFS), Hahn Air Base, West Germany.
- October 1966 – October 1967, air liaison officer, 24th Infantry Division, Augsburg, West Germany.
- October 1967 – December 1967, F-100 squadron pilot, 90th TFS, Bien Hoa Air Base, South Vietnam.
- December 1967 – April 1968, F-100 squadron pilot (MISTY FAC), 416th TFS, Phù Cát Air Base, South Vietnam.
- April 1968 – October 1968, F-100 instructor pilot, 90th TFS, Bien Hoa Air Base, South Vietnam.
- October 1968 – October 1969, Cessna A-37 Dragonfly instructor pilot, 4532nd TFS, England AFB, LA.
- May 1970 – August 1973, forward air controller (Cessna O-2 Skymaster), 103 Tactical Air Support Squadron, Naval Air Station Willow Grove, PA.
- August 1974 – August 1978, F-100 instructor pilot, 152nd TFS, Tucson Air National Guard Base, AZ.
- August 1978 – March 1983, squadron commander (LTV A-7 Corsair II), 152nd TFS, Tucson ANGB, AZ.
- March 1983 – December 1984, deputy commander for operations (A-7), 162 Tactical Fighter Group, Tucson ANGB, AZ.
- December 1984 – August 1985, vice commander (A-7), 162 Tactical Fighter Group, Tucson ANGB, AZ.
- August 1985 – September 1986, student, Air War College and Research Fellow Center for Aerospace Doctrine and Education (Cadre), Maxwell AFB, AL.
- September 1986 – November 1986, acting deputy chief, Operations and Plans Division, National Guard Bureau, Pentagon, Washington, D.C.
- November 1986 – January 1987, vice commander (A-7), 162 Tactical Fighter Group, Tucson ANGB, AZ.
- January 1987 – July 1989, air commander (McDonnell Douglas F-15 Eagle), Hq 102nd Fighter Interceptor Wing, Otis ANGB, MA.
- July 1989 – January 1994, deputy director, Air National Guard, Pentagon, Washington, D.C.
- January 1994 – January 1998, director, Air National Guard, Pentagon, Washington, D.C.

Military offices
| Preceded by Philip G. Killey | Director of the United States Air National Guard; 1994–1998 | Succeeded by Paul A. Weaver |
