= John T. Guice =

United States Air Force general

- Born: 5 November 1923; Kosciusko, Mississippi, U.S.
- Died: 1 October 2001 (aged 77); Tucson, Arizona, U.S.
- Military career
- Allegiance: United States
- Branch: United States Air Force
- Service years: 1944–1982
- Rank: Major General
- Commands: Air National Guard
- Conflicts: World War II
- Awards: Air Force Distinguished Service Medal; Legion of Merit (2)

John Thompson Guice (5 November 1923 – 1 October 2001) was a senior United States Air Force officer who served as the director of the Air National Guard from February 1977 to April 1981.

He completed pilot training in May 1944, and graduated from the United States Military Academy at West Point in 1947. He was a graduate of Air War College Commemorative History class of 1966. In 1972, Guice was assigned as executive of the National Guard Bureau, moving up to deputy director of the Air National Guard in 1974 and director in 1977.

== Notes and references ==
Military offices
Preceded by John J. Pesch	Director of the United States Air National Guard; 1977–1981	Succeeded by John B. Conaway
