= 123rd Special Tactics Squadron =

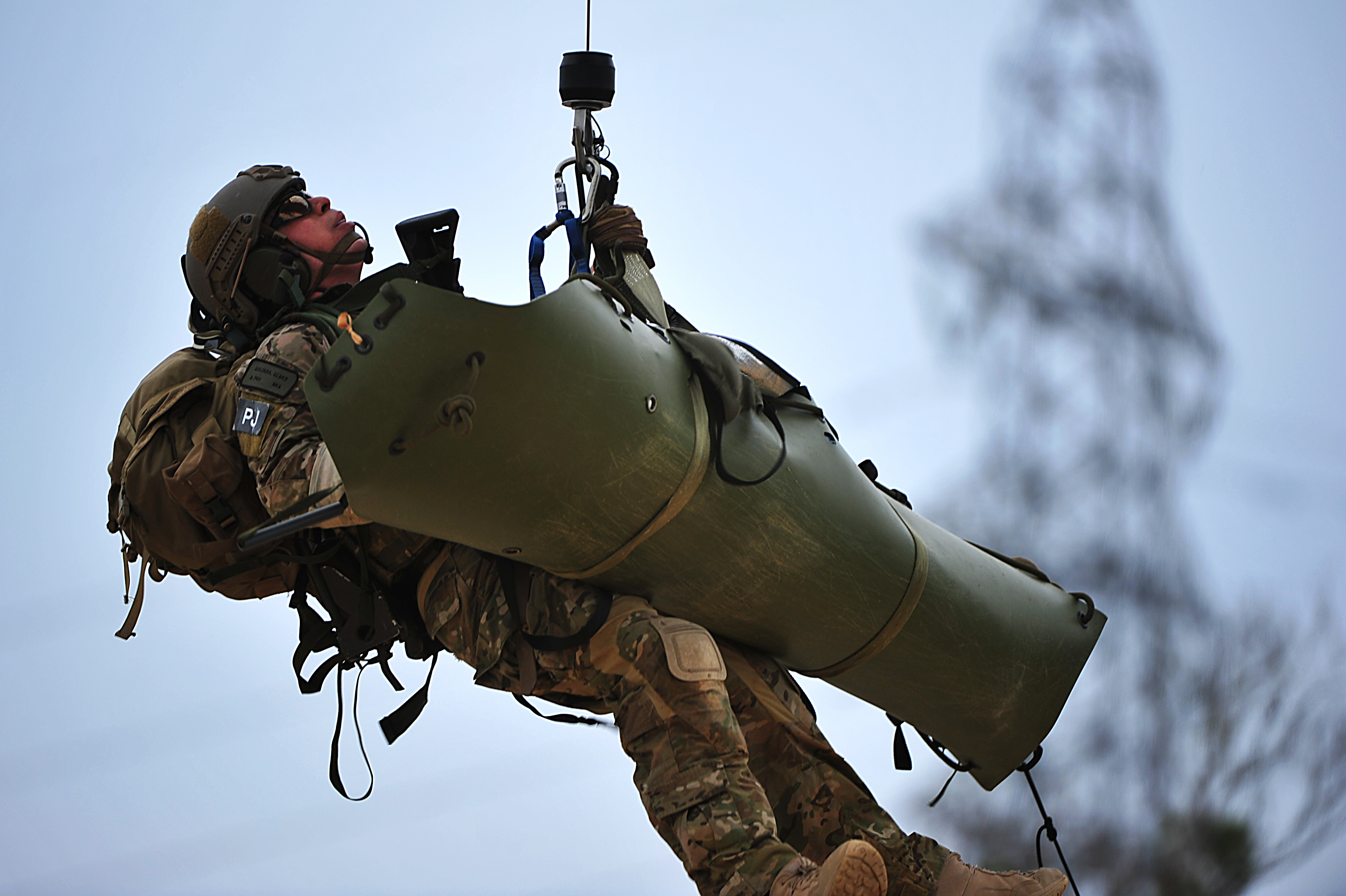
- 123rd Special Tactics Squadron pararescueman, is hoisted into a HH-60 Pave Hawk helicopter
- Active: Present
- Country: United States of America
- Branch: Air National Guard
- Type: Special Operations Force
- Role: Special Operations
- Part of: Kentucky Air National Guard
- Garrison/HQ: Louisville International Airport (Louisville Air National Guard Base)
- Motto: Ingenium superat vires (Ingenuity surpasses strength)
- Engagements: Operation Iraqi Freedom; War in Afghanistan

Insignia
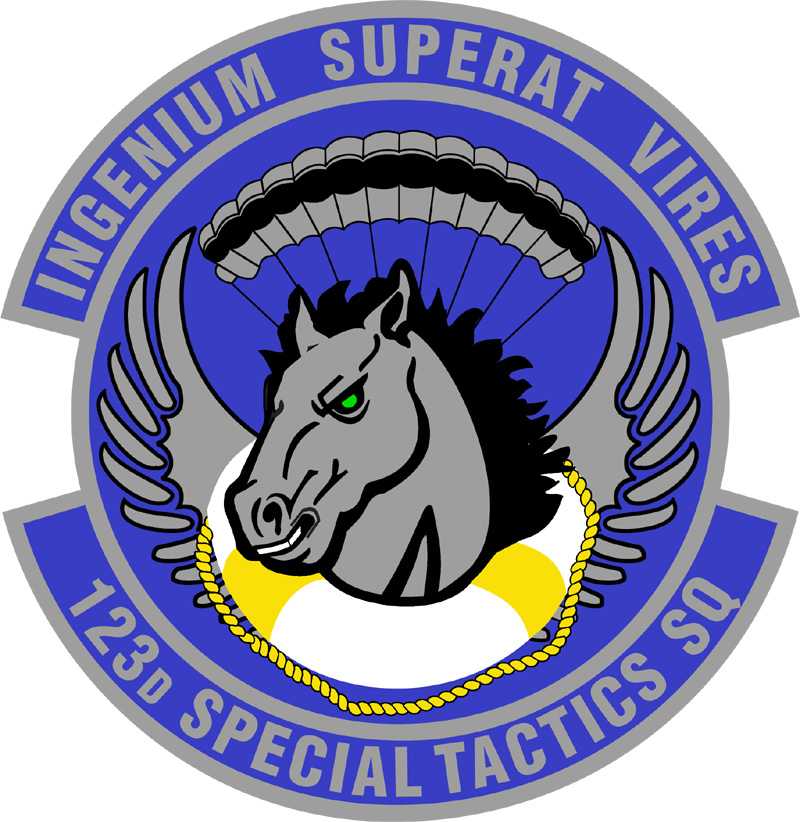
- 123rd Special Tactics Squadron Emblem

The 123rd Special Tactics Squadron is a special operations unit of the Kentucky Air National Guard 123d Airlift Wing stationed at Louisville International Airport (Louisville Air National Guard Base), Kentucky. The 123rd STS is one of only two Special Tactics Units in the Air National Guard.

== Mission ==
The squadron provides tactical air and ground integration force and the Air Force’s special operations ground force leading global access, precision strike, personnel recovery operations and battlefield surgery.

The Special Tactics Squadron consist of:

- Combat Controllers (CCT) - who are FAA-certified air traffic controllers and establish air control and provide combat support directing air strikes in close proximity to friendly forces as Joint Terminal Attack Controllers (JTACs).
- Pararescuemen (PJ) - primary mission is personnel recovery in hostile areas and are expert combat medical professionals.
- Special Reconnaissance (SR) – Special Reconnaissance Airmen are trained in surveillance and reconnaissance, electronic warfare (EW), long-range precision engagement and target interdiction, small unmanned aircraft systems.

Members of the 123rd Special Tactics Squadron benefit from the extensive knowledge of their information technology support staff and these assets are considered "force multipliers" by both pararescuemen and combat control team members. They are trained in numerous infiltration methods that include: static-line and military free-fall parachuting, scuba, small boats, all-terrain vehicles, mountain ski and hiking, rappelling and fast rope.

== History ==
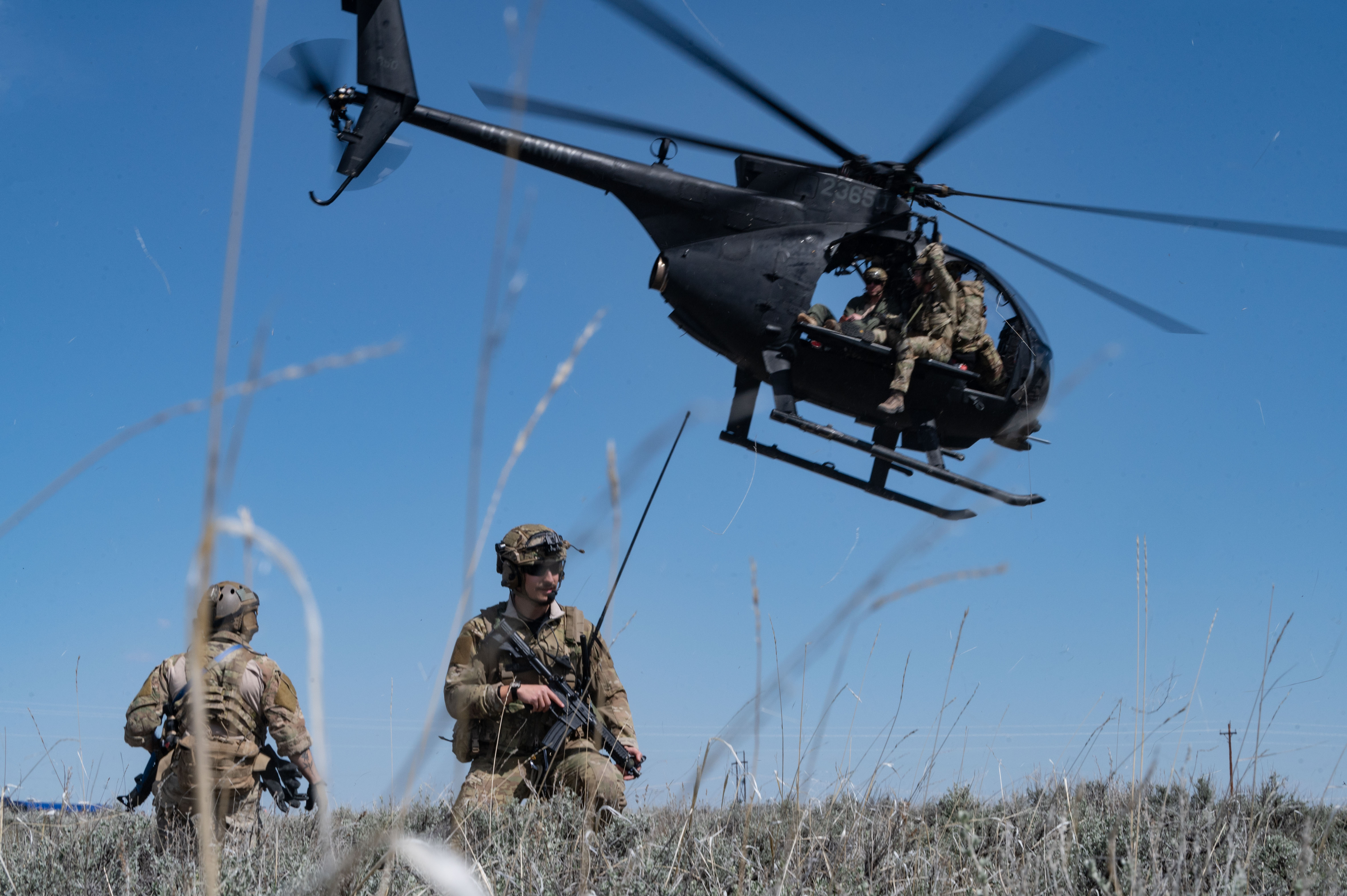
123rd Special Tactics Squadron operators during Exercise Agile Chariot, May 2, 2023, honing capabilities linked to Agile Combat Employment (ACE)

The Air Force Cross was awarded to 123rd STS Pararescueman then-Tech. Sgt. Keary Miller during the Battle of Takur Ghar a.k.a. the Battle of Roberts Ridge on March 4, 2002. Kerry was part of a small US Air Force team embedded with US Army special forces during the operation in Afghanistan. During the 17-hour long battle Tech. Sgt. Miller repeatedly risked his life to administer critical first aid to several injured US servicemen during the battle.

The squadron provided personnel during the aftermath of the devastating Hurricane Maria that hit the Caribbean in 2017. September 2018, The 123rd special operators were sent to the Carolinas after Tropical Storm Florence to provide search-and-rescue assistance.

In August 2019, Tech. Sgt. Daniel Keller, a combat controller in the 123rd Special Tactics Squadron, was awarded the Air Force Cross. Keller earned the award — second only to the Medal of Honor — for valor on the battlefield in Afghanistan whilst participating in Operation Freedom’s Sentinel.
