= 123rd Airlift Wing =

Unit of the Kentucky Air National Guard

123rd Airlift Wing

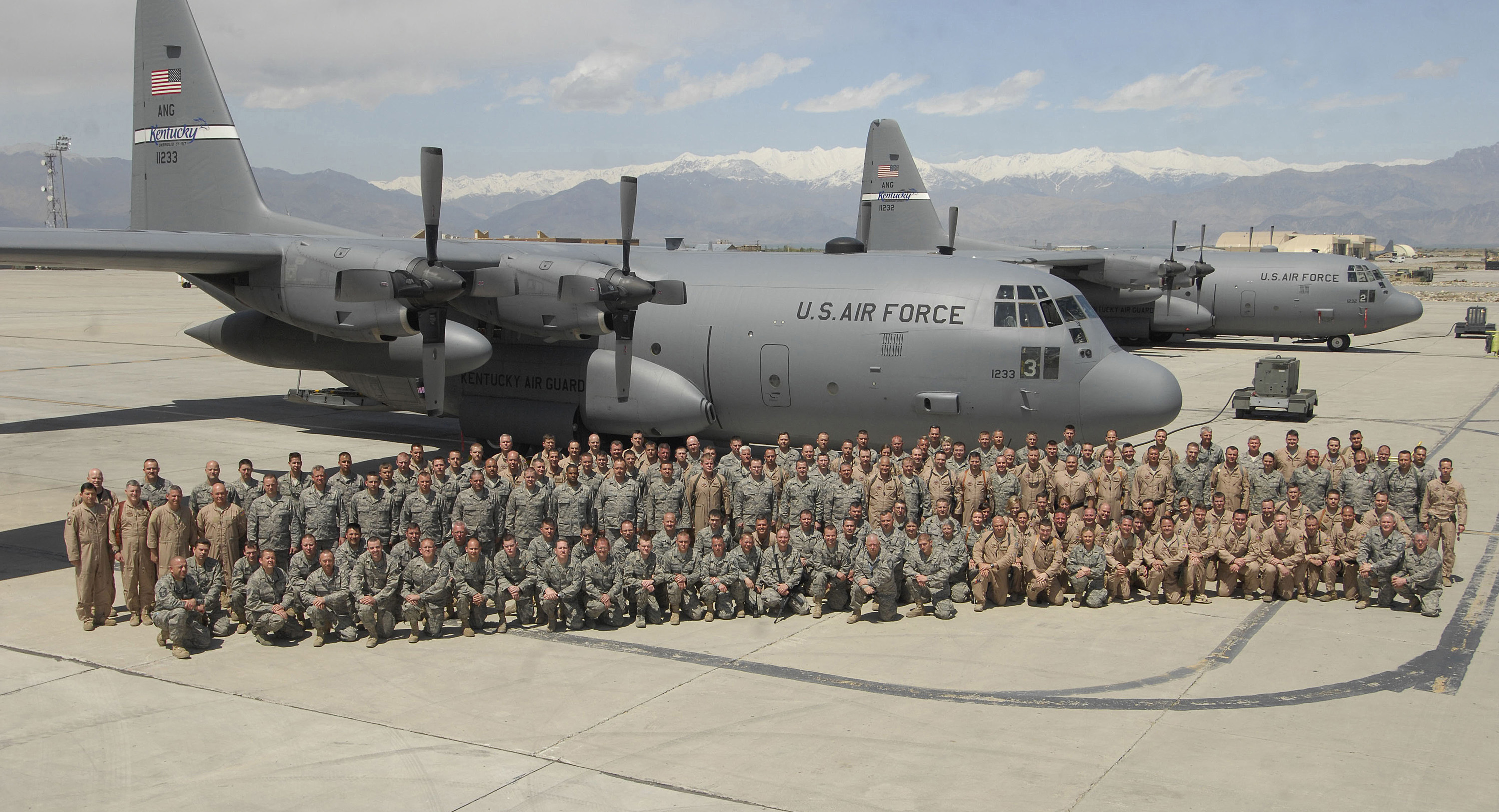
- Deployed U.S. Air Force members of the 123rd Airlift Wing (Note: Aircraft are Lockheed C-130H Hercules aircraft, serial numbers 91–1232 and 91–1233 on a flightline in Afghanistan. Taken 22 April 2009.)
- Active: 1950–1952; 1952–present
- Country: United States
- Allegiance: Kentucky
- Branch: Air National Guard
- Type: Wing
- Role: Airlift
- Part of: Kentucky Air National Guard
- Garrison/HQ: Louisville International Airport (Louisville Air National Guard Base), Kentucky
- Motto: Fortune Assists The Brave (Note: Originally approved in Latin: Fortes Fortuna Juvat. Maurer, p. 243.)
- Decorations: Air Force Outstanding Unit Award

Insignia
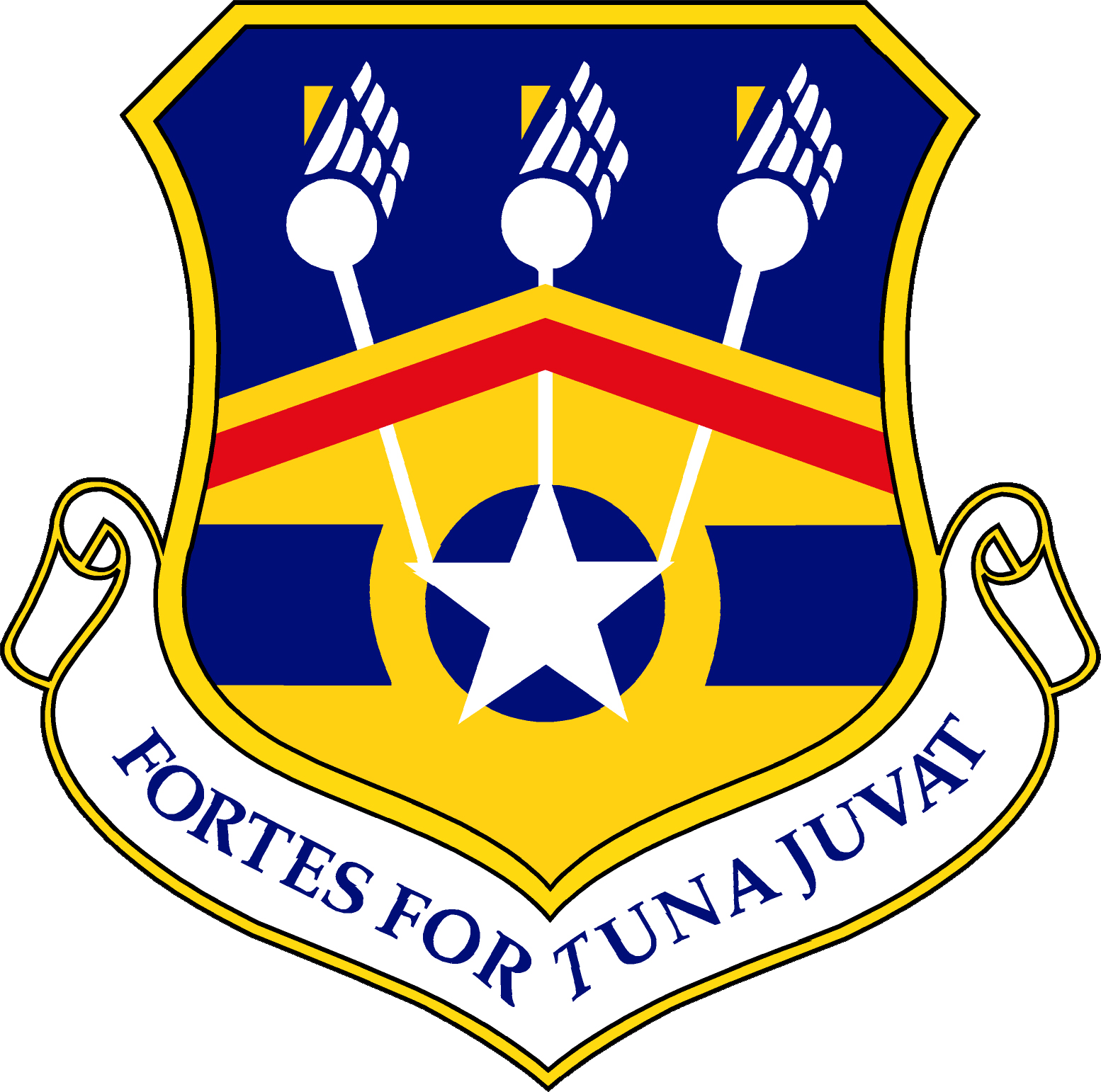
- 123rd Airlift Wing emblem

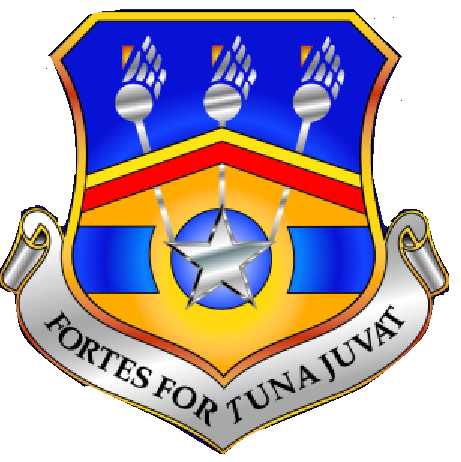
- 123rd Fighter-Bomber Wing emblem (Note: Approved 20 December 1951. Maurer, p. 243.)
- Tail Stripe: Kentucky

The 123rd Airlift Wing (123 AW) is a unit of the Kentucky Air National Guard, stationed at Louisville International Airport (Louisville Air National Guard Base), Kentucky. If activated to federal service, the Wing is gained by the United States Air Force Air Mobility Command.

== Overview ==
The Kentucky Air National Guard's 123rd Airlift Wing mission is to provide worldwide theater airlift for U.S. military and humanitarian operations. The wing is equipped with eight C-130J Hercules aircraft. Multiple groups, squadrons and flights carry out the unit's mission by providing administrative and logistical support, including airlift operations, combat control, pararescue, maintenance, supply, transportation, contracting, communications, civil engineering, personnel, base services, security forces and medical functions.

In November 2021, the 123rd was re-equipped with C-130J Super Hercules

== Units ==
The 123rd Airlift Wing consists of the following units:

- 123rd Operations Group
  - 165th Airlift Squadron
  - 123rd Special Tactics Squadron
- 123rd Maintenance Group
- 123rd Mission Support Group
- 123rd Medical Group
- 123rd Contingency Response Group

== History ==
=== Korean War Federalization ===
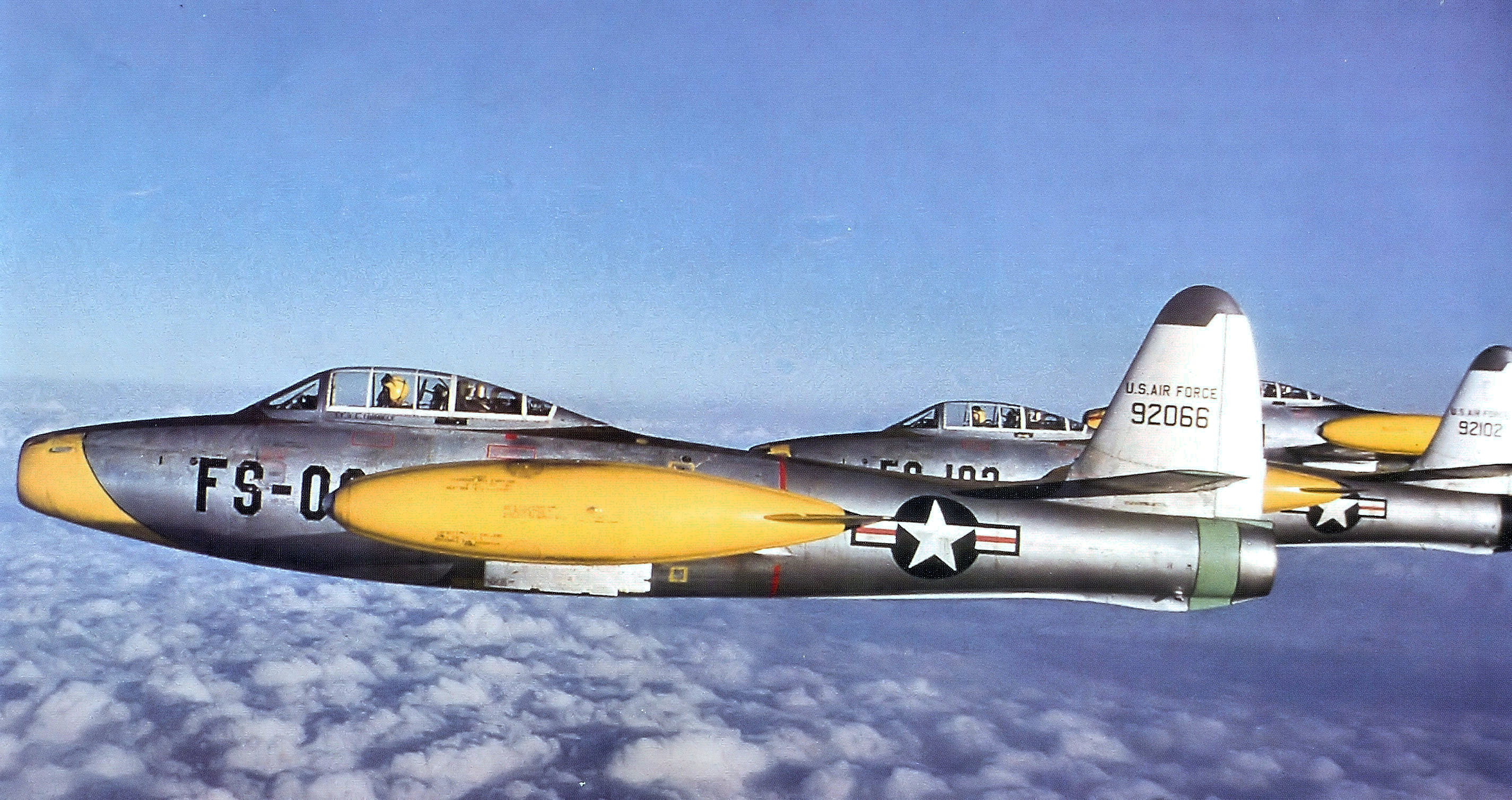
Republic F-84E Thunderjet flown by the 123rd Fighter Group at RAF Manston, England

With the surprise invasion of South Korea on 25 June 1950, the 123rd Fighter Group and its component squadrons were mobilized into federal active duty at Godman Air Force Base at Fort Knox, Kentucky. Shortly after being federalized, the group and its support units of the 223rd Air Service Group were reorganized under the wing base organization and the 123rd Fighter-Bomber Wing was activated to control the operational and support elements that had been mobilized.

After over a year of training at Godman, the 123rd deployed to RAF Manston, Kent, England to replace the Strategic Air Command (SAC) 12th Fighter-Escort Wing which returned to Bergstrom Air Force Base, Texas. In England, the mission of the 123rd was to provide fighter escort for SAC Boeing B-50 Superfortress and Convair B-36 Peacemaker bombers while flying over Western European airspace on their deterrence alert missions. The 123rd left their F-51Ds at Godman AFB and the personnel boarded C-47s to Westover Air Force Base, Massachusetts and later to transport ships to England. They arrived in early December, 1951 at Manston where they began conversion training on Republic F-84E Thunderjets.

The training program began with the inexperienced F-51D pilots experiencing training difficulties with the jet aircraft, with several aircraft being lost in accidents. However, by March 1952 the unit was judged to be 80% combat ready on the Thunderjets. However, the period of federalization for the 123rd was expiring and in July 1952, the unit personnel were returned to the United States, the aircraft at Manston being passed on to the active duty 406th Fighter-Bomber Wing took over its personnel and equipment.

=== Tactical Fighter mission ===
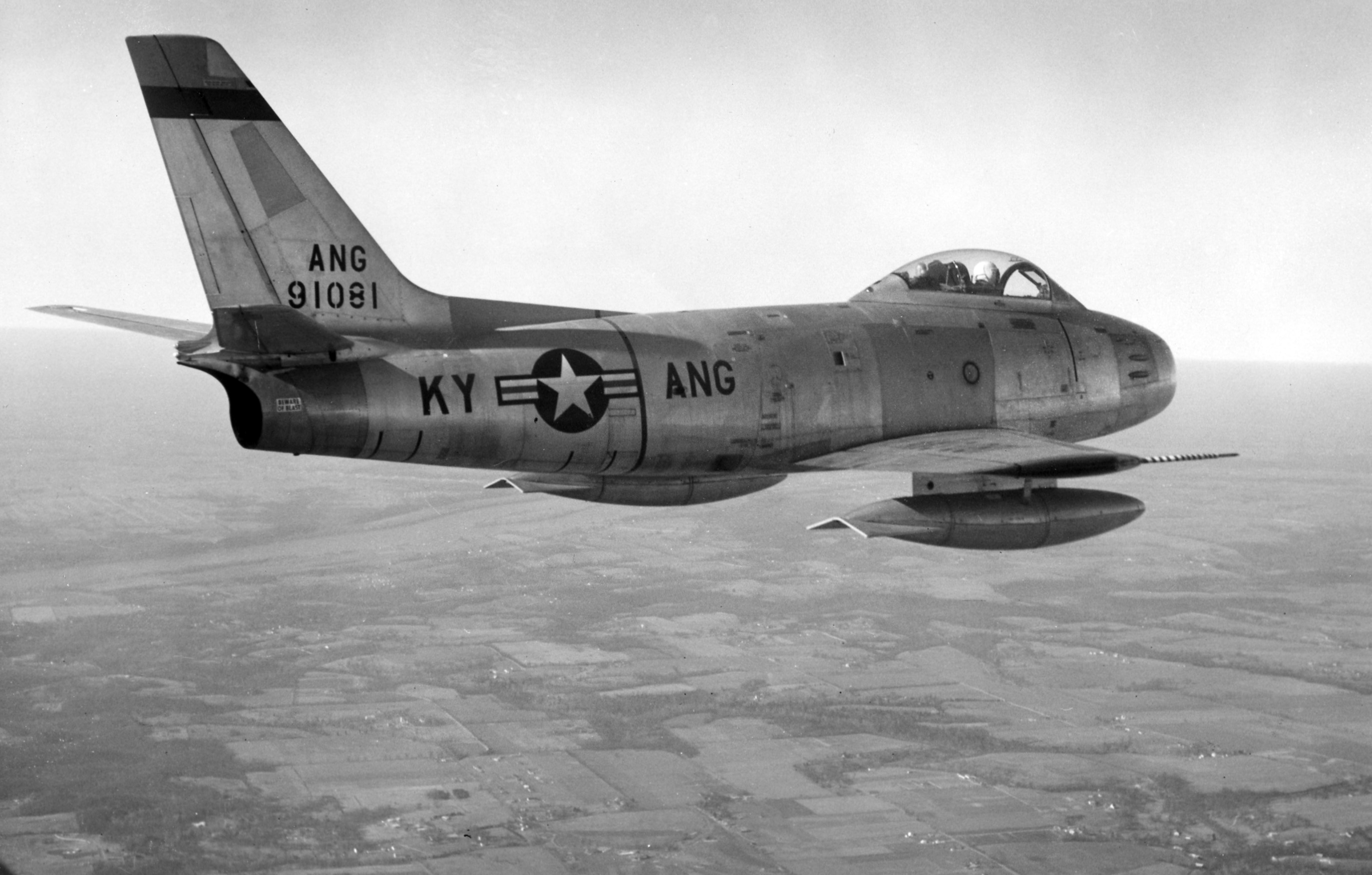
Kentucky ANG F-86A Sabre

After returning from England, the unit re-formed at Louisville. Because most jet aircraft were still in USAF use, the squadron received P-51D Mustangs and initially returned to its pre-federalization air defense mission, being designated as a fighter interceptor unit. However, with the P-51s, the Kentucky Air National Guard was limited to daylight training only.

On 1 January 1953, the wing was transferred to Tactical Air Command jurisdiction and re-equipped with refurbished North American F-86A Sabre air superiority fighter. With the switchover to TAC, the unit designation was changed to "Fighter-Bomber".

=== Tactical Reconnaissance mission ===
The wing only flew the Sabre for two years, when it was re-equipped with Martin RB-57A Canberra reconnaissance aircraft and became the 123rd Tactical Reconnaissance Wing.. The 123rd became a Tactical Reconnaissance Wing, in which it would remain for the next thirty years.

The wing would perform day and night, high and low, and visual and photographic reconnaissance. Unlike the Sabre fighters, the RB-57A was totally unarmed. The crew was two—one pilot and one photo-navigator One of their major activities of the 123rd in the United States was to carry out photographic surveys of areas hit by natural disasters such as hurricanes or tornadoes. In 1965, the 123rd was awarded its second Spaatz Trophy for superior combat readiness and flight training.

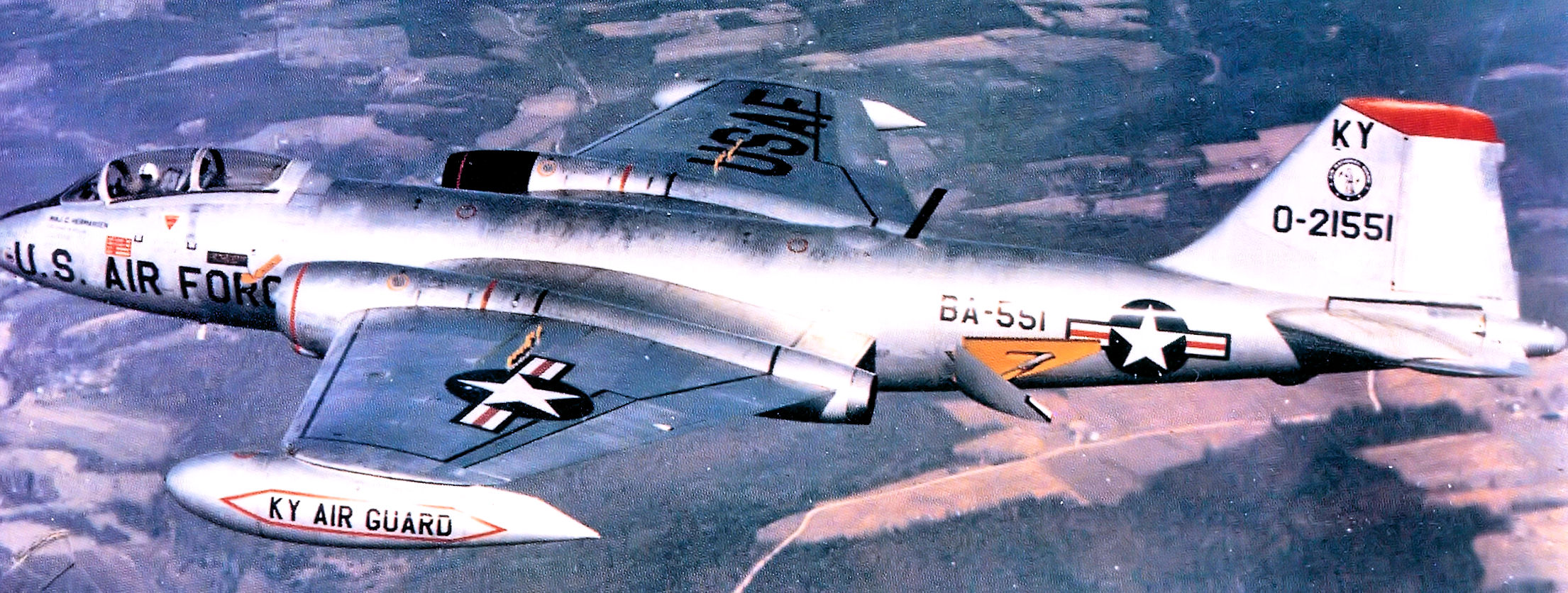
KY ANG Martin B-57B Canberra, about 1963

In 1965, the unit transferred its RB-57s to active duty to be deployed to South Vietnam. In return the 123rd was re-equipped, receiving the RF-101G Voodoo. The RF-101G was a derivative aircraft from twenty-nine ex-USAF F-101A Tactical Fighters that were withdrawn from fighter duty and were modified by Lockheed Aircraft Service Company of Ontario, California to serve as unarmed tactical reconnaissance aircraft for use by the Air National Guard. These aircraft were redesignated as RF-101G. As compared to the RF-101A dedicated photo-reconnaissance version of the F-101A, the RF-101G had a shorter and broader nose. These aircraft went to the Kentucky Air National Guard in July 1965, replacing the RB-57B.

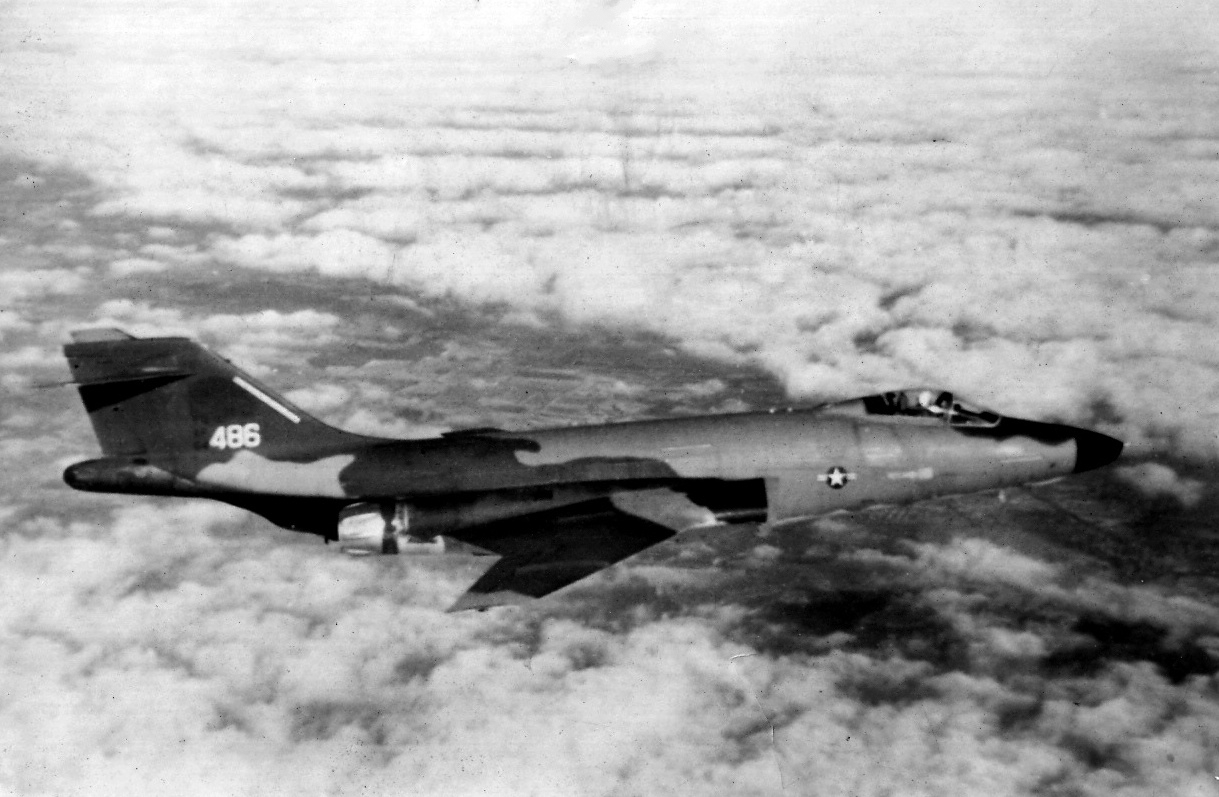
Kentucky ANG RF-101H flying a combat mission in South Vietnam, 1968

On 26 January 1968, the Pueblo Crisis precipitated the 123rd's recall to federal service. The unit flew just under 20,000 tactical flying hours with the RF-101G and delivered nearly 320,000 reconnaissance prints to requesting agencies. Assigned personnel served on active duty for 16 months.

The 123rd experienced a rocky tour of active duty. The wing had not been rated combat-ready when mobilized on 26 January 1968 primarily due to equipment shortages. It was not part of Secretary McNamara's Selected Reserve Force. The unit was given an unsatisfactory ORI rating in October 1968. Despite those problems, the 123rd made a significant contribution to active force operations. It began functioning as the primary Air Force tactical reconnaissance unit in the continental U.S. Elements of its squadrons rotated temporary duty assignments in Japan and South Korea from July 1968 until April 1969 providing photo reconnaissance support to American forces in those areas, including service in South Vietnam flying combat reconnaissance missions.

The 123rd was released from active duty and returned to Kentucky state control on 8 June 1969. The wing earned its first Air Force Outstanding Unit Award for its exceptional performance during this period.

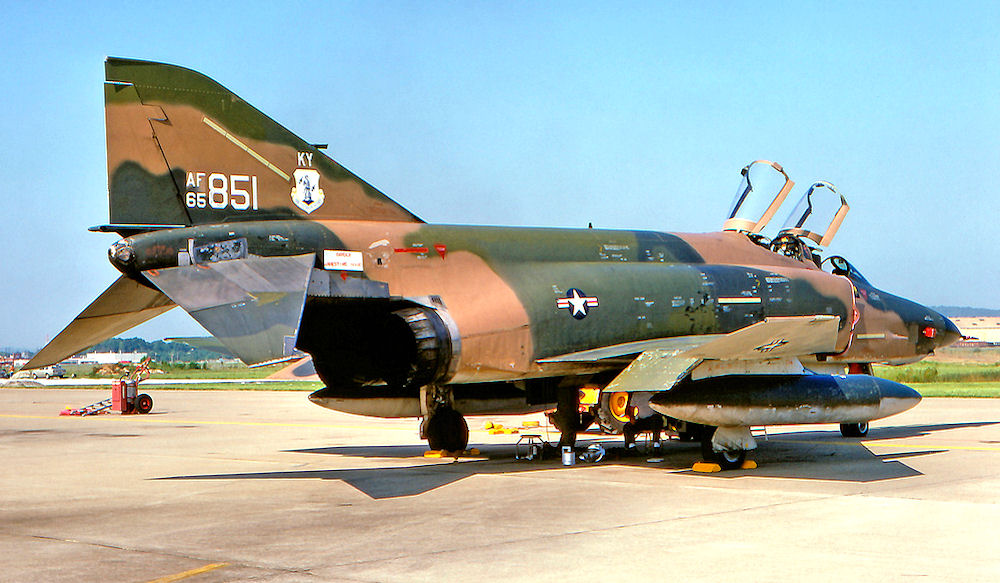
165th Tactical Reconnaissance Squadron – McDonnell RF-4C-25-MC Phantom 65-0851

In 1971, there was a re-organization of Air National Guard tactical reconnaissance units, with all the RF-101Gs being sent to the Arkansas Air National Guard's 184th Tactical Reconnaissance Squadron. The Kentucky ANG transferred its RF-101Gs to the Arkansas ANG and transitioned to the RF-101H Voodoo, a follow-on to the RF-101G. Being derived from the F-101C tactical fighter, the RF-101H differed from the RF-101G in having a strengthened airframe designed to allow maneuvers at up to 7.33 G. and having different fuel pumps and fuel feed and control systems, increasing its maximum available afterburner time from six minutes to 15.

During 1976, a no-notice conversion announced by the National Guard Bureau brought the two-seat RF-4C Phantom II to the Kentucky Air National Guard, with the RF-101Hs aircraft being retired to AMARC. The unit attained combat-ready status within seven months—a record time. The Phantom years were marked with many overseas deployments, participation in international photo reconnaissance competitions and a remarkable flight safety record. In 1981, the unit placed first in the Air National Guard Photo Finish Competition and earned an unprecedented third Spaatz Trophy.

In May 1983 the unit reached another historic milestone when it earned the highest possible rating from Tactical Air Command during its Operational Readiness Inspection. This was the first time that a TAC unit had received an outstanding rating. On 1 January 1989 the unit was awarded its seventh Air Force Outstanding Unit Award—a record for any Air National Guard unit.

=== Tactical airlift ===
The collapse of the Soviet Union and the dissolution of the Warsaw Pact led to accelerated retirement plans for active duty USAF RF-4Cs. In 1988, the Kentucky Air National Guard's Phantoms were sent to AMARC, and on 9 January 1989 the 123rd was officially re-designated the 123rd Tactical Airlift Wing and began conversion to the C-130B Hercules transport aircraft. By the end of the year, the unit had been involved in many worldwide airlift missions, including Exercise Volant Oak in Panama. The unit also participated in an airlift competition, Sentry Rodeo. The wing's first humanitarian airlift came in the aftermath of Hurricane Hugo.

Although the wing's 165th Tactical Airlift Squadron was not federally mobilized for Operations Desert Shield and Desert Storm, unit volunteers served during the conflict. From August 1990 to March 1991, the 165th flew 1,240 airlift sorties worldwide in direct support of the Gulf War—the most for any Air National Guard unit. An additional 88 wing members were activated in support of Desert Shield/Storm.

=== Post Cold War era ===
In May 1992 the 123rd received the 2000th C-130 straight off the assembly line as it began conversion to the C-130H Hercules. Eight months later, the 123rd deployed to Mombassa, Kenya, to fly relief missions into Somalia for Operation Restore Hope and Operation Provide Relief. Citizen-soldiers from the 123rd flew 150 sorties and transported 720 tons of relief supplies and 1,444 passengers into some of the hardest-hit areas in Somalia.

When the world's attention shifted to Eastern Europe in February 1993, the 123rd responded again, deploying in support of Operation Provide Promise. The unit flew 1,082 airdrop and air-land sorties and delivered 2,215 tons of food and supplies into war-torn Bosnia-Herzegovina. To support the operation, the wing deployed 451 personnel into Rhein-Main Air Base, Germany, over several rotations until May 1994.

In July 1994 the 123rd answered another call for help and deployed within 72 hours of notification to fly relief missions into Rwanda and Zaire for Operation Support Hope. Operating out of Mombassa, Kenya, unit personnel flew 147 sorties, transporting 652.5 tons of relief supplies to the beleaguered Rwandan refugees. Personnel from the unit's 205th Combat Communications Squadron also deployed to Haiti that year as part of Operation Uphold Democracy, providing satellite communications links for the theater commander.

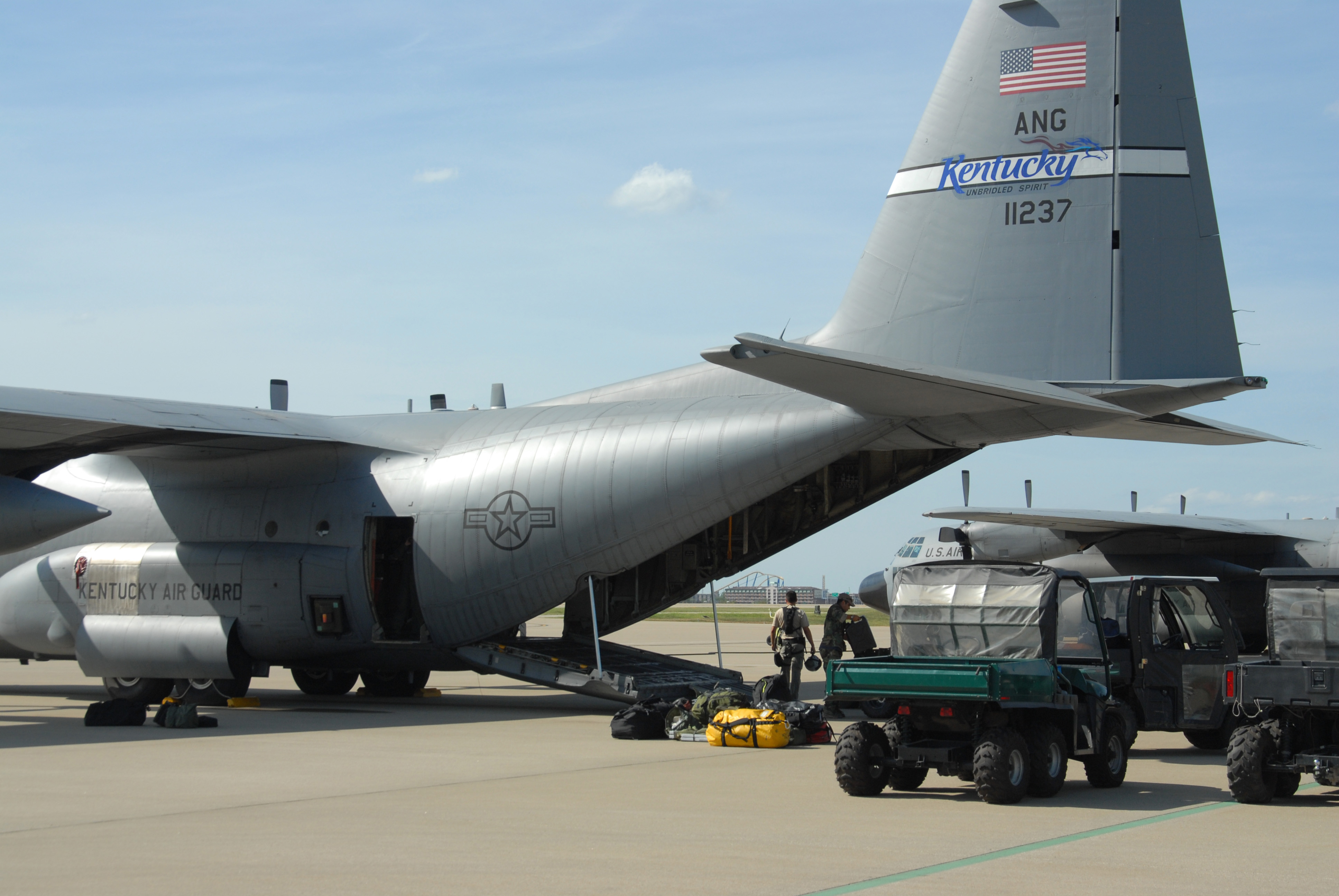
Members of the Kentucky Air Guard's 123rd Special Tactics Squadron load rescue gear onto a C-130 for deployment to coastal Texas .

In September 1994 the wing's sustained record of achievement was recognized by award of the 1993 Curtis N. Rusty Metcalf Trophy, presented annually to the best Air National Guard airlift or air refueling unit. The wing also earned the Air National Guard Distinguished Flying Unit Plaque and Air Force Flight Safety Plaque. In November 1994 the unit was granted its eighth Air Force Outstanding Unit Award.

The wing returned to Bosnia in 1996 to provide airlift for U.S. and NATO troops who were protecting the fragile peace. More than 170 Kentuckians volunteered for the mission, which delivered 913 tons of cargo and transported 2,296 passengers. The wing also achieved the highest readiness rate of any unit in the theater. That commitment to service continued in 1997, when the unit participated in several overseas deployments while offering a helping hand at home. More than 100 Kentucky Air Guard troops provided security forces, medical aid, communications links and civil engineering crews after record flooding ravaged several Kentucky communities.

The unit also made its presence felt overseas, offering civil engineering skills in Spain and airlift services in Saudi Arabia as part of Operation Southern Watch, which enforced the no-fly zone in Southern Iraq. Other wing members deployed to Egypt as part of a multinational training exercise that integrated 7,000 troops from every branch of the U.S. military and six foreign countries.

In February 1998, the 123rd Airlift Wing received its ninth Air Force Outstanding Unit Award. The following month, the wing accepted its sixth Distinguished Flying Unit Plaque, recognizing the 123rd Airlift Wing as one of the top five Air Guard flying units in the nation for 1997. A mere three months later, the wing as presented with the 15th Air Force Reserve Forces Trophy as the top reserve unit in the numbered Air Force.

1998 continued the 123rd Airlift Wing's tradition of global deployments with missions to Panama as part of Operation Coronet Oak and Ecuador for Nuevos Horizontes '98. The latter operation, whose name means New Horizons in Spanish, was a Southern Command joint training exercise that gave Kentucky Army and Air Guard engineers the opportunity to fine-tune military skills while constructing clinics, schools, and latrines in rural areas of the South American nation. Nearly 1,300 of the Commonwealth's citizen-soldiers participated in the effort, which also provided impoverished Ecuadorians with basic dental and medical care.

The following year, the wing returned to Bosnia once more to provide theater airlift for the continuing peacekeeping mission, now called Operation Joint Forge. More than 350 Kentucky aircrew, maintainers, and support personnel deployed for the operation, along with about 200 members of the Ohio Air National Guard's 179th Airlift Wing.

The two unit's C-130s flew nearly 500 sorties during the deployment, delivering 3,500 passengers and more than 1,000 tons of cargo to sites across Europe and inside Bosnia, including Sarajevo and Tuzla. The units also were tasked with helping stockpile equipment for what became Operation Allied Force, the NATO air campaign against Serbian forces in the former Republic of Yugoslavia. Working around the clock with the 37th Airlift Squadron at Ramstein Air Base, Germany, the Kentucky and Ohio crews flew more than 70 tons of fighter support equipment from U.S. bases in England and Germany to bases in Italy. The Kentucky Air Guard closed out 1999 by again deploying for Operation Southern Watch, providing theater airlift services from an air base in Muscat, Oman.

=== Air Expeditionary deployments ===
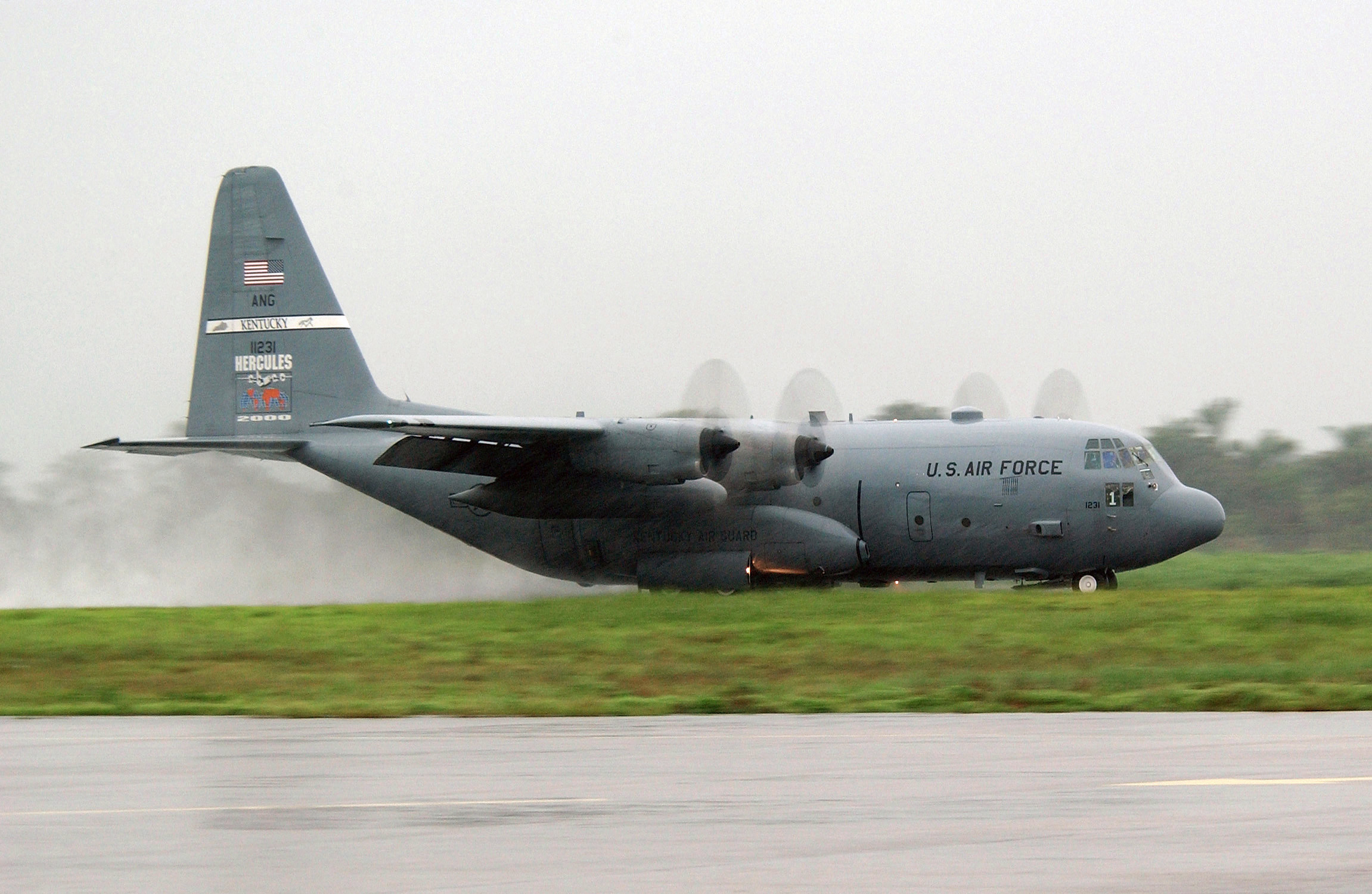
A U.S. Air Force Lockheed C-130H Hercules (s/n 91-1231) from the 165th Airlift Squadron, 123rd Airlift Wing, Kentucky Air National Guard, lands at Lungi, Sierra Leone, on 21 July 2003.

In mid-1996, the Air Force, in response to budget cuts, and changing world situations, began experimenting with Air Expeditionary organizations. The Air Expeditionary Force (AEF) concept was developed that would mix Active-Duty, Reserve and Air National Guard elements into a combined force. Instead of entire permanent units deploying as "Provisional" as in the 1991 Gulf War, Expeditionary units are composed of "aviation packages" from several wings, including active-duty Air Force, the Air Force Reserve Command and the Air National Guard, would be married together to carry out the assigned deployment rotation.

Shortly thereafter, the unit began planning for a 90-day deployment to Muscat, Oman, to again support U.S. troops enforcing the no-fly zone in Southern Iraq. More than 160 personnel were joined by members of the Ohio Air Guard's 179th Airlift Wing to support Operation Northern Watch. Together, the two units flew 345 sorties during their three-month tasking, delivering 895 tons of cargo and 1,122 passengers to destinations in Qatar, Saudi Arabia and the United Arab Emirates. The mission, which was part of the Air Force's first-ever Aerospace Expeditionary Force, concluded in December 1999.

By April 2000 the 123rd Airlift Wing had received its 10th Air Force Outstanding Unit Award, and global deployments continued to mark the wing's activities.

More than 580 Kentucky Air Guard members deployed overseas from December 2000 to March 2001 as part of Air Expeditionary Forces based in Germany and Southwest Asia. Other unit members were sent to South America to participate in drug interdiction efforts. The largest contingent of Kentucky forces—nearly 470 aircrew, maintenance and support personnel—operated from Ramstein Air Base, Germany, in support of Operation Joint Forge, the multinational peacekeeping mission in Bosnia-Herzegovina. While there, unit members transported approximately 2,500 passengers and 410 tons of cargo to locations like Sarajevo and Tuzla, Bosnia; and Taszar, Hungary.

Other 123rd members deployed to Kuwait, Saudi Arabia, the United Arab Emirates and Turkey in support of Operation Joint Forge, Operation Southern Watch and Operation Northern Watch. The latter two missions are responsible for enforcing no-fly zones imposed upon Iraq following the 1991 Gulf War.

=== Global War on Terrorism ===
After the September 11, 2001, terrorist attacks, unit members were tasked to participate in the war against terrorism and in homeland defense. Currently, more than 500 Kentucky ANG troops have been called to active duty for at least a year while scores of additional troops are serving on short-term duty as needed to support Operation Noble Eagle and Operation Enduring Freedom.

In the first half of 2002, the wing received three major honors recognizing its superior performance in 2001. The awards were the 15th Air Force Solano Trophy, given each year to the top reserve unit in the 15th Air Force; the Metcalf Trophy, given annually to the best tanker or airlift unit in the Air National Guard; and the Air Force Outstanding Unit Award—the wing's 11th such honor.

A member of the wing's 123rd Special Tactics Squadron, MSG Keary Miller (retired) was awarded the Air Force Cross for his actions on 4 March 2002. During a 17-hour battle on an Afghan mountaintop, then TSG Miller, a special tactics pararescueman, against overwhelming odds and a barrage of heavy fire from al-Qaida militants, dashed through deep snow into the line of fire multiple times to assess and care for critically wounded fellow service members. Sergeant Miller was the combat search and rescue lead to recover two fellow special operations members from the top of Takur Ghar. During this mission, Miller is credited with saving the lives of 10 service members, and the recovery of seven others who were killed in action.

The wing also stood up the Air National Guard's first Contingency Response Group—a rapid-reaction "airbase in a box" with all the personnel, training and equipment needed to deploy to a remote site, open up a runway and establish airfield operations so that aid and troops can begin to flow into affected areas after a disaster.

The group was instrumental in responding to the statewide ice storm last year that left nearly 770,000 households without power and water for days. All told, the wing deployed more than 380 Airmen across the Commonwealth to clear roads, distribute food and water and conduct house-to-house "wellness checks" credited with saving two people from death by carbon monoxide poisoning.

The unit was equally engaged back home. When Hurricane Gustav began closing in on the Gulf Coast in August 2008, the 123rd Airlift Wing provided the facilities and support for relief agencies to evacuate more than 1,400 New Orleans residents to Louisville and then repatriate them after the danger had passed.

In 2009, the Wing was awarded its 14th Air Force Outstanding Unit Award for accomplishments from 1 October 2007 to 30 September 2009. During those two years, the wing stepped up to perform numerous critical missions at home and abroad, deploying 759 personnel to 62 locations in 20 countries—many of them in harm's way. For example, about 300 Kentucky Airmen and multiple C-130 aircraft were deployed to Bagram Air Base, Afghanistan, from March through May 2009 to provide key airlift support for U.S. forces engaged with the enemy in Operation Enduring Freedom.

The unit maintained an unprecedented 100 percent mission-capable rate during the deployment, never missing a single scheduled flight due to aircraft maintenance issues while completing more than 1,500 combat sorties that delivered 3,900 tons of cargo and transported 20,000 troops throughout the theater of operations. The wing also deployed more than 120 Airmen and two C-130 aircraft to the Caribbean in support of Operation Coronet Oak, an ongoing U.S. Southern Command mission to provide theater airlift capability for U.S. military and government agencies in Central and South America.

A third major overseas deployment saw more than 200 Kentucky Air Guardsmen and three C-130 aircraft deploy to Ramstein Air Base, Germany, from January through March 2008 and August through September 2009 as part of Operation Joint Enterprise. Kentucky aircrews transported more than 200 tons of cargo and 700 troops to 18 nations across Europe and Africa during their tours.

=== BRAC 2005 ===
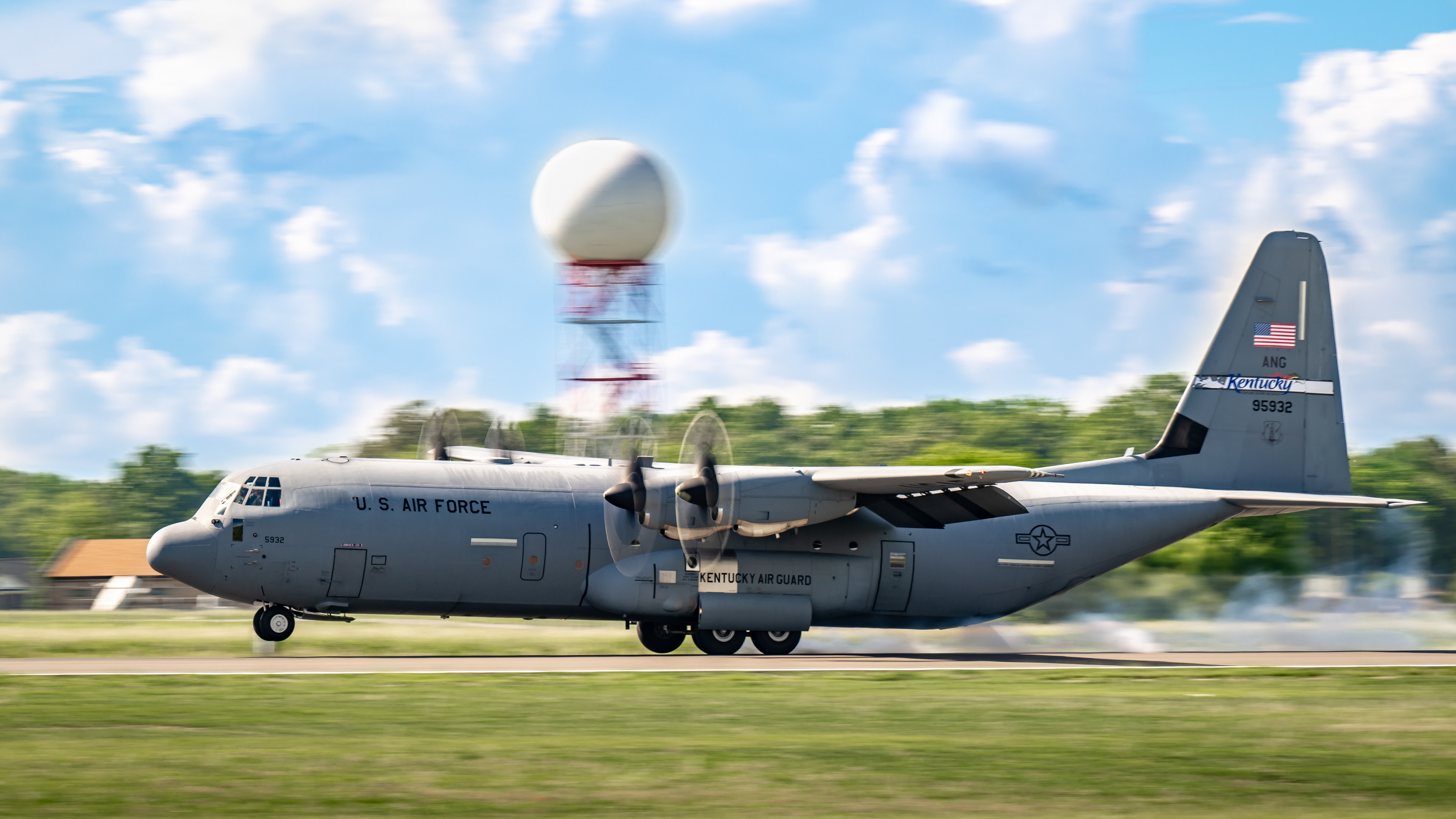
165th Airlift Squadron C-130J Super Hercules lands at Barkley Regional Airport, May 13, 2025

In its BRAC 2005 Recommendations, DoD recommended that Berry Field Air National Guard Base, Nashville, Tennessee, be realigned. This recommendation would distribute the C-130H Hercules aircraft of the 118th Airlift Wing (ANG) to the 123rd Airlift Wing (ANG), Louisville Air National Guard Base at Louisville Airport (four aircraft) and another installation. Military judgment was the predominant factor in this recommendation—this realignment would create one right-sized squadron at Louisville (79) and would retain experienced ANG personnel.

=== C-130J upgrade ===
On 25 November 2020, Kentucky Governor Andy Beshear and the Kentucky congressional delegation jointly announced that the 123rd would soon receive C-130J Hercules aircraft from the United States Air Force to replace the "H" model aircraft that have been in service for over 25 years.

== Lineage ==
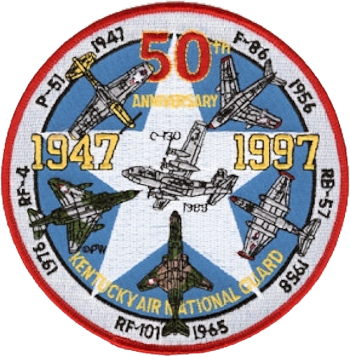
123rd Airlift Wing – 50th Anniversary Emblem

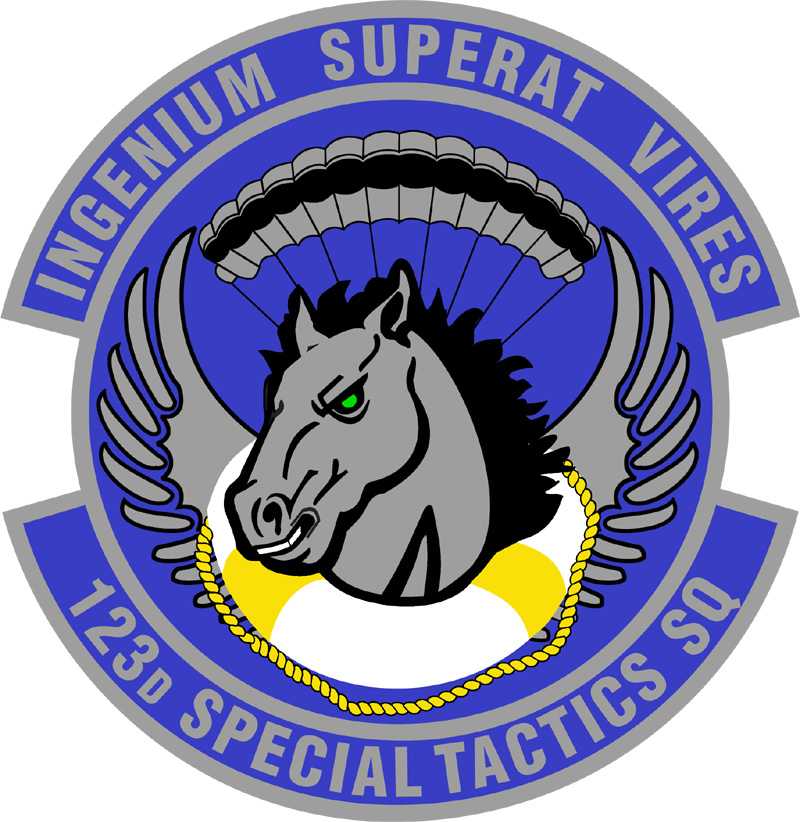
123rd Special Tactics Squadron emblem

- Constituted as the 123rd Fighter-Bomber Wing c. 26 September 1950

Activated on 26 October 1950
Released from active duty and returned to Kentucky state control, 10 July 1952
Redesignated 123rd Fighter-Interceptor Wing and activated on 10 July 1952
Redesignated 123rd Fighter-Bomber Wing on 1 January 1953
Redesignated 123rd Fighter-Interceptor Wing c. 1 July 1955
Redesignated 123rd Tactical Reconnaissance Wing on 1 June 1958
Federalized and ordered to active service on 26 January 1968
Released from active duty and returned to Kentucky state control on 9 June 1969
Redesignated: 123rd Tactical Airlift Wing on 8 January 1989
Redesignated: 123rd Airlift Wing on 16 March 1992

=== Assignments ===
- Ninth Air Force, 26 October 1950
- Third Air Force, 30 November 1951 – 20 July 1952
- Kentucky Air National Guard, 20 July 1952
- Tactical Air Command, 26 January 1968
- Kentucky Air National Guard, 9 June 1969 – present

Gained by: Tactical Air Command, 20 July 1952
Gained by: Military Airlift Command, 8 January 1989
Gained by: Air Mobility Command, 1 June 1992
Gained by: Air Combat Command, 1 October 1993
Gained by: Air Mobility Command, 1 April 1997

=== Components ===
- 123rd Fighter-Bomber Group (later 123rd Fighter-Interceptor Group, 123rd Tactical Reconnaissance Group, 123rd Operations Group0, 26 October 1950 – 20 July 1952, 20 July 1952 – 9 December 1974, 16 March 1992 – present
- 165th Tactical Reconnaissance Squadron (later 165th Tactical Airlift Squadron, 165th Airlift Squadron), 9 December 1974 – 16 March 1992

=== Stations ===
- Godman Air Force Base, Kentucky, 26 October 1950
- RAF Manston, England, 30 November 1951 – 10 July 1952
- Standiford Field, Louisville, Kentucky, 10 July 1952
- Richards-Gebaur Air Force Base, Missouri, 26 January 1968 – 9 June 1969
- Standiford Airport (later Louisville International Airport, Kentucky, 1985 (Note: Known as Louisville Air National Guard Base from 1991 onwards.)

=== Aircraft ===
- F-51D Mustang, 1950–1951; 1952–1956
- F-84E Thunderjet, 1951–1952
- F-86A Sabre, 1956–1957
- RB-57A Canberra, 1957–1965
- RF-101G Voodoo, 1965–1971
- RF-101H Voodoo, 1971–1976
- RF-4C Phantom II, 1976–1989
- C-130B Hercules, 1989–1992
- C-130H Hercules, 1992–2021
- C-130J Super Hercules, 2021–Present

=== Decorations ===
- Air Force Outstanding Unit Award

Awarded: 1970, 1979, 1982, 1983, 1985, 1986, 1989, 1994, 1998, 1999, 2002, 2006, 2008, 2010, 2012, 2015, 2017, 2019, 2021, 2023

- General Carl A. Spaatz Trophy

Top Flying Unit for Air National Guard
Awarded: 1950, 1965, 1981

- Distinguished Flying Unit Plaque

Awarded: 1960, 1980, 1983, 1987, 1993, 1998, 2014, 2017, 2018, 2020

- Curtis N. “Rusty” Metcalf Trophy

Outstanding Airlift or Refueling Unit for Air National Guard
Awarded: 1994, 2002. 2007, 2014, 2020

- Air Force Meritorious Unit Award

Awarded: 2023
