= 50th Infantry Brigade Combat Team =

- Shoulder sleeve insignia
- Active: 1 September 1993–1 March 2008 (50th Inf. Bge.); 1 March 2008–15 June 2017 (50th IBCT)
- Country: United States
- Branch: United States Army
- Type: Infantry
- Size: Brigade
- Nickname: Jersey Blues (Special Designation)

Insignia
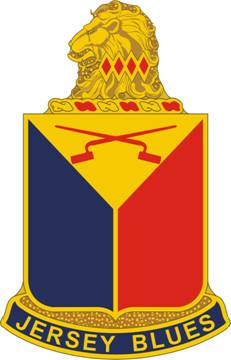
- 50th Infantry Brigade Flag DUI

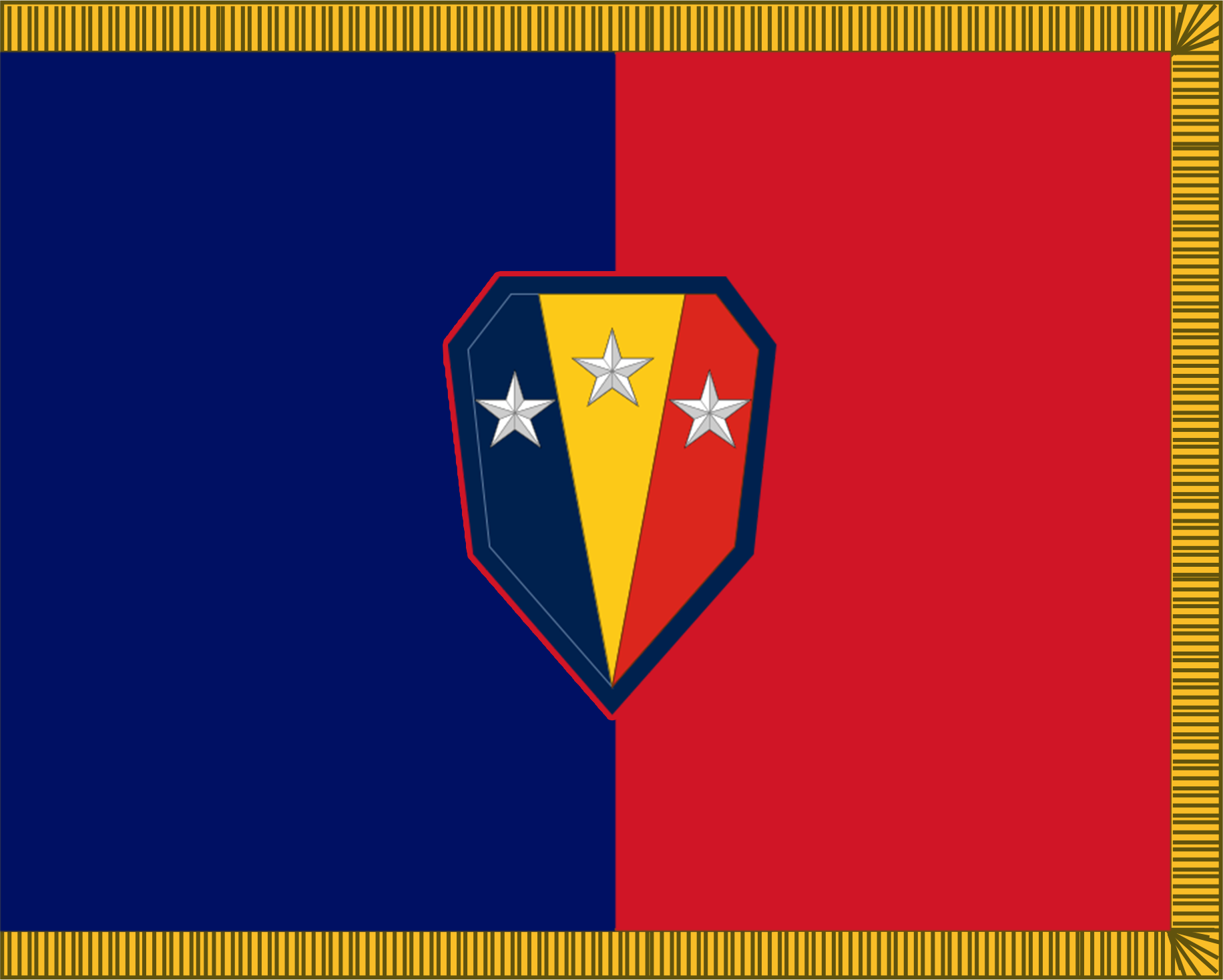
- 50th Infantry Brigade Flag

The 50th Infantry Brigade Combat Team ("Jersey Blues") was an infantry brigade combat team of the United States Army National Guard of New Jersey. It was headquartered at the Lawrenceville Armory.

== Background ==
The 50th Brigade Combat Team was the major unit of the New Jersey Army National Guard. The headquarters was located in Lawrenceville, NJ. The 50th Brigade Combat Team had two light infantry battalions, one field artillery battalion, one cavalry squadron, a special troops battalion, two MP companies, and a support battalion. Its nickname "Jersey Blues" dates back to the 17th century with the earliest units serving in both the French and Indian War (see book titled 'Colonial Tribulations') and Rev. War.

The brigade's lineage can be traced back to several different units starting with the 50th Armored Division. This unit was disbanded on 1 September 1993 and the division was reduced to the 50th Armored Brigade which was subordinate unit to the 42nd Infantry Division. This unit consisted of the 2d Battalion, 102d Armor; the 5th Squadron, 117th Cavalry; the 113th Infantry; the 114th Infantry; the 3d Battalion, 112th Field Artillery; and the 250th Support Battalion. All units of the 50th Brigade were equipped with dated equipment such as M1IP Abrams main battle tanks, M113A1 armored personnel carriers and M109A5 self-propelled guns. The 50th Armored Brigade existed up until 2007–2008 when the brigade was upgraded and converted to a brigade combat team under the Army's new modularity program.

The 50th Armored Brigade took part in several homeland security missions after 11 September 2001. It also participated in several Global War on Terror missions before converting in 2008. The 1st Battalion, 114th Infantry took part in the Sinai Multi-National Force and Observers (MFO) Security Mission and was deployed for six months in 2004. The 2d Battalion, 102d Armor and the 2d Battalion, 113th Infantry deployed to Guantanamo Bay Cuba and served with the Joint Detention Operations Group as part of JTF-JDOG V. Battery B, 3d Battalion, 112th Field Artillery (augmented by soldiers from the 5th Squadron, 117th Cavalry) deployed to Iraq in support of Operation Iraqi Freedom II as an "In Lieu Of" Military Police Company. Batteries A and C deployed to Germany in 2004 as provisional Military Police companies. In October 2005 elements of the brigade were activated for Operation Hurricane Katrina relief in the city of New Orleans. The 2d Battalion, 102d Armor and the 1st Battalion, 114th Infantry were called to active duty and the combined unit shipped to Louisiana to provide security for FEMA. The brigade arrived at Belle Chase Naval Air Station and from there was forward deployed to the New Orleans Convention Center. From there the elements of the 42nd Infantry Division sent teams to various parts of the city on various missions of security ranging from roving patrol to security escort for the New Orleans Fire Department and various other relief agencies. In 2006, and again in 2007, the brigade sent composite teams from across its component units as embedded trainers and advisors for the Afghan National Army.

The force structure of the Brigade was changed in 2008 when the conversion to the 50th IBCT occurred. The new force structure consisted of 1st Squadron, 102nd Cavalry Regiment, 1st Battalion (Light), 114th Infantry Regiment, 2nd Battalion (Light), 113th Infantry Regiment, 3rd Battalion, 112th Field Artillery Regiment, the Special Troops Battalion and the 250th Brigade Support Battalion. Equipment was mostly brought up to current Army standards and all armor assets were relinquished.

In June 2008, 26 company-sized elements of the 50th IBCT were mobilized and trained at Fort Bliss, Texas, before being separately deployed to Iraq for the 2008–2009 rotation of Operation Iraqi Freedom (OIF). The deployment of these 50th IBCT, under the command of Colonel Steven Ferrari elements brought the total number of NJ National Guard Soldiers sent to Iraq and Afghanistan to over 3,200. The 50th IBCT units were mobilized for one year, including stateside training and "boots on the ground" in theater. The 50th IBCT units conducted a variety of important missions in Iraq. Pre-mobilization training began in 2007 and took place in New Jersey and Fort Indian Town Gap, Pennsylvania, with further OIF-specific preparations conducted at Fort Bliss, TX. Originally slated to deploy to Iraq in 2010, the 50th IBCT units deployed earlier to compensate for the changes needed to comply with new Department of Defense (DoD) policies. Earlier in 2007, the DoD had reduced the amount of time units spend overseas in a combat theater, which in turn shifted mobilization schedules and required earlier deployments than anticipated. The units of the 50th Infantry Brigade Combat Team were welcomed home by family and friends with a parade through Trenton, NJ on 12 June 2009, after almost a year-long tour of Iraq. The brigade units, led by their commander, Colonel Steve Ferrari, were welcomed by Governor Jon Corzine.

The force structure of the Brigade was changed again in 2015, in accordance with the Army's latest Modified Table of Organization and Equipment (MTOE) for IBCTs. The new force structure consisted of a third infantry battalion, the 1st Battalion, 181st Infantry Regiment headquartered in Worcester, Massachusetts. Additionally, the 50th Brigade Special Troops Battalion was converted to a Brigade Engineer Battalion (BEB), designated as the 104th BEB.

On 15 June 2017, the 50th IBCT was reflagged as the 44th IBCT.

== Structure ==
  - 1st Squadron, 102nd Cavalry Regiment
  - 2nd Battalion, 113th Infantry Regiment
  - 1st Battalion, 114th Infantry Regiment
  - 1st Battalion, 181st Infantry Regiment
  - 3rd Battalion, 112th Field Artillery Regiment (3-112th FAR)
  - 104th Brigade Engineer Battalion (104th BEB)
  - 250th Brigade Support Battalion (250th BSB)

== Campaign participation credit ==
=== World War I ===
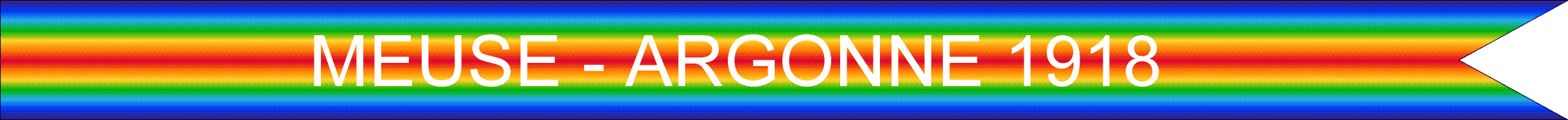
- Meuse-Argonne
- Alsace 1918

=== World War II ===
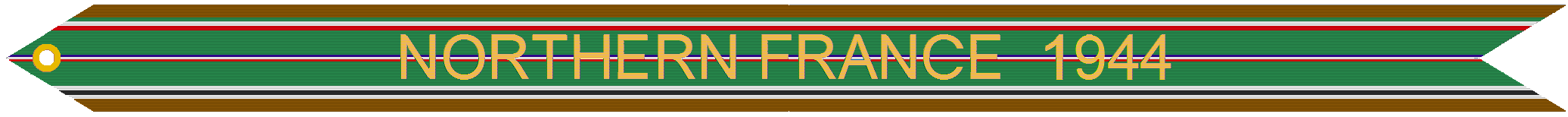
- Northern France
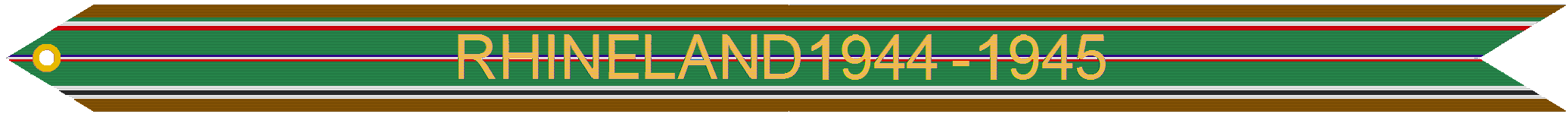
- The Rhineland
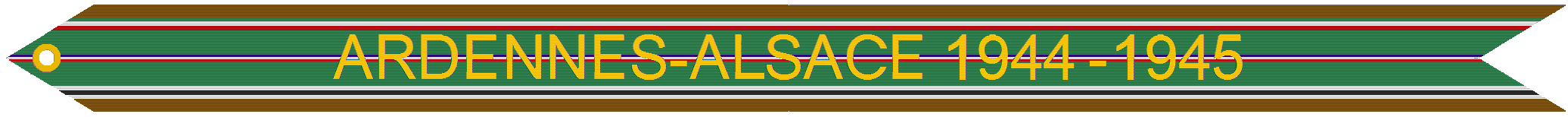
- Ardennes-Alsace
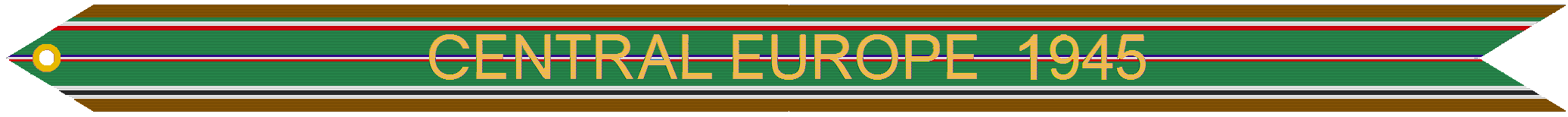
- Central Europe

=== War on Terrorism ===
- Phase 5: Iraqi Surge
- Phase 6: Iraqi Sovereignty

== Decorations ==
- Joint Meritorious Unit Award
  - Guantanamo (2004–2005)
  - Iraq (2008–2009)
- Meritorious Unit Commendation
  - Southwest Asia (2014–2015)
