= 114th Infantry Regiment (United States) =

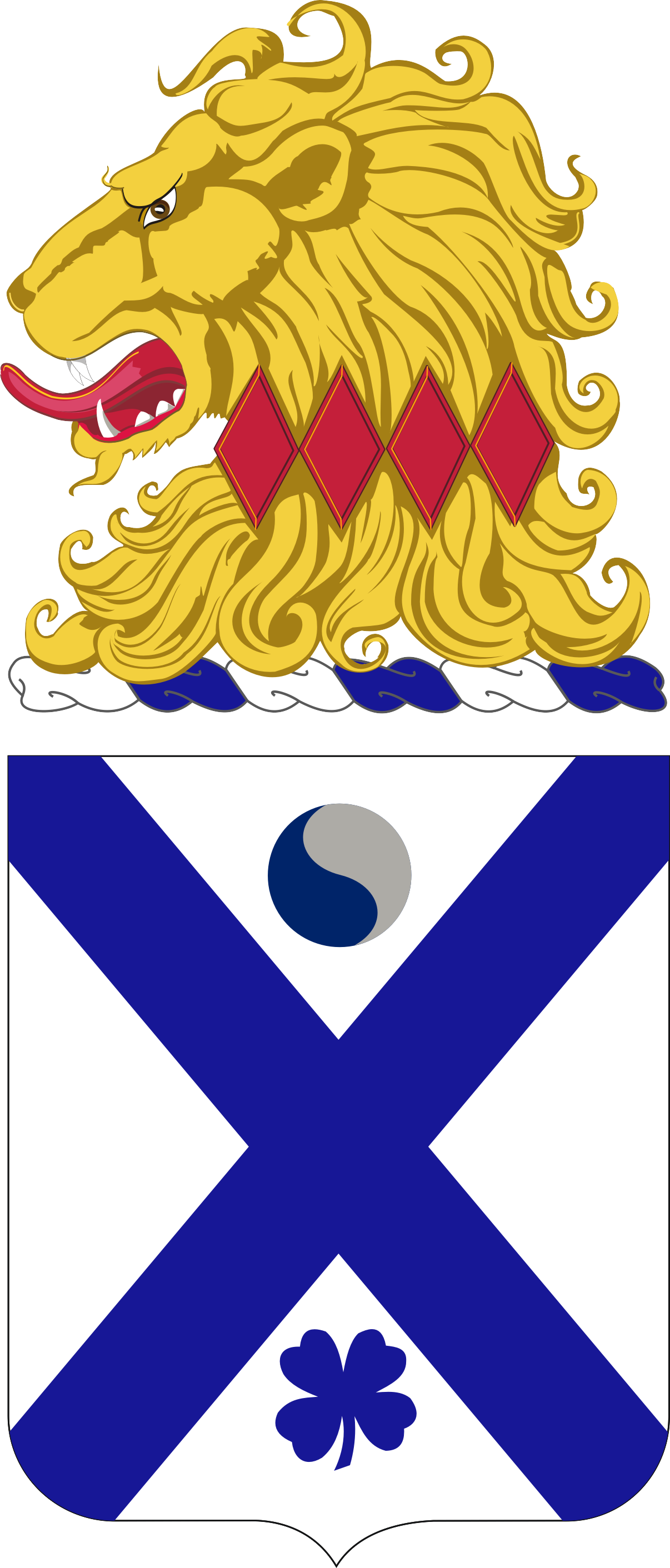
- Coat of arms
- Active: 1869
- Country: United States
- Branch: New Jersey Army National Guard
- Type: Infantry
- Size: Regiment
- Part of: 44th Infantry Brigade Combat Team, NJ ARNG
- Motto: In Omnia Paratus (In All Things Prepared)

Commanders
- Notable commanders: Manton S. Eddy

The 114th Infantry Regiment is an Infantry regiment of the New Jersey Army National Guard.

== Lineage ==
=== Post-Civil War ===
What would become the 114th Infantry was first constituted on 9 March 1869 in the New Jersey National Guard as the 5th Battalion, and it was partially organized on 14 April 1869 from existing units at Burlington and Camden. It was expanded, reorganized, and redesignated 24 August 1870 as the 6th Regiment.

=== Spanish-American War ===
Companies A, C, and G were mustered into federal service from 11–13 May 1898 at Sea Girt as Companies K, L, and M, 3rd New Jersey Volunteer Infantry, and were mustered out of federal service on 11 February 1899 at Athens, Georgia. The units' parent regiment was reorganized and redesignated on 2 May 1899 in the New Jersey National Guard as the 3rd Infantry.

=== World War I ===
The 3rd Infantry was mustered into federal service on 25 July 1917 at Sea Girt, and drafted into federal service on 5 August 1917. On 11 October 1917, the regimental headquarters, Headquarters Company (less Band), Supply Company, 1st and 2nd Battalions, and Companies K and M were consolidated with elements of the 5th Infantry, New Jersey National Guard, and elements of the 1st Infantry, Delaware National Guard, to form the 114th Infantry Regiment, which was assigned to the 29th Division. The Delaware elements were withdrawn in January 1918, and maintain a separate lineage.

=== Interwar period ===
The 114th Infantry arrived at the port of New York on 6 May 1919 on the troopship USS Madawaska and was demobilized on 14 May 1919 at Camp Dix, New Jersey. Per the National Defense Act of 1920, the 114th Infantry was reconstituted in the National Guard in 1921, allotted to the state of New Jersey, and concurrently relieved from the 29th Division. The former 1st Battalion, 3rd Infantry, was reorganized in 1919 in the New Jersey National Guard as the 1st Battalion, 6th Infantry, and hereafter maintained a separate lineage, while the former 3rd Infantry (less the 1st Battalion) was reorganized in 1920 in the New Jersey National Guard, with the regimental headquarters federally recognized on 23 December 1920 at Camden. The regiment was redesignated on 17 June 1921 as the 114th Infantry and assigned to the 44th Division. The regimental headquarters was relocated in 1922 to Camden. The 114th Infantry conducted annual summer training most years at Sea Girt, from 1921–38. It was inducted into active federal service on 16 September 1940 and moved to Fort Dix, where it arrived on 23 May 1940.

=== Cold War ===
The 114th Infantry was inactivated on 16 November 1945 at Camp Chaffee, Arkansas. It was relieved on 9 July 1946 from assignment to the 44th Infantry Division. The regiment, less the 3rd Battalion, was reorganized and federally recognized on 8 October 1946 as the 214th Infantry with headquarters at Paterson; the 3rd Battalion, 114th Infantry, was reorganized and federally recognized on 17 February 1947 as the 114th Armored Infantry Battalion, with headquarters at Woodbury, and assigned to the 50th Armored Division. The location of headquarters, 214th Infantry, was changed on 1 February 1947 to Newark. The 216th Infantry was reorganized and redesignated on 15 May 1949 as the 216th Armored Infantry Battalion and assigned to the 50th Armored Division. The 114th and 216th Armored Infantry Battalions were consolidated on 1 March 1959 and the consolidated unit was reorganized and redesignated as the 114th Infantry, a parent regiment under the Combat Arms Regimental System, to consist of the 1st and 2nd Armored Infantry Battalions, elements of the 50th Armored Division. On 31 January 1963, the regiment was reorganized to consist of the 1st and 2nd Battalions, elements of the 50th Armored Division, on 1 February 1968 to consist of the 1st Battalion, and on 1 July 1975 to consist of the 1st and 2nd Battalions. On 1 May 1989, the regiment was withdrawn from the Combat Arms Regimental System and reorganized under the United States Army Regimental System. It was reorganized on 1 September 1991 to consist of the 1st Battalion, an element of the 50th Armored Division.

=== Modern ===
On 1 September 1993, the 1st Battalion, 114th Infantry, was reassigned to the 42nd Infantry Division after the inactivation of the 50th Armored Division caused its brigades to be realigned to other divisions. The battalion was redesignated on 1 October 2015 as the 1-114th Infantry Battalion (Air Assault), 50th Infantry Brigade Combat Team, part of the 42nd Infantry Division. The 1-114th is now part of the 44th Infantry Brigade Combat Team.

== Commanders ==
- 2014 – 2017 LTC Frederick Pasquale
- 2017 – 2020 LTC Kevin H. Welsh
- 2020 – 2021 LTC John T Boyd
- 2021 – 2022 LTC Timothy P Sorrentino

Note: Highest Rank Attained by Commander Listed

== Command Sergeants Major ==
- 2014 – 2016 CSM Thomas J. Clark
- 2016 – 2017 CSM Michael Colbert
- 2017 – 2018 CSM William Stuart
- 2018 – 2020 CSM Paul Horan
- 2020 – 2021 CSM Jack K Niemynski
- 2021 – 2022 CSM John Rospond
- 2022 – 2023 CSM William Collier
- 2023 - Current CSM Donald Chapman Jr.

== Campaign participation ==
=== Civil War ===
Headquarters Company (Woodbury), 1st Battalion, additionally entitled to:

- Peninsula

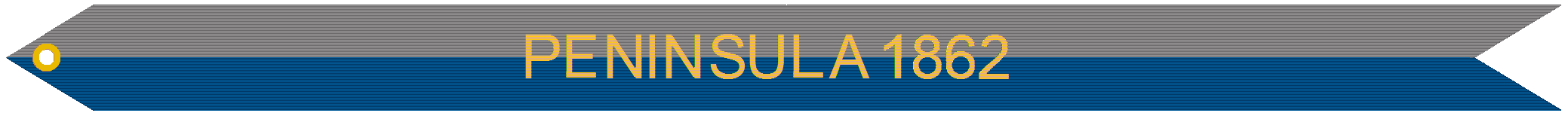

- Manassas
- Fredericksburg

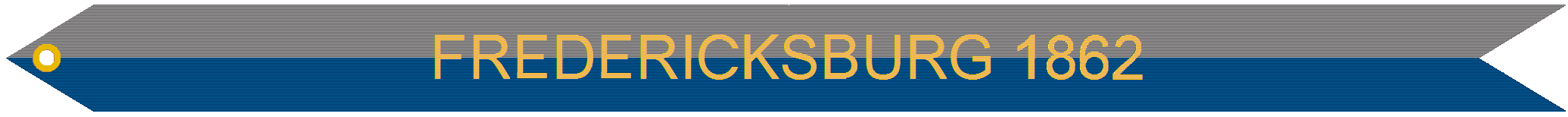

- Chancellorsville

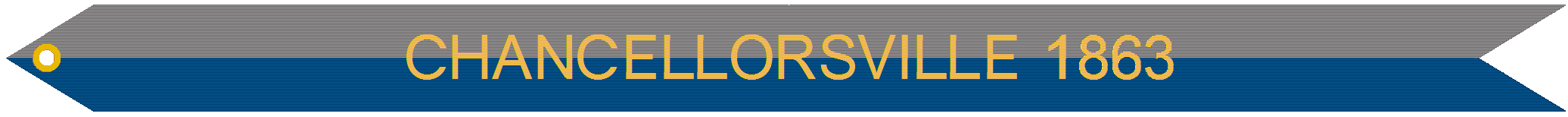

- Gettysburg

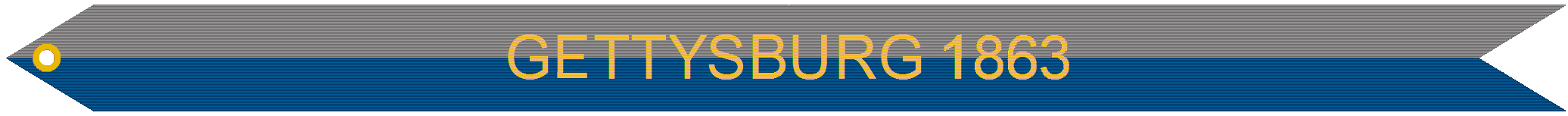

- Wilderness
- Spotsylvania
- Cold Harbor

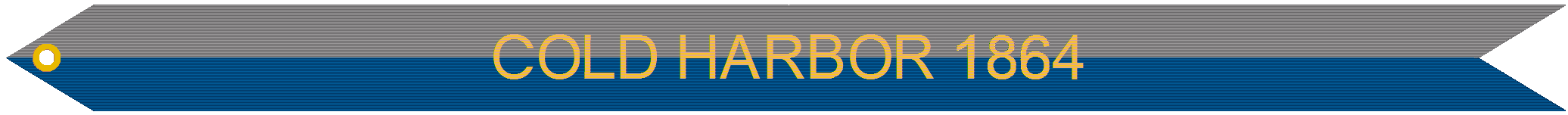

- Petersburg

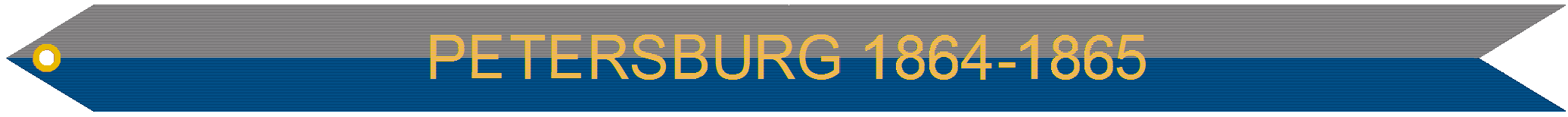

- Appomattox

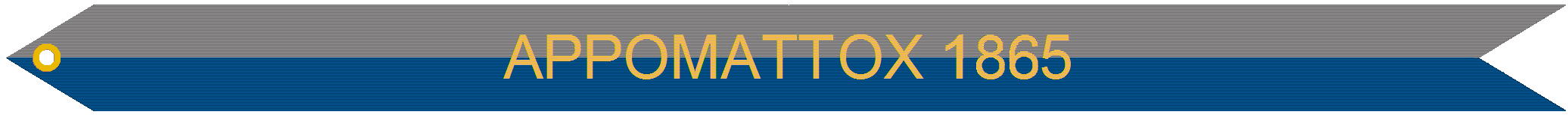

- Virginia 1864

=== World War I ===
- Meuse-Argonne

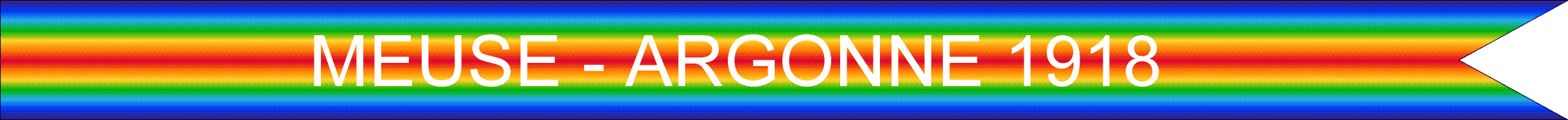

- Alsace 1918

=== World War II ===
- Northern France

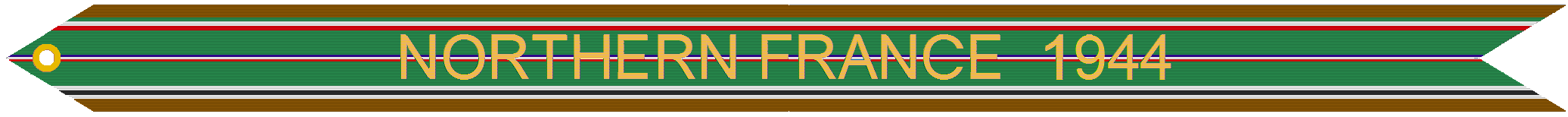

- Rhineland

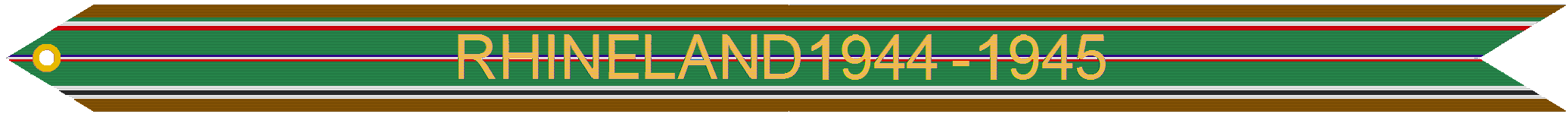

- Ardennes-Alsace

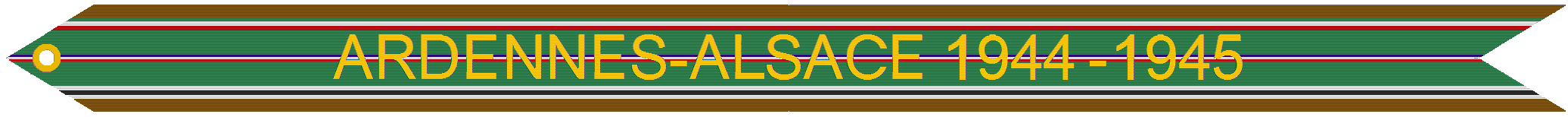

- Central Europe

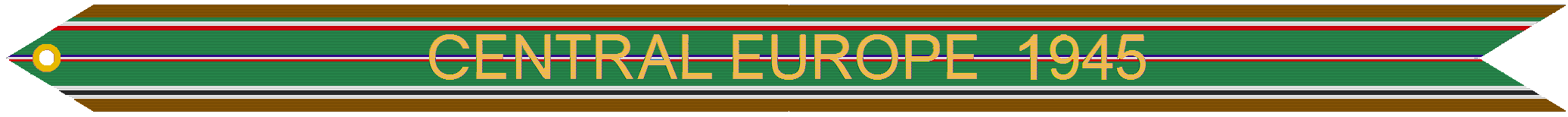

=== World War II -- EAME ===
Company B (Freehold) and Company D (Freehold), 1st Battalion, each additionally entitled to:

- Normandy

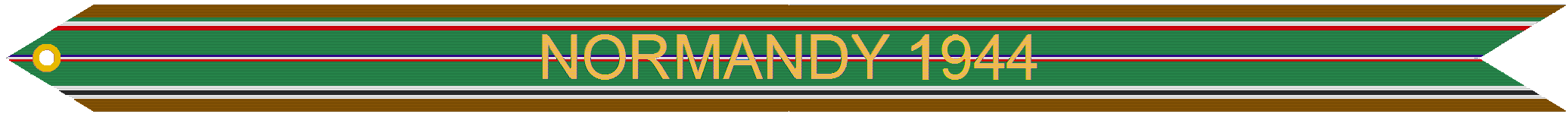

=== War on Terrorism ===
- Phase 5: Iraqi Surge
- Phase 6: Iraqi Sovereignty

== Decorations ==
Company B (Freehold) and Company D (Woodstown), 1st Battalion, each entitled to:

- Presidential Unit Citation (Army), Streamer embroidered Hurtgen Forest
- Belgian Fourragere 1940
  - Cited in the Order of the Day of the Belgian Army for action at Elsenborn Crest.
  - Cited in the Order of the Day of the Belgian Army for action in the Ardennes.
- Joint Meritorious Unit Award
  - Iraq (2008–2009)

== Distinctive unit insignia ==
- Description

Description/Blazon A Gold color metal and enamel device 1 1/8 inches (2.86 cm) in height overall consisting of a shield blazoned: Argent, a saltire Azure, in chief a Taeguk of the last (Azure) and gray (the shoulder sleeve insignia of the 29th Division) and in base a four-leafed clover of the second (Azure) (the badge of the 3rd Division of the 2nd Corps, 1898). Attached above the shield from a wreath Argent and Azure a lion's head erased Or collared four fusils Gules. Attached below and to the sides of the shield a Gold scroll inscribed "IN OMNIA PARATUS" in Blue letters.

- Symbolism

The shield is white, the old Infantry color. The blue saltire cross represents service in the Civil War, the blue four-leafed clover in the Spanish–American War and the blue and gray Taeguk in World War I. The motto is the motto of the old 3rd New Jersey Infantry and translates to "Prepared in All Things."

- Background

The distinctive unit insignia was originally approved for the 114th Infantry Regiment on 29 May 1925. It was amended to correct the wording in the description of the shield on 11 June 1925. The insignia was amended to include the crest on 3 July 1961.

== Coat of arms ==
=== Blazon ===
- Shield
- Crest

=== Symbolism ===
- Shield

The shield is blue for the Infantry; the white saltire cross commemorates the service of the old regiment in the Civil War and the silver oak tree the service in World War I (Argonne Forest).

- Crest

The crest is that of the New Jersey Army National Guard.
