= Steven Ferrari =

US Army major general

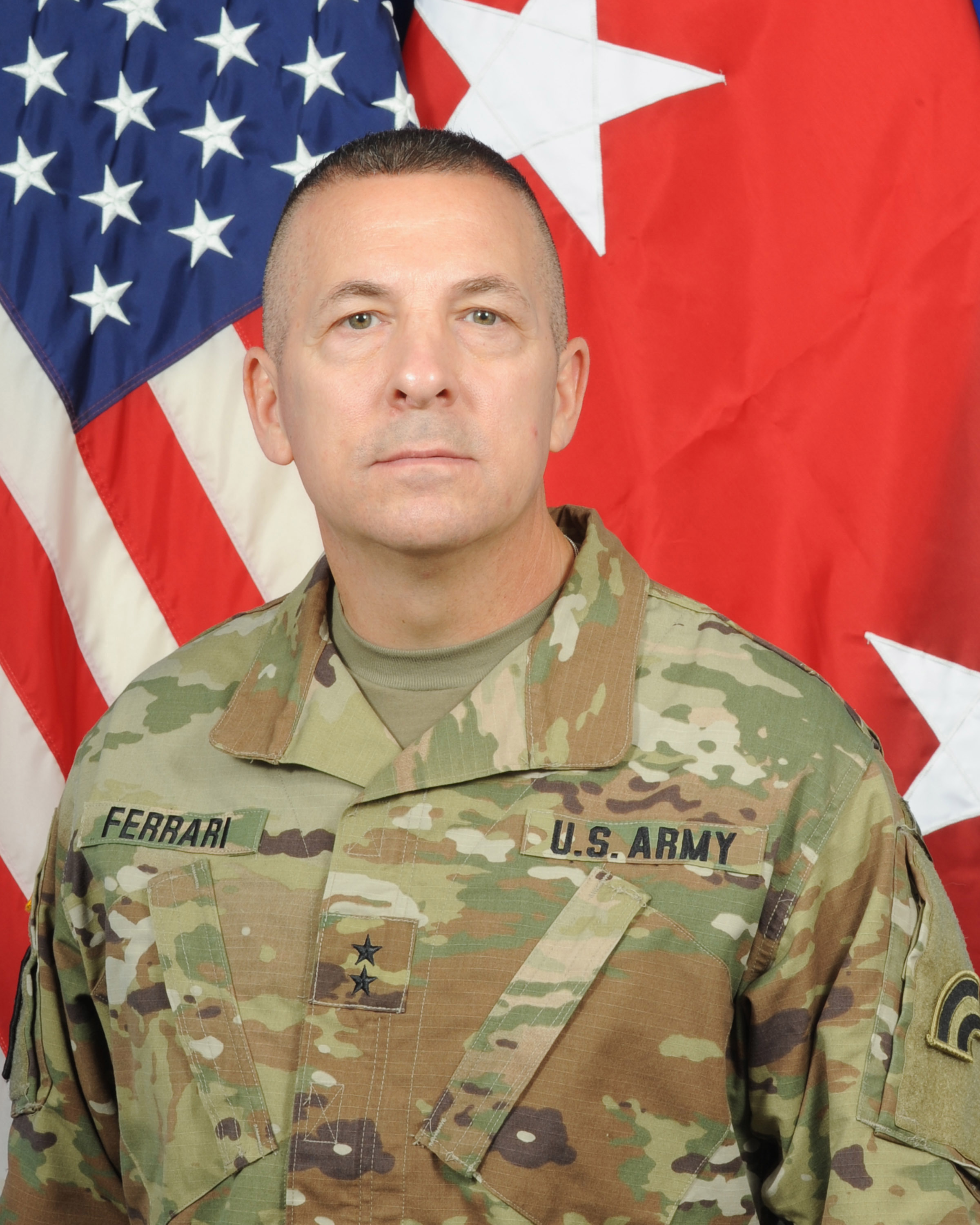
- Ferrari as commander of the 42nd Infantry Division in 2017
- Born: January 25, 1962 (age 64); Camden, New Jersey, US
- Education: University of Phoenix; United States Army Command and General Staff College; United States Army War College
- Spouse(s): Kimberly C. Konopka (m. 1986); Tracy Kashulines
- Children: 2
- Military career
- Service: United States Army
- Service years: 1981–2021
- Rank: Major General
- Units: New Jersey Army National Guard; New York Army National Guard
- Commands: Task Force Spartan; 42nd Infantry Division; 50th Infantry Brigade Combat Team; Joint Area Support Group – Central, Multi-National Force – Iraq; 3rd Battalion, 112th Field Artillery Regiment; Battery B, 1st Battalion, 112th Field Artillery
- Conflicts: Iraq War; Operation Spartan Shield
- Awards: Army Distinguished Service Medal; Legion of Merit (3); Bronze Star Medal
- Other work: Superintendent, Veterans Haven, New Jersey Department of Military and Veterans Affairs

Steven Ferrari (born January 25, 1962) is a career US Army officer who retired as a major general. A native of Camden, New Jersey and longtime member of the New Jersey Army National Guard, he served from 1981 to 2021. Ferrari is a veteran of the Iraq War and Operation Spartan Shield, and his assignments included command of Joint Area Support Group – Central, Multi-National Force – Iraq, the 50th Infantry Brigade Combat Team, the 42nd Infantry Division, and Task Force Spartan. His awards and decorations included the Army Distinguished Service Medal, three awards of the Legion of Merit, and the Bronze Star Medal.

== Early life ==
Steven Ferrari was born in Camden, New Jersey on January 25, 1962, a son of Colonel Mario J. Ferrari and Barbara Jean (Bensinger) Ferrari. Mario Ferrari was a World War II veteran and longtime member of the United States Army Reserve and a career law enforcement officer with the Camden Police Department. Ferrari was raised and educated in the Camden area, including Stratford, and is a 1980 graduate of Somerdale's Sterling High School, where he played baseball and football. In 1986, Ferrari married Kimberly C. Konopka, with whom he is the father of two sons, Steven and Nicholas. He later married Tracy Kashulines, and is the stepfather of her children Will and Malyssa.

Ferrari became a full-time member of the New Jersey Army National Guard in June 1986 and continued as a full-time member until August 2011. Ferrari's later civilian career included work in the Information Technology field for companies including General Dynamics. While residing in Winslow Township, he served as superintendent of Veterans Haven, a transition facility for homeless veterans in Winslow that is operated by the New Jersey Department of Military and Veterans Affairs.

== Start of military career ==
In January 1981, Ferrari enlisted in the New Jersey Army National Guard. Assigned as a Field Artillery fire direction specialist at Headquarters and Headquarters Battery, 1st Battalion, 112th Field Artillery Regiment, he completed basic training and advanced individual training at Fort Sill, Oklahoma in July 1981. He then attended Officer Candidate School at Fort Benning, Georgia, and he received his commission as a second lieutenant of Field Artillery in March 1982.

Ferrari's initial assignments were with 1-112th Field Artillery, including: fire support team chief, Headquarters and Headquarters Battalion (March 1982–January 1983); fire direction officer, Battery C (February–September 1983); executive officer, Battery C (September 1983–August 1986); reconnaissance and survey officer, Headquarters and Headquarters Battalion (August 1986–October 1987); intelligence staff officer (S-2), Headquarters and Headquarters Battalion (October 1987–January 1989); and commander of Battery B (January 1989–August 1990). He was promoted to first lieutenant in March 1985 and captain in March 1988. In addition, he continued his professional military education with completion of the Field Artillery Officer Basic Course and Field Artillery Officer Advanced Course.

== Continued military career ==
Ferrari's continued assignments included: battalion fire direction officer, Headquarters and Headquarters Battalion, 1st Battalion, 112th Field Artillery (August 1990–July 1994); battalion plans operations, and training officer (S-3), Headquarters and Headquarters Battalion, 1st Battalion, 112th Field Artillery (August 1994–May 1995); battalion executive officer, Headquarters and Headquarters Battalion, 1st Battalion, 112th Field Artillery (June 1995–July 1997); and director of operations, New Jersey Army National Guard Training and Training Technology Battle Lab, (August 1997–July 1999). He was promoted to major in August 1994.

From August 1999 to March 2002, Ferrari served as executive officer, of the Training and Training Technology Battle Lab. He was assigned as assistant plans, operations, and training officer (G3) at the New Jersey Army National Guard's Fort Dix headquarters from March to April 2002. From May 2002 to February 2004, Ferrari commanded 3rd Battalion, 112th Field Artillery. He was assigned as assistant chief of staff at the New Jersey National Guard's Joint Force Headquarters from March 2004 to January 2006. In 2000, Ferrari graduated from the University of Phoenix with a Bachelor of Science degree in information systems. He also continued his professional military education with graduation from the United States Army Command and General Staff College. Ferrari was promoted to lieutenant colonel in April 2001.

== Later military career ==
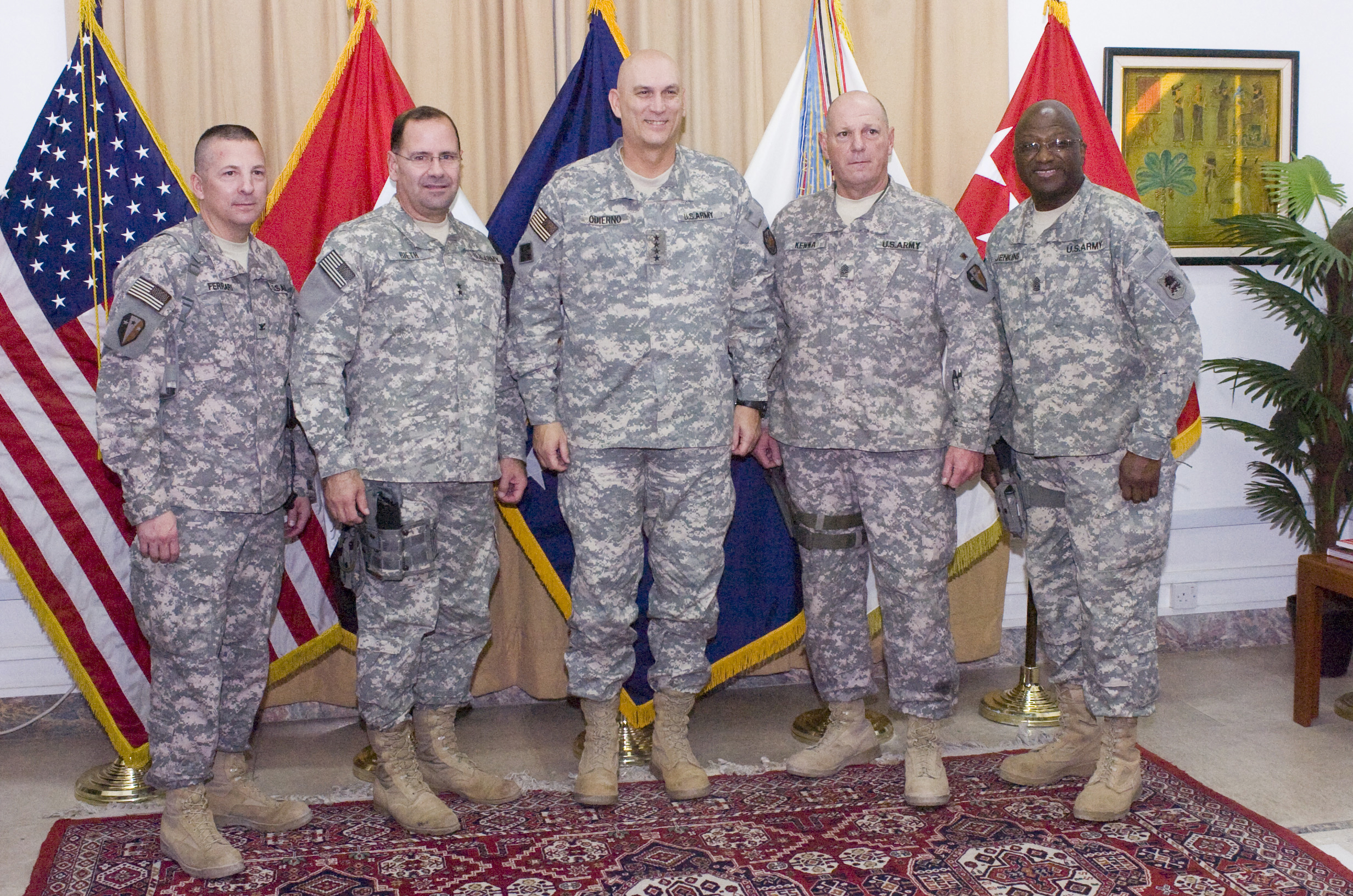
Glenn Reith, the New Jersey adjutant general, visits New Jersey troops in Iraq in 2008. Ferrari is at far left.

From January 2006 to May 2006 Ferrari was assigned as director of military support at the New Jersey National Guard's Joint Force Headquarters. He was a strategic planner at JFHQ from May to September 2006. From October 2006 to September 2007, he served staff director at the New Jersey National Guard's Joint Force Headquarters. In 2007, He graduated from the United States Army War College with a Master of Strategic Studies degree. From October 2007 to January 2008, Ferrari served as deputy commander of the 50th Infantry Brigade Combat Team. He was a resident of Berlin Township when he served as the brigade's commander from February to June 2008.

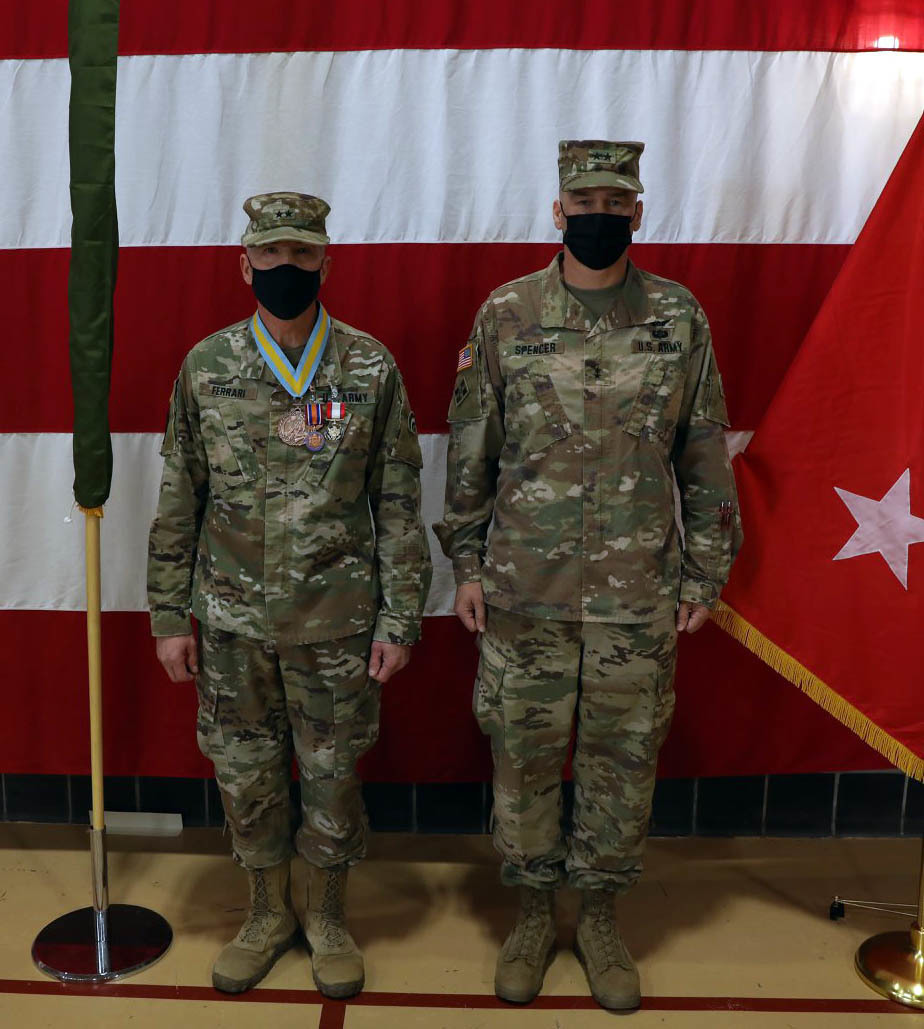
Ferrari and Thomas Spencer at 42nd ID change of command, 17 April 2021. At the ceremony, Ferrari received the Army Distinguished Service Medal, New York State Conspicuous Service Medal, and National Infantry Association's Order of Saint Maurice.

Ferrari commanded Joint Area Support Group - Central, part of Multi-National Force – Iraq from June 2008 to June 2009. After returning to New Jersey, from June 2009 to December 2009, he again commanded the 50th Infantry Brigade Combat Team. From January 2020 to August 2011, he served as the New Jersey Army National Guard's chief of staff. As a senior officer, he continued his professional education with courses including the Army Senior Leader Development Program- Intermediate (ASLDP-I), Army Senior Leader Development Program-Basic (ASLDP-B), and Equal Opportunity (EO) Advisor Reserve Components Course.

From September 2011 to December 2015, Ferrari was assigned as the 42nd Infantry Division's assistant division commander for support. From December 2015 to February 2017, he served as the New Jersey National Guard's assistant adjutant general for army and deputy adjutant general. Professional education he completed as a general officer included the Dual Status Commanders Course, Joint Task Force Commanders Course, Army Strategic Education Program - Command (ASEP-C), Combined/Joint Forces Land Component Commander Course (C/JFLCC), and Joint Flag Officer Warfighting Course (JFOWC).

In March 2017, Ferrari was assigned as commander of the 42nd Infantry Division, succeeding Harry E. Miller Jr. In March 2020, the 42nd Division headquarters assumed responsibility for the Task Force Spartan, the army's contingent assigned to Operation Spartan Shield in Kuwait. Ferrari commanded the task force until November 2020. After returning to the United States, he continued to command the division until January 2021, when he retired and was succeeded by Thomas F. Spencer.

== Awards ==
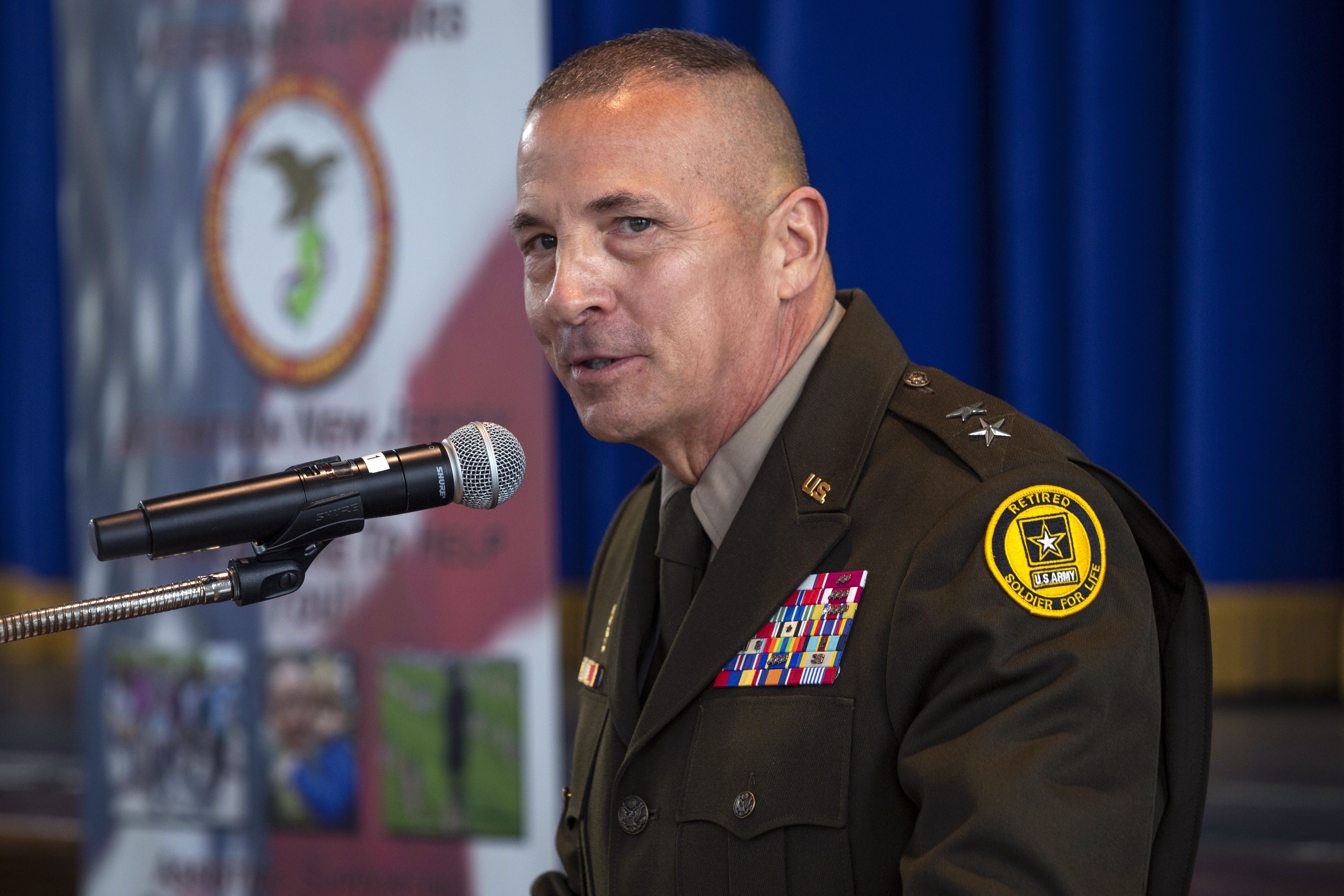
Ferrari presenting medals to veterans at ceremony in October 2021

Ferrari's awards included:

- Army Distinguished Service Medal
- Legion of Merit (with 2 bronze oak leaf clusters)
- Bronze Star Medal
- Meritorious Service Medal (with 3 bronze oak leaf clusters)
- Army Commendation Medal (with 4 bronze oak leaf clusters)
- Army Achievement Medal
- Joint Meritorious Unit Award
- Army Reserve Components Achievement Medal (with 1 silver oak leaf cluster and 3 bronze oak leaf clusters)
- National Defense Service Medal (with 1 bronze service star)
- Iraqi Campaign Medal (with 1 bronze service star)
- Global War on Terrorism Service Medal
- Armed Forces Reserve Medal (with gold hourglass, M device, and numeral 2)
- Army Service Ribbon
- Overseas Service Ribbon with numeral 2
- New Jersey Distinguished Service Medal
- New Jersey Ribbon of Honor (with 3 bronze oak leaf clusters)
- New Jersey Merit Award
- New Jersey Desert Storm Ribbon
- New Jersey State Service Award (with 1 bronze oak leaf cluster)
- New York Conspicuous Service Medal
- New York Meritorious Service Medal
- New Jersey Governors Unit Award

== Effective dates of promotion ==
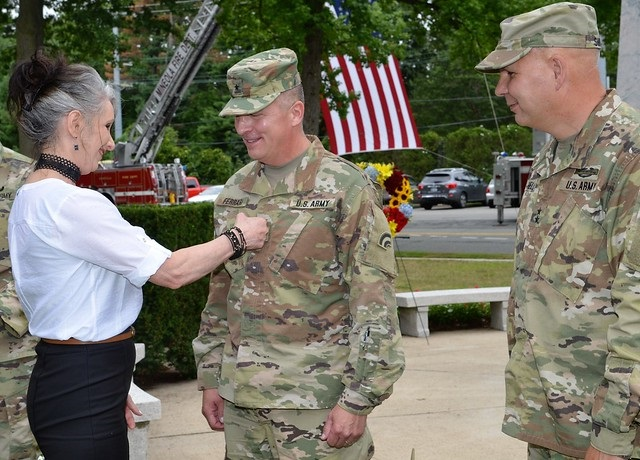
Ferrari's major general's rank presented by his wife in August 2017

Ferrari's effective dates of promotion were:

- Major General, 20 June 2017
- Brigadier General, 29 May 2012
- Colonel, 15 April 2006
- Lieutenant Colonel, 16 April 2001
- Major, 11 August 1994
- Captain, 7 March 1988
- First Lieutenant, 10 March 1985
- Second Lieutenant, 11 March 1982
