= 44th Infantry Brigade Combat Team =

New Jersey National Guard formation

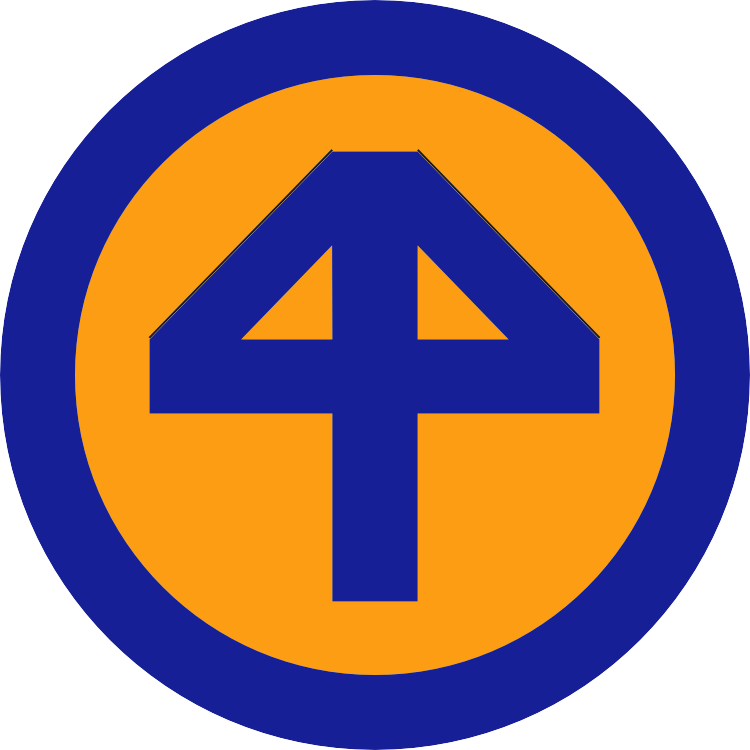
- Shoulder sleeve insignia
- Active: 15 June 2017–present
- Country: United States
- Allegiance: New Jersey Army National Guard
- Branch: United States Army National Guard
- Type: Infantry
- Role: Light Infantry
- Size: Brigade
- Part of: 42nd Infantry Division (United States)
- HQ: Lawrenceville, NJ
- Nickname: Jersey Blues (Special Designation)
- Mottos: "In Omnia Paratus", Prepared in All Things
- Colors: The colors are flag blue and golden orange. These were the colors of the House of Nassau under which the Dutch settled what is now New York and New Jersey. These colors were chosen because the IBCT was formed from units located in this area. The two back to back "4s" represent the unit's numerical designation.
- Website: https://www.nj.gov/military/guard/army/major-commands/44ibct/

Commanders
- Current commander: COL Brian Stramaglia

Insignia
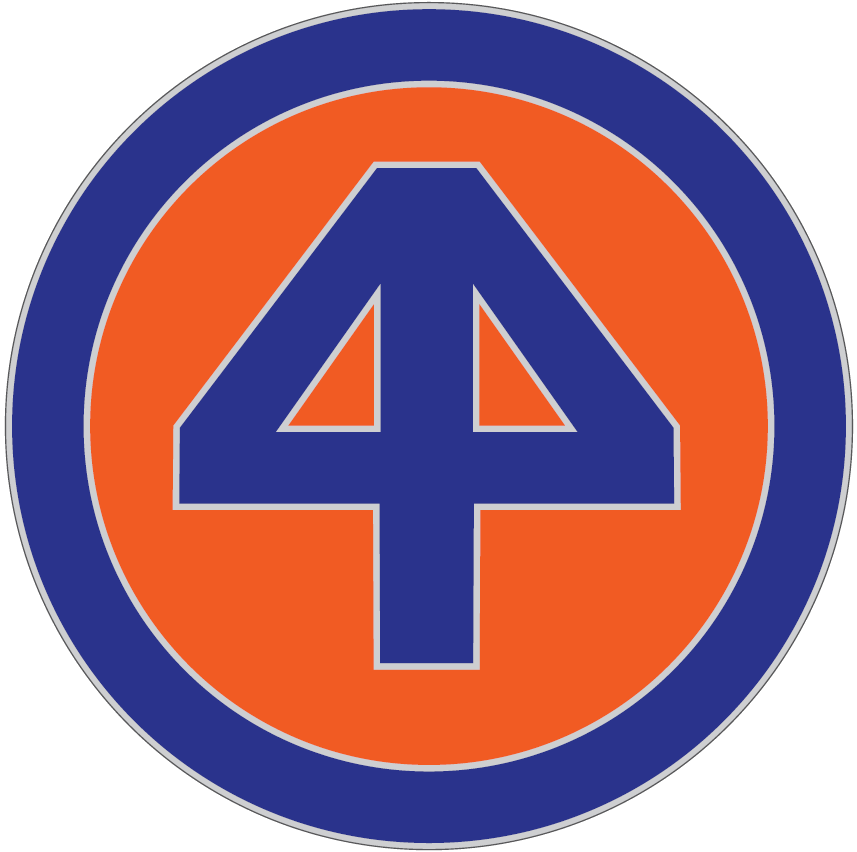
- Combat service identification badge

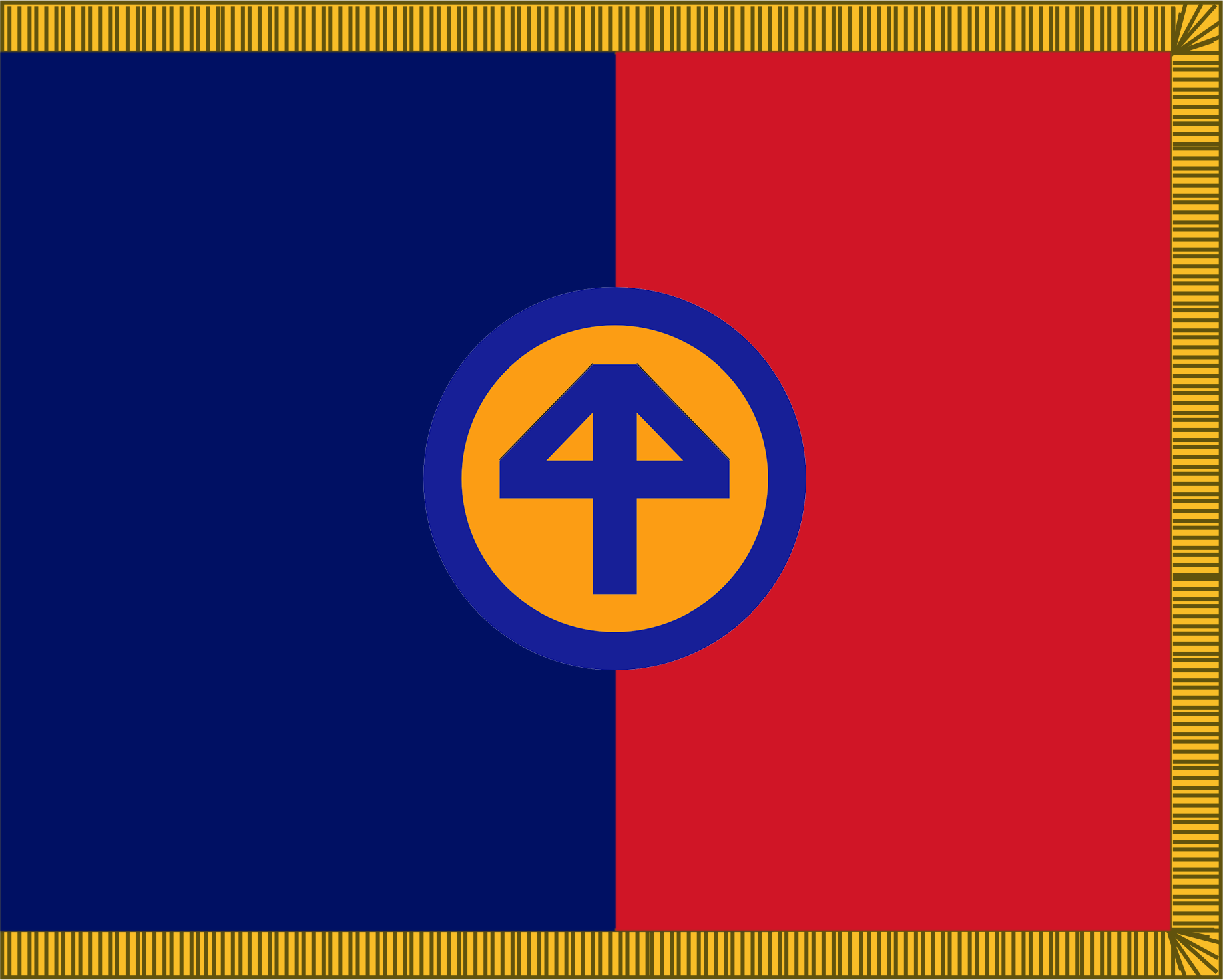
- 44th Infantry Brigade Flag.png

The 44th Infantry Brigade Combat Team is an infantry brigade combat team of the New Jersey National Guard. It is headquartered at the Lawrenceville Armory in Lawrenceville, New Jersey, United States. The 44th Infantry Brigade Combat Team is the major unit of the New Jersey Army National Guard. It consists of three light infantry battalions, a field artillery battalion, a cavalry squadron, an engineer battalion, and a support battalion.

== Background ==
The 50th Infantry Brigade Combat Team was the major unit of the New Jersey Army National Guard. The headquarters was located in Lawrenceville, NJ. The 50th Brigade Combat Team had two light infantry battalions, one field artillery battalion, one cavalry squadron, a special troops battalion, two MP companies, and a support battalion. Its nickname "Jersey Blues" dates back to the 17th century with the earliest units serving in both the French and Indian War (see book titled 'Colonial Tribulations'), and the Revolutionary War.

The brigade's lineage is traced to the 50th Armored Division (AD). The 50th AD was disbanded on 1 September 1993 and the division was reduced to the 50th Brigade which was subordinate unit to the 42nd Infantry Division. The 50th Brigade consisted of the 2d Battalion, 102d Armor; the 5th Squadron, 117th Cavalry; the 113th Infantry; the 114th Infantry; the 3d Battalion, 112th Field Artillery; and the 250th Support Battalion. The 50th Brigade existed up until 2007–2008 when the brigade was upgraded and converted to a brigade combat team under the Army's new modularity program.

The 50th Brigade took part in several homeland security missions after 11 September 2001. It also participated in several Global War on Terror missions before converting in 2008. The 1st Battalion, 114th Infantry took part in the Sinai Multi-National Force and Observers (MFO) Security Mission and was deployed for six months in 2004. The 2d Battalion, 102d Armor and the 2d Battalion, 113th Infantry deployed to Guantanamo Bay Cuba and served with the Joint Detention Operations Group as part of JTF-JDOG V. Battery B, 3d Battalion, 112th Field Artillery (augmented by soldiers from the 5th Squadron, 117th Cavalry) deployed to Iraq in support of Operation Iraqi Freedom II as an "In Lieu Of" Military Police Company. Batteries A and C deployed to Germany, and Italy in 2004 as provisional Military Police companies. In October 2005 elements of the brigade were activated for Operation Hurricane Katrina relief in the city of New Orleans. The 2d Battalion, 102d Armor and the 1st Battalion, 114th Infantry were called to active duty and the combined unit shipped to Louisiana to provide security for FEMA. The brigade arrived at Belle Chase Naval Air Station and from there was forward deployed to the New Orleans Convention Center. From there the elements of the 42nd Infantry Division sent teams to various parts of the city on various missions of security ranging from roving patrol to security escort for the New Orleans Fire Department and various other relief agencies. In 2006, and again in 2007, the brigade sent composite teams from across its component units as embedded trainers and advisors for the Afghan National Army.

The force structure of the brigade was changed in 2008 when the conversion to the 50th IBCT occurred. The new force structure consisted of the 1st Squadron, 102nd Cavalry Regiment, the 1st Battalion (Light), 114th Infantry Regiment, the 2nd Battalion (Light), 113th Infantry Regiment, the 3d Battalion, 112th Field Artillery Regiment, the Special Troops Battalion and the 250th Brigade Support Battalion. Equipment was brought up to current Army standards and all heavy assets were given up.

In June 2008, 26 company-sized elements of the 50th IBCT were mobilized and trained at Fort Bliss, Texas, before being separately deployed to Iraq for the 2008–2009 rotation of Operation Iraqi Freedom (OIF). The deployment of these 50th IBCT elements brought the total number of NJ National Guard Soldiers sent to Iraq and Afghanistan to over 3,200. The 50th IBCT units were mobilized for one year, including stateside training and "boots on the ground" in theater. The 50th IBCT units conducted a variety of important missions in Iraq. Pre-mobilization training began in 2007 and took place in New Jersey and Fort Indian Town Gap, Pennsylvania, with further OIF-specific preparations conducted at Fort Bliss, TX. Originally slated to deploy to Iraq in 2010, the 50th IBCT units deployed earlier to compensate for the changes needed to comply with new Department of Defense (DoD) policies. Earlier in 2007, the DoD had reduced the amount of time units spend overseas in a combat theater, which in turn shifted mobilization schedules and required earlier deployments than anticipated. The units of the 50th Infantry Brigade Combat Team were welcomed home by family and friends with a parade through Trenton, NJ on 12 June 2009, after almost a year-long tour of Iraq. The brigade units, led by their commander, Colonel Steve Ferrari, were welcomed by Governor Jon Corzine.

The force structure of the Brigade was changed again in 2015, in accordance with the Army's latest Modified Table of Organization and Equipment (MTOE) for IBCTs. The new force structure consisted of a third infantry battalion, the 1st Battalion, 181st Infantry Regiment headquartered in Worcester, Massachusetts. Additionally, the 50th Brigade Special Troops Battalion was converted to a Brigade Engineer Battalion (BEB), designated as the 104th BEB.

In March of 2024 to December 2024, the 44th Infantry Brigade Combat Team as a whole, deployed to the Central Command Area in support of Operation Spartan Shield & Inherent Resolve under CJTF-OIR and Task Force Guardian. The 44th IBCT was stationed in the main areas of Syria, Iraq and Jordan. Through their time there, the Soldiers of the 44th IBCT earned more than 650 combat action badges/combat infantryman badges/combat medical badges, 300 Bronze Stars, and more than a dozen Purple Hearts. The Jersey Blues faced multiple combat engagements, including ambush and enemy ground attack, indirect fire and more than 75 attacks from kamikaze drones.

== 44th Infantry Brigade Combat Team ==
On 15 June 2017, the 50th IBCT was reflagged as the 44th IBCT to reflect the brigade's lineage as of the 44th Infantry Division.

== Organization 2025 ==
- 44th Infantry Brigade Combat Team, in Lawrenceville (NJ)
  - Headquarters and Headquarters Company, 44th Infantry Brigade Combat Team, in Lawrenceville
  - 1st Squadron, 102nd Cavalry Regiment, in Westfield
    - Headquarters and Headquarters Troop, 1st Squadron, 102nd Cavalry Regiment, in Westfield
    - Troop A, 1st Squadron, 102nd Cavalry Regiment, in Dover
    - Troop B, 1st Squadron, 102nd Cavalry Regiment, in West Orange
    - Troop C (Dismounted), 1st Squadron, 102nd Cavalry Regiment, in Hackettstown
  - 2nd Battalion, 113th Infantry Regiment, in Riverdale
    - Headquarters and Headquarters Company, 2nd Battalion, 113th Infantry Regiment, in Riverdale
    - Company A, 2nd Battalion, 113th Infantry Regiment, in Newark
    - Company B, 2nd Battalion, 113th Infantry Regiment, in Jersey City
    - Company C, 2nd Battalion, 113th Infantry Regiment, in Woodbridge
    - Company D (Weapons), 2nd Battalion, 113th Infantry Regiment, in Jersey City
  - 1st Battalion, 114th Infantry Regiment, in Woodbury
    - Headquarters and Headquarters Company, 1st Battalion, 114th Infantry Regiment, in Woodbury
    - Company A, 1st Battalion, 114th Infantry Regiment, in Mount Holly
    - Company B, 1st Battalion, 114th Infantry Regiment, in Freehold
    - Company C, 1st Battalion, 114th Infantry Regiment, in Blackwood
    - Company D (Weapons), 1st Battalion, 114th Infantry Regiment, in Woodstown
  - 1st Battalion, 181st Infantry Regiment, in Worcester (MA) (Massachusetts Army National Guard)
    - Headquarters and Headquarters Company, 1st Battalion, 181st Infantry Regiment, in Worcester (MA)
    - Company A, 1st Battalion, 181st Infantry Regiment, in Agawam (MA)
    - Company B, 1st Battalion, 181st Infantry Regiment, in Gardner (MA) and Greenfield (MA)
    - Company C, 1st Battalion, 181st Infantry Regiment, in Cambridge (MA)
    - Company D (Weapons), 1st Battalion, 181st Infantry Regiment, in Whitinsville (MA)
  - 3rd Battalion, 112th Field Artillery Regiment, in Morristown
    - Headquarters and Headquarters Battery, 3rd Battalion, 112th Field Artillery Regiment, in Morristown
      - Detachment 1, Headquarters and Headquarters Battery, 3rd Battalion, 112th Field Artillery Regiment, in Freehold
    - Battery A, 3rd Battalion, 112th Field Artillery Regiment, in Morristown
    - Battery B, 3rd Battalion, 112th Field Artillery Regiment, in Flemington
    - Battery C, 3rd Battalion, 112th Field Artillery Regiment, in Toms River
  - 104th Brigade Engineer Battalion, in Port Murray
    - Headquarters and Headquarters Company, 104th Brigade Engineer Battalion, in Port Murray
    - Company A (Combat Engineer), 104th Brigade Engineer Battalion, in West Orange
    - Company B (Combat Engineer), 104th Brigade Engineer Battalion, in Hammonton
    - Company C (Signal), 104th Brigade Engineer Battalion, in Lawrenceville
    - Company D (Military Intelligence), 104th Brigade Engineer Battalion, in West Orange
      - Detachment 1, Company D (Military Intelligence), 104th Brigade Engineer Battalion, at Joint Base McGuire–Dix–Lakehurst (RQ-28A UAV)
  - 250th Brigade Support Battalion, in Teaneck
    - Headquarters and Headquarters Company, 250th Brigade Support Battalion, in Teaneck
    - Company A (Distribution), 250th Brigade Support Battalion, in Teaneck
    - Company B (Maintenance), 250th Brigade Support Battalion, in Manchester
    - Company C (Medical), 250th Brigade Support Battalion, in Jersey City
    - Company D (Forward Support), 250th Brigade Support Battalion, in Westfield — attached to 1st Squadron, 102nd Cavalry Regiment
    - Company E (Forward Support), 250th Brigade Support Battalion, in Port Murray — attached to 104th Brigade Engineer Battalion
    - Company F (Forward Support), 250th Brigade Support Battalion, in Morristown — attached to 3rd Battalion, 112th Field Artillery Regiment
    - Company G (Forward Support), 250th Brigade Support Battalion, in Vineland — attached to 1st Battalion, 114th Infantry Regiment
    - Company H (Forward Support), 250th Brigade Support Battalion, in Teaneck — attached to 2nd Battalion, 113th Infantry Regiment
    - Company I (Forward Support), 250th Brigade Support Battalion, in Worcester (MA) — attached to 1st Battalion, 181st Infantry Regiment (Massachusetts Army National Guard)

== Campaign participation credit ==
=== World War I ===
- Meuse-Argonne (1918)
- Alsace (1918)

=== World War II ===
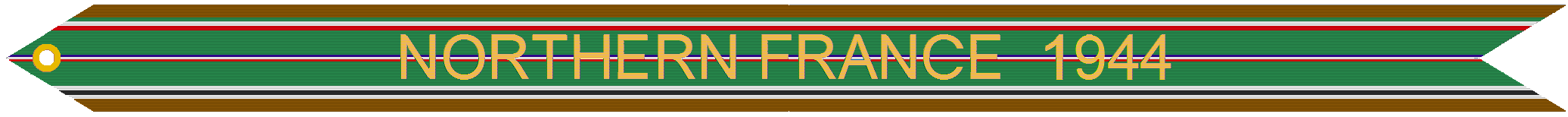
- Northern France (1944)
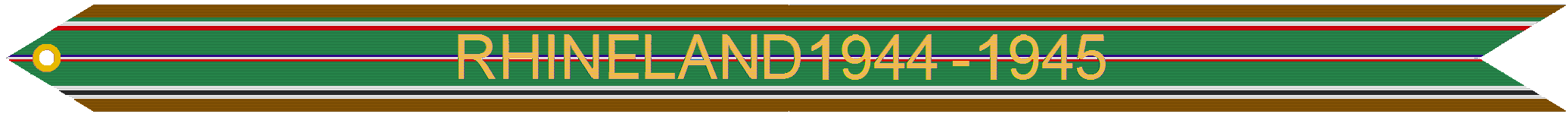
- The Rhineland (1944-1945)
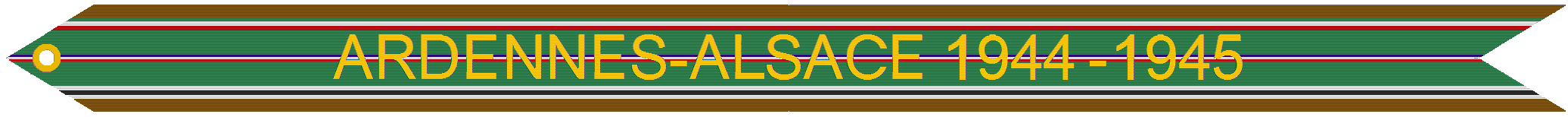
- Ardennes-Alsace (1944-1945)
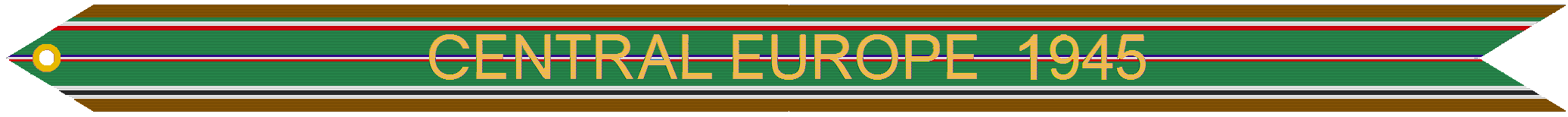
- Central Europe (1945)

=== War on Terrorism ===
- Operation Iraqi Freedom: Iraqi Surge (2008)
- Operation Iraqi Freedom: Iraqi Sovereignty (2009)
- Operation Enduring Freedom / Operation Inherent Resolve: Abeyance (2014-2015)
- Operation Inherent Resolve: Intensification (2024)

=== Former Republic of Yugoslavia ===
- Operation Joint Guardian - Kosovo (KFOR) (2019-2020)

== Decorations ==
- Presidential Unit Citation
  - Schalbach, Europe (1944–1945)
- Joint Meritorious Unit Award
  - Guantanamo Bay, Cuba (2004–2005)
  - Iraq (2008–2009)
- Meritorious Unit Commendation
  - Southwest Asia (2014-2015)
