= John E. Woodward =

United States Army general (1870–1944)

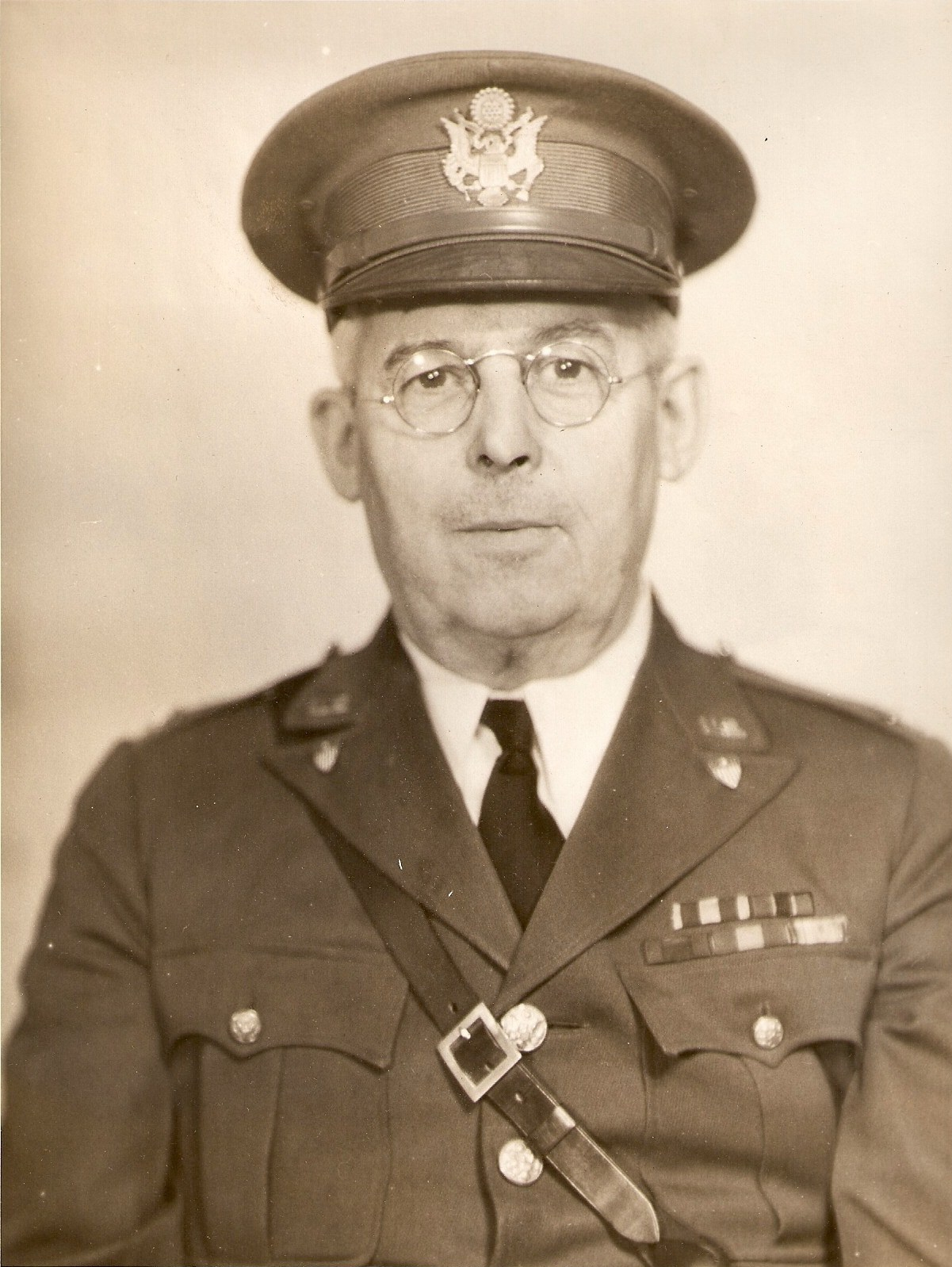
- Woodward as a colonel, circa 1920
- Born: May 24, 1870; Poultney, Vermont, U.S.
- Died: August 4, 1944 (aged 74); Mendon, Vermont, U.S.
- Burial place: West Point Cemetery
- Spouse: Frances Hoven Judge (m. 1896–1944, his death)
- Children: 5
- Military career
- Allegiance: United States
- Service: United States Army
- Service years: 1892–1934
- Rank: Brigadier General
- Service number: 0–411
- Units: U.S. Infantry Branch; U.S. Army Adjutant General's Corps
- Commands: Company L, 9th Infantry Regiment; Camp Eldridge, Philippines; U.S. Army Garrison, Dongshan, China; 113th Infantry Regiment; Camp Upton; 152d Depot Brigade; 24th Infantry Brigade; 151st Depot Brigade; 12th Division
- Wars: Spanish–American War: Battle of San Juan Hill; Siege of Santiago; Philippine–American War; Moro Rebellion; Pancho Villa Expedition; World War I

John Edwin Woodward (May 24, 1870 – August 4, 1944) was a career officer in the United States Army. A veteran of the Spanish–American War, Philippine–American War, Moro Rebellion, Pancho Villa Expedition, and World War I, he served from 1892 to 1934 and attained the rank of brigadier general. Woodward was most notable for his command of the 113th Infantry Regiment, Camp Upton, 152d Depot Brigade, 24th Infantry Brigade, 151st Depot Brigade, and 12th Division.

A native of Poultney, Vermont, Woodward was raised in the village of Rutland, Vermont, where his father served as police chief, and he was an 1887 graduate of Rutland High School. In 1888 he began attendance at the United States Military Academy (West Point); he graduated in 1892 and was commissioned as a second lieutenant of Infantry. Assigned initially to the 16th Infantry Regiment, Woodward served at Fort Douglas, Utah. He served in Cuba during the Spanish–American War and received promotion to first lieutenant.

Woodward served in the Philippines during the Philippine–American War and in 1901 he was promoted to captain in the 29th Infantry Regiment. Between 1901 and 1910, Woodward served at several posts in the United States, including Fort Douglas and Fort Sheridan, Illinois, and was twice more stationed in the Philippines. From 1910 to 1912, Woodward commanded Company L, 9th Infantry Regiment at Fort Jay, New York. He served in the Philippines again from 1912 to 1915, and was promoted to major in the 24th Infantry Regiment. From March to September 1915, he commanded the post at Camp Eldridge in the Laguna province. Woodward served in China in 1915 and 1916, first with the 15th Infantry Regiment in Tianjin, and later as commander of the garrison at Dongshan.

In April 1916, Woodward was assigned to the 7th Infantry Regiment in El Paso, Texas, and he served on the Mexico–United States border during the Pancho Villa Expedition. In May he was transferred to the Adjutant General's Corps. In July he was assigned as adjutant of the Army's Arizona District with headquarters at Camp Harry J. Jones in Douglas, Arizona. In May 1917, Woodward promoted to lieutenant colonel and assigned to duty in the office of the Adjutant General of the United States Army. During World War I, he was promoted to temporary colonel in August 1917, and he successively commanded the 113th Infantry Regiment at Camp McClellan, Alabama, the 152d Depot Brigade and Camp Upton, New York, the 24th Infantry Brigade at Camp Devens, Massachusetts, and the 151st Depot Brigade at Camp Devens. He was promoted to temporary brigadier general in August 1918.

Woodward returned to the permanent grade of lieutenant colonel in March 1919 and served with the 42nd Infantry Regiment. From 1919 to 1920 he attended the United States Army Command and General Staff College, and he was promoted to permanent colonel in July 1920. He graduated from the United States Army War College in 1921, and his subsequent assignments included adjutant of the First Corps Area in Boston, and Second Corps Area at Governors Island, New York. Woodward retired upon reaching the mandatory retirement age of 64 in May 1934. In retirement he was a resident of Washington, D.C. and Mendon, Vermont. He died in Mendon on August 4, 1944, and was buried at West Point Cemetery.

== Early life ==
Woodward was born in Poultney, Vermont on May 24, 1870, a son of Adrian T. Woodward (1847–1927) and Ada Elizabeth (Ryan) Woodward (1851–1936). A. T. Woodward was a Union Army veteran of the American Civil War who served as police chief of the village of Rutland, Vermont. Woodward was raised and educated in Rutland, and was an 1887 graduate of Rutland High School.

In July 1887, Woodward passed a qualifying exam to be considered for appointment to the United States Military Academy. He passed the entrance examination in June 1888, and began attendance that fall. He graduated in 1892 ranked 51st of 62 and received his commission as a second lieutenant in the Infantry branch.

== Start of career ==
After receiving his commission, Woodward was assigned to the 16th Infantry Regiment at Fort Douglas, Utah. He served at Fort Douglas from September 1892 to November 1893, when he was assigned to the School of Torpedo Instruction (Note: The School of Torpedo Instruction taught the use of underwater mines (torpedoes) for harbor defense.) at Willets Point, Queens, New York. After graduating in October 1894, Woodward returned to duty at Fort Douglas, where he remained until October 1896. From October 1896 to April 1898, Woodward was assigned to duty at Fort Sherman, Idaho. He was promoted to first lieutenant on April 26, 1898.

During the Spanish–American War, Woodward served initially with the 16th Infantry during its organization and training at Camp George H. Thomas, Georgia and Camp Tampa, Florida. He served in Cuba in the summer of 1898, including participation in the Battle of San Juan Hill and Siege of Santiago. He became the regimental quartermaster at the end of the month, and traveled with the unit to Camp Wikoff, New York, for post-war reorganization. From September 1898 to January 1899, he served with the 16th Infantry at Camp Albert G. Forse, Alabama. From January to May 1899, the 16th Infantry was stationed at Fort Crook, Nebraska, and Woodward was assigned as regimental commissary officer in May.

Woodward served in the Philippines from May 1899 to July 1901. During his Philippine–American War service, he was initially assigned as commissary officer of the 16th Infantry, and he served in this position until June 1900. From June 1900 to March 1901, he was assistant commissary of subsistence officer for units of United States Volunteers in the Philippines, and he was promoted to captain in the 29th Infantry Regiment in February 1901. From February 1899 to April 1901, Woodward served additional duty as inspector of customs for the port of Aparri, and he was the captain of the port from December 1899 to April 1901. His other additional duties included chief commissary, 2nd District, Department of Northern Luzon (January 1900 to April 1901). Woodward served as depot commissary for the Department of Northern Luzon from June to July 1901.

== Continued career ==
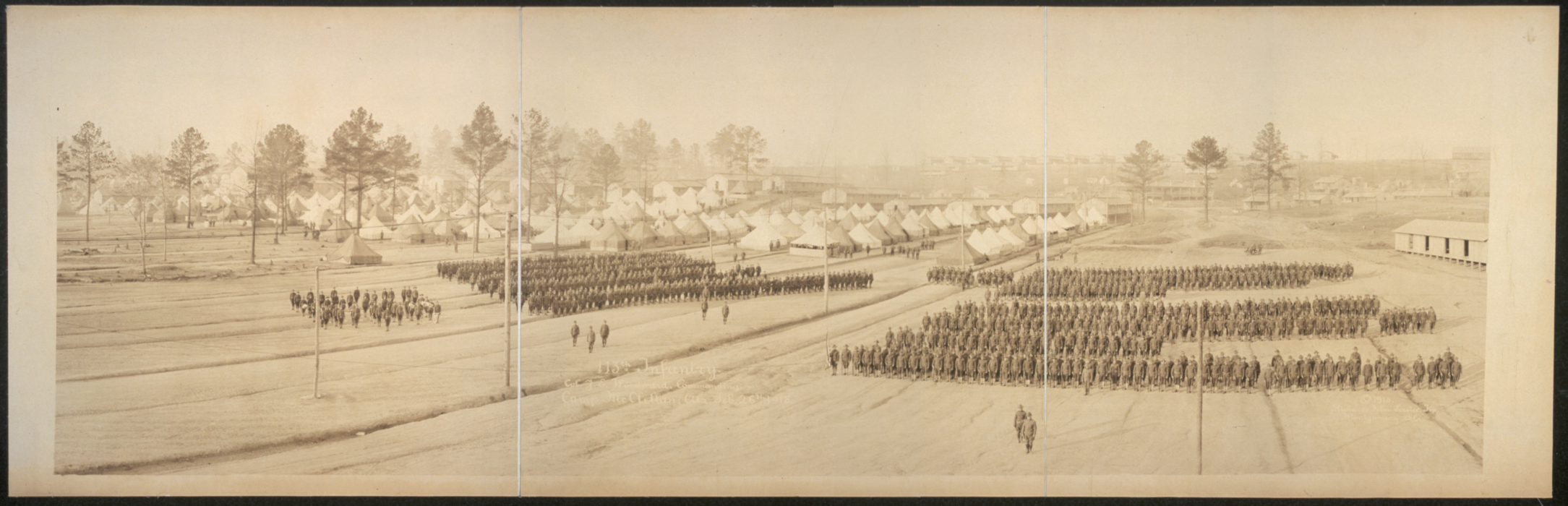
113th Infantry Regiment, commanded by Woodward, Camp McClellan, February 1918

Woodward served with the 29th Infantry at Fort Sheridan, Illinois from September 1901 to February 1902. He then returned to the Philippines, where he remained until May 1904. During this service, Woodward took part in the Moro Rebellion, including engagements in Surigao. After returning to the United States, Woodward served with the 29th Infantry at Fort Douglas from May 1904 to August 1907. He served in the Philippines again from August 1907 to September 1909, then was assigned to Fort Jay, New York.

In September 1910, Woodward was relieved as commissary officer of the 29th Infantry and assigned to command the regiment's Company L, which he commanded at Fort Jay until September 1912. From September 1912 to February 1914, Woodward served as aide-de-camp to Major General Thomas Henry Barry, commander of the Department of the East. When Barry commanded the Philippine Department from March 1914 to April 1916, Woodward continued to serve as his aide. In February 1915, Woodward received promotion to major in the 24th Infantry Regiment and, from March to September 1915, he commanded Camp Eldridge in the Laguna province.

In September 1915, Woodward transferred to the 15th Infantry Regiment in Tianjin, China, and he subsequently commanded the U.S. Army garrison at Dongshan. He returned to the United States in May 1916, where he joined the 7th Infantry Regiment at El Paso, Texas. Woodward served on the Mexico–United States border during the Pancho Villa Expedition until July 1916, when he was assigned as adjutant of the Arizona District and posted to Camp Harry J. Jones in Douglas, Arizona.

== Later career ==
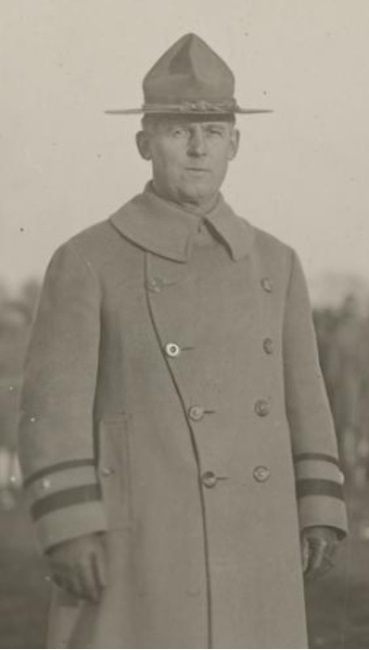
Woodward as a brigadier general at Camp Devens, April 1919

In May 1917, a month after the American entry into World War I, Woodward was promoted to lieutenant colonel and assigned to staff duty in the Washington, D.C. office of the Adjutant General of the United States Army. In August 1917, Woodward was promoted to temporary colonel and assigned to the 77th Division at Camp Upton. Later that month, he was assigned to command the 152d Depot Brigade at Camp Upton.

From December 1917 to April 1918, Woodward commanded the 113th Infantry Regiment during its organization and training at Camp McClellan, Alabama. From April to August 1918, he again commanded the 152d Depot Brigade and also commanded Camp Upton. In August 1918, he received temporary promotion to brigadier general.

From August 1918 to February 1919, Woodward commanded the 24th Infantry Brigade at Camp Devens, Massachusetts. The Armistice with Germany on November 11 ended the war before Woodward's brigade departed for overseas duty in France, and he commanded the 151st Depot Brigade at Camp Devens from February to April 1919. In February 1919, he also served as acting commander of the 12th Division, the 24th Brigade's parent formation. In March 1919, he returned to the permanent rank of lieutenant colonel.

Woodward served with the 42nd Infantry Regiment at Camp Upton from May to August 1919. He was a student at the United States Army Command and General Staff College from August 1919 until graduating in June 1920. In July 1920, he was promoted to permanent colonel. From August 1920 to June 1921, he was a student at the United States Army War College. He attended the Institute of Politics at Williams College in 1923 and 1924. After graduating, he served on the War Department General Staff until June 1925.

In June 1925, Woodward was assigned as adjutant of the First Corps Area in Boston. In August 1929, he was posted to duty as adjutant of the Second Corps Area at Governors Island, New York. He retired in May 1934 after reaching the mandatory retirement age of 64. In 1930, Congress enacted a law permitting World War I general officers to retire at the highest rank they held, so when Woodward retired he was promoted to brigadier general on the retired list.

== Retirement and death ==
In retirement, Woodward was a resident of Washington, D.C. and maintained a summer home in Mendon, Vermont. He died in Mendon on August 4, 1944. Woodward was buried at West Point Cemetery.

== Family ==
In 1896, Woodward married Frances Hoven Judge (1873–1952). They were the parents of five children: Mary, Nancy, John, Thomas, and Edwin.
