= 113th Infantry Regiment (United States) =

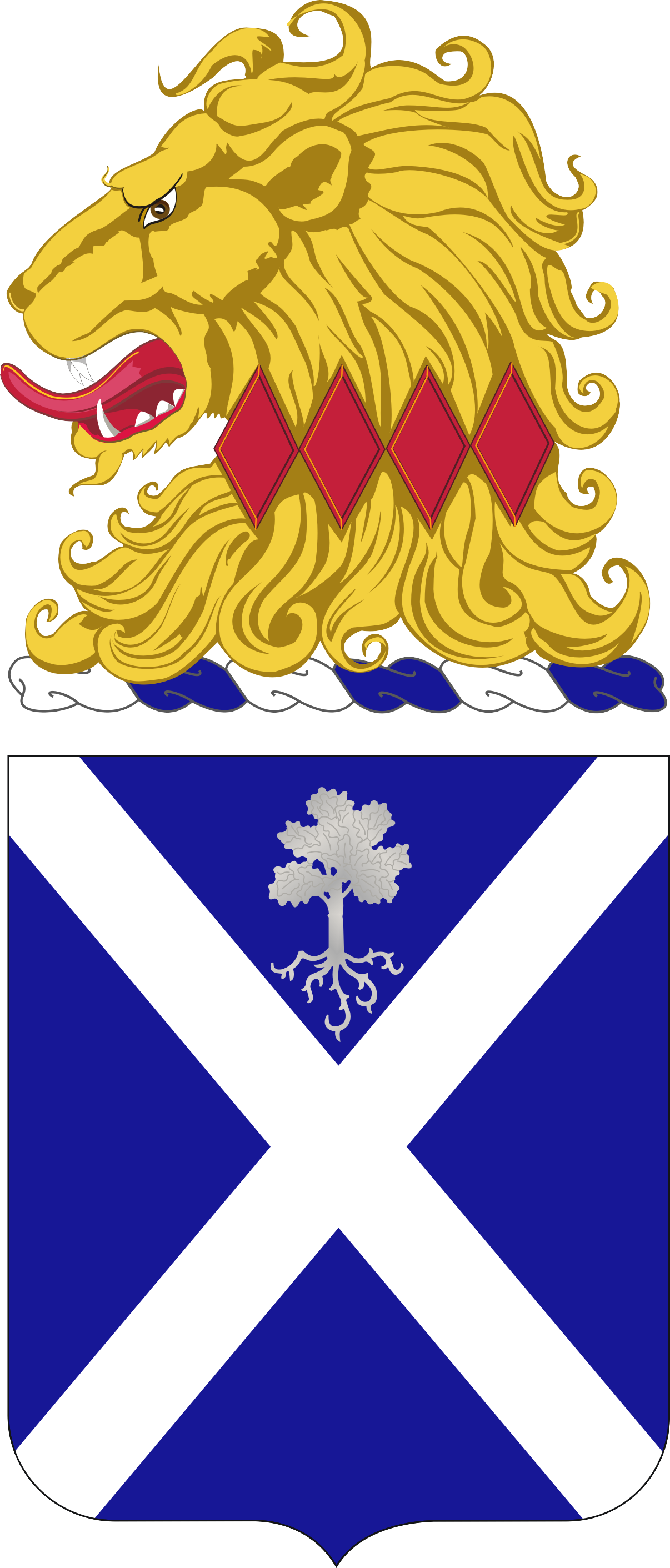
- Coat of arms
- Active: 1775
- Country: United States
- Branch: New Jersey Army National Guard
- Type: Infantry
- Size: Regiment
- Part of: 44th Infantry Brigade Combat Team (United States), NJ ARNG
- Nickname: FIRST NEW JERSEY
- Mottos: Fidelis et Fortis (Faithful and Brave)

Commanders
- Notable commanders: John E. Woodward; Julius Ochs Adler

Insignia
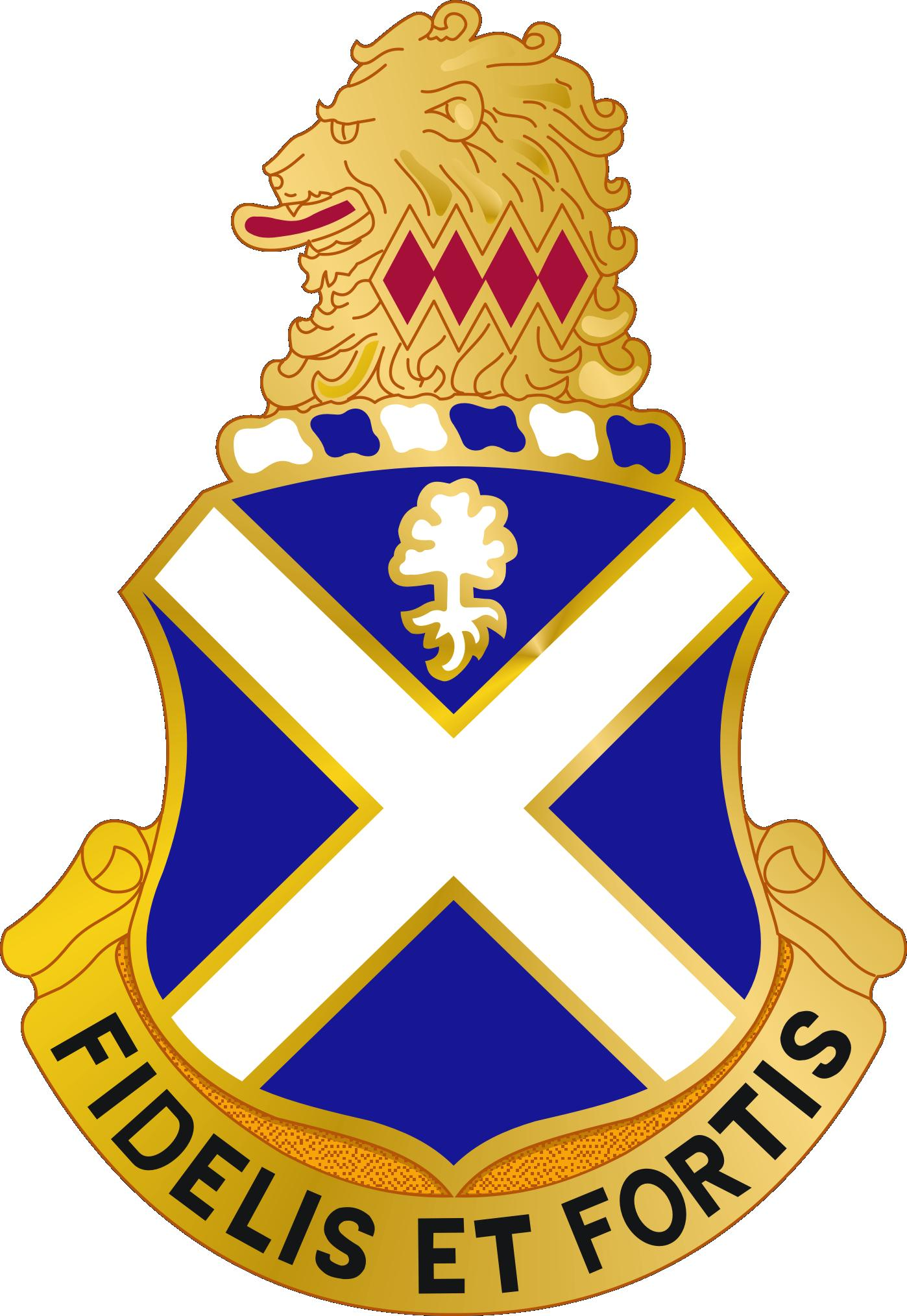
- Distinctive Unit Insignia

The 113th Infantry Regiment is an Infantry regiment of the New Jersey Army National Guard. It is one of several National Guard units with colonial roots and campaign credit for the War of 1812.

== Lineage ==
The unit's origins lie in the 1st New Jersey Regiment, Continental Army, created 26 October - 15 December 1775 to consist in part of existing militia companies from Essex County.

- Assigned 22 May 1777 to the New Jersey Brigade, an element of the Main Army
- Reorganized and redesignated 1 March 1783 as the New Jersey Regiment
- Furloughed 6 June 1783 at Newburgh, New York
- Disbanded 15 November 1783

Reorganized 5 June 1793 in the New Jersey Militia and expanded to form the Essex Brigade (Elements of the Essex Brigade mustered into federal service during 1814)

- Essex Brigade reorganized 12 February 1852 and units from Newark and Elizabeth withdrawn to form the Independent Essex Brigade (remainder of Essex Brigade hereafter separate lineages)
- Independent Essex Brigade redesignated 2 February 1858 as the Newark Brigade
- 1st Regiment, Newark Brigade, organized in 1858 at Newark

Mustered into federal service 30 April 1861 at Trenton as the 1st Regiment, New Jersey Brigade; mustered out of federal service 31 July 1861 at Newark

- Reorganized and mustered into federal service 14 September 1861 at Trenton as the 8th Regiment of Infantry, New Jersey Volunteers
- Reorganized and redesignated 21 September 1864 as the 8th Battalion, New Jersey Volunteers; consolidated 12 October 1864 with the 6th Battalion, New Jersey Volunteers (mustered into federal service 19 August 1861 at Trenton as the 6th Regiment of Infantry, New Jersey Volunteers), and consolidated unit reorganized and redesignated as the 8th Regiment of Infantry, New Jersey Volunteers
- Mustered out of federal service 17 July 1865 at Washington, D.C.

Former 1st Regiment, Newark Brigade, reorganized and redesignated 19 July 1865 as the 1st Regiment, New Jersey Rifle Corps

- (New Jersey Militia redesignated 9 March 1869 as the New Jersey National Guard)
- Reorganized 14 April 1869 in the New Jersey National Guard as the 1st Regiment
- Consolidated 22 June 1875 with the 2nd Regiment (see ANNEX 1) and consolidated unit designated as the 1st Regiment
- Consolidated 31 May 1892 with the 5th Regiment (Veteran) (see ANNEX 2) and consolidated unit designated as the 1st Regiment
- Mustered into federal service 5 ‑ 12 May 1898 at Sea Girt as the 1st New Jersey Volunteer Infantry; mustered out of federal service 4 November 1898 at Newark
- Reorganized 2 May 1899 in the New Jersey National Guard as the 1st Regiment with headquarters at Newark (1st Battalion, 2nd Regiment {see ANNEX 3}, concurrently reorganized and redesignated as Companies A, C, K, and M, 1st Regiment; companies withdrawn 4 February 1902 and reorganized as the 1st Battalion, 5th Regiment)
- Mustered into federal service 21 June 1916 at Sea Girt; mustered out of federal service 10 October 1916 at Newark
- Mustered into federal service 25 March 1917 at Newark; drafted into federal service 5 August 1917
- Consolidated 11 October 1917 with the 4th Regiment (see ANNEX 4), 2nd Regiment organized in 1899 through consolidation of the 3rd Regiment (organized in 1866 in the New Jersey Rifle Corps with headquarters at New Brunswick) and the 7th Regiment (organized in 1869 in the New Jersey National Guard as the 3rd Battalion with headquarters at Trenton; expanded, reorganized, and redesignated in 1872 as the 7th Regiment with headquarters at Lambertville) and consolidated unit reorganized and redesignated as the 113th Infantry and assigned to the 29th Division
- Demobilized 27‑28 May 1919 at Camp Dix, New Jersey

Former 1st and 4th Regiments consolidated with the 1st Battalion, 114th Infantry, and reorganized in the New Jersey National Guard as the 6th Infantry with headquarters federally recognized 13 November 1919 at Newark

- Redesignated 17 June 1921 as the 113th Infantry and assigned to the 44th Division
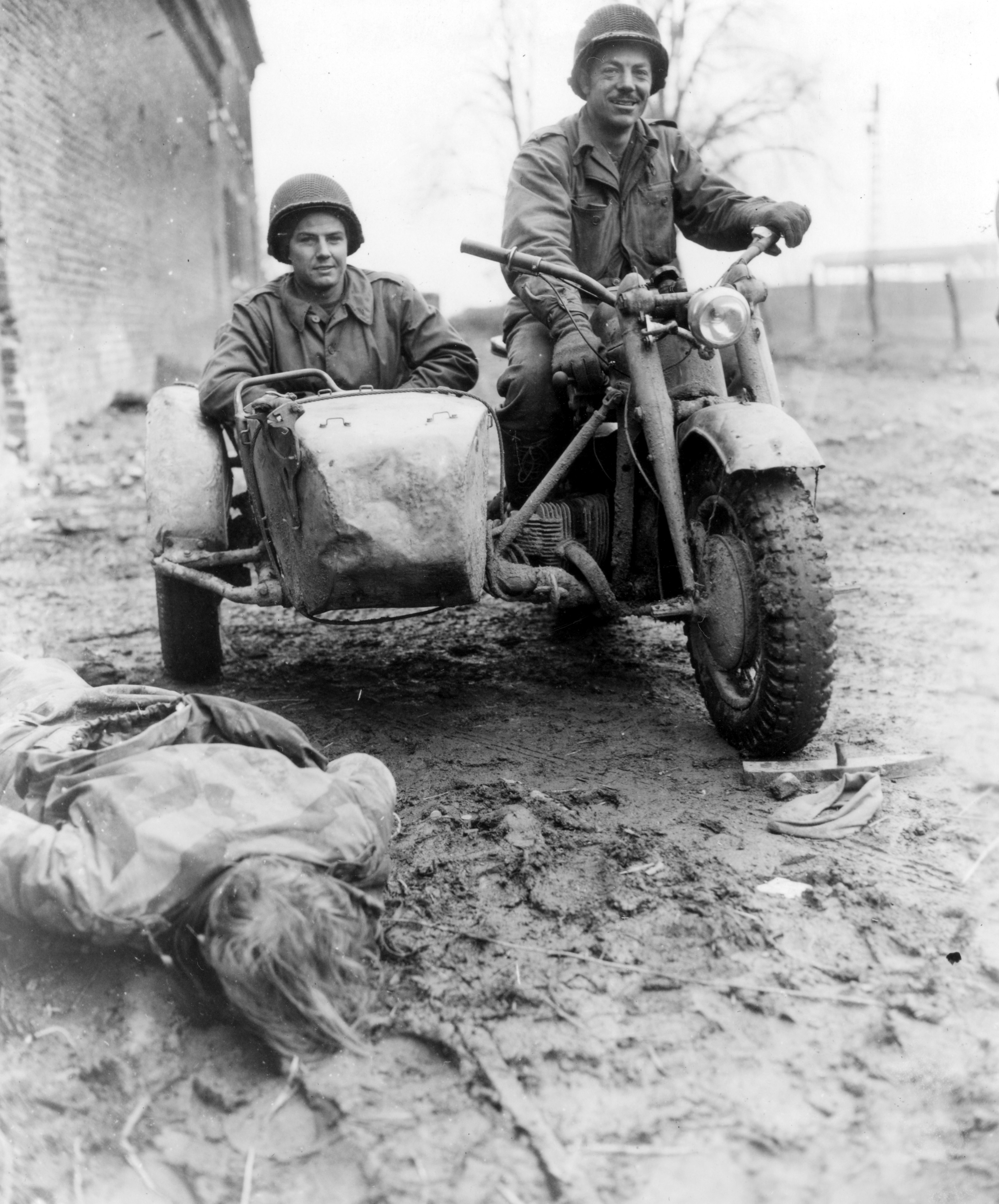
- 113th Infantry Regiment soldiers in a sidecar in Germany, 26 February 1945
  Inducted into federal service 16 September 1940 at home stations
- Relieved 16 February 1942 at Fort Hancock, New Jersey from assignment to the 44th Division, reassigned to Eastern Defense Command 30 April 1942, relocated to Fort Hamilton, New York 19 March 1943
- Inactivated 25 September 1945 at Fort Rucker, Alabama

Consolidated 9 July 1946 with the 324th Infantry (see ANNEX 5) and consolidated unit designated as the 113th Infantry

- Regiment (less 2nd Battalion) reorganized and federally recognized 14 November 1946 at Newark as the 113th Armored Infantry Battalion and assigned to the 50th Armored Division; 2nd Battalion reorganized and federally recognized 3 December 1946 at Paterson as the 215th Armored Infantry Battalion and assigned to the 50th Armored Division (United States)
- 113th and 215th Armored Infantry Battalions consolidated, reorganized, and redesignated 1 March 1959 as the 113th Infantry, a parent regiment under the Combat Arms Regimental System, to consist of the 1st and 2nd Armored Rifle Battalions, elements of the 50th Armored Division
- Reorganized 31 January 1963 to consist of the 1st and 2nd Battalions, elements of the 50th Armored Division
- Reorganized 1 July 1975 to consist of the 1st, 2nd, and 3rd Battalions, elements of the 50th Armored Division
- Reorganized 16 October 1984 to consist of the 2nd and 3rd Battalions, elements of the 50th Armored Division.

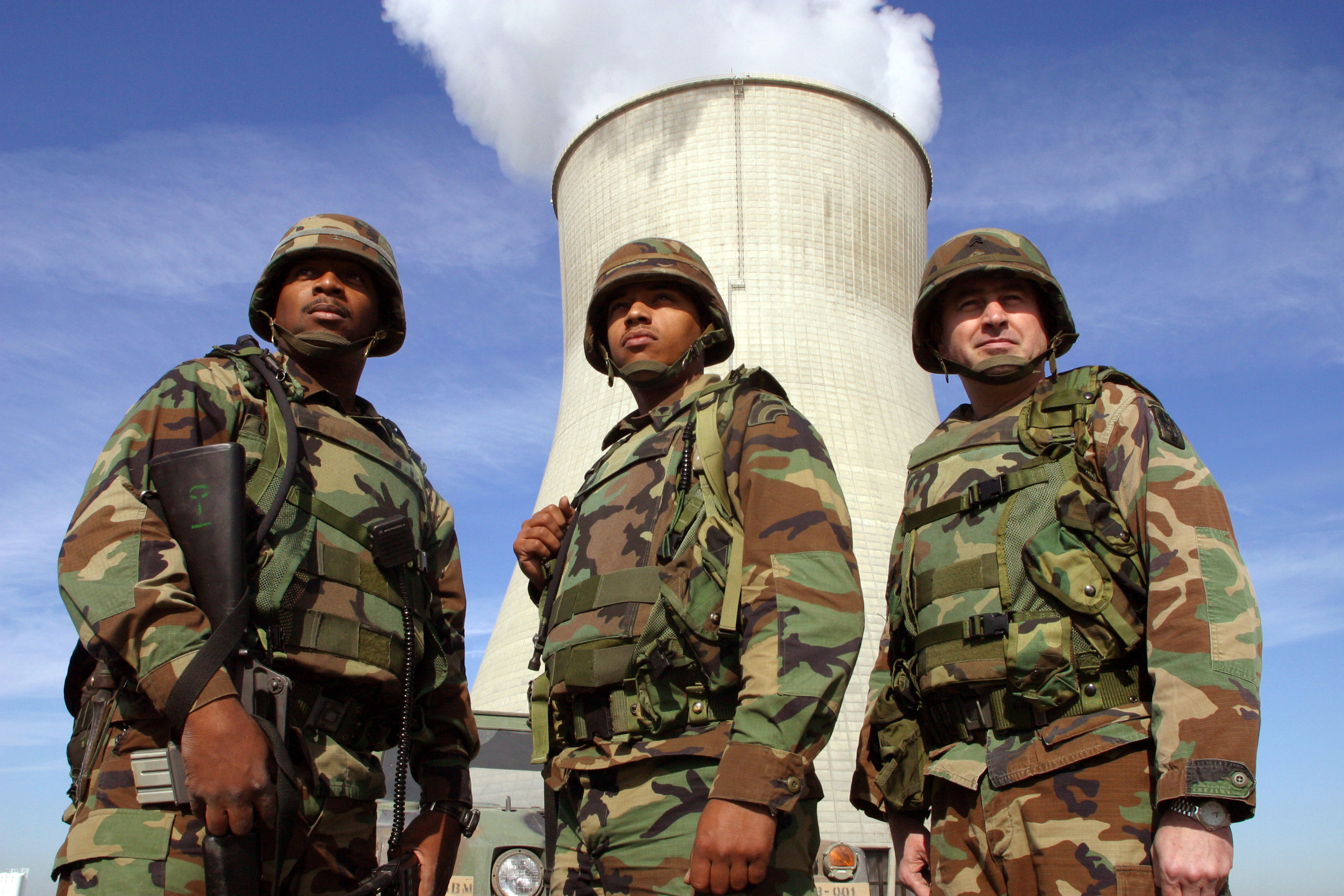
Soldiers with 2-113th Infantry, New Jersey Army National Guard, stand guard at the Salem Nuclear Power Plant, Oct. 22, 2002.

Withdrawn 1 May 1989 from the Combat Arms Regimental System and reorganized under the United States Army Regimental System

- Reorganized 1 September 1991 to consist of the 2nd Battalion, an element of the 50th Armored Division
- Reorganized 1 September 1993 to consist of the 2nd Battalion, an element of the 42nd Infantry Division. In 2012 the single remaining battalion of the regiment is assigned to the 50th Infantry Brigade Combat Team, NJ ARNG.
- Redesignated 1 October 2005 as the 113th Infantry Regiment
- Reorganized to consist of the 1st Battalion, an element of the 50th Infantry Brigade Combat Team

=== Annex 1 ===
- Mustered into federal service 27 May 1861 at Trenton as the 2d Regiment of Infantry, New Jersey Volunteers
- Reorganized 17 December 1864 as the 2d Battalion, New Jersey Volunteers; mustered out of federal service 11 July 1865 at Hall's Hill, Virginia
- Reorganized 19 July 1865 as the 2d Regiment, New Jersey Rifle Corps, with headquarters at Newark
- Reorganized 14 April 1869 I the New Jersey National Guard as the 2d Regiment

=== Annex 2 ===
- Organized in 1866 in the New Jersey Militia at Newark as the 1st Battalion, Veterans
- Expanded, reorganized and redesignated in 1867 as the Veteran Regiment
- Reorganized 14 April 1869 in the New Jersey National Guard as the 5th Regiment (Veteran)

=== Annex 3 ===
- Organized 31 January 1880 as the Paterson Light Guard
- Reorganized 25 May 1880 in the New Jersey National Guard as the 1st Battalion
- Reorganized and redesignated 8 June 1892 as the 1st Battalion, 2d Regiment
- Mustered into federal service 13–15 May 1898 at Sea Girt as the 1st Battalion, 2d New Jersey Volunteer Infantry; mustered out of federal service 17 November 1898 at Paterson
- Reorganized 2 May 1899 in the New Jersey National Guard as Companies A, C, K, and M, 1st Regiment
- Reorganized and redesignated 4 February 1902 as the 1st Battalion, 5th Regiment
- Mustered into federal service 21–26 June at Sea Girt; mustered out of federal service 10–14 November 1916 at Paterson
- Mustered into federal service 25 March 1917 at Paterson; drafted into federal service 5 August 1917
- Reorganized and redesignated 11 October 1917 as the 1st Battalion, 114th Infantry, an element of the 29th Division
- Demobilized 14 May 1919 at Camp Dix, New Jersey

=== Annex 4 ===
- Organized from exiting units in the Hudson Brigade, New Jersey Militia and mustered into federal service 1 May 1861 at Trenton as the 2d Regiment, New Jersey Brigade; mustered out of federal service 31 July 1861 at Trenton and reorganized in the New Jersey Militia as the 2d Regiment, Hudson Brigade
- Reorganized 14 April 1869 in the New Jersey National Guard as the 1st Battalion with headquarters at Hoboken
- Expanded, reorganized, and redesignated 6 April 1874 as the 9th Regiment with headquarters at Hoboken
- Redesignated 27 March 1886 as the 2d Regiment
- Consolidated 31 May 1892 with the 4th Regiment (organized in 1867 in the New Jersey Rifle Corps as the 4th Regiment with headquarters at Hudson City; reorganized 14 April 1869 in the New Jersey National Guard as the 4th Regiment with headquarters at Jersey City)
- Mustered into federal service 7–24 July 1898 at Sea Girt as the 4th New Jersey Volunteer Infantry; mustered out of federal service 6 April 1899 at Greenville, South Carolina
- Reorganized 2 May 1899 in the New Jersey National Guard as the 4th Regiment with headquarters at Jersey City
- Mustered into federal service 21 June 1916 at Sea Girt; mustered out of federal service 13 October 1916 at Sea Girt
- Mustered into federal service 12 April 1917 at Jersey City; drafted into federal service 5 October 1917

=== Annex 5 ===
- Constituted 5 August 1917 in the National Army as the 324th Infantry and assigned to the 81st Division
- Organized in September 1917 at Camp Jackson, South Carolina
- Demobilized 17 June 1919 at Camp Devens, Massachusetts
- Reconstituted 24 June 1921 in the Organized Reserves as the 324th Infantry and assigned to the 81st Division
- Organized in January 1922 with headquarters at Memphis, Tennessee
- Inactivated 30 January 1942 and relieved from assignment to the 81st Division
- Withdrawn 1 February 1943 from the Organized Reserves, allotted to the Army of the United States, and activated at Fort Lewis, Washington, as an element of the 44th Infantry Division

== Commanders ==
- 2026–Present LTC Joseph D. Grillo
- 2021–2026 LTC Brian Gregg
- 2019 - 2021 COL Nicholas Calenicoff
- 2017 – 2019 COL Richard T. Karcher
- 2014 – 2017 COL Walter R. Gill
- 2012 – 2014 LTC Douglas J. Brockmann
- 2010 – 2012 COL Paul Nema
- 2008 – 2010 BG Mark A. Piterski
- 2007 – 2008 LTC James A. Hayes
- 2005 – 2007 COL Nicholas Chimienti
- 2004 – 2005 LTC Patrick M. Dacey
- 2002 – 2004 LTC Kenneth R. Rausa
- 1998 – 2002 LTC Joseph M. O'Connor
- 1997 - 1998 LTC James L. Guerrieri
- 1996 – 1997 COL Peter F. Falco
- 1994 – 1996 COL Richard W. Kuechenmeister
- 1990 – 1994 COL Leonard Luzky
- 1988 – 1990 LTC John Promaulayko
- 1986 – 1988 COL Warren J. Curd
- 1943 – 1943 LTC Vinton L. James
- 1942 – 1943 COL Gilbert B. Brownwell
- 1941 – 1942 MG Norman H. Schwarkoff
- 1940 – 1941 MG Manton S. Eddy
- 1918 – 1918 COL John E. Woodward
- 1917 – 1917 COL John D. Fraser
- 1898 – 1898 COL Robert G. Smith
- 1864 – 1865 COL John Ramsay
- 1863 – 1864 MAJ John G. Langston
- 1862 – 1863 COL John Ramsay
- 1861 – 1862 COL Adolphus J. Johnson

Note: Highest Rank Attained by Commander Listed

== Command Sergeant Major ==
- 2025 - Present CSM David Chaika
- 2021 - 2025 CSM Lisandro Peralta
- 2017 – 2021 CSM Kevin Kirkpatrick
- 2015 – 2017 CSM Leonel Abreu
- 2014 - 2015 CSM Michael Colbert
- 2011 – 2014 CSM Thomas E. Alexander
- 2006 – 2011 CSM Thomas J. Clark
- 2005 – 2006 CSM Ricardo Reyes
- 2004 – 2005 CSM Joseph V. Tatem
- 1995 – 2004 CSM Jerome Jenkins
- 1992 – 1995 CSM Robert Trainor
- 1989 – 1992 CSM Donald Feldhan

== Campaign Participation ==
=== Revolutionary War ===
- Canada 1776

- New York 1776

- Brandywine 1777

- Germantown 1777

- New Jersey 1777

- New York 1777

- Monmouth 1778

- New York 1779

- New Jersey 1780

- Yorktown 1781

=== War of 1812 ===
- Streamer Without inscription

=== Civil War ===
- Bull Run
- Peninsula

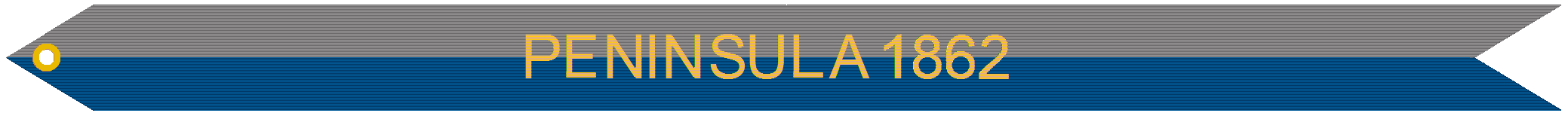

- Manassas
- Antietam
- Fredericksburg

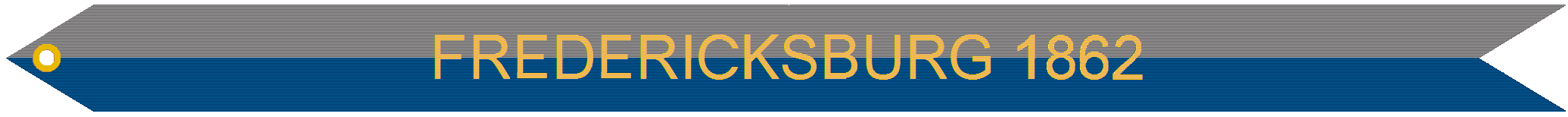

- Chancellorsville

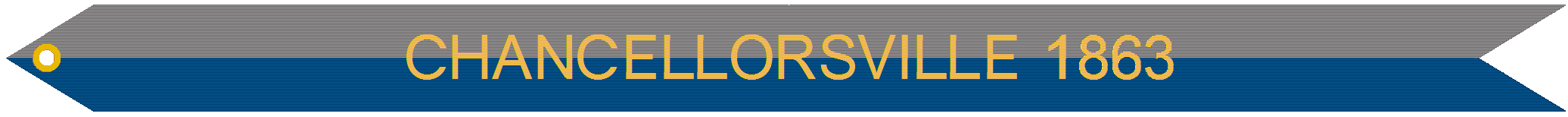

- Gettysburg

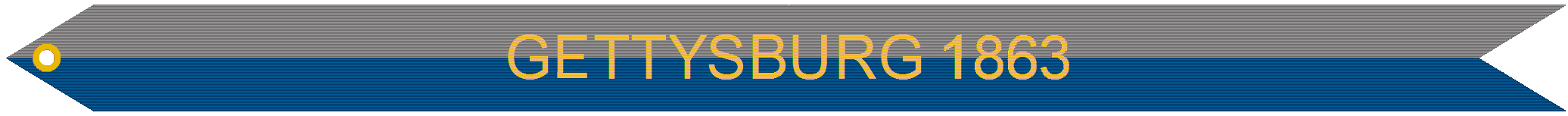

- Wilderness
- Spotsylvania
- Cold Harbor

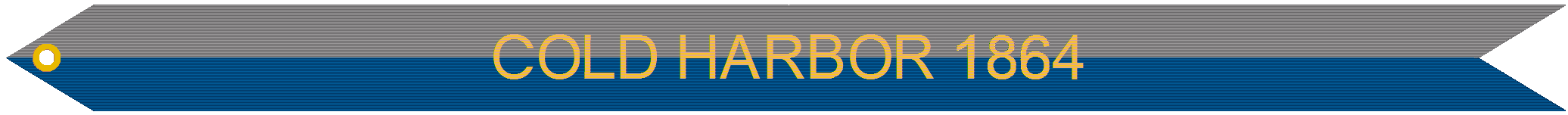

- Petersburg

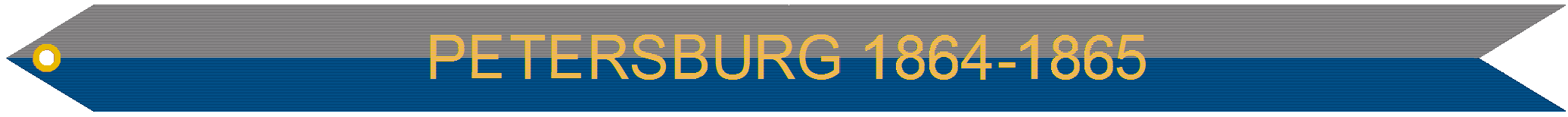

- Shenandoah
- Appomattox

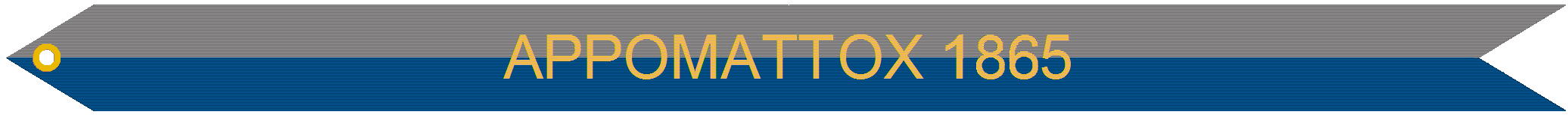

- Virginia 1863

=== World War I ===
- Meuse-Argonne

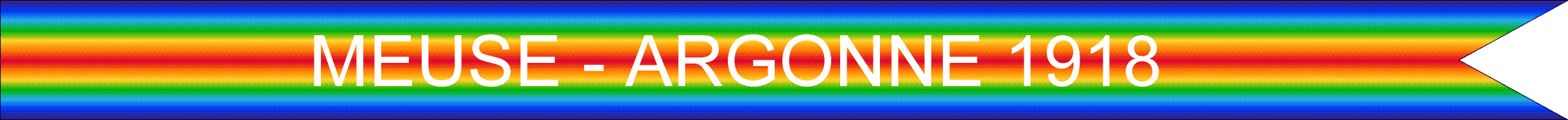

- Alsace 1918
- Lorraine 1918

=== World War II ===
- Northern France

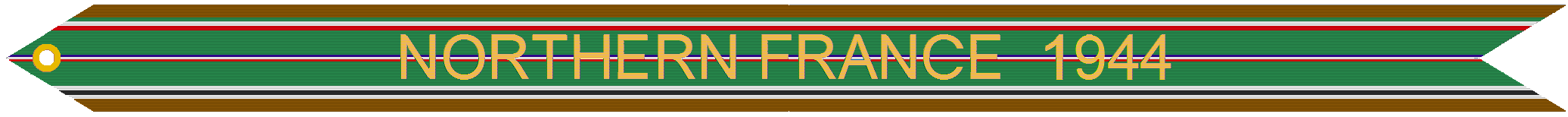

- The Rhineland

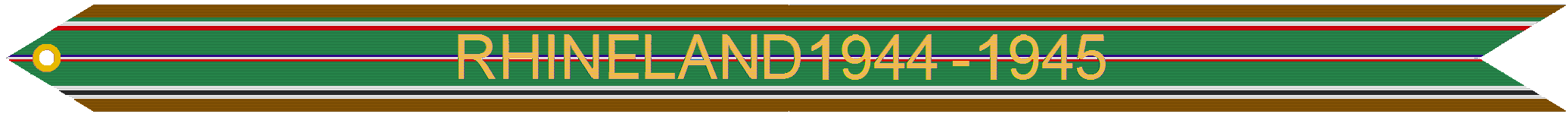

- Ardennes-Alsace

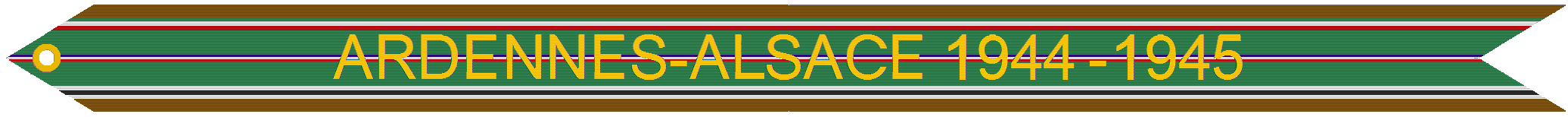

- Central Europe

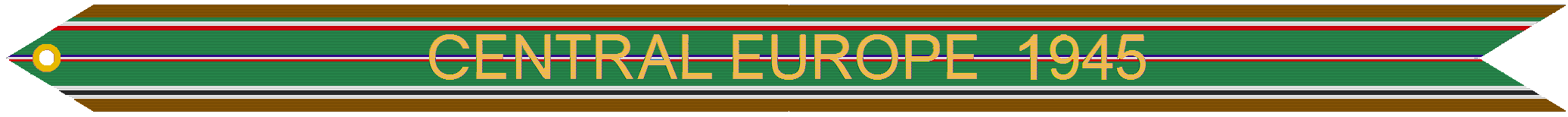

- Company A (Essex Troop-Newark), Company B (Newark), and Company D (Jersey City), 2nd Battalion, each additionally entitled to: World War II-EAMEC and Normandy (with arrowhead)

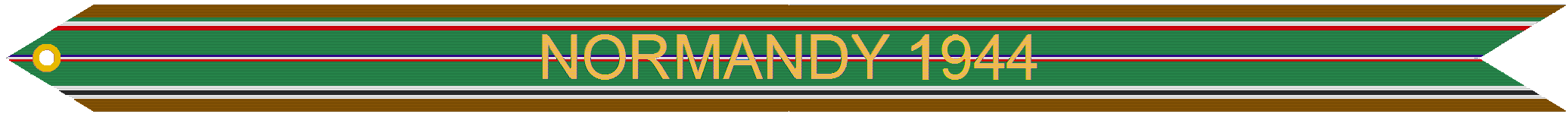

- Company C (Woodbridge), 2d Battalion, additionally entitled to: World War II-AP and Aleutian Islands

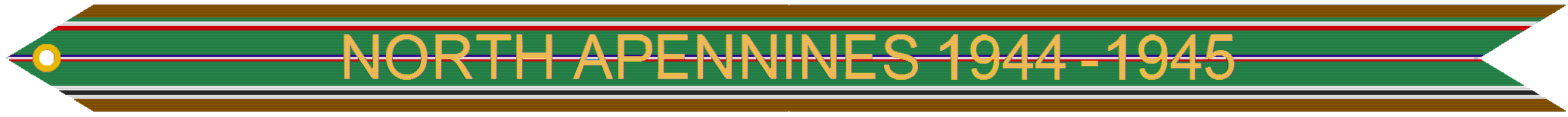

=== War on Terrorism ===
- Phase 5: Iraqi Surge

- Phase 6: Iraqi Sovereignty

- HHC, 2D BATTALION,113TH INFANTRY REGIMENT(Riverdale), Company A (Newark), Company B (Jersey City), Company C (Woodbridge), Company F 250th BSB (Teaneck), **attached** Troop A,(Dover) 1st Squadron, 102d Cavalry Regiment

The Iraq Campaign Streamer is added to the 2/113 Infantry Battalion's Guidon on 22 January.

== Decorations ==
War on Terrorism

- HHC, 2D BATTALION,113TH INFANTRY REGIMENT(Riverdale), and Troop A,(Dover) 1st Squadron, 102d Cavalry Regiment each entitled to Meritorious Unit Commendation (MUC) Iraq Service.

(GENERAL ORDERS NO. 2014–12 28 May 2014)

World War II

- Company A (Essex Troop-Newark), 2nd Battalion, entitled to: French Croix de Guerre with Palm and World War II and Streamer embroidered BEACHES OF NORMANDY
- Belgium Fourrangere 1940
- Cited in the Order of the Day of the Belgian Army for action in Belgium
- Cited in the Order of the Day of the Belgian Army for action in the Ardennes
- Company B (Newark) and Company D (Jersey City), 2nd Battalion, each entitled to: French Croix de Guerre with Palm and World War II and Streamer embroidered BEACHES OF NORMANDY

== Distinctive unit insignia ==
- Description

A Gold color metal and enamel device 1 1/8 inches (2.9 cm) in height overall consisting of a shield blazoned: Azure, a saltire Argent, in chief an oak tree eradicated of the last. Attached above the shield from a wreath Argent and Azure, a lion's head erased Or collared four fusils Gules. Attached below and to the sides of the shield a Gold scroll inscribed "FIDELIS ET FORTIS" in Black letters.

- Symbolism

The shield is blue for the Infantry; the white saltire cross commemorates the service of the old regiment in the Civil War and the silver oak tree the service in World War I (Argonne Forest). The motto is the motto of the old 1st New Jersey Infantry and translates to "Faithful and Brave."

- Background

The distinctive unit insignia was originally approved for the 113th Infantry Regiment on 26 March 1925. It was amended to include the motto on 22 July 1925. It was redesignated for the 113th Armored Infantry Battalion on 5 July 1952. The insignia was redesignated for the 113th Infantry Regiment and amended to include the State crest on 5 June 1961.

== Coat of arms ==
=== Blazon ===
- Shield

Azure, a saltire Argent, in chief an oak tree eradicated of the last. Attached above the shield from a wreath Argent and Azure, a lion's head erased Or collared four fusils Gules.

- Crest

That for the regiments and separate battalions of the New Jersey Army National Guard: On a wreath of the colors Argent and Azure, a lion's head erased Or collared four fusils Gules. Motto: FIDELIS ET FORTIS (Faithful and Brave).

=== Symbolism ===
- Shield

The shield is blue for the Infantry; the white saltire cross commemorates the service of the old regiment in the Civil War and the silver oak tree the service in World War I (Argonne Forest).

- Crest

The crest is that of the New Jersey Army National Guard.

=== Background ===
The coat of arms was originally approved for the 113th Infantry Regiment on 26 March 1925. It was redesignated for the 113th Armored Infantry Battalion on 5 July 1952. It was redesignated for the 113th Infantry Regiment on 5 June 1961.
