= USS Madawaska =

Two ships of the United States Navy have been named USS Madawaska, after Madawaska, Maine, a town in northern Aroostook County, on the Canadian border:

- USS Madawaska (1865) was a screw steamer, later renamed USS Tennessee in 1869.
- USS Madawaska (ID-3011), the former SS König Wilhelm II of the Hamburg America Line; served as a U.S. Navy transport in World War I; transferred to the United States Army as USAT Madawaska and, later, USAT U.S. Grant; transferred back to U.S. Navy in 1940 and served as USS U. S. Grant (AP-29) throughout World War II.
