= Freehold, New Jersey =

Freehold, New Jersey may refer to:

- Freehold Borough, New Jersey, the county seat of Monmouth County
- Freehold Township, New Jersey, the much larger township that surrounds the borough
