= 112th Field Artillery Regiment =

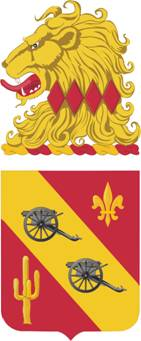
- Coat of arms
- Country: United States
- Branch: New Jersey Army National Guard
- Type: Field Artillery
- Nickname: FIRST NEW JERSEY ARTILLERY
- Patron: Saint Barbara
- Motto: "A Outrance" (To The Almost )

Commanders
- Current Commander: Lieutenant Colonel Jessie Barnes
- Command Sergeant Major: CSM Angel Rosario

Insignia
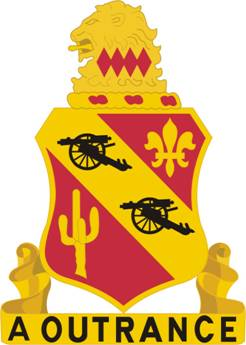
- Distinctive unit insignia

The 112th Field Artillery Regiment is a Field Artillery Branch regiment of the New Jersey Army National Guard first formed in April 1917. In December 1941, it was the last field artillery regiment in the U.S. Army to convert from horse-drawn to truck-drawn howitzers.

Only the 3rd Battalion of the 112th Field Artillery Regiment is currently active. Headquartered in Morristown, NJ, it is the Direct Support FA Battalion for the 44th Infantry Brigade Combat Team. Headquarters Battery, Battery A, and Company F, 250th Brigade Support Battalion (the battalion's Forward Support Company) are also located in Morristown. Battery B is located in Flemington, Battery C is in Toms River, and the Fire Support Detachment is located in Freehold. 3-112 FAR is a M119A3 and M777A2-equipped composite FA battalion. As noted below the 112th Field Artillery Regiment was organized 3 April 1917 in the New Jersey National Guard from new and existing units as the 1st Battalion, Field Artillery, with Headquarters at Camden. However its lineage goes back to 2 formations formed in March 1776: Eastern Division of New Jersey Artillery [Colonel Thomas Proctor's Regiment of Artillery of the Continental Army] and the Western Division of New Jersey Artillery; both units served in the American Revolution. After 141 years of separation it wasn't until 1916 that both formations were re-united in one unit: Battery B [Western] Battery C [Eastern] with the 112th Field Artillery Regiment

== History ==
- Organized 3 April 1917 in the New Jersey National Guard from new and existing units as the 1st Battalion, Field Artillery, with headquarters at Camden
- Expanded, reorganized, and redesignated 17 July 1917 as the 1st Field Artillery Drafted into federal service 5 August 1917
- Reorganized and redesignated 15 September 1917 as the 110th Field Artillery and assigned to the 29th Division
- Redesignated 27 September 1917 as the 112th Field Artillery and remained assigned to the 29th Division
- Demobilized 31 May 1919 at Camp Dix, New Jersey
- Reorganized 1920–1921 in the New Jersey National Guard as the 1st Battalion, Field Artillery; Headquarters federally recognized 27 June 1921 at East Orange
- Expanded, reorganized, and redesignated 20 April 1922 as the 112th Field Artillery and assigned to the 44th Division; Headquarters federally recognized 8 January 1924 at Camden. Location of headquarters changed 10 May 1929 to Trenton.
- 2d Battalion redesignated 14 June 1936 as the 1st Battalion, 157th Field Artillery, an element of the 44th Division – see ANNEX 1; new 2d Battalion organized and Federally recognized 1 July 1936 with Headquarters at Trenton
- 1st Battalion redesignated 1 December 1939 as the 1st Battalion, 165th Field Artillery, an element of the 44th Division-see ANNEX 2; new 1st Battalion concurrently organized from the former 1st Battalion, 165th Field Artillery [organized and federally recognized 15 November 1939 in the New Jersey National Guard with headquarters at Morristown])
- Relieved 25 April 1940 from assignment to the 44th Division and assigned to the 21st Cavalry Division
- Relieved 1 October 1940 from assignment to the 21st Cavalry Division and assigned to the General Headquarters Reserve
- Inducted into federal service 27 January 1941 at home stations
- Regiment broken up l May 1943 and its elements reorganized and redesignated as follows:
- Headquarters and the 1st Battalion as the 695th Field Artillery Battalion 2d Battalion as the 696th Field Artillery Battalion (Headquarters Battery as Headquarters and Headquarters Battery, 112th Field Artillery Group - hereafter separate lineage)
- After 1 May 1943 the above units underwent changes as follows: 695th Field Artillery Battalion reorganized and redesignated 26 August 1943 as the 695th Armored Field Artillery Battalion Inactivated 2 November 1945 at Camp Myles Standish, Massachusetts Reorganized and federally recognized 17 December 1946 with headquarters at Morristown
- 696th Field Artillery Battalion reorganized and redesignated 26 August 1943 as the 696th Armored Field Artillery Battalion
- Inactivated 27 October 1945 at Camp Patrick Henry, Virginia
- Reorganized and federally recognized 24 September 1946 with headquarters at Trenton
- Ordered into active federal service 3 September 1950 at home stations
- (695th Armored Field Artillery Battalion [NGUS] organized and federally recognized 10 November 1952 with headquarters at Morristown
- Released 17 December 1954 from active federal service and reverted to state control; federal recognition concurrently withdrawn from the 695th Armored Field Artillery Battalion [NGUS]
- 695th and 696th Armored Field Artillery Battalions consolidated 1 March 1959 with the 228th (see ANNEX 1), 199th (see ANNEX 2), 157th (see ANNEX 3), and 286th (see ANNEX 4) Armored Field Artillery Battalions to form the 112th Artillery, a parent regiment under the Combat Arms Regimental System, to consist of the 1st, 2d, and 3d Howitzer Battalions and the 4th Rocket Howitzer Battalion, elements of the 50th Armored Division, and the 5th and 6th Howitzer Battalions
- Reorganized 31 January 1963 to consist of the 1st, 2d, 3d, 4th, and 6th Battalions, elements of the 50th Armored Division, and the 5th Howitzer Battalion
- Reorganized 15 March 1966 to consist of the 1st, 2d, 3d, 4th, and 6th Battalions, elements of the 50th Armored Division, the 5th Howitzer Battalion, and the 7th Battalion
- Reorganized 1 February 1968 to consist of the 3d, 4th, and 6th Battalions, elements of the 50th Armored Division, and the 1st, 5th, and 7th Battalions
- Reorganized 1 December 1971 to consist of the 3d, 4th, and 6th Field Artillery Battalions, elements of the 50th Armored Division, and the 1st, 5th, and 7th Battalions
- Reorganized in April 1972 to consist of the 3d, 4th, and 6th Field Artillery Battalions, elements of the 50th Armored Division, and the 1st and 5th Battalions
- Redesignated 1 May 1972 as the 112th Field Artillery
- Reorganized 1 May 1975 to consist of the 3d and 4th Battalions, elements of the 50th Armored Division, and the 1st and 5th Battalions
- Reorganized 1 July.1975 to consist of the 1st, 3d, 4th, and 5th Battalions, elements of the 50th Armored Division
- Reorganized 1 May 1980 to consist of the 1st, 3d, and 4th Battalions, elements of the 50th Armored Division
- Withdrawn 1 June 1989 from the Combat Arms Regimental System and reorganized under the United States Army Regimental System
- Reorganized 1 September 1991 to consist of the 1st and 3d Battalions, elements of the 50th Armored Division
- Reorganized 1 September 1993 to consist of the 1st and 3d Battalions, elements of the 42d Infantry Division
- Reorganized 1 September 1997 to consist of the 3d Battalion and Battery D, elements of the 42d Infantry Division
- Battery D ordered into active federal service 26 May 2003 at Cherry Hill; released from active federal service 24 May 2004 and reverted to state control
- Redesignated 1 October 2005 as the 112th Field Artillery Regiment
- Reorganized 1 March 2008 to consist of the 3rd Battalion, an element of the 50th Infantry Combat Team
- Ordered into active federal service 16 June 2008 at home stations; released from active federal service 20 July and reverted to state control

=== Annex 1 ===
- 1st Battalion, 157th Field Artillery, inducted into federal service 16 September 1940 at home stations Redesignated 20 February 1942 as the 1st Battalion, 228th Field Artillery, and relieved from assignment to the 44th Division
- Reorganized and redesignated 1 March 1943 as the 228th Field Artillery Battalion Inactivated 27 October 1945 at Camp Myies Standish, Massachusetts
- Redesignated 5 July 1946 as the 228th Armored Field Artillery Battalion and assigned to the 50th Armored Division
- Reorganized and federally recognized 31 October 1946 at Camden

=== Annex 2 ===
- 1st Battalion, 165th Field Artillery, inducted Into federal service 16 September 1940 at home stations Reorganized and redesignated 20 February 1942 as the 199th Field Artillery Battalion and relieved from assignment to the 44th Division
- Inactivated 23 October 1945 at Camp Shanks, New York
- Redesignated 5 July 1946 as the 199th Armored Field Artillery Battalion and assigned to the 50th Armored Division
- Reorganized and federally recognized 26 November 1945 with headquarters at East Orange

=== Annex 3 ===
- Organized and federally recognized 8 June 1936 in the New Jersey National Guard as the 2d Battalion, 157th Field Artillery, an element of the 44th Division, with headquarters at Atlantic City Inducted into federal service 16 September 1940 at home stations
- Disbanded 7 January 1941 at Fort Dix, New Jersey
- Reconstituted 25 August 1945 In the New Jersey National Guard as the 2d Battalion, 157th Field Artillery
- Redesignated 9 July 1946 as the 157th Field Artillery Battalion
- Reorganized and federally recognized 12 February 1947 with headquarters at Atlantic City
- Reorganized and redesignated l October 1954 as the 157th Armored Field Artillery Battalion

=== Annex 4 ===
- Constituted 9 July 1946 in the New Jersey National Guard as the 308th Antiaircraft Artillery Searchlight Battalion Redesignated 1 December 1947 as the 308th Antiaircraft Artillery Gun Battalion
- Organized and federally recognized 9 January 1950 with headquarters at Rio Grande
- Redesignated l October 1953 as the 308th Antiaircraft Artillery Battalion
- Converted and redesignated l February 1955 as the 286th Armored Field Artillery

== Campaign participation credit ==
=== World War I ===
- Streamer without inscription

=== World War II ===
- Normandy;
- Northern France;
- Rhineland;
- Ardennes-Alsace;
- Central Europe

Headquarters Battery (Morristown) and Battery A (Morristown), 3d Battalion, each additionally entitled to:

=== World War I ===
- Meuse-Argonne
- Alsace 1918

War on Terrorism: Campaigns to be determined

== Decorations ==
- Presidential Unit Citation (Army)
- Streamer embroidered MOSELLE RIVER Headquarters Battery (Morristown) and Battery A (Morristown)

3d Battalion, each additionally entitled to:

- Presidential Unit Citation (Army)
- Streamer embroidered SCHALBACH Battery B (Lawrenceville)

3d Battalion, additionally entitled to:

- French Croix de Guerre with Palm
- World War II
- Streamer embroidered MOSELLE RIVER
