= List of emergency and first responder agencies that responded to the September 11 attacks =

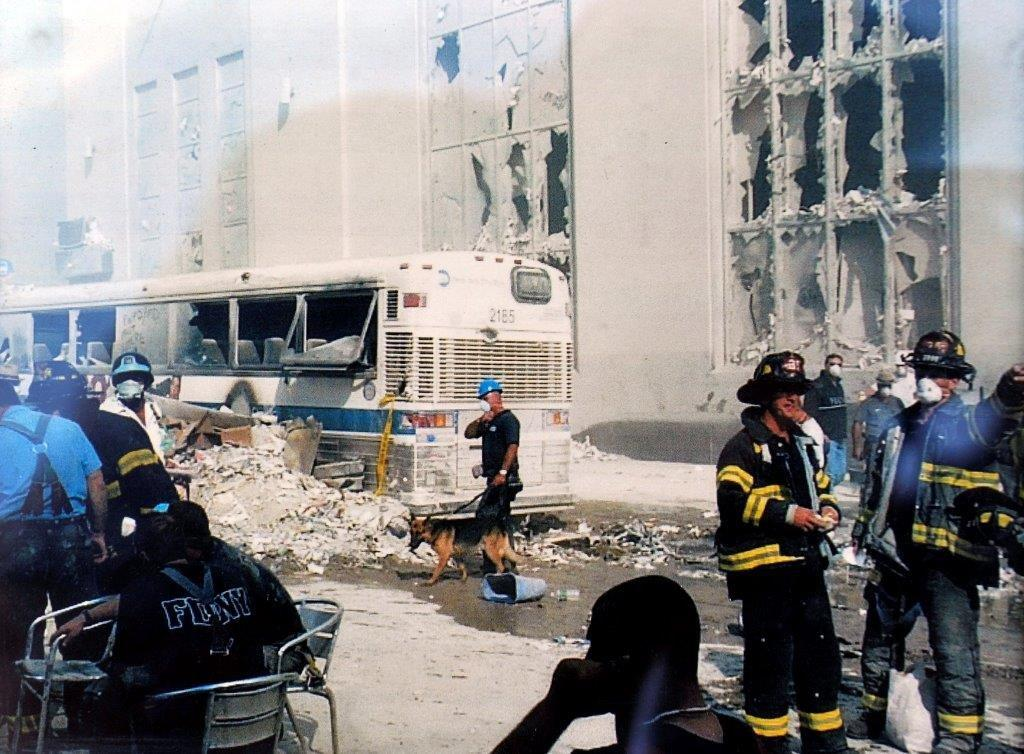
First Responders at the World Trade Center

This article is a list of the emergency and first responder agencies that responded to the September 11 attacks against the United States, on September 11, 2001. This list generally only lists those agencies that were part of the first response on 9/11.

These agencies responded during and after the attack and were part of the search-and-rescue, security, firefighting, clean-up, investigation, evacuation, support and traffic control on September 11.

== World Trade Center, New York City, September 11 ==
This list is a list of emergency services, first responder agencies and organisations that responded to the terrorist attack at the original World Trade Center in New York City.

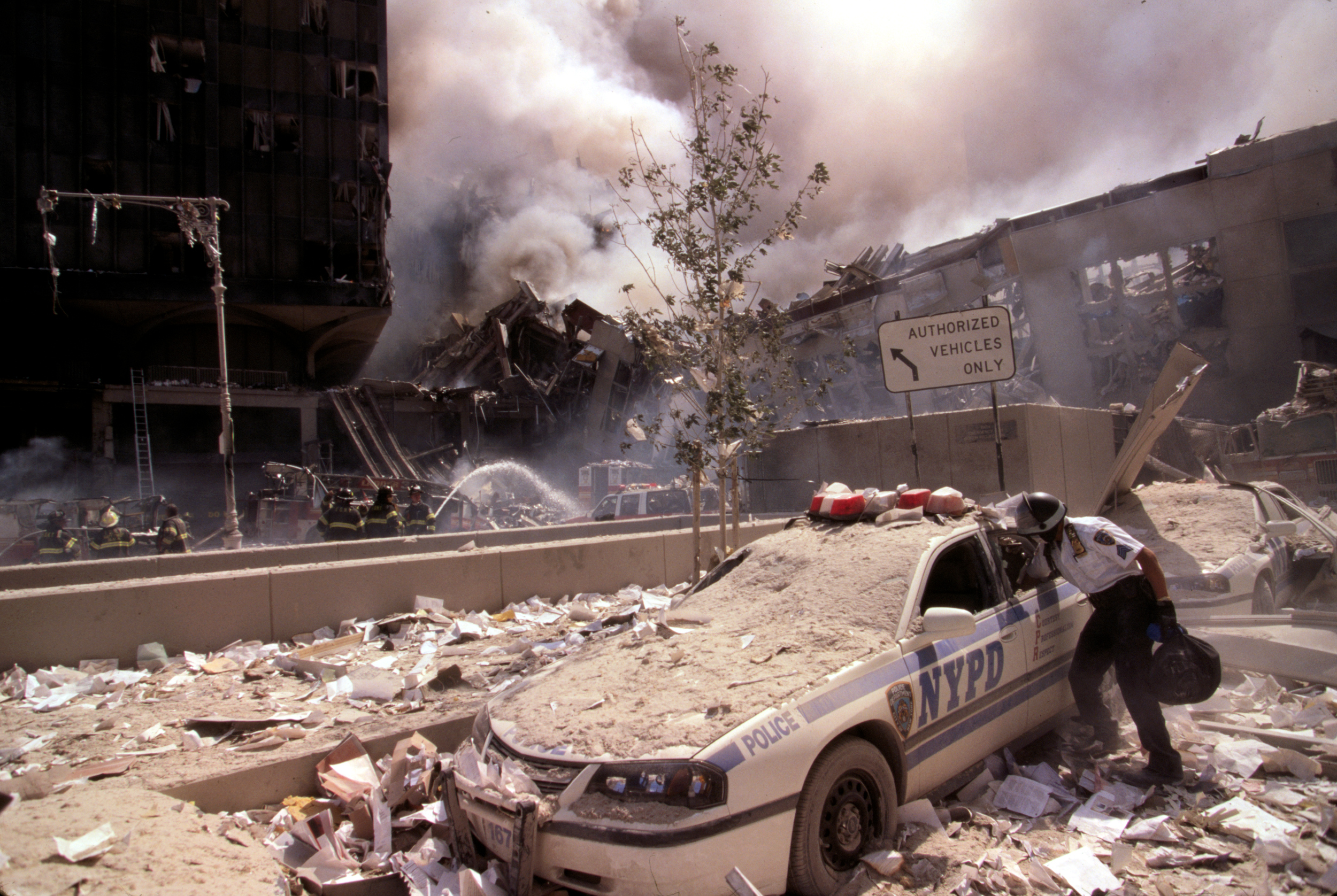
A Police Sergeant reaching into a New York Police Department car covered with debris

At least 10 law enforcement agencies responded to the terrorist attacks at the WTC. There were many losses from these agencies:

- One retired New Jersey Army National Guard warrant officer was killed when United Flight 93 crashed into a field in Shanksville, Pennsylvania
- 72 law enforcement officers were killed when the two WTC buildings collapsed
- Hundreds more have passed away in the years following 2001 as the direct result of illnesses contracted while working in hazardous conditions in New York, Pennsylvania, and Virginia.

This is a list of the law enforcement agencies (Federal, State and Local) that responded on 9/11.

=== State and Local Police agencies ===
==== Bi-state Agencies ====
- Port Authority Police Department (PAPD) - the WTC was owned by the Port Authority and had a large PAPD presence on the day - thirty-seven members of the PAPD were lost on the day.

==== NYC Agencies ====
- New York City Parks Enforcement Patrol (PEP) - The PEP responded with several officers and assisted with traffic control, manning checkpoints and escorting people out of the area.
- New York City Police Department (NYPD) - the NYPD was one of the major first responders and lost twenty-three officers on the day.
- New York City Sheriff - large response by the NYC Sheriff, who helped with evacuations, traffic control and scene control
- New York City Department of Corrections (NYCD) - ESU officers responded to the WTC.
- New York City Department of Sanitation Environmental Police - responded and assisted at the WTC attacks.
- City University of New York Public Safety Department - responded in patrol vehicles

==== NYS Agencies ====
- New York State Court Officers - NY State Court Officers (sworn peace officers) responded and helped with evacuations at the WTC. Three officers were lost on the day.
- New York State Department of Taxation and Finance - Revenue Crimes Bureau - lost five members whilst attempting to rescue people
- New York State Department of Taxation and Finance - Petroleum, Alcohol and Tobacco Bureau - lost 1 Chief on 9/11, who responded to the emergency.
- New York State Police (NYSP) - Troopers from the NYSP responded on 9/11, including elements of the Mobile Response Team / SWAT & K9 teams.
- New York State Park Police - Responded from State Park stations shortly after 9:03 AM. Assisted with traffic control
- New York State Department of Environmental Conservation Police - Assisted with evacuation and search and recovery efforts.
- American Society for the Prevention of Cruelty to Animals Humane Law Enforcement, New York (ASPCA) - Special Investigators from the ASPCA's Humane Law Enforcement division were assigned to search for abandoned animals in homes and apartments in restricted area around the World Trade Center site that had been evacuated. One investigator died later after the attacks.
- Metropolitan Transportation Authority Police Department (MTA Police) - Responded and assisted with evacuation and logistics management efforts during the attacks
- Triborough Bridge and Tunnel Authority Law Enforcement Division - Assisted with traffic control
- NYC Organized Crime Control Commission (now known as the NYC Business Integrity Commission) - Responded and assisted at the WTC on the morning of 9/11 as well as in the search and recovery efforts that followed. Also investigated attempts of organized crime groups seeking to misappropriate the scrap steel salvaged from the Pile.

==== Federal Law Enforcement agencies ====
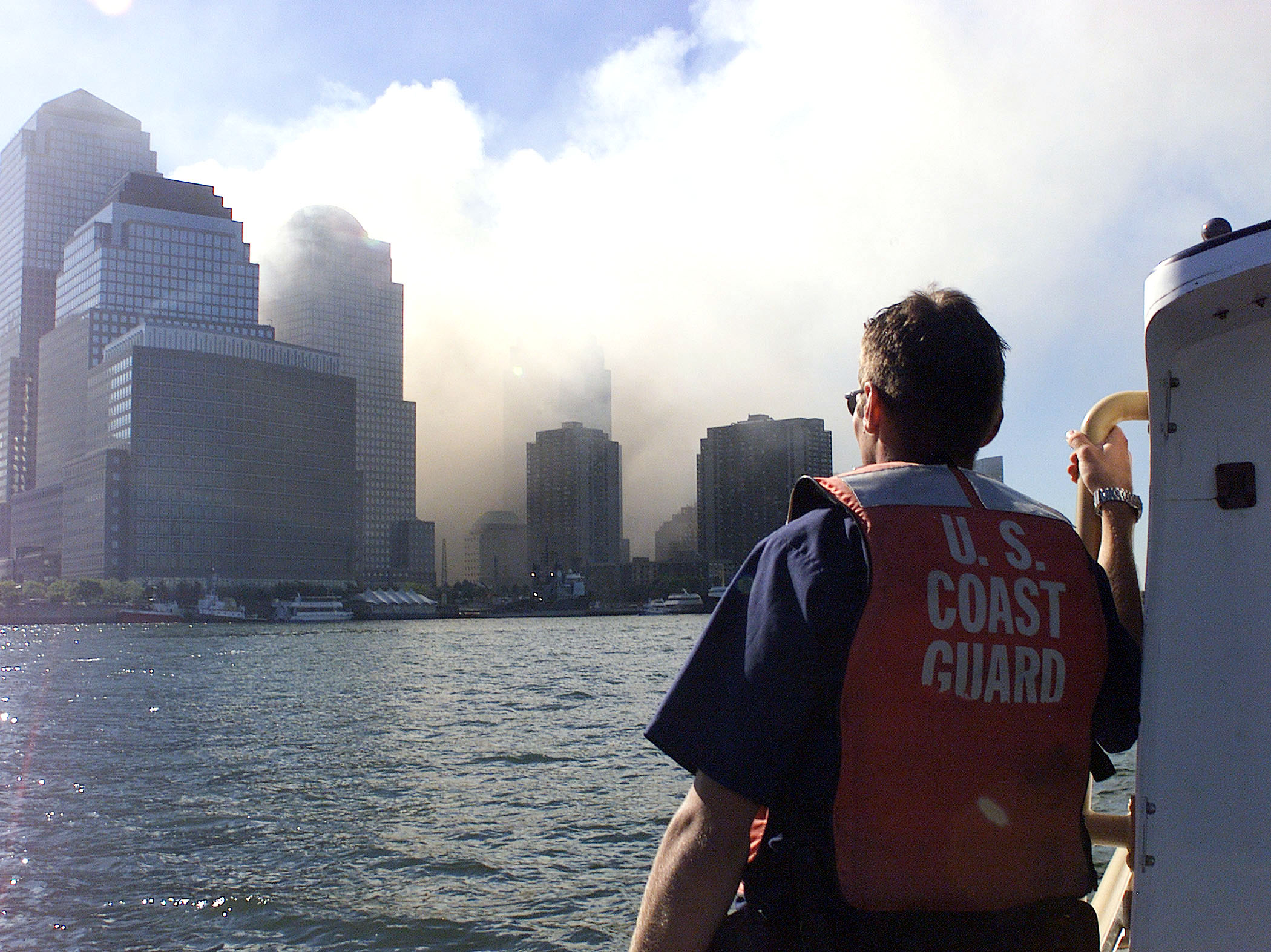
United States Coast Guard boat patrolling the New York Harbor with the impact area of World Trade Center in sight, September 11, 2001.

- Federal Bureau of Investigation (FBI) - Assisted with evacuation, search and rescue, recovery and led the criminal investigation into the September 11 attacks.
- US Customs Service - The US Customs Service had a post of 760 officers at the US Customs House in WTC Tower 6 and officers responded to the attacks.
- US Postal Inspection Service (USPIS) - US Postal Inspectors helped with the recovery efforts and removed the mail from nearby US Post Office to safety.
- US Secret Service (USSS) - assisted with rescue efforts and site control. One Special Agent was based at the World Trade Center field office and died on 9/11.
- Bureau of Alcohol, Tobacco, Firearms and Explosives (ATF) - Bureau of Alcohol, Tobacco, Firearms and Explosives arrived shortly after the north tower was hit and assisted in the evacuation of civilians.
- United States Marshals Service (USMS) - Assisted with evacuation and emergency response on 9/11.
- Federal Protective Service (FPS) (when part of the GSA) responded to the attack and helped with evacuation and emergency response.
- Drug Enforcement Administration (DEA) - Assisted with evacuation and traffic/crowd control.
- Amtrak Police Department - Responded from the Bronx and assisted with crowd/traffic control & evacuation during the attack

==== Out of city and state agencies ====
- New Rochelle Police Department (NY)
- Suffolk County Sheriff’s Office (NY)
- New Jersey State Police

=== Fire Departments and Rescue agencies ===
- New York City Fire Department (FDNY) - large response from FDNY. The Department lost 343 members on 9/11.
- New York Fire Patrol (FPNY) - the New York [City] Fire Patrol responded with members assisting the FDNY with rescue and recovery. The Patrol lost 1 member on 9/11.
- New Rochelle Fire Department (New Rochelle, New York) - Chief of Department and an engine, ladder, and heavy rescue responded directly to Ground Zero after the collapse of the North Tower.
- Indiana Rescue Task Force - deployed the Indiana Task Force 1 (ITF-1), which were a group of firefighters from various Indiana Fire/Rescue departments and agencies. They arrived on September 12.
- Arundel Volunteer Fire Department - responded from Maryland to assist with rescue and recovery
- Eureka Fire-Rescue - Responded from Tarentum Pennsylvania with an ALS ambulance and Heavy Rescue to provide technical rescue services
- Elizabeth Fire Department- Staged on Staten Island and then brought over by ferry. Credited by news papers for helping in the rescue of two PAPD officers and two FDNY firefighters.
- Islip Volunteer Fire Department (Suffolk County, New York) - Sent one Tactical Rescue Unit to New York City to assist with rescue and recovery.
- Farmingville Volunteer Fire Department (Suffolk County, New York) - Sent one Engine to New York City to assist with rescue and recovery. The famous photograph "Walk of Courage" by Robert McMahan shows members of Engine 5-18-2 walking down a dusty street.
- Hauppauge Fire Department, NY - provided mutual aid support to the recovery efforts. Lost two members on 9/11.
- West Hamilton Beach Fire Department - volunteer fire department, NYC
- Broad Channel Volunteer Fire Department- volunteer fire department, NYC
- Garden City Park Fire Department- volunteer fire department. 1 Line Of Duty Death from September 11 2001 response.
- Edgewater Park Volunteer Hose Company - volunteer fire department, NYC
- Richmond Engine Company #1 - volunteer fire department, NYC
- Oceanic Hook and Ladder Company #1 volunteer fire department, NYC
- Dunellen Defender Fire Company #1 volunteer fire department, Dunellen, NJ
- Milltown Fire Department (Ladder 73)
- Aviation Volunteer Hose Co. #3 - volunteer fire department, NYC (now disbanded)
- Jersey City Fire Department Only NJ Fire Department that received an official call for help from the FDNY.
- Newark Fire Department Newark Firefighters went to the scene via a Police Athletic League Bus and a Ferry despite direct orders from Dispatchers that any Firefighter who stepped foot in Manhattan would be terminated.
- Longport Fire Department, NJ The Longport Fire Department responded to 9/11 in their Fire Engine. A photo of them can be found in their fire station near their Fire Boat.
- Sterling Volunteer Fire Company (SVFC) – Engine 611, Engine 618, and Tower 611, Loudoun County, VA. - Members from the SVFC also responded to New York City in the to support search, rescue and recovery efforts, after responding to the crash at the Pentagon.
- Rye Fire Department, Westchester County, NY - Engine 191 spent 2 days at ground zero while Ladder 26 was on standby at a FDNY firehouse in the Bronx.
- Syosset Volunteer Fire Department - Provided mutual aid support and multiple volunteers to help the rescue effort.

=== Emergency Medical Services (EMS) ===
Many different emergency medical services responded to the WTC. This included the FDNY EMS, as well as numerous hospitals, volunteer ambulances/EMS and commercial EMS companies.

Although FDNY EMS was the main emergency medical responder, it was supplemented by more than 50 voluntary hospital ambulance services and private companies. At least 400 EMS personnel responded to the WTC. Eight EMTs and paramedics were among the 2,973 people who died.

Members showed immense bravery and carried out many duties, including:

- first aid and triage of casualties
- transportation to numerous hospitals
- assisting injured first responders, from the initial response.

Some of these agencies are listed below:

==== Fire Department and Public EMS ====
- FDNY EMS responded, as part of the FDNY (see above section on Fire/Rescue)2 paramedics lost.
- Lebanon Township First Aid Squad - from Lebanon Township, New Jersey sent at least one ambulance
- Port Authority JFK Airport EMS

==== Commercial Ambulance Companies ====
- Citywide Ambulance (NYC)
- American Medical Response (AMR)
- Erway Ambulance Service (Chemung County NY)
- McCabe Ambulance EMS - the director of this EMS from Hudson County New Jersey, responded himself to the WTC and assisted with evacuation and triage
- Empress EMS (NY)
- Midwood Ambulance Service (Brooklyn)
- Century One EMS

==== Voluntary and Hospital EMS and Community-Based Ambulances ====
- New York Presbyterian Emergency Medical Services - lost 2 members on 9/11.
- Center for Emergency Medical Services-Northshore University Hospital, Provided 12 units, staffing, Rescue and Medical Equipment
- Cabrini Hospital Emergency Medical Services (NYC) - lost 1 member on 9/11.
- Maimonides Medical Center Emergency Medical Services
- Bellmore-Merrick Emergency Medical Services - a volunteer EMS from Bellmore, New York
- Jersey City Medical Center (NJ) - lost 1 member on 9/11.
- Saint Vincent's Catholic Medical Centers (SVCMC) - sent ambulances to the WTC and acted as the primary admitting hospital for the injured.
- Brighton Volunteer Ambulance
- Central Park Medical Unit Volunteer Ambulance
- Hatzolah volunteer Ambulance
- Forest Hills Volunteer Ambulance Corps (NYC) - lost 1 member on 9/11.
- Fordham University EMS - Sent ambulance after receiving Mutual Aid Radio call.
- MetroCare Ambulance - lost 1 member (EMT) on 9/11.
- Hunter Ambulance - lost 1 member on 9/11.
- Bensonhurst volunteer ambulance service, sent 2 ambulances and 2 p.o.v.
- Teaneck Volunteer Ambulance Corps - a volunteer EMS agency from Teaneck, New Jersey
- Montville Township First Aid Squad - a volunteer EMS agency from Montville, New Jersey.
- Stony Point Ambulance - a volunteer EMS agency from Stony Point, New York
- Summit Volunteer First Aid Squad - 49 volunteers responded from home and work, from Summit, New Jersey, to Manhattan on the day and helped in the following days with recovery efforts
- Montclair State University EMS
- Lenox Hill Hospital Ambulance Services
- Flushing Hill Medical Center Ambulance Services
- Beth Israel Medical Center Ambulance Services
- Lutheran Medical Center of Brooklyn EMS
- Jamaica Hospital Medical Center
- NYU Medical Centre Downtown Hospital Paramedics
- Long Island College Hospital EMS
- Hackensack University Medical Center (NJ) Paramedics
- Victory Memorial Hospital (Brooklyn) EMS
- Valhalla EMS

=== Military and Federal Government agencies ===
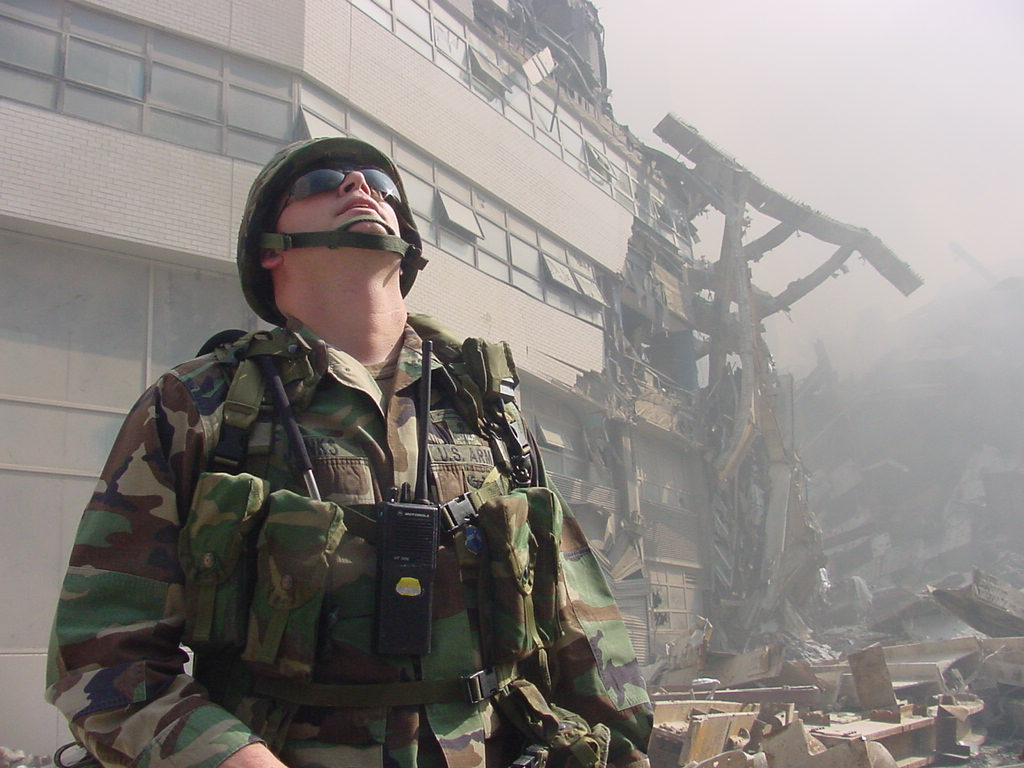
New York Army National Guard soldier on duty at "the Pile".

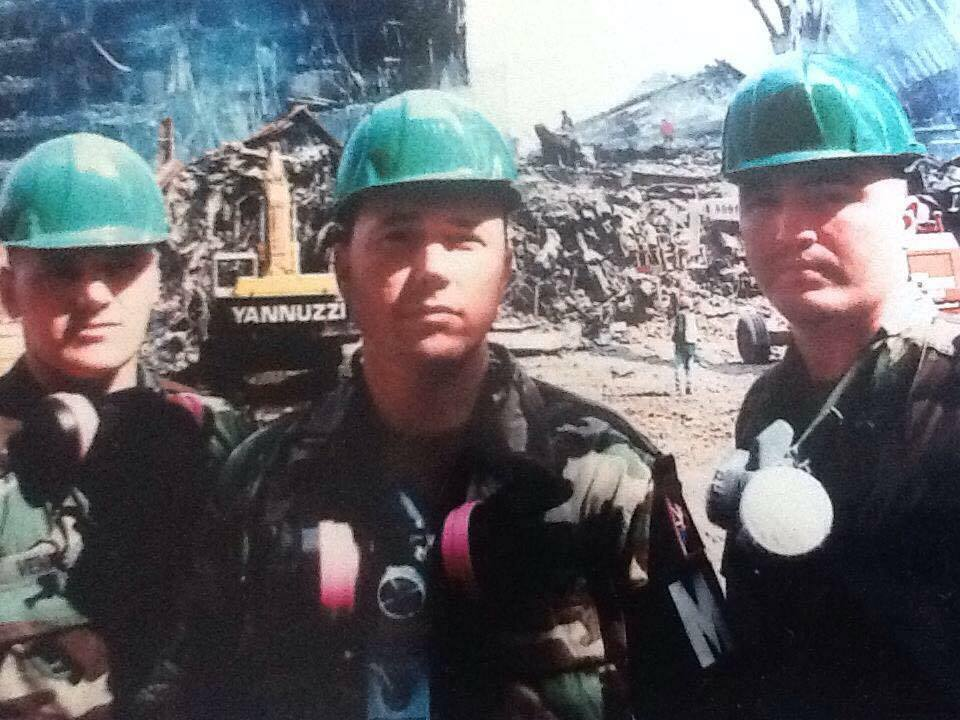
442nd Military Police Company - at WTC Ground Zero

- New York Air National Guard - The NY Air Guard had jets deployed over NYC after the attacks and Air Guard airmen were already staffing at the North East Air Defense Sector.
- New York Army National Guard - The 442nd Military Police Company and other units helped secure the scene after the attack, with the Guard manning cordons and assisting at 'the Pile'.
- New York Guard
- New York Naval Militia - responded with a maritime evacuation, assisting at 'the Pile'.
- United States Coast Guard - responded with a maritime evacuation, provided communications and security, assisted those in need. Operation Noble Eagle - deployed even more Coast Guard men and women on port security missions, search and rescue efforts, and clean-up operations. Thousands of Coast Guard Auxiliarists and reservists were mobilized in homeland defense and port security.
- United States Department of Energy-NSA-Special Technologies Lab, Santa Barbara, responded to the towers. Support persons were one of very few flights permitted in US airspace, following the attacks, all flights were grounded in the US. Lab staff were sent with sensitive experimental Ground Penetrating ground radar to search for survivors beneath the rubble and debris.
- 249th Engineer Battalion (Prime Power), United States Army Corps of Engineers, U.S. Army - deployed a Patrol Boat to help with rescue/recovery and helped restore power to Wall Street.
- New York Wing Civil Air Patrol
- National Transportation Safety Board
- New Jersey Army National Guard
- New Jersey Air National Guard
- New Jersey Naval Militia
- New Jersey Wing Civil Air Patrol

=== Other Emergency Service Agencies ===
- New York City Office of Emergency Management
- New York State Office of Emergency Management
- New York State Department of Environmental Conservation
- New York State Department of Transportation
- New York City Department of Transportation
- New York City Department of Environmental Protection
- New York Office of the Medical Examiner
- Metropolitan Transportation Authority
- American Red Cross
- Con Edison

== Pentagon, Arlington, September 11 ==
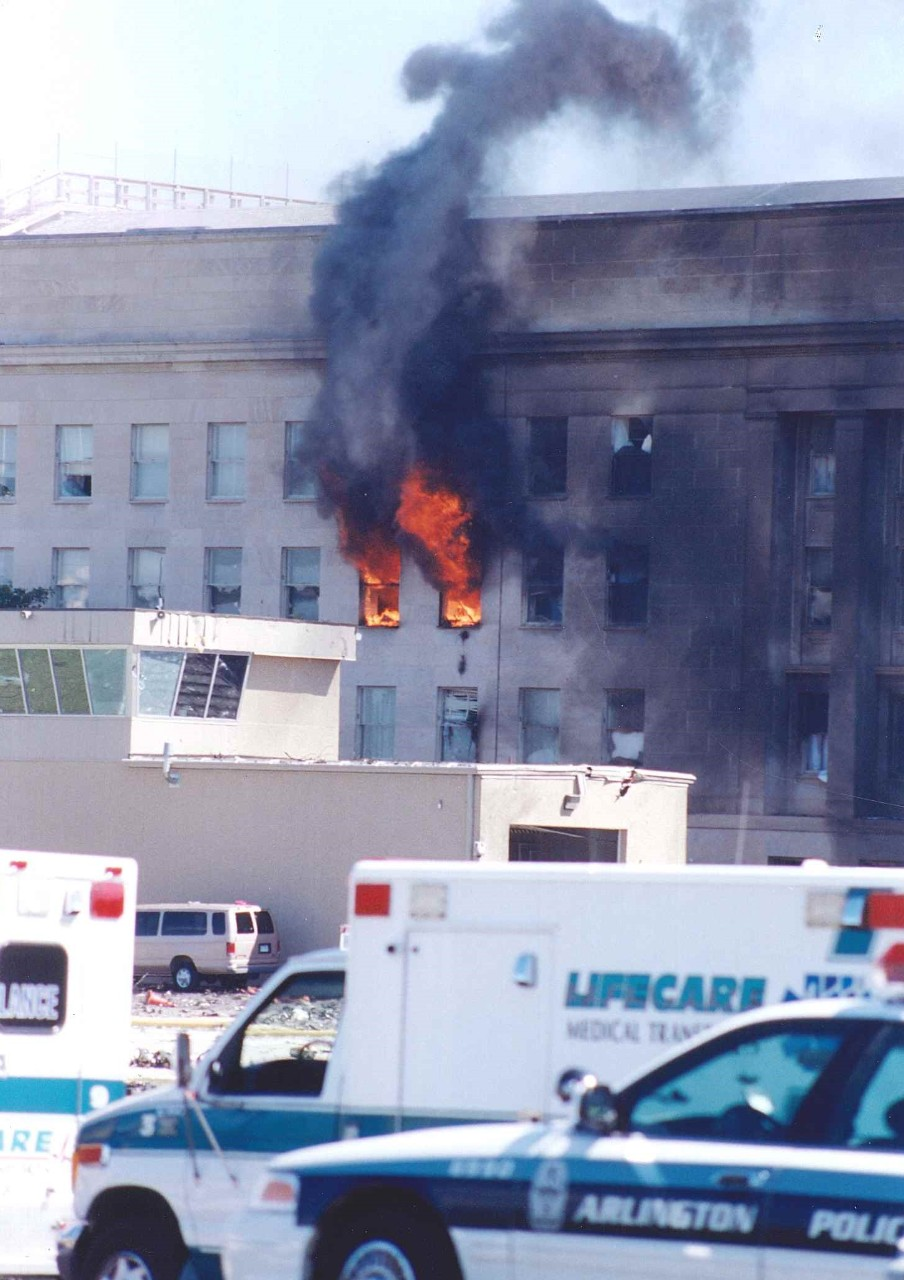
Police and EMS outside the burning Pentagon

This list is a list of emergency services, first responder agencies and organizations that responded to the crash of American Airlines Flight 77 at The Pentagon in Arlington County, Virginia, just outside of Washington, D.C.

=== Law enforcement agencies ===
==== State and Local Police agencies ====
- United States Pentagon Police
- Alexandria Police Department
- Arlington County Police Department, initiated traffic control in the vicinity of the Pentagon. Assisted in aiding people trapped in rubble.
- Virginia State Police, assisted in security of evidence and at the crash site.
- Metropolitan Police Department of the District of Columbia
- Metro Transit Police Department

==== Federal Law Enforcement agencies ====
- Federal Bureau of Investigation, secured aircraft parts and recovered evidence a mere thirty minutes after the attack occurred.
- United States Park Police, responded to the Pentagon, assisted in the evacuation Washington, and aided children at the Pentagon's daycare.
- U.S. Marshals Service, assisted in the security of evidence.
- Drug Enforcement Administration, helped aid people trapped in the rubble.
- Bureau of Alcohol, Tobacco, Firearms and Explosives, helped aid people trapped in the rubble.
- United States Secret Service
- United States Army Criminal Investigation Division
- Air Force Office of Special Investigations
- Naval Criminal Investigative Service
- Defense Protective Service

=== Fire, Rescue agencies ===
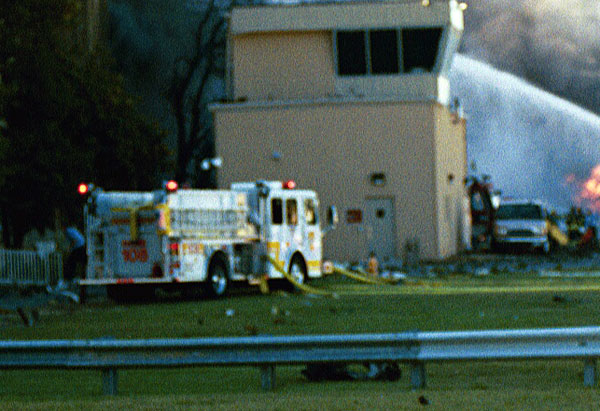
Arlington Engine 105 operating at the Pentagon shortly after the crash of Flight 77.

- Arlington County Fire Department, responded to the crash at the Pentagon.
- Alexandria Fire Department, responded to the crash at the Pentagon.
- Metropolitan Washington Airports Authority Fire Department, sent units from Reagan National Airport to the Pentagon.
- Sterling Volunteer Fire Company (SVFC) – Engine 611, Engine 618, and Tower 611, Loudoun County, VA. (www.sterlingfire.org) - As part of the Loudoun County Combined Fire Rescue System, the SVFC responded to the Pentagon for initial fire suppression, search and recovery, and provided coverage for Fairfax County Fire Rescue Stations In the early hours and subsequent days. Members from the SVFC also responded to New York City in the immediate days following to support search, rescue and recovery efforts.
- District of Columbia Fire and Emergency Medical Services Department
- Fairfax County Fire and Rescue Department
- Fort Myer Military Community Fire Department
- Fort Belvoir Fire Department

=== Emergency Medical Services (EMS) ===
- Virginia Hospital Center - Arlington, treated victims
- Inova Fairfax Hospital, treated victims
- Washington Hospital Center, treated victims
- American Medical Response (AMR)

=== Military and Federal Government agencies ===
- National Park Service, park rangers from across the National Capitol Region were sent to secure Camp David and regional sites.
- Environmental Protection Agency, helped aid people trapped in the rubble.
- Federal Emergency Management Agency
- Department of Defense, target of the attack.
- District of Columbia Army National Guard, responded to the attack at the Pentagon
- District of Columbia Air National Guard, fighter jets from Langley Air Force Base, operated air patrols over D.C. airspace.
- Virginia Army National Guard
- Virginia Air National Guard
- Virginia Defense Force
- National Transportation Safety Board
- National Capital Wing Civil Air Patrol
- Virginia Wing Civil Air Patrol

=== Other Emergency Service Agencies ===
- Washington Metropolitan Area Transit Authority, aided the Arlington County Fire Department in the transportation of firefighters.
- Virginia Department of Emergency Management

== Shanksville, Pennsylvania, September 11 ==
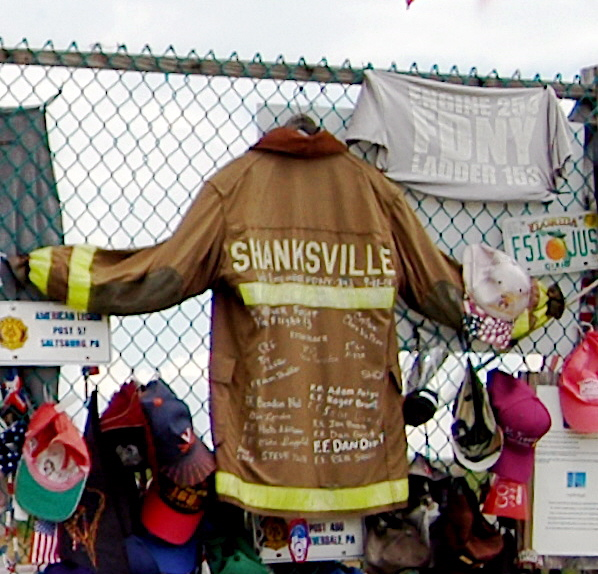
Shanksville Volunteer Firefighter Coat at the Flight 93 temporary national memorial.

This list is a list of emergency services, first responder agencies and organizations that responded to the crash site of the failed hijacking of United Flight 93 in Stonycreek Township, Somerset County, Pennsylvania, just outside Shanksville, Pennsylvania.

=== Law enforcement agencies ===
70 agencies responded to the crash at Shanksville.

==== State and Local Police agencies ====
- Pennsylvania State Police
- Somerset County Sheriff's Department

==== Federal Law Enforcement agencies ====
- Federal Bureau of Investigation - Pittsburgh

=== Fire, Rescue agencies ===
- Shanksville Volunteer Fire Department

=== Emergency Medical Services (EMS) ===
- Somerset County Coroners Office

=== Military and Federal Government agencies ===
- Pennsylvania Army National Guard
- Pennsylvania Air National Guard
- National Transportation Safety Board
- Pennsylvania Wing Civil Air Patrol

=== Other Emergency Service Agencies ===
- Salvation Army
- American Red Cross
- Pennsylvania Emergency Management Agency
- Pennsylvania Department of Environmental Protection

== See also ==
- Rescue and recovery effort after the September 11 attacks on the World Trade Center
- September 11 attacks
- YouTube video link to the EMS Citywide Radio Broadcasts (external link)
- Terrorism in the United States
- New York metropolitan area
- Washington, D.C.
- Law enforcement in New York (state)
