= National Guard Militia Museum of New Jersey =

Coordinates: 40°7′39″N 74°2′30″W

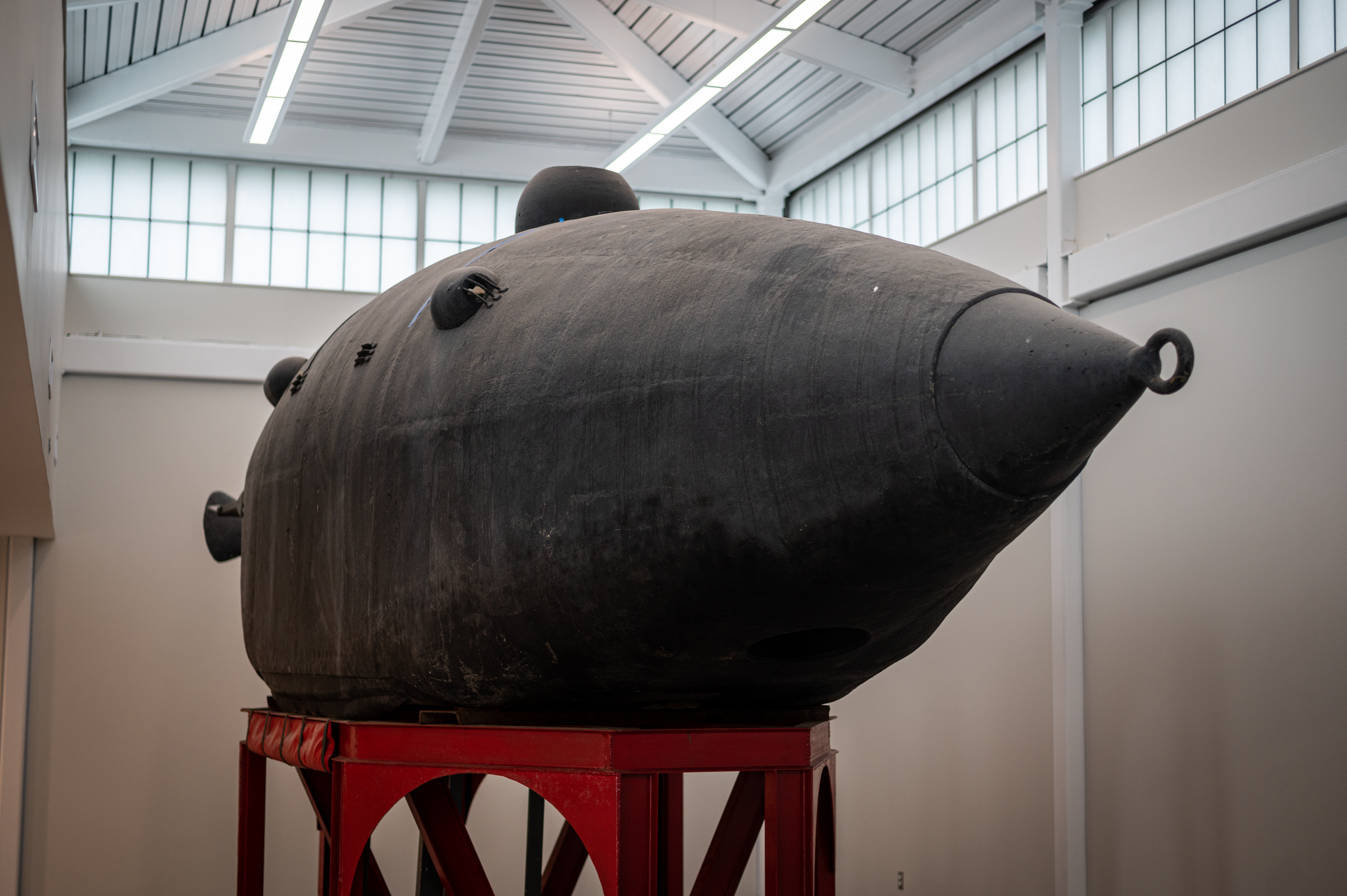
The Intelligent Whale on display in the National Guard Militia Museum

The National Guard Militia Museum of New Jersey is headquartered in Sea Girt, with a second museum located in Lawrenceville, New Jersey, and operates under the auspices of the New Jersey Department of Military Affairs.

The not-for-profit museum's purpose is to preserve and explain New Jersey's military heritage, by collecting, preserving and displaying artifacts with specific relevance and historical significance to the New Jersey Army National Guard, the New Jersey Air National Guard and the New Jersey Naval Militia. It is a member of the Army Museum System.

== Sea Girt Museum ==
The museum is headquartered at the National Guard Training Center in Sea Girt, and focuses on the role of the New Jersey Militia and National Guard from colonial times through the present day, with original and reproduction artifacts. The museum focuses on the role and experiences of the "citizen soldier". Established in 1980, the materials in the museum's collection have been documented and cataloged with the goal of becoming a certified Army museum. By 1999, the museum had more than 4,000 artifacts, including an example of the McClellan saddle designed by General George B. McClellan (later Governor of New Jersey), a collection of World War II photographs and static displays of vehicles and aircraft.

The Intelligent Whale, an experimental hand-cranked submarine based on an 1863 design is on display. Lawsuits and cost overruns meant the submarine wasn't available for combat in the Civil War. Originally planned to cost $15,000, the total cost ran up to quadruple the original estimate by the time it was completed in the late 1860s in Newark by the American Submarine Company. The submarine could carry four crew members who operated a hand-cranked propeller and could travel underwater at four knots. Compressed air allowed it to operate underwater for a total of up to ten hours and was also used to empty the ballast tanks to allow the submarine to surface. Test dives in the Passaic River in the late 1860s were successful, but the Navy decided to abandon the purchase after its operator was murdered. The submarine was transported to the museum in Sea Girt by truck in April 1999 from the Washington Naval Yard, where it had been located since 1968.

The museum is the home of the Center for U.S. War Veterans’ Oral History Project, which records interviews of veterans about their military experiences. These interviews are available on videotape and DVD for review by researchers and scholars. As of 2019, the center has recorded over 600 interviews with veterans serving in World War II and other conflicts through Operation Iraqi Freedom.

== Lawrenceville Field Artillery Annex ==
The Lawrenceville site is located on the Lawrenceville DMAVA campus in a new purpose-built building. Previously located in the historic Lawrenceville Armory, the museum reopened to the public in October, 2021. The collection of the museum focuses in on the history of New Jersey militia and National Guard, while there are additional displays that explain New Jersey military history in broader context. In addition to the museum annex building, fifteen tanks, armored vehicles and cannon are on display outdoors.
