= New Jersey Air National Guard =

- Emblem of the New Jersey Air National Guard
- Active: 30 January 1930 - present
- Country: United States
- Allegiance: New Jersey
- Branch: Air National Guard
- Type: State militia, military reserve force
- Role: "To meet state and federal mission responsibilities."
- Size: 2,300
- Part of: New Jersey National Guard; New Jersey Department of Military Affairs; United States Air Force; National Guard Bureau (Note: The New Jersey Air National Guard is only under the command of the United States Air Force if the Air National Guard units are activated by the Federal Government under the President’s invocation of the Insurrection Act of 1807.)
- Garrison/HQ: New Jersey Air National Guard, 400 Langley Avenue, Egg Harbor Township, New Jersey, 08234

Commanders
- Civilian leadership: President Donald Trump (Commander-in-Chief); Troy Meink (Secretary of the Air Force); Governor Mikie Sherrill (Governor of the State of New Jersey)
- State ANG commander: Col. Derek B. Routt
- State ANG Command Chief: CCM Wayne Miller

The New Jersey Air National Guard (NJ ANG) is the aerial militia of the State of New Jersey, United States of America. It is a reserve of the United States Air Force and along with the New Jersey Army National Guard, an element of the New Jersey National Guard of the larger United States National Guard Bureau.

As state militia units, the units in the New Jersey Air National Guard are not in the normal United States Air Force chain of command. They are under the jurisdiction of the governor of New Jersey through the office of the New Jersey Adjutant General unless they are deployed by order of the president of the United States. The New Jersey Air National Guard is headquartered at the McGuire AFB portion of Joint Base McGuire-Dix-Lakehurst, N.J., and its commander is Colonel Derek B. Routt.

== Overview ==
Under the "Total Force" concept, New Jersey Air National Guard units are considered to be Air Reserve Components (ARC) of the United States Air Force (USAF). New Jersey ANG units are trained and equipped by the Air Force and are operationally gained by a major command of the USAF if federalized. In addition, the New Jersey Air National Guard forces are assigned to Air Expeditionary Forces and are subject to deployment tasking orders along with their active duty and Air Force Reserve counterparts in their assigned cycle deployment window.

Along with their federal reserve obligations, as state militia units the elements of the New Jersey ANG are subject to being activated by order of the governor to provide protection of life and property, and preserve peace, order and public safety. State missions include disaster relief in times of earthquakes, hurricanes, floods and forest fires, search and rescue, protection of vital public services, and support to civil defense.

== Components ==
The New Jersey Air National Guard consists of the following major units:

- 108th Wing

Established 26 May 1949 (as: 141st Strategic Fighter Squadron); operates: KC-46A Pegasus
Stationed at: McGuire Air Force Base side of Joint Base McGuire-Dix-Lakehurst, New Hanover Township, New Jersey
Gained by: Air Mobility Command, USSTRATCOM
A composite unit made up of two squadrons, the 141st Air Refueling Squadron, operating the KC-46A tanker and the 150th Special Operations Squadron, operating a total of 2 C-32B aircraft. In addition to their primary air refueling mission, the Wing also supports an Intelligence Squadron.

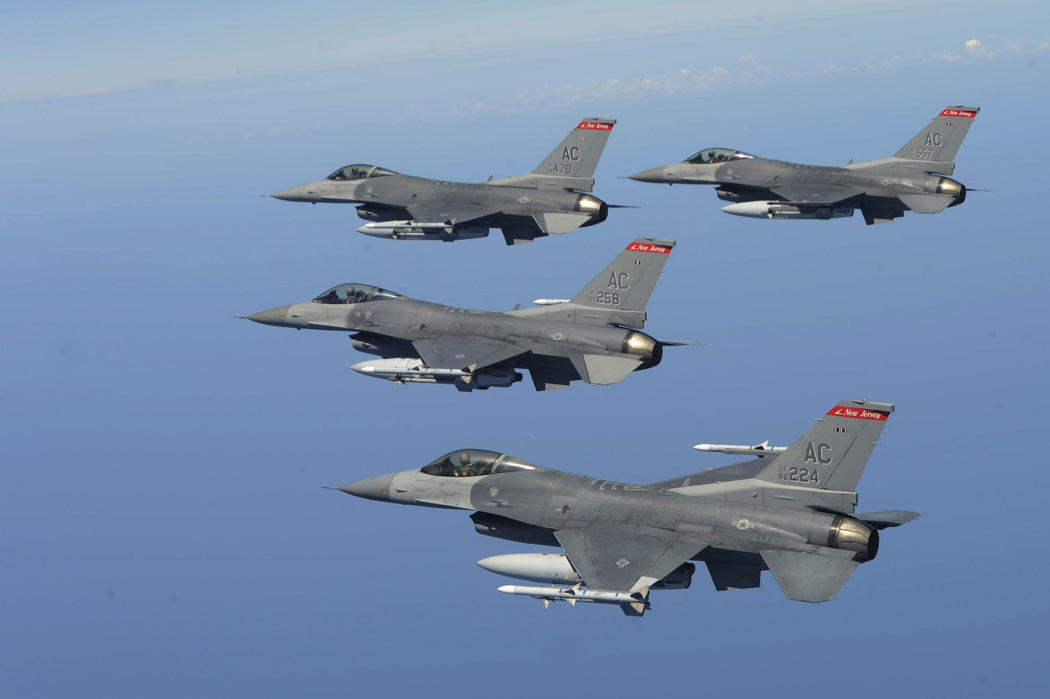
F-16C Fighting Falcons from the 177th Fighter Wing, August 2009.

- 177th Fighter Wing

Established 30 January 1930 (as: 119th Observation Squadron); operates: F-16C/D Fighting Falcon
Stationed at: Atlantic City Air National Guard Base, Egg Harbor Township, New Jersey
Gained by: Air Combat Command
Provides a Homeland Security air defense mission to the Eastern Air Defense Sector (EADS) and the North American Aerospace Defense Command (NORAD) and the Continental NORAD Region for peacetime air sovereignty, strategic air defense, and airborne counter-drug operations in the continental United States.

== History ==
=== World War I ===
The New Jersey Air National Guard origins date to 5 June 1917 with the establishment of the 5th Aviation School Squadron at Langley Field, Virginia. In September 1917 it was re-designated as the 119th Aero Squadron. The squadron was not deployed overseas during World War I, and after the 1918 Armistice with Germany was demobilized in 1919.

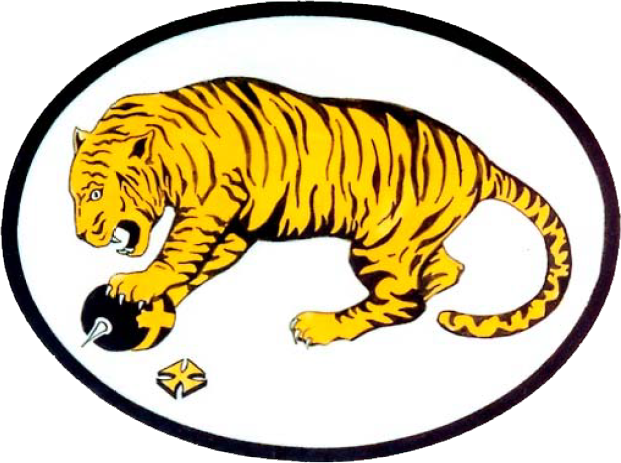
Emblem of the 141st Aero Squadron (Pursuit)

The 141st Aero Squadron (Pursuit) was an Air Service, United States Army pursuit squadron, and part of the American Expeditionary Force deployed to France. It was assigned to the 4th Pursuit Group, VI Corps, Air Service, Second United States Army, AEF near the end of World War I. The 141st was involved in 13 combats, the only pursuit squadron of the VI Corps, Air Service, Second Army to do so, and was credited with shooting down two enemy aircraft.

Its combat commander, Hobey Baker, was a famous hockey and football star at Princeton before the war. It was said, Hobey preferred Ivy League men in his unit, preferably from Princeton. Indeed, he painted the aircraft in his squadron in Princeton colors: Orange and Black. Captain Hobey Baker was killed on December 21, 1918 when he took a SPAD XIII up for one last ride. The SPAD developed engine trouble while taking off and Baker died when the aircraft crashed soon thereafter.

On 8 September 1973 By order of the Secretary of the Air Force, the 141st Aero Squadron (Pursuit), demobilized on 19 July 1919 was reconstituted and allotted to the State of New Jersey. It was ordered consolidated with the 141st Tactical Fighter Squadron. The consolidated unit was designated as the 141st Tactical Fighter Squadron and was extended federal recognition by the National Guard Bureau same date.

=== New Jersey National Guard ===
The Militia Act of 1903 established the present National Guard system, units raised by the states but paid for by the Federal Government, liable for immediate state service. If federalized by Presidential order, they fall under the regular military chain of command. On 1 June 1920, the Militia Bureau issued Circular No.1 on organization of National Guard air units.

The squadron was reactivated in 1930 when it was reorganized as the 119th Observation Squadron, New Jersey National Guard, at Metropolitan Airport, Newark, New Jersey as an air arm of the 44th Division Aviation and received federal recognition in January 1930.

In 1934, aircraft of the 119th Observation Squadron were dispatched to the scene of the "Morro Castle", a ship burning off the coast of Asbury Park, New Jersey. Many hours were spent flying over the ship and adjacent water assisting in the direction of rescue efforts and locating survivors. The 119th Observation Squadron was ordered into active service on 16 September 1940 as part of the buildup of the Army Air Corps prior to the United States entry into World War II.

=== New Jersey Air National Guard ===
On 24 May 1946, the United States Army Air Forces, in response to dramatic postwar military budget cuts imposed by President Harry S. Truman, allocated inactive unit designations to the National Guard Bureau for the formation of an Air Force National Guard. These unit designations were allotted and transferred to various State National Guard bureaus to provide them unit designations to re-establish them as Air National Guard units.

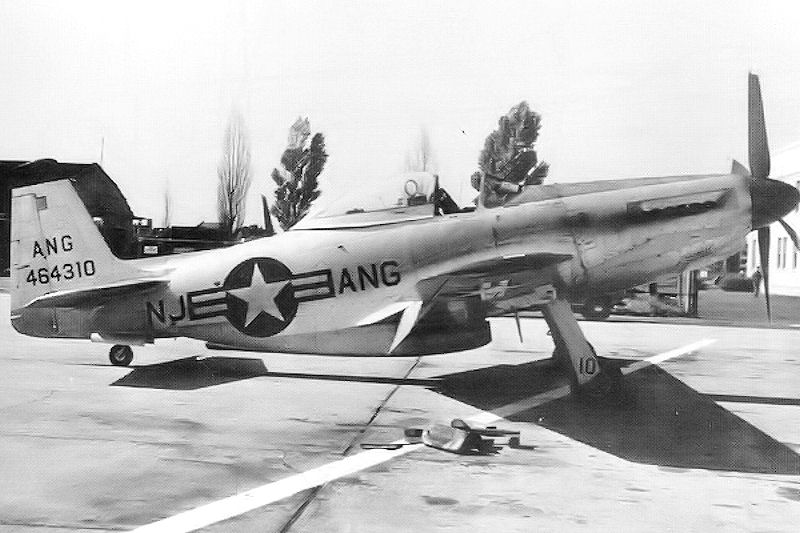
An F-51H Mustang of the 119th Fighter Squadron at Newark Airport, 1948

The modern New Jersey ANG received federal recognition on 9 February 1947 as the 119th Fighter Squadron at Newark Airport. It was equipped with F-51D Mustangs and its mission was the air defense of the state. 18 September 1947, however, is considered the New Jersey Air National Guard's official birth concurrent with the establishment of the United States Air Force as a separate branch of the United States military under the National Security Act

In May 1949, the 108th Fighter Group and 141st Fighter Squadron were extended federal recognition at Mercer Airport, Trenton. During the Korean War, The 108th was called to active federal service on 1 March 1951 and assigned to Strategic Air Command 40th Air Division. In its activated configuration, the wing was composed of the 141st Fighter Squadron (New Jersey ANG), 149th Fighter Squadron (Virginia ANG) and the 153rd Fighter Squadron (Mississippi ANG). The Wing was sent to Turner AFB, Georgia where it continued its mission to provide fighter escorts to SAC bombers on training missions. In December 1951 it was moved to Godman AFB, Kentucky where it replaced a unit deployed to England. It was released from active duty and returned to New Jersey state control on 10 November 1952.

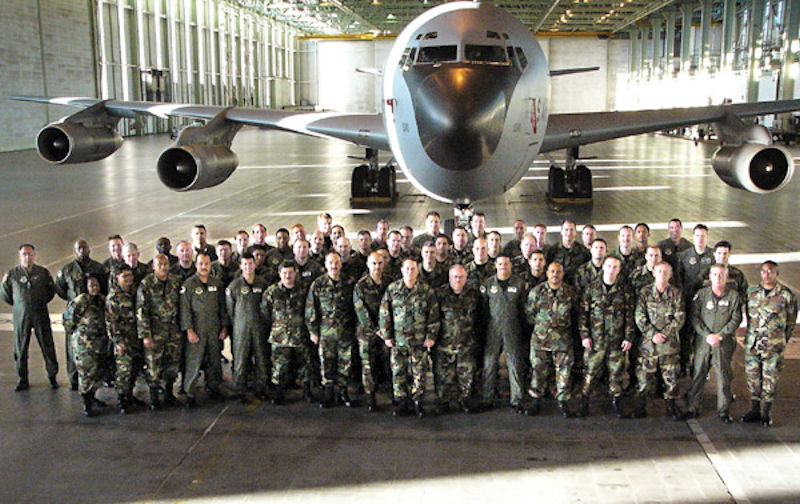
A KC-135 of the 108th Air Refueling Wing at Istres AB, France, 2011

After the Korean War mobilization, tn 30 November 1952, the Trenton units were moved to McGuire Air Force Base. In February 1956 due to congestion at Newark Airport, the 119th Fighter Squadron was moved from Newark to McGuire AFB. The NJ ANG was expanded with the formation of the 150th Air Transport Squadron also at McGuire. In August 1958, the 119th was moved from McGuire to the National Aviation Facilities Experimental Center and the former Naval Air Station Atlantic City facility. On 15 October 1962, the 119th was authorized to expand to a group level, and the 177th Tactical Fighter Group was established by the National Guard Bureau. The 119th TFS becoming the group's flying squadron.

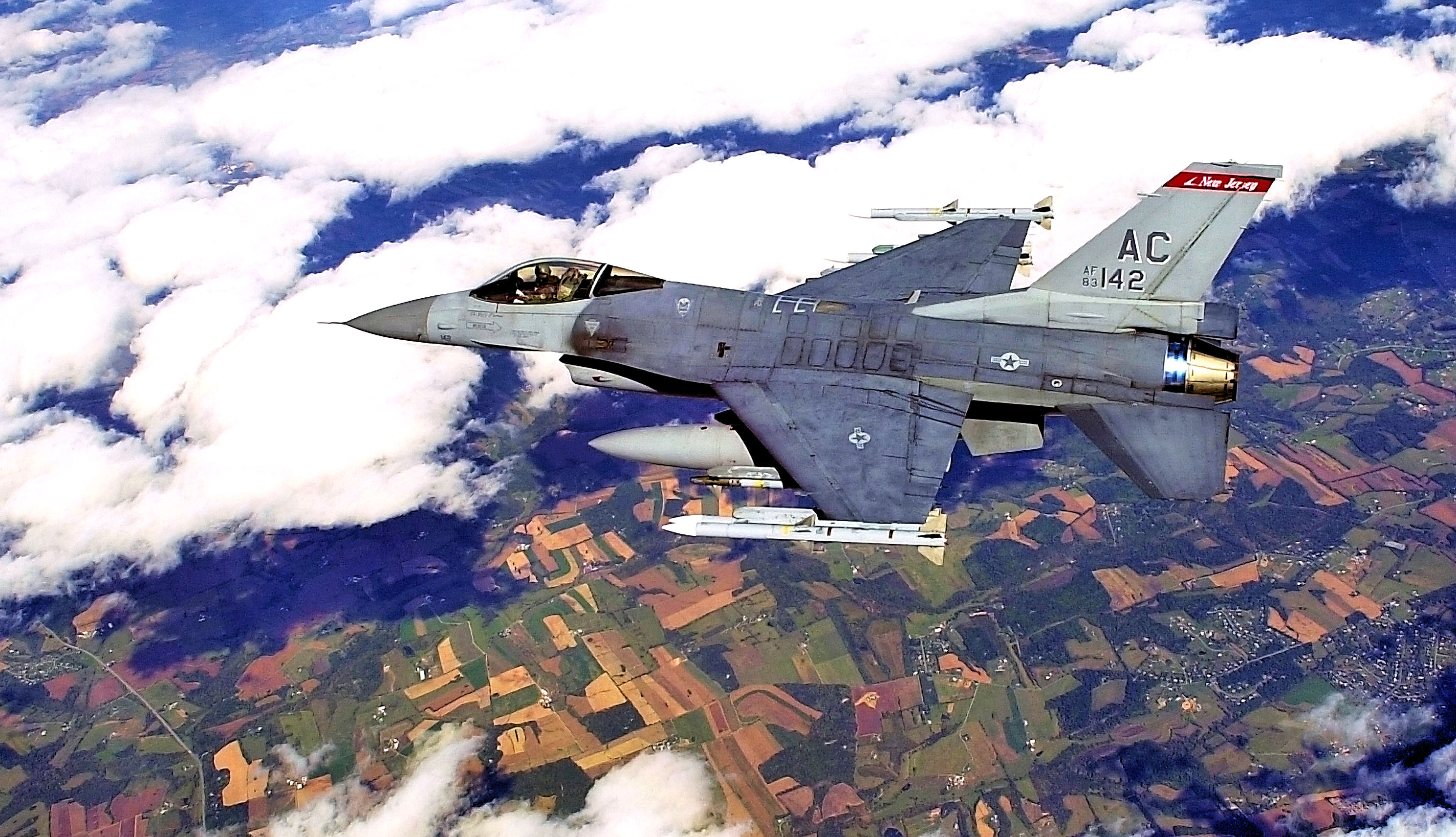
A F-16C Block 25B Fighting Falcon of the 119th Fighter Squadron. The 119th is the oldest unit in the New Jersey Air National Guard.

Today, the 108th Wing (108 WG) provides aerial refueling support to Air Force, Navy and Marine Corps and allied nation aircraft. The 177th Fighter Wing (177 FW) provides a Homeland Security air defense mission to the Eastern Air Defense Sector (EADS) and the North American Aerospace Defense Command (NORAD)

After the September 11th, 2001 terrorist attacks on the United States, elements of every Air National Guard unit in New Jersey has been activated in support of the global war on terrorism. Flight crews, aircraft maintenance personnel, communications technicians, air controllers and air security personnel were engaged in Operation Noble Eagle air defense overflights of major United States cities. Also, New Jersey ANG units have been deployed overseas as part of Operation Enduring Freedom in Afghanistan and Operation Iraqi Freedom in Iraq as well as other locations as directed. The New Jersey Air Guard has flown over 17,000 hours in the Middle East during ongoing operations for the Global War on Terrorism.

== See also ==
- New Jersey Naval Militia
- New Jersey State Guard
- New Jersey Wing Civil Air Patrol
