= Glenn K. Rieth =

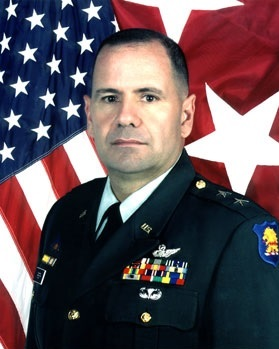
- Glenn K. Reith, former Adjutant General of the New Jersey National Guard.
- Born: November 27, 1957 (age 68); Livingston, New Jersey, U.S.
- Military career
- Allegiance: United States
- Branch: United States Army; New Jersey Army National Guard
- Service years: 1980-2011
- Rank: Major general
- Unit: New Jersey Army National Guard
- Commands: New Jersey National Guard (2002-2011)
- Awards: Legion of Merit; Meritorious Service Medal; Army Commendation Medal
- Other work: Deputy director, Mercer County Park Commission

Major General Glenn K. Rieth (born November 27, 1957, in Livingston, New Jersey) served as Adjutant General of New Jersey and the commander of the New Jersey Army and Air National Guard, which compose the New Jersey Department of Military Affairs. His service began in March 2002 and ended with his resignation in December 2011.

== Early life and career ==
Raised in Livingston, New Jersey, Rieth graduated from Livingston High School in 1976. He played quarterback on the high school's football team.

Rieth earned a Bachelor of Arts in Business Administration from The Citadel, where he was a Distinguished Military Graduate. Rieth's military service began in 1980. He received his commission as a Second Lieutenant through the Army Reserve Officer Training Corps. He earned his pilot's wings at Fort Rucker, Alabama, in July 1981. Prior to being appointed as Adjutant General of New Jersey, Rieth was Director of the State Army Aviation Office for the New Jersey Army National Guard. On January 3, 2006, Governor-elect Jon Corzine announced he would re-appoint Major General Rieth to another term as Adjutant General in his administration.

Rieth was an Army helicopter pilot for four years before joining New Jersey's National Guard as an active duty officer. His father, Kenneth Rieth, was the state's deputy adjutant general in the Democratic administration of Jim Florio. The elder Rieth retired in 1991 as a Brigadier General. The younger Rieth's father-in-law, G. Bruce Eveland, reportedly recommended that then-Governor McGreevey, hire Rieth, according to Jack McGreevey, father of the former governor and a longtime friend of Eveland.

== Adjutant General ==
Glenn Rieth was appointed Adjutant General in 2002 by Governor James E. McGreevey and confirmed by the New Jersey Senate on March 4, 2002. He held the post until resigning in December 2011 in a scandal over his relationship with a female subordinate.

On January 15, 2010, Governor-elect Chris Christie announced he would re-appoint Major General Rieth for another term as Adjutant General. Both had been raised in Livingston and their families knew each other. Major General Rieth served under both Democratic and Republican governors spanning the administrations of McGreevey, Corzine, and Christie, as well as Richard Codey.

On December 1, 2011, however, Reith resigned, effective December 15, 2011, after having had an affair with a female co-worker, a government official said. After leaving the adjutant general's position, Rieth was employed as deputy director of the Mercer County Park Commission.

== Education ==
- 1980 Bachelor of Arts in Business Administration, The Citadel, The Military College of South Carolina
- 1980 Armor Officer Basic Course
- 1981 United States Army Rotary Wing and Fixed Wing Flight Schools
- 1985 Rotary Wing Instructor Pilot School
- 1986 United States Army Safety Officer Course
- 1988 Aviation Officer Advanced Course
- 1990 United States Air Force Joint Air/Ground Operations School
- 1991 United States Army Command and General Staff College
- 1999 United States Army War College

== Assignments ==
- October 1980 - July 1981, United States Army Rotary and Fixed Wing Flight Schools, Fort Rucker, Alabama.
- July 1981 - May 1984, platoon leader, assistant S-3, Aero Recon (UH-1), Air Cavalry Troop, 3rd Armored Cavalry Regiment, Fort Bliss, Texas.
- June 1984 - June 1985, commander, Aero Recon (UH-1), Air Cavalry Troop, 3rd Armored Cavalry Regiment, Fort Bliss, Texas.
- June 1985 - October 1987, aviation brigade safety officer and flight instructor, 50th Armored Division, Army Aviation Support Facility #1, Trenton-Mercer Airport, NJ.
- November 1987 - February 1990, operations officer (S-3), 1st Battalion, 150th Aviation, Army Aviation Support Facility # 1, Trenton-Mercer Airport, NJ.
- March 1990 - October 1992, air operations officer, (G-3 Air), Headquarters 50th Armored Division, Somerset, NJ.
- November 1992 - September 1995, commander, 1st Battalion, 150th Aviation, Army Aviation Support Facility # 1, Trenton-Mercer Airport, NJ.
- October 1995 - January 1999, recruiting and retention commander, New Jersey Army National Guard, Fort Dix, NJ.
- February 1999 - January 2002, director, State Army Aviation Office, Army Aviation Support Facility # 1, Trenton-Mercer Airport, New Jersey.
- March 2002 – December 2011, The Adjutant General of New Jersey, New Jersey Department of Military and Veterans Affairs, Trenton, New Jersey.

== Flight information ==
- Rating: Instructor Pilot, Pilot-in-Command
- Master Army Aviator Badge
- Flight Hours: Over 3,000
- Aircraft Flown: AH-1, UH-1, T-42, U-8

== Major awards and decorations ==
- Legion of Merit
- Meritorious Service Medal with three Oak Leaf Clusters
- Army Commendation Medal
- Army Achievement Medal with one Oak Leaf Cluster
- Army Reserve Components Achievement Medal
- National Defense Service Medal
- Armed Forces Reserve Medal
- Army Service Ribbon
- Army Aviation Order of Saint Michael
- Master Army Aviator Badge
- Parachutist Badge (Airborne)
- New Jersey Distinguished Service Medal
- New Jersey Medal of Honor
- New Jersey Merit Award
- New Jersey Desert Storm Ribbon

== Effective dates of promotion ==
- Second lieutenant, May 17, 1980
- First lieutenant, November 28, 1981
- Captain, January 1, 1984
- Major, September 28, 1988
- Lieutenant colonel, November 18, 1993
- Colonel, February 17, 1999
- Brigadier general, November 19, 2002
- Major general, July 23, 2004
