= New Jersey Department of Military Affairs =

New Jersey government department

- Seal of the NJDMA

Department overview
- Formed: May 31, 1948; 78 years ago (as Department of Defense)
- Jurisdiction: Government of New Jersey
- Headquarters: 101 Eggerts Crossing Road Lawrence Township, New Jersey
- Annual budget: US$94.3 million (FY2027) (88% federal)
- Department executives: Yvonne Mays, Adjutant General; Arthur Roscoe, Deputy Adjutant General
- Child agencies: New Jersey Air National Guard; New Jersey Army National Guard; New Jersey Challenge Academy; New Jersey Naval Militia; New Jersey State Guard
- Website: www.nj.gov/dma/

The New Jersey Department of Military Affairs (NJDMA) is a principal department in the executive branch of the New Jersey government charged with managing the state militia, which under state and federal law encompasses the New Jersey Air National Guard, the New Jersey Army National Guard, the New Jersey Naval Militia, and the New Jersey State Guard. The latter two components are currently inactive.

== History ==
New Jersey has had a militia since its founding as a British colony. The militia was administered jointly by several independent agencies, including the Adjutant General's Department and the Quartermaster General's Department, until the establishment of a unified state Department of Defense in 1948. The Department of Defense was given responsibility for administering veteran benefits and was reorganized into the Department of Veterans Affairs and Defense in 1987, then renamed to the Department of Military and Veterans Affairs the following year.

In 2026, after several controversies and lawsuits over mismanagement of state-run veterans homes during the COVID-19 pandemic, responsibility for veterans benefits was transferred to a separate Department of Veterans Affairs. The Department of Military and Veterans Affairs was renamed to the Department of Military Affairs and retained its oversight of the New Jersey National Guard.

== Organizational structure ==
The Department of Military Affairs is headed by the Adjutant General, a military officer appointed by the Governor with the advice and consent of the Senate. The current Adjutant General is Brigadier General Yvonne Mays, who was confirmed by the Senate on October 28, 2024.

=== Joint Staff ===
The Joint Staff is led by the Director of Joint Staff, who is assisted by the Chief of the Joint Staff. The Joint Staff is divided into several directorates: J1 (human resources), J2 (intelligence), J3 (operations), J4 (logistics), J6 (network), J8 (finance), and J9 (joint resiliency).

=== Components of the New Jersey National Guard ===
The New Jersey National Guard has two components: the New Jersey Army National Guard and the New Jersey Air National Guard. The members of each are simultaneously part of the federal Army National Guard and Air National Guard, respectively. Each component is led by an Assistant Adjutant General.

== Related legislation ==
- 1948: Act of May 21, 1948, P.L. 1948, c. 82
- 1987: Act of January 16, 1988, P.L. 1987, c. 444
- 1988: Act of October 12, 1988, P.L. 1988, c. 138
- 2025: New Jersey Department of Veterans Affairs Act, P.L. 2025, c. 139

== See also ==
- United States National Guard
- United States National Guard Bureau
