= Intelligent Whale =

1860s American experimental submarine

Coordinates: 40°7′45″N 74°2′31.6″W

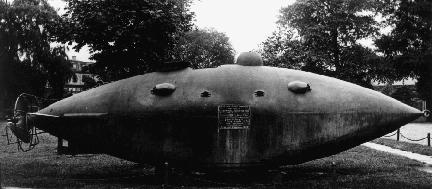
- Intelligent Whale at the Navy Museum, Washington Navy Yard

History

United States
- Name: Intelligent Whale
- Laid down: 1863
- Acquired: 29 October 1869
- Out of service: 1873
- Status: Museum exhibit

General characteristics
- Type: Submarine
- Displacement: 4,000 lb (1,800 kg)
- Length: 28 ft 8 in (8.74 m)
- Beam: 7 ft (2.1 m)
- Draft: 9 ft (2.7 m)
- Propulsion: Hand-cranked screw
- Speed: 4 knots (4.6 mph; 7.4 km/h)
- Endurance: 10 hours
- Complement: 6 to 13 officers and men
- Armament: Hatch for diver

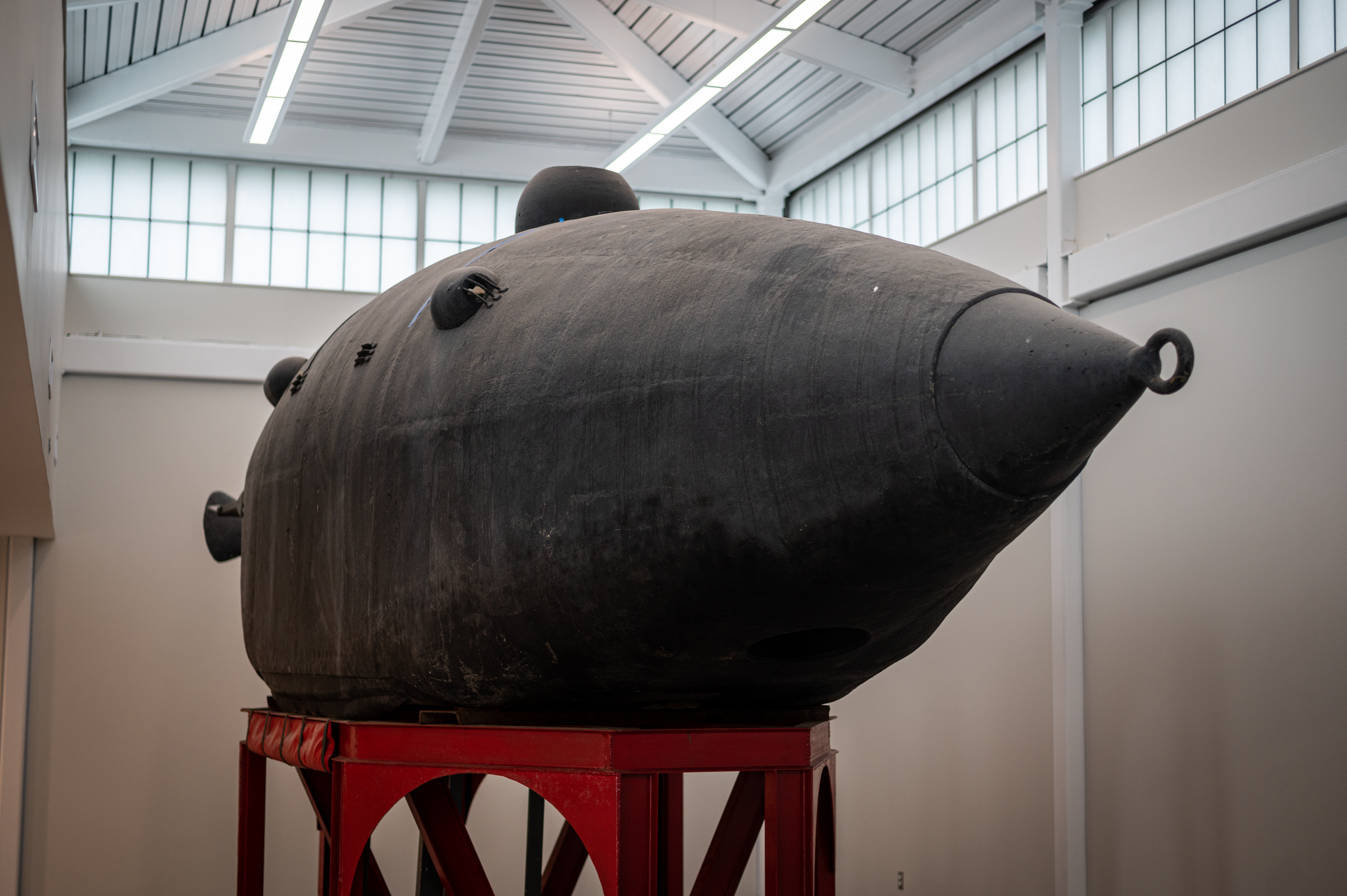
Intelligent Whale on display in the National Guard Militia Museum of New Jersey

Intelligent Whale is an experimental hand-cranked submarine developed for potential use by the United States Navy in the 1860s.

== History ==
Intelligent Whale was built on the design of Scovel Sturgis Merriam in 1863 by Augustus Price and Cornelius Scranton Bushnell. In 1864 the American Submarine Company was formed, taking over the interests of Bushnell and Price and there followed years of litigation over the ownership of the craft. Intelligent Whale was completed and launched in 1866. Once title was established by a court, and following a preliminary inspection by three U. S. Navy officers (Cdrs. C. Melanchon Smith, Augustus L. Case, and Edmund O. Matthews) the submarine was sold on 29 October 1869 through a contract made by owner Oliver Halstead and Secretary of the Navy George M. Robeson to the United States Navy Department, with most of the price to be paid after successful trials. In September 1872 the first trial was held and was unsuccessful, whereupon the department refused further payments and abandoned the project.

Intelligent Whale submerged by filling water compartments, and expelled the water by pumps and compressed air. It was estimated that it could stay submerged for about ten hours. Thirteen crewmen could be accommodated, but only six were needed to make her operational. The only known trial, reported by submarine pioneer John Philip Holland, was made by a certain General Sweeney and two others. They submerged the boat in 16 feet (5 m) of water and Sweeney, clad in a diver's suit, emerged through a hole in the bottom, placed a charge under a scow, and reentered the submarine. The charge was exploded by a lanyard and a friction primer attached to the charge, sinking the scow.

Following the failed trial in 1872, Intelligent Whale was put on display at the Brooklyn Navy Yard and remained there until 1968 when she was moved to the Washington Navy Yard where she remained until being relocated to the National Guard Militia Museum of New Jersey in Sea Girt, New Jersey, where she is currently on display.

The U.S. Navy did not accept a submarine for service until the USS Holland was commissioned in 1900.

== See also ==
- Turtle (submersible)
- Nautilus (1800 submarine)
- CSS H.L. Hunley
- CSS David
- USS Alligator (1862)
- USS Plunger (1895)
- USS Holland (SS-1)
- Fenian Ram

== Sources ==
- HNSA Web Page: USS Intelligent Whale
