= New Jersey Wing Civil Air Patrol =

Highest echelon of New Jersey Civil Air Patrol

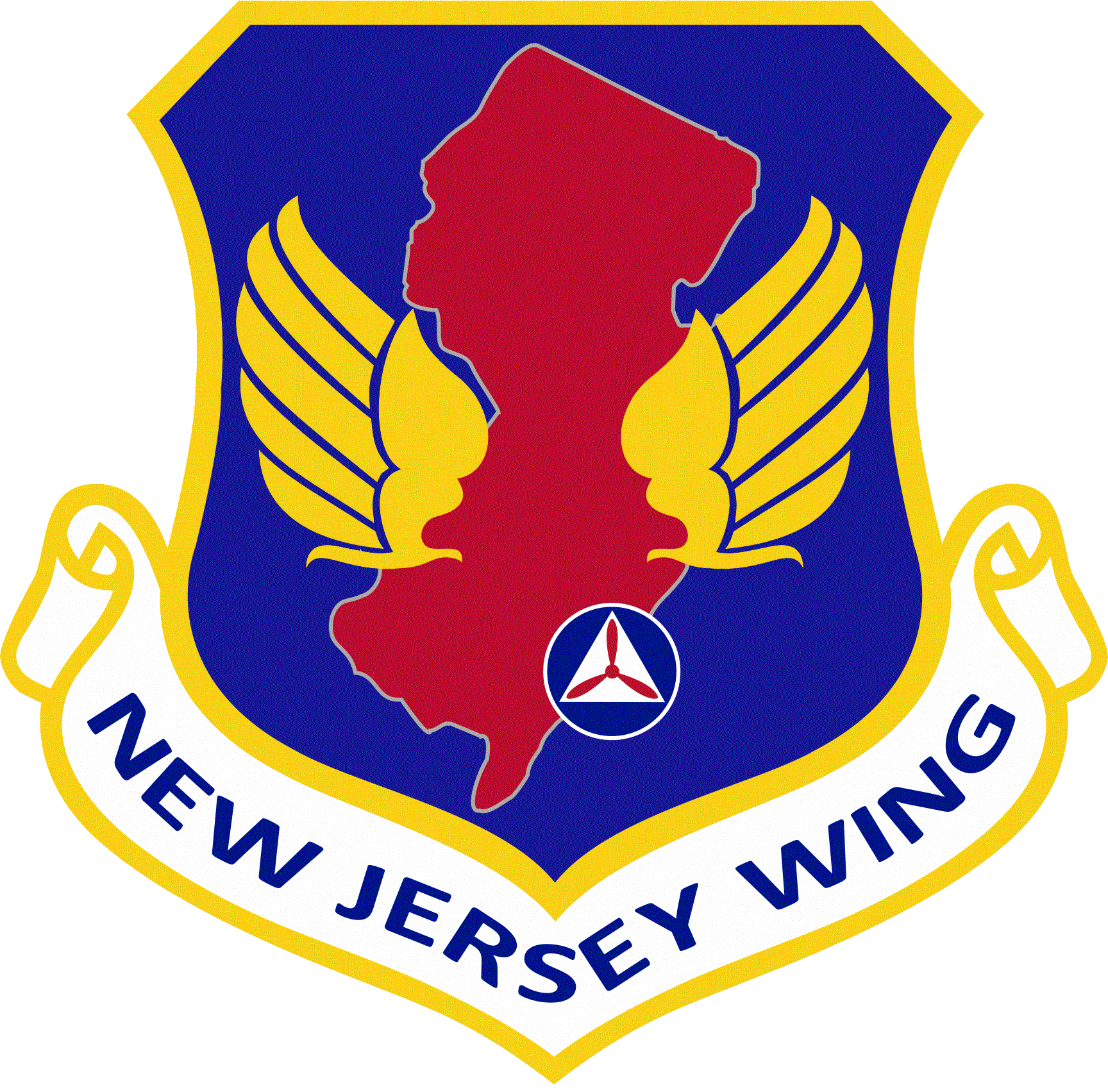
- New Jersey Wing of Civil Air Patrol

Associated branches
- United States Air Force

Command staff
- Commander: Col Amy Myzie
- Deputy Commander: Lt Col Michael Sperry
- Chief of Staff: Lt Col Jennifer Rudolph

Current statistics
- Cadets: 1008
- Seniors: 625
- Total Membership: 1,633
- Awards: CAP Unit Citation (2018), USAF Organizational Excellence Award (2019), COVID Disaster Relief Ribbon with Attachment (2020), Jefferson Award (Gold Medal) for Volunteer Service (2022), NJ State Governor's Award for Volunteer Service (2024)
- Website: njwg.cap.gov
- Statistics as of March 2026

The New Jersey Wing of the Civil Air Patrol (CAP) is the highest echelon of Civil Air Patrol in the state of New Jersey. New Jersey Wing headquarters are located at the McGuire AFB entity of Joint Base McGuire–Dix–Lakehurst. New Jersey Wing consists of over 1,500 auxiliary airmen who are members of 25 squadrons across the state of New Jersey.

The wing was founded on December 1, 1941. It styles itself "The Birthplace of Civil Air Patrol" as during CAP's inception in World War II, its first coastal patrol base was opened at Bader Field in Atlantic City, NJ.

== Mission ==
The Civil Air Patrol has three primary missions: providing emergency services; offering cadet programs for youth; and providing aerospace education for CAP members and the general public.

=== Emergency services ===
The New Jersey Wing Civil Air Patrol maintains a fleet of 12 vehicles, 6 fixed wing aircraft, radio communications bases in North, Central and South Jersey and various other communication and SAR equipment and is tasked with aeronautical search and rescue missions for the state of New Jersey, coordinated by the Air Force Rescue Coordination Center. The Wing maintains trained incident command, ground search and rescue teams prepared to act in tandem with state and federal agency partners as well as the New Jersey National Guard and the US Coast Guard. The Civil Air Patrol also provides humanitarian support in support of the Red Cross, airborne imagery and communications support for the Federal Emergency Management Agency (FEMA) and the National Weather Service, as well as the US Army Corps and Engineers and other agencies as well as counter-drug operations. The NJ Wing is also a member of New Jersey Task Force One, the State of New Jersey disaster relief and emergency response task force coordinated by the NJ State Police. The CAP also provides Air Force support through conducting light transport, communications support, and low-altitude route surveys.

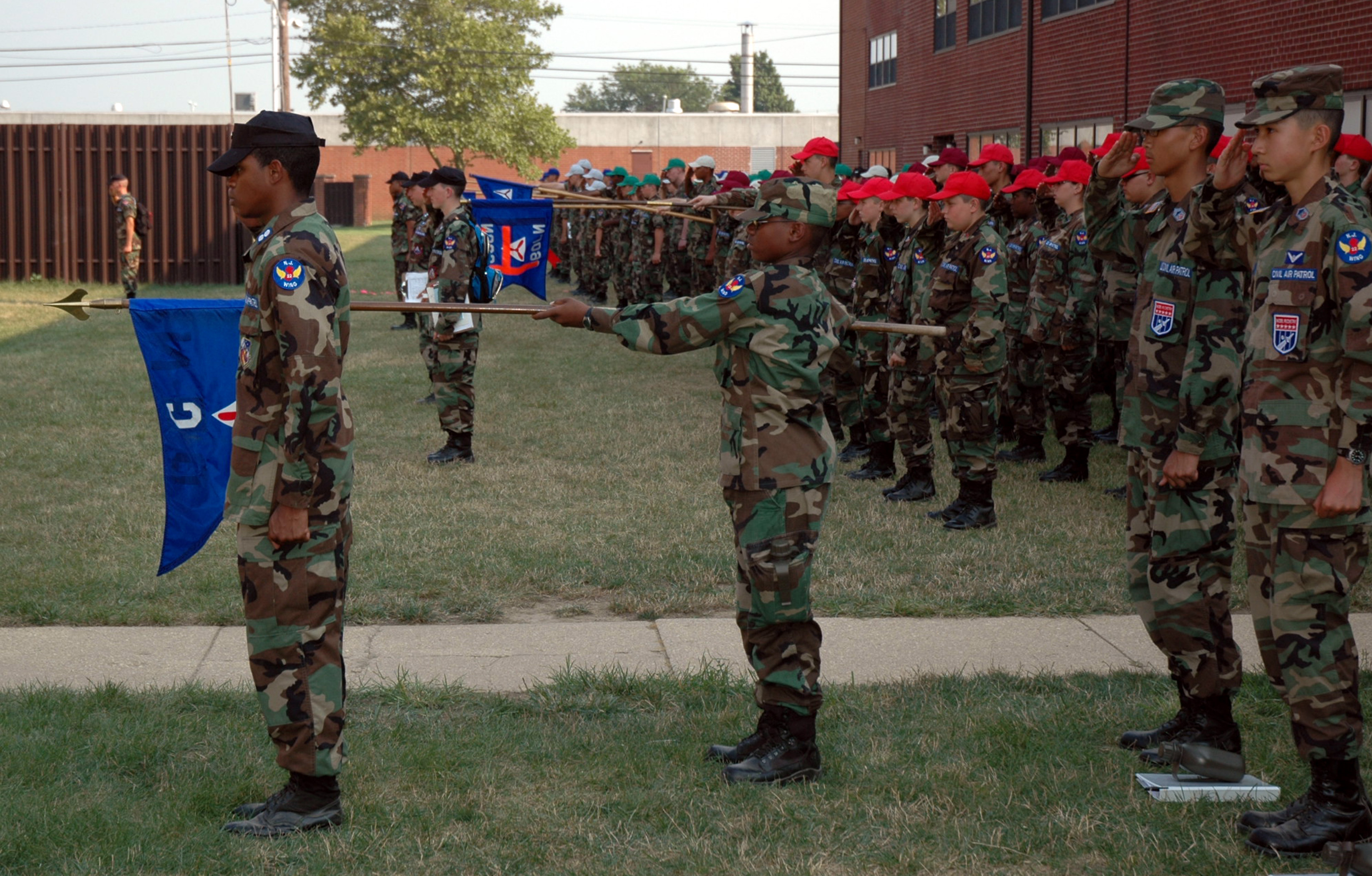
Civil Air Patrol cadets from the New Jersey Civil Air Patrol Wing participate in a retreat ceremony marking the end of their duty day at the U.S. Air Force Expeditionary Center on Fort Dix, N.J. before NJWG's ejection from the center in 2013.

In November 2012, after Hurricane Sandy struck the east coast of the United States, the New Jersey Wing assisted in the disaster response. Aircrews flew aerial imagery missions providing more than 71,000 high-resolution images of damaged areas throughout the state. NJ Wing also flew FEMA personnel for damage assessment and reconnaissance missions, . On the ground, more than 50 members provided over 1,500 man-hours supporting a Red Cross shelter in Pleasantville. Over the 52 consecutive days the Civil Air Patrol was mobilized in response to Sandy, 146 New Jersey Wing members contributed over 7,000 hours of volunteer service.

=== Cadet programs ===
The Civil Air Patrol offers a cadet program for youth aged 12 to 21. The cadet program is organized around four main program elements: leadership, aerospace, fitness, and character. Cadets progress through the self-paced program to complete tasks in each program area in order to earn promotions and awards.

=== Aerospace education ===
The Civil Air Patrol promotes and supports aerospace education, both for its own members and the general public. Cadets are offered aerospace education as a part of the cadet program. Teachers can get free classroom materials and lesson plans from CAP through CAP’s Aerospace Education Membership program.

== Organization ==
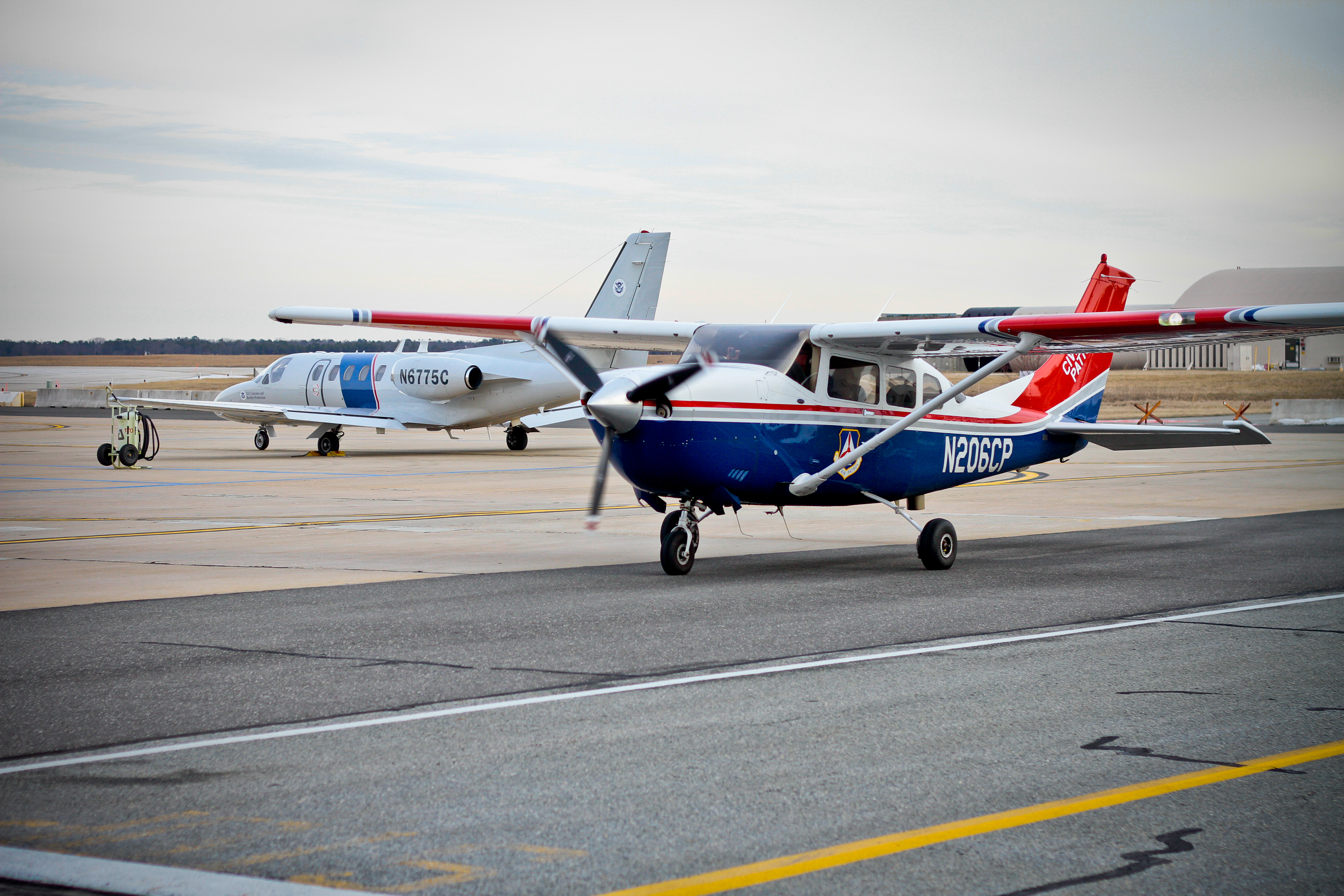
A Civil Air Patrol aircraft taxis at Atlantic City Air National Guard Base, N.J. prior to an intercept exercise in preparation for Super Bowl XLVIII.

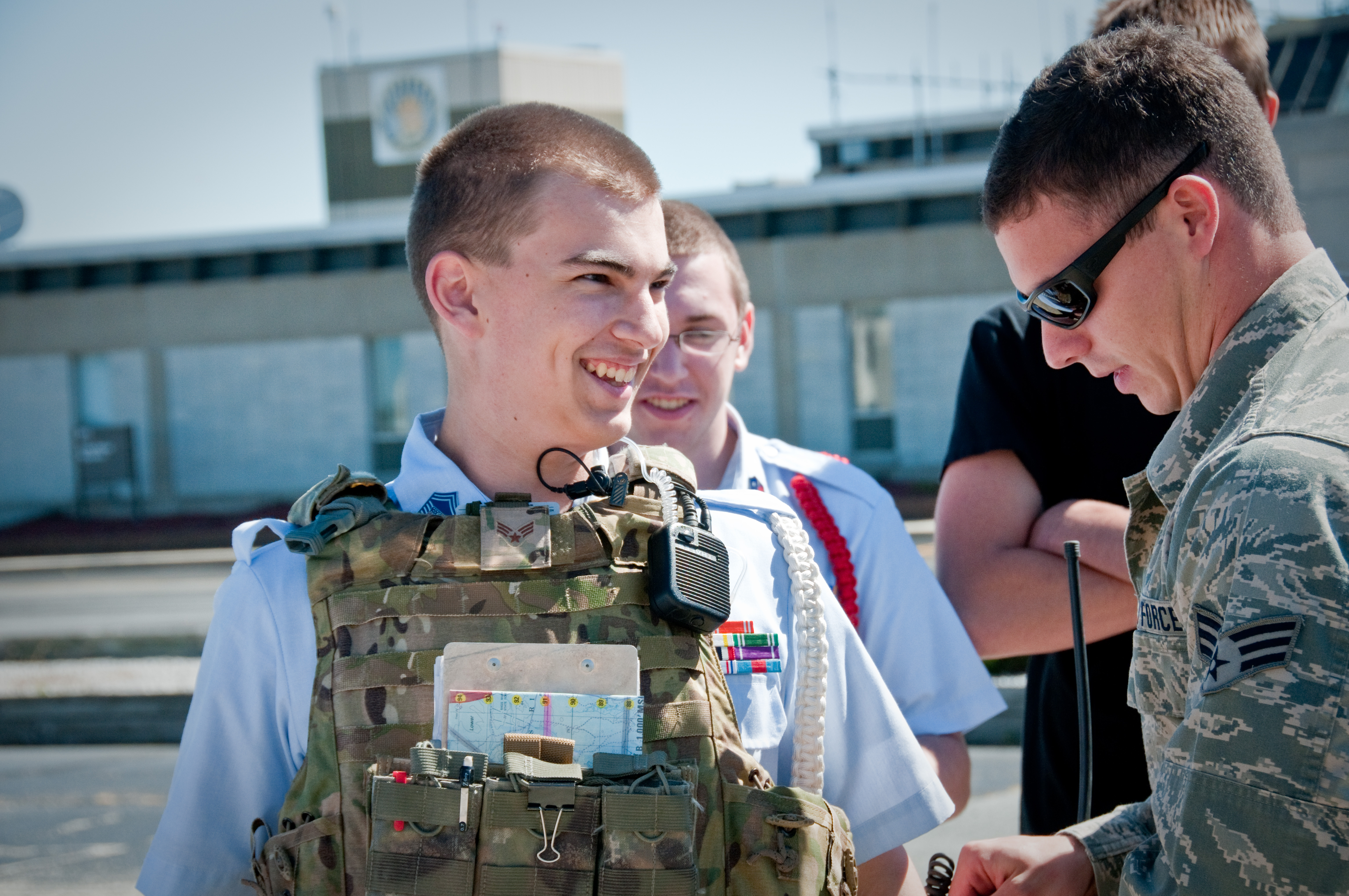
U.S. Air Force Senior Airman Ethan Hugg helps some Civil Air Patrol Cadets from the Cumberland Composite Squadron, NJ into his body armor at 177th Fighter Wing.

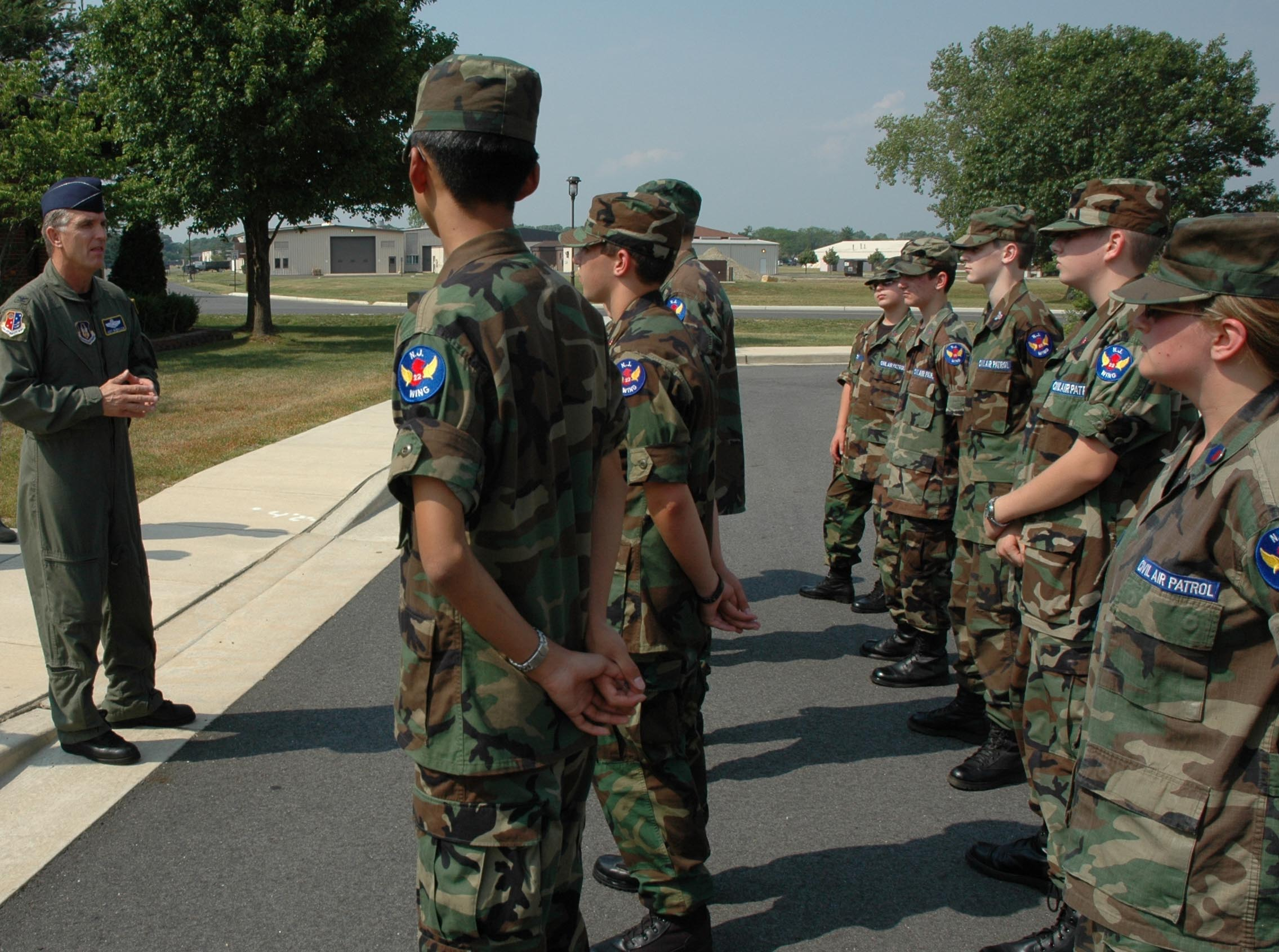
Civil Air Patrol cadets meet Air Force Reserve leadership during the cadet's recent visit to McGuire Air Force Base.

Squadrons of the New Jersey Wing
Designation	Squadron Name	Location	Notes
NJ001	New Jersey Wing Headquarters	McGuire AFB	
NJ002	Cumberland Composite Squadron	Vineland	
NJ003	Raritan Valley Composite Squadron	Hillsborough	
NJ035	Teaneck Composite Squadron	Teaneck	
NJ037	Gloucester County Composite Squadron	Glassboro	
NJ058	Lone Eagle Composite Squadron	Gladstone	
NJ059	Jack Schweiker Composite Squadron	Cherry Hill	
NJ067	Bayshore Composite Squadron	Middletown	
NJ073	Curtiss-Wright Composite Squadron	Fairfield, Essex County	
NJ079	Air Victory Museum Composite Squadron	Lumberton	
NJ082	Allentown Composite Squadron	Allentown	
NJ086	Maj Thomas B. McGuire Jr. Composite Squadron	McGuire AFB	
NJ090	Walter M. Schirra Jr. Composite Squadron	Mahwah	
NJ092	Twin Pine Composite Squadron	West Trenton	
NJ093	Picatinny Composite Squadron	Sparta	
NJ096	Pineland Composite Squadron	Lakewood	
NJ097	Teterboro Composite Squadron	Teterboro	
NJ102	Captain "Bud" Jackson Composite Squadron	Edison	
NJ103	General Jimmy Stewart Composite Squadron	Sayreville	
NJ105	Atlantic County Composite Squadron	Egg Harbor Township	
NJ107	Delaware Valley Composite Squadron	Whitehouse Station	
NJ112	Jersey City Composite Squadron	Jersey City	
NJ804	Riverside Cadet Squadron	Cinnaminson	
NJ999	New Jersey Legislative Squadron	Trenton	

== Notable Commanders ==
Col Joseph Abegg (CAP), former New Jersey Wing Commander and awardee of the FAA MASTER PILOT AWARD, ran on the Republican ticket for Burlington County Commissioner in 2025. He was defeated by Democrat Allison Eckel by nearly 40,000 votes.

== See also ==
- Awards and decorations of the Civil Air Patrol
- New Jersey Air National Guard
- New Jersey Naval Militia
- New Jersey State Guard
