= New Jersey Naval Militia =

The New Jersey Naval Militia
- New Jersey Naval Militia Insignia
- Active: 1895–1963, 1999–2002
- Country: United States
- Allegiance: State of New Jersey
- Type: Naval militia
- Role: Military reserve force
- Part of: New Jersey Department of Military and Veterans Affairs

Commanders
- Civilian Leadership: Governor of New Jersey

The New Jersey Naval Militia (NJNM) is the inactive naval militia of the state of New Jersey. It was deactivated in 2002.

In 2005 General Glenn K Reith published a report which stood down the Naval Militia. The report listed concerns about training, accession processes, security clearances, background checks, rank criteria, medical standards, physical fitness criteria, vessel fitness, and command qualifications.

The duties performed by the Naval Militia were absorbed by multiple organizations, including civilian volunteer groups, such as the Coast Guard Auxiliary and CERT, private security firms, military organizations including the New Jersey National Guard and the U.S. Coast Guard, and law enforcement agencies on the local, state, and federal level which operate along the New Jersey waterfront, including the New Jersey State Police.

General Reith stated that the NJNM-JC had no defined mission.

A group of former members have been meeting regularly and established the NJ Naval Militia Foundation, which has been lobbying to have the New Jersey Naval Militia funded and returned to active duty. Supporters of the unit of the NJ Naval Militia's formed non-profit New Jersey Naval Militia Foundation.

== History ==
The New Jersey Naval Militia was originally called the Naval Reserve of New Jersey. Founded in 1895, with the purpose of protecting the coast, harbors, and waterfront property. After the passage of the Federal Naval Reserve Law of 1916, the name was changed to the Naval Militia of New Jersey. The NJNM first saw combat during the Spanish–American War, and also fought in the World War I and World War II. After reaching a peak strength of 3,590 during the Korean War, the NJNM was absorbed by the United States Naval Reserve in 1963, after which it ceased to exist as an independent organization.

In 1999, the NJNM was reorganized by Governor Christine Todd-Whitman to better integrate the NJNM with the New Jersey State Guard.

As a naval militia, the NJNM was partially regulated and equipped by the federal government, but served as a reserve force under the control of the State of New Jersey. Naval militias are authorized and regulated by federal law under Title 32 of the United States Code. New Jersey law also allows for the state to maintain a naval militia. As it was under state jurisdiction, the Governor of New Jersey was the Commander-in-chief of the NJNM.

== Notable Missions Post-9/11 ==
After the attacks of September 11, 2001 the NJNM was called to State Active Duty (SAD) to assist in recovery, including a deployment of the NJNM's Disaster Medical Assistance Team and the Chaplain Corps to Staten Island, and the ferrying of evidence collected from Ground Zero to Manhattan's Chelsea Pier and Staten Island. The NJNM also took part in Operation Noble Eagle. As a naval militia, in the aftermath of the attacks of 9/11, the NJNM supported homeland security operations and disaster recovery. Missions conducted by the NJNM between September 11, 2001, and 2002 include:

- Waterborne security at the bases of the George Washington Bridge
- Daylight vessel traffic control on the Hudson River, north of the George Washington Bridge
- Standby vessel for search and rescue detail Coast Guard Station Sandy Hook, NJ
- Transport of military personnel and equipment from NJ to North Cove (Ground Zero)
- V.I.P. transportation and security detail for Liberty State Park tribute events during October 2001
- 192 days of water-borne security assisting naval personnel at Naval Weapons Station Earle
- 180 days of continuous daylight patrols assisting the NJ State Police at Salem Nuclear Generating Station, Salem, NJ

== Organization ==
The NJNM was originally organized at a brigade level. By 1912, the NJNM was organized into two brigades, consisting of 346 members, and different ships loaned by the federal government: the monitor U.S.S. Ajax in 1898, and the vessels USS Vixen, USS Adams, and USS Marietta.

During its activation from 1999 to 2002, the New Jersey Naval Militia was combined with the inactive New Jersey State Guard to form the New Jersey Naval Militia Joint Command, which was divided into three battalions.

=== The Organized Militia of NJ is made up of 3 components ===
- New Jersey Army National Guard
- New Jersey Air National Guard
- New Jersey Naval Militia Joint Command
- The NJ Naval Militia has 3 Battalions
  - 1st Battalion is the Naval Militia which is made up of drilling naval reservists
  - 2nd Battalion is part of the State Guard and does boat operations
  - 3rd Battalion (is everything else and is also part of the state guard) including:
    - The Army State Guard detachment
    - Training
    - Medical, etc.
    - https://www.nj.gov/military/admin/departments/state-militia/

== Equipment ==
In 1999, the NJNM had maintained eight boats donated by the city of Linden, the U.S. Coast Guard and the New Jersey State Police.

== See also ==
- United States Coast Guard Auxiliary
- United States Coast Guard
- United States Naval Sea Cadet Corps
- New Jersey Wing Civil Air Patrol
- United States Power Squadrons
- New Jersey National Guard
- New Jersey State Police
- Port Authority of New York and New Jersey Police Department
- National Guard Militia Museum of New Jersey
- New Jersey State Guard
- New York Naval Militia
