= New Jersey State Guard =

- Active: 1917–1919; 1941–1947
- Country: United States
- Allegiance: New Jersey
- Type: State defense force
- Role: Military reserve force

Commanders
- Civilian leadership: Governor of New Jersey

The New Jersey State Guard, previously known as the New Jersey State Militia, is the inactive state defense force of New Jersey, and is one of New Jersey's authorized military forces. The State Guard served as the stateside replacement for the New Jersey National Guard during World War I and World War II when the National Guard was deployed abroad.

The New Jersey State Guard, along with the New Jersey National Guard and the New Jersey Naval Militia, is recognized as a component of the organized militia of New Jersey.

== History ==
=== World War I ===
On 22 March 1917, the state of New Jersey authorized a State Militia to respond to emergencies and provide reinforcements to local law enforcement in the event of a riot or disorder. Ultimately, the New Jersey State Militia reached a strength of 36 infantry companies, two machine gun companies, and seven bands, all organized into seven battalions, with a total numerical strength of over 3,250 officers and men. Each county in the state had at least one company and one platoon stationed within its borders. The State Militia was armed by the federal government. In addition to the New Jersey State Militia, the state incorporated local home guard units, which were locally armed and equipped by various individual cities, into the state's military command structure by designating such units as a part of the New Jersey State Militia Reserve. These additional forces were given official legislative recognition in 1918, and by 30 June 1918, consisted of 84 units of Home Guard, with a total strength of 6,420 men.

=== World War II ===
The New Jersey State Guard was reactivated in 1941 by executive order. By the end of December 1941, the New Jersey State Guard was on continuous duty. During World War II, the State Guard was charged primarily with the protection of vital installations, such as bridges, reservoirs, and power plants. By 1945, the State Guard had reached aggregate strength of 2,076 officers and enlisted men, with over 10,000 men serving the State Guard from 1941 through 1945. The turnover rate was extremely high; between 1 January 1942 and 30 April 1943, the State Guard, which had an authorized strength of 2,100, lost 946 members to the draft. The State Guard's composition also varied due to desegregation. In 1943, Senator William Warren Barbour lobbied for a racially mixed State Guard. Ultimately, Governor Alfred E. Driscoll eventually ordered racial integration within the New Jersey State Guard.

== Legal status ==
Each state has the legal authority to maintain its own state defense force, as recognized by the federal government of the United States under Title 32, Section 109 of the United States Code. Twenty-three states and the Commonwealth of Puerto Rico currently maintain state defense forces. Under New Jersey law, the New Jersey State Guard as a part of the organized militia may be organized, maintained and disbanded at the discretion of the Governor at any time when additional defense forces are required and such action is not prohibited by Federal and State laws and regulations.

== See also ==
- New Jersey Wing Civil Air Patrol
- New Jersey State Guard Cadet Corps
