= New Jersey Army National Guard =

Military unit of New Jersey, United States of America

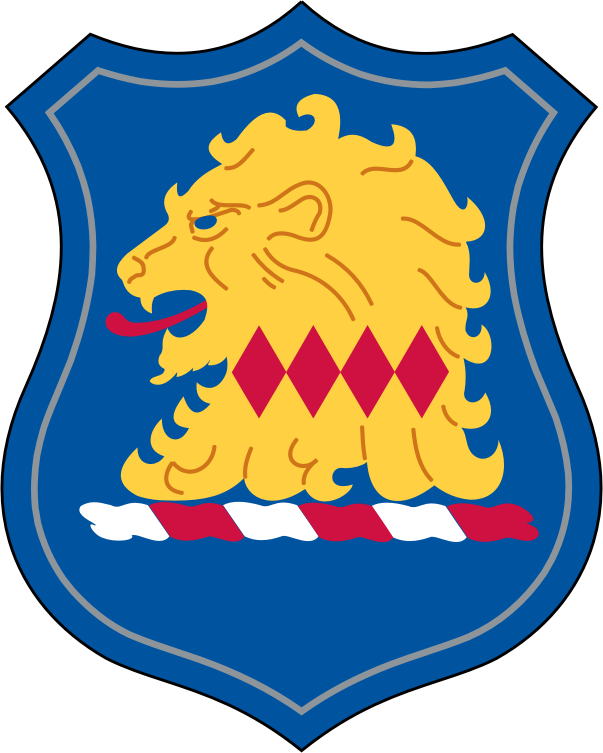
- New Jersey Army National Guard STARC SSI
- Active: 1945/46−present (as Army National Guard)
- Country: United States
- Allegiance: New Jersey
- Branch: United States Army
- Role: Army National Guard
- Part of: New Jersey Department of Military Affairs; New Jersey National Guard; United States Army; National Guard Bureau (Note: The New Jersey Army National Guard is only under the command of the United States Army if the Army National Guard units are activated by the Federal Government under the President’s invocation of the Insurrection Act of 1807.)

Commanders
- Current commander: Brigadier General Yvonne Mays; Adjutant General

Insignia
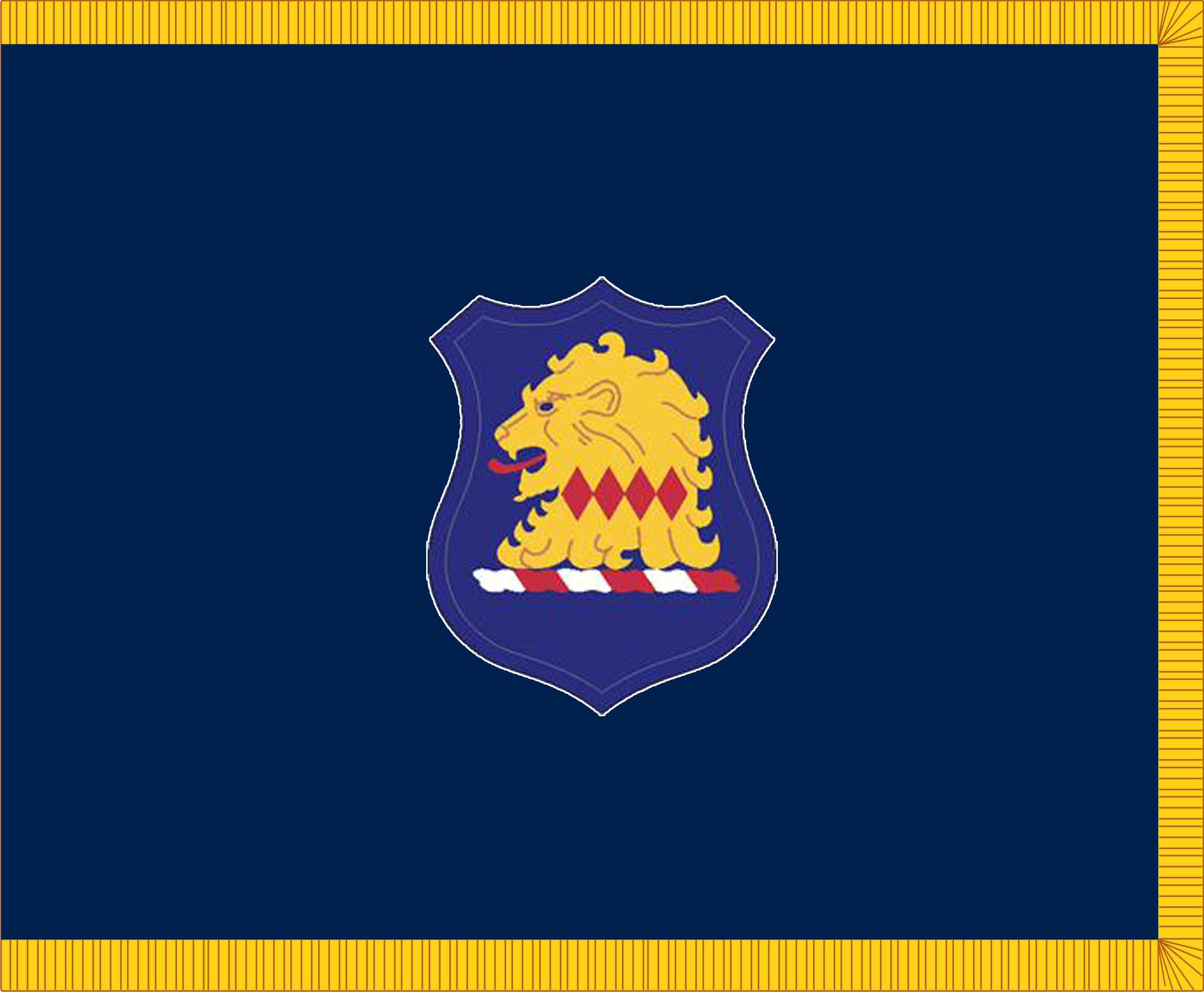
- New Jersey Army National Guard Headquarters Flag

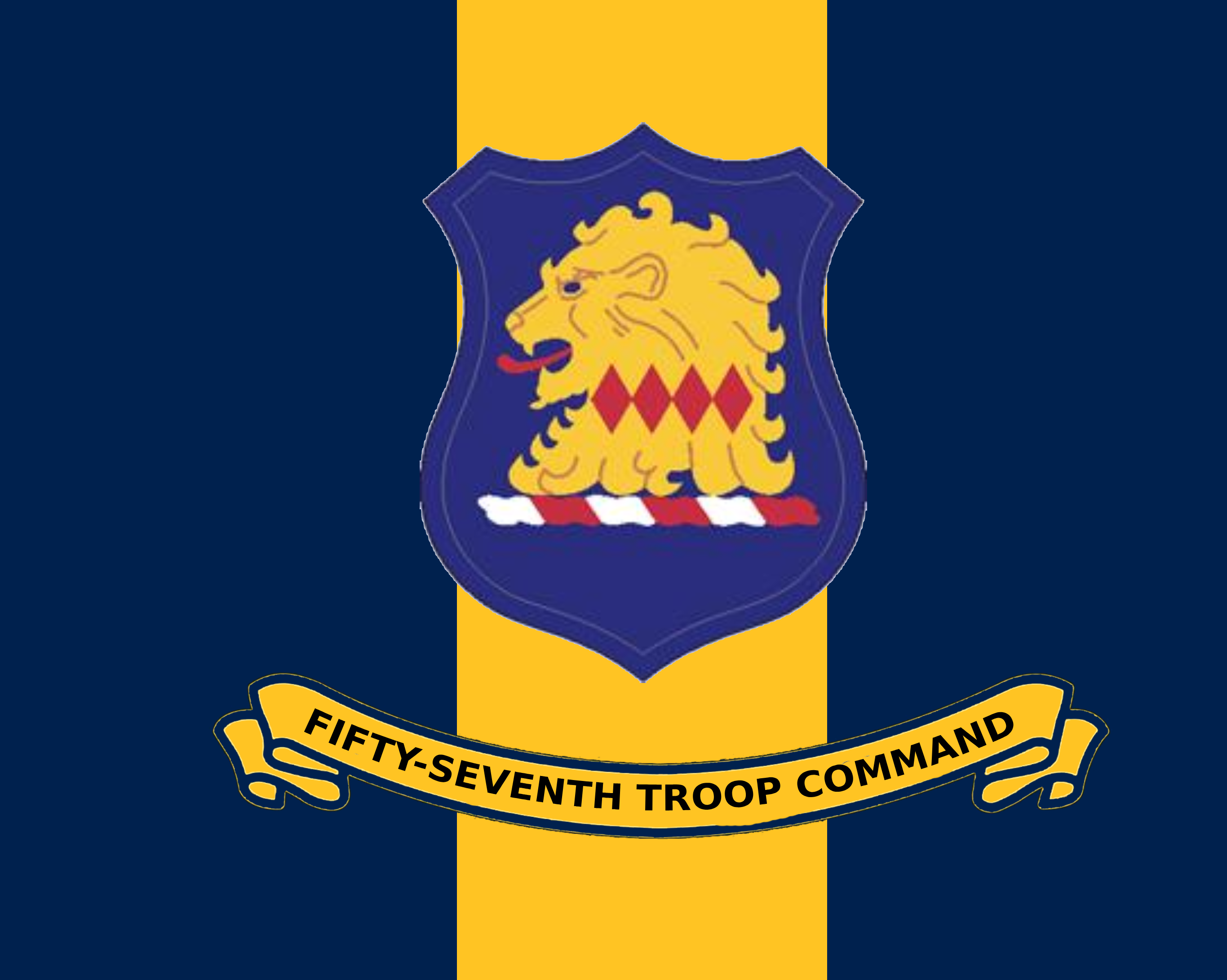
- New Jersey Army National Guard 57th Troop Command Flag

- New Jersey Army National Guard Crest

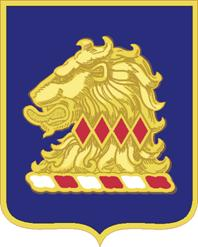
- New Jersey Army National Guard Headquarters DUI

The New Jersey Army National Guard consists of more than 6,000 citizen-soldiers. The New Jersey Army National Guard is currently engaged in multiple worldwide and homeland missions. Units have deployed to Iraq, Guantanamo Bay, Afghanistan, Jordan, Syria, Germany, Kosovo, Kuwait, Qatar, Bahrain, and Egypt. The Guard has also deployed to help with the recovery from Hurricane Irma in Texas and the U.S. Virgin Islands, Hurricane Maria in Florida and Puerto Rico, and Hurricane Katrina in New Orleans.

The New Jersey Army National Guard is governed through the New Jersey Department of Military Affairs.

On the home front, the Guard is responsible for homeland security tasks in the state of New Jersey.

The New Jersey National Guard maintains a State Partnership Program with the militaries of Albania and the Republic of Cyprus

The New Jersey National Guard contributed forces to the 44th Division when it was reformed on Oct. 19, 1920 as a result of the National Defense Act of 1920's major expansion of the National Guard. As originally conceived, the division was to consist of National Guard units from the States of Delaware, New Jersey and New York. The 57th Infantry Brigade was the New Jersey contribution. The brigade had the 113th and 114th Infantry Regiments.

The New Jersey Army National Guard maintained the 50th Armored Division in the force from 1946 to 1988, and afterwards contributed a New Jersey brigade to the 42nd Infantry Division.

Commander-in-Chief: Mikie Sherrill, Governor of New Jersey

The Adjutant General: Brig Gen Yvonne L. Mays

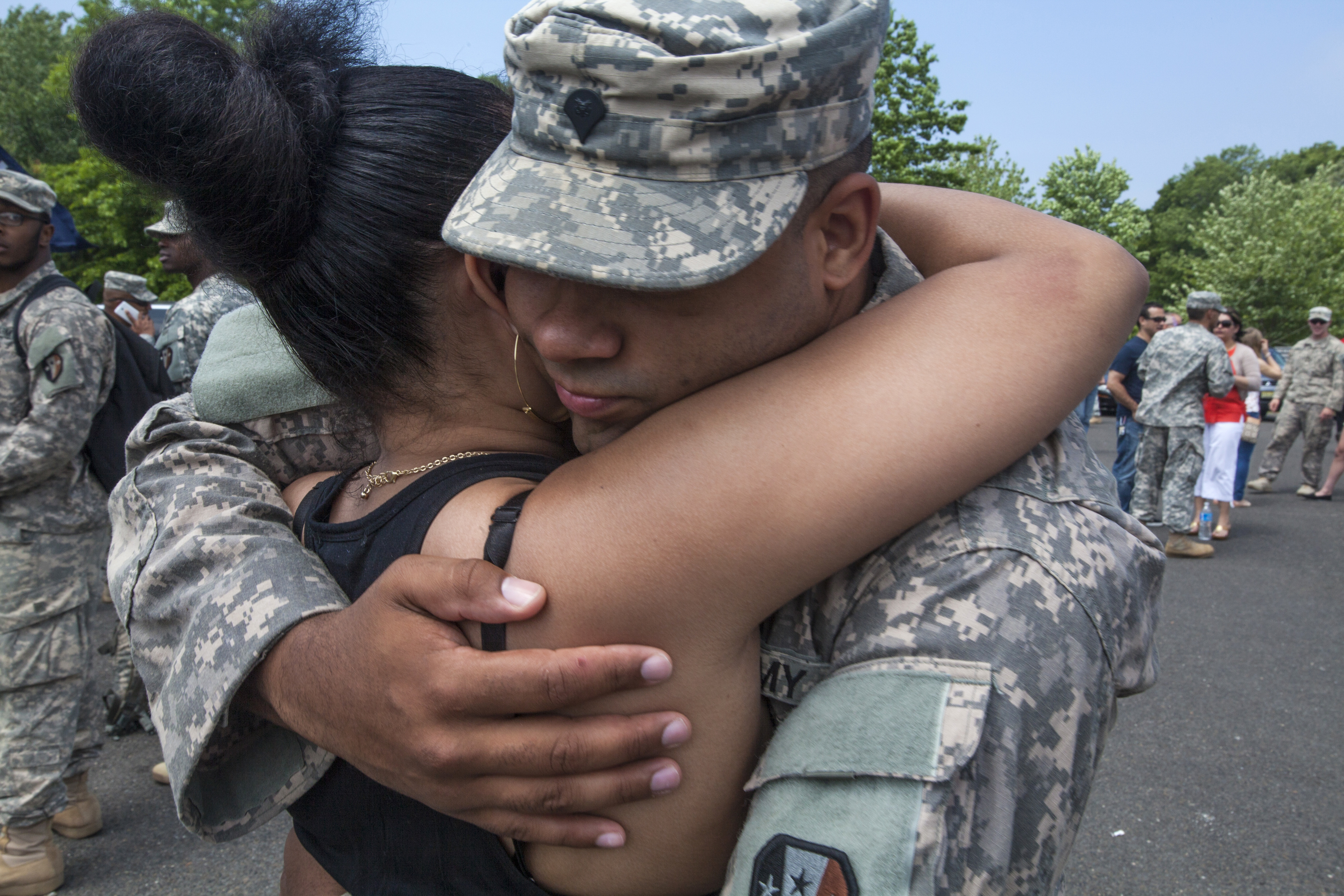
A soldier of the 1-114th Infantry reunites with his family at the Joint Training and Training Development Center, Fort Dix (Joint Base McGuire-Dix-Lakehurst), May 18, 2015. (New Jersey National Guard photo by Master Sgt. Mark C. Olsen)

== Structure ==
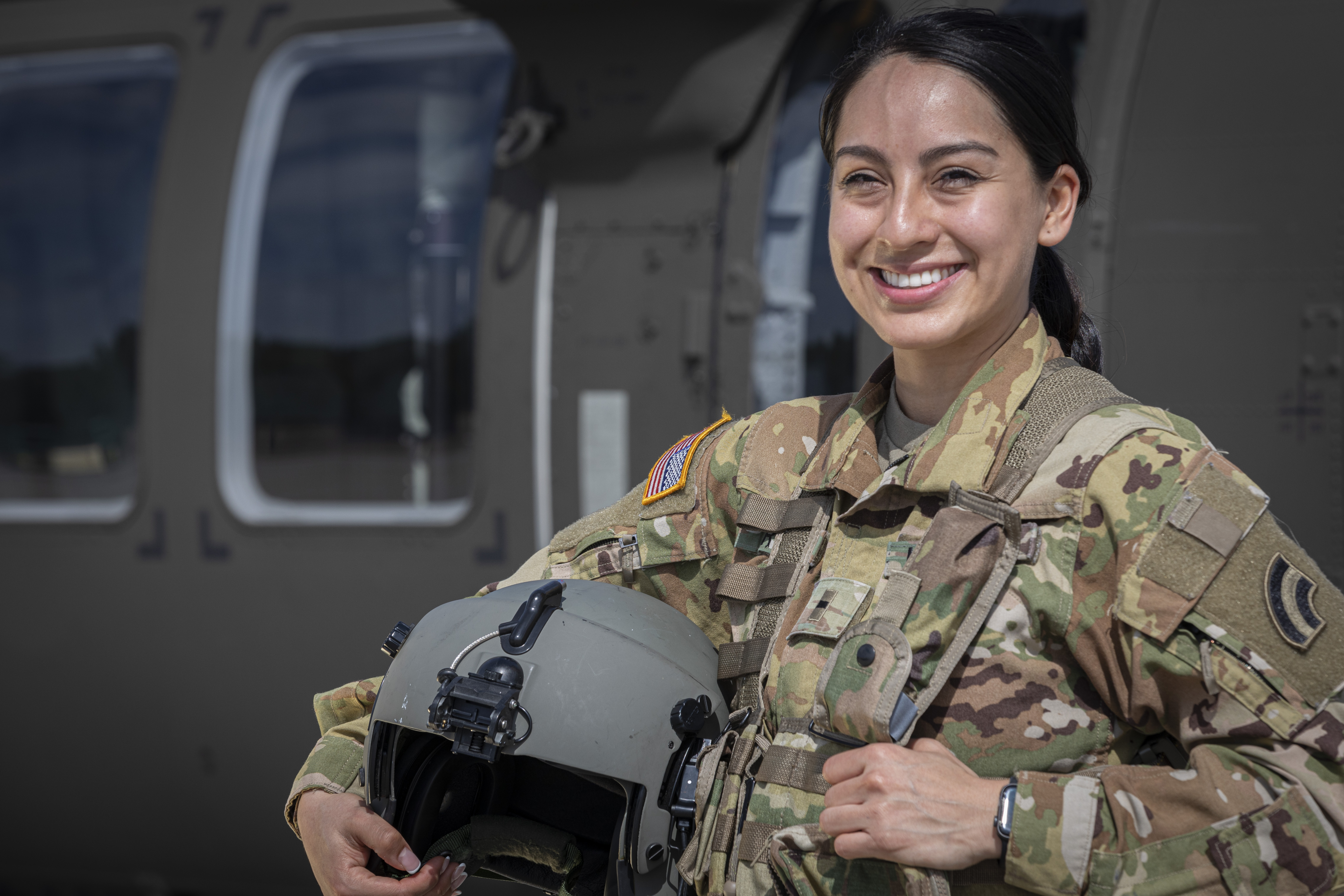
U.S. Army Warrant Officer 1 Helen Rojas, a UH-60 Black Hawk helicopter pilot, at the Fort Dix entity Joint Base McGuire-Dix-Lakehurst, New Jersey, March 19, 2021. (U.S. Air National Guard photo by Master Sgt. Matt Hecht)

- 44th Infantry Brigade Combat Team
  - 104th Brigade Engineer Battalion at West Orange
    - Company A (Engineer) at West Orange
    - Company B (Military Intelligence) at West Orange
    - Company C at Lawrenceville
  - 1st Squadron, 102nd Cavalry Regiment at Westfield
    - Headquarters and Headquarters Troop at Westfield
    - Troop A at Dover
    - Troop B at West Orange
    - Troop C at Hackettstown
  - 2nd Battalion, 113th Infantry Regiment at Riverdale
    - Headquarters and Headquarters Company at Riverdale
    - Company A at Newark
    - Company B at Jersey City
    - Company C at Woodbridge
    - Company D at Jersey City
  - 1st Battalion, 114th Infantry Regiment at Woodbury
    - Headquarters and Headquarters Company at Woodbury
    - Company A at Mount Holly
    - Company B at Freehold
    - Company C at Blackwood
    - Company D at Woodstown
  - 1st Battalion, 181st Infantry Regiment at Worcester, MA (Mass Guard)
    - Headquarters and Headquarters Company at Worcester, MA
    - Company A at Agawam, MA
    - Company B at Gardner and Greenfield, MA
    - Company C at Cambridge, MA
    - Company D at Whitinsville, MA
  - 250th Brigade Support Battalion at Teaneck
    - Headquarters and Headquarters Company at Teaneck
    - Company A (Distribution) at Teaneck
    - Company B at Manchester
    - Company C at Jersey City
    - Company D at Westfield (102nd Forward Support Company)
    - Company F at Morristown (112th Forward Support Company)
    - Company G at Vineland (114th Forward Support Company)
    - Company H at Teaneck (113th Forward Support Company)
    - Company I at Whitinsville, MA (181st Forward Support Company) (Mass Guard)
  - 3d Battalion, 112th Field Artillery Regiment at Morristown
    - Headquarters and Headquarters Battery at Morristown
      - Detachment 1, Headquarters and Headquarters Battery at Freehold
    - Battery A at Morristown
    - Battery B at Flemington
    - Battery C at Toms River
- 42nd Regional Support Group at Somerset
  - 117th Combat Sustainment Support Battalion at Woodbridge
    - 143rd Transportation Company
    - 508th Military Police Company at Teaneck
    - 50th Chemical Company at Somerset
  - 119th Combat Sustainment Support Battalion at Vineland
    - 253rd Transportation Company at Cape May
      - Detachment 1 at Atlantic City
    - 328th Military Police Company at Cherry Hill
    - 154th Quartermaster Company (Water Purification) at Sea Girt
    - 820th Quartermaster Detachment (Water Distribution) at New Egypt
  - 50th Finance Battalion at Somerset (New Brunswick)
    - 250th Finance Detachment at Somerset (New Brunswick)
    - 350th Finance Detachment at Somerset (New Brunswick)
- 57th Troop Command (HQ at Atlantic City)
  - 21st Civil Support Team at Fort Dix
  - 1st Battalion (Assault Helicopter), 150th Aviation Regiment at Lakehurst
  - Company C, 1st Battalion (Security and Support), 224th Aviation Regiment at West Trenton Armory
  - 444th Public Affairs Detachment at Lawrenceville
  - 1948th Contingency Contracting Team at JB-McGuire-Dix-Lakehurst-Fort Dix
  - 63rd Army Band at Sea Girt
- 254th Regiment at Sea Girt
  - 1st Battalion (Infantry)
  - 2nd Battalion (Modular Training Battalion)
  - 3rd Battalion (Battle Simulation Group)
- Observation Coach/Trainer (OC/T) Operations Group
- Recruiting and Retention Battalion at Sea Girt
- Joint Force Headquarters at JB-McGuire-Dix-Lakehurst-Fort Dix
- RTS-M (Regional Training Site - Maintenance) at JB-McGuire-Dix-Lakehurst-Fort Dix

== Adjutants General of New Jersey ==
- Colonel William Bott, 1776–1793
- Brigadier General Anthony Walton White, 1793–1803
- Mr. John Morgan, 1803–1804
- Brigadier General Ebenezer Elmer, 1804
- Brigadier General Peter Hunt, 1804–1810
- Brigadier General James J. Wilson, 1810–1812, 1814
- Brigadier General John Beatty, 1812–1814
- Brigadier General Charles Gordon, 1814–1816
- Brigadier General Zechariah Rossell, 1816–1842
- Major General Thomas McCall Cadwalader, 1842–1858
- Major General Robert Field Stockton, 1858–1867
- Major General William Scudder Stryker, 1867–1900
- Brigadier General Alexander Coulter Oliphant, 1900–1902
- Brigadier General Reginald Heber Breintnall, 1902–1909
- Brigadier General Wilbur Fisk Sadler Jr., 1909–1916
- Brigadier General Charles V. Barber, 1916–1917
- Brigadier General Frederick Gilkyson, 1917–1932
- Brigadier General William A. Higgins, 1932–1941
- Colonel Edgar N. Bloomer, 1941–1942
- Brigadier General James Isaiah Bowers, 1942–1947
- Major General Clifford Ross Powell, 1947–1948
- Major General Edward C. Rose, 1948–1954
- Major General James F. Cantwell, 1964–1970
- Major General William R. Sharp, 1970–1974
- Major General Wilfred C. Menard Jr., 1974–1982
- Major General Francis R. Gerard, 1982–1990
- Major General Vito Morgano, 1990–1994
- Major General Paul J. Glazar, 1994–2002
- Major General Glenn K. Rieth, 2002–2011
- Brigadier General Michael L. Cunniff, 2011–2018
- Major General Jemal J. Beale, 2018–2020
- Colonel Lisa J. Hou, 2020-2021 (Acting)
- Major General Lisa J. Hou, 2021–2024
- Colonel Yvonne Mays, 2024 (‘’Acting’’)
- Brigadier General Yvonne L Mays, (Current)

== Awards and Decorations in Order of Precedence ==

- New Jersey Distinguished Service Medal

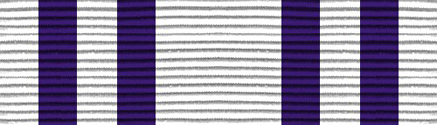

- New Jersey Medal of Valor

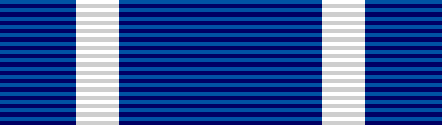

- New Jersey Meritorious Service Medal

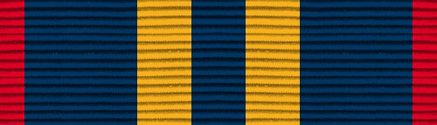

- New Jersey Commendation Medal

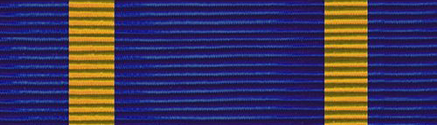

- New Jersey Ribbon of Honor

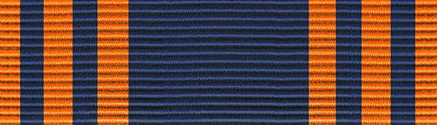

- New Jersey Good Conduct Ribbon

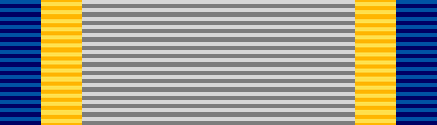

- New Jersey Merit Award

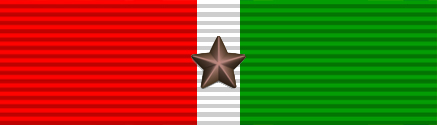

- New Jersey Desert Storm Service Medal

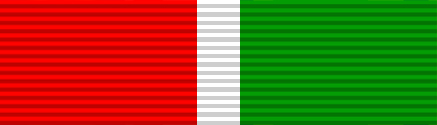

- New Jersey Desert Storm Ribbon

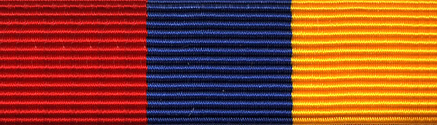

- New Jersey State Service Award

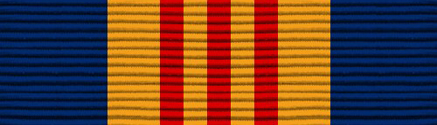

- New Jersey Recruiting Award

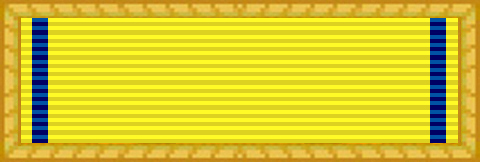

- New Jersey Governor's Unit Award

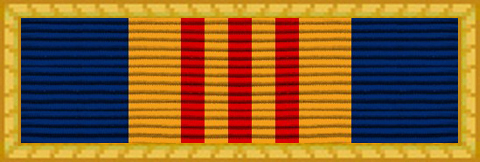

- New Jersey Unit Strength Award

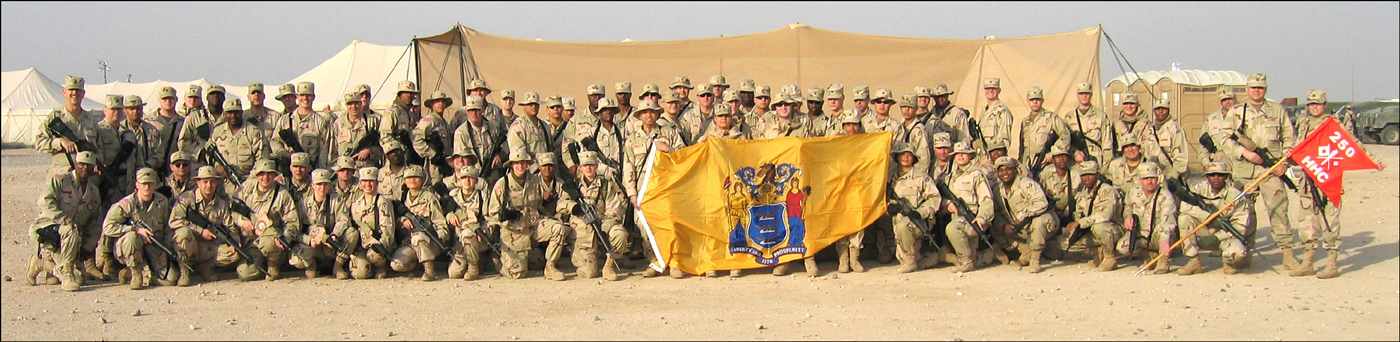
Troops of the 250th Signal Battalion in Iraq.

== Historic units ==
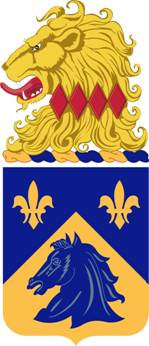
- 102nd Cavalry Regiment
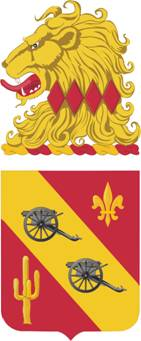
- 112th Field Artillery Regiment
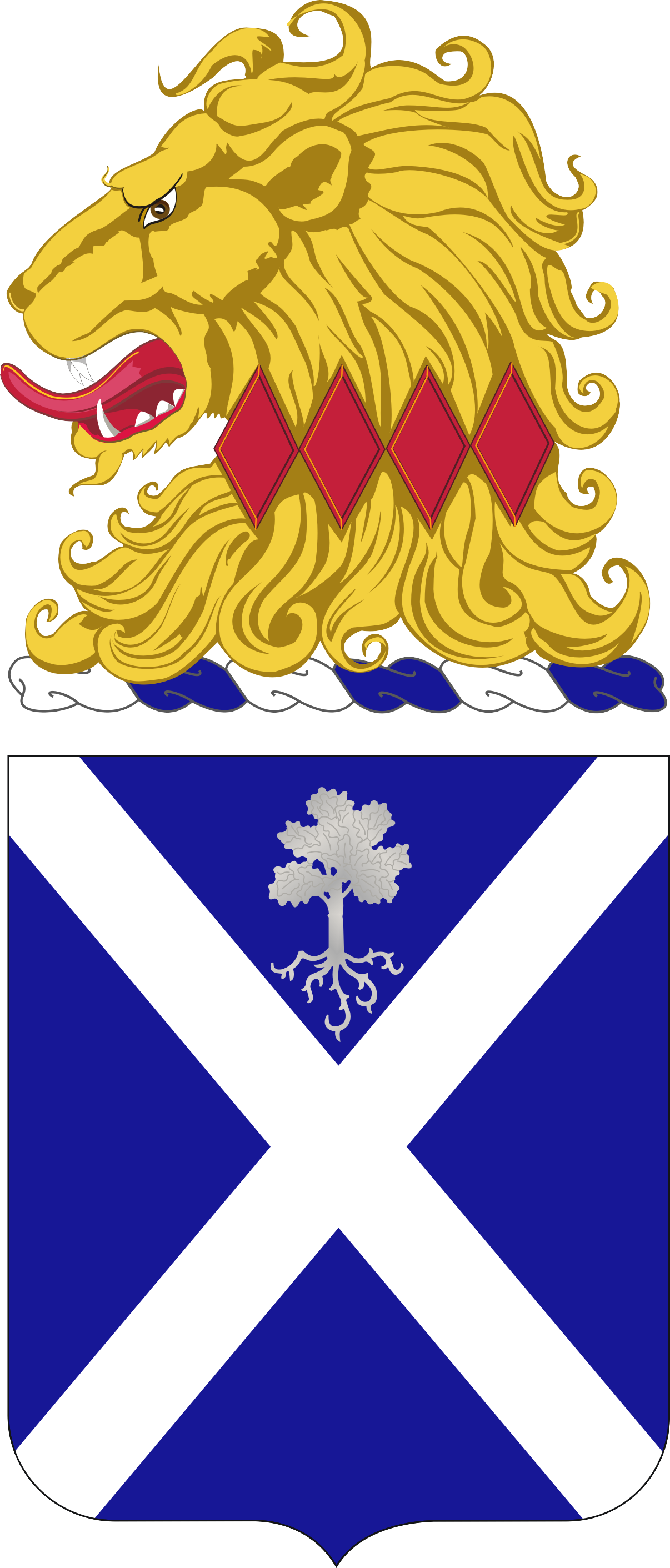
- 113th Infantry Regiment, one of only nineteen Army National Guard units with campaign credit for the War of 1812
- 114th Infantry Regiment
- 157th Field Artillery Battalion
- 157th Armored Field Artillery Battalion
- 165th Armored Field Artillery Battalion
- 199th Armored Field Artillery Battalion
- 228th Armored Field Artillery Battalion
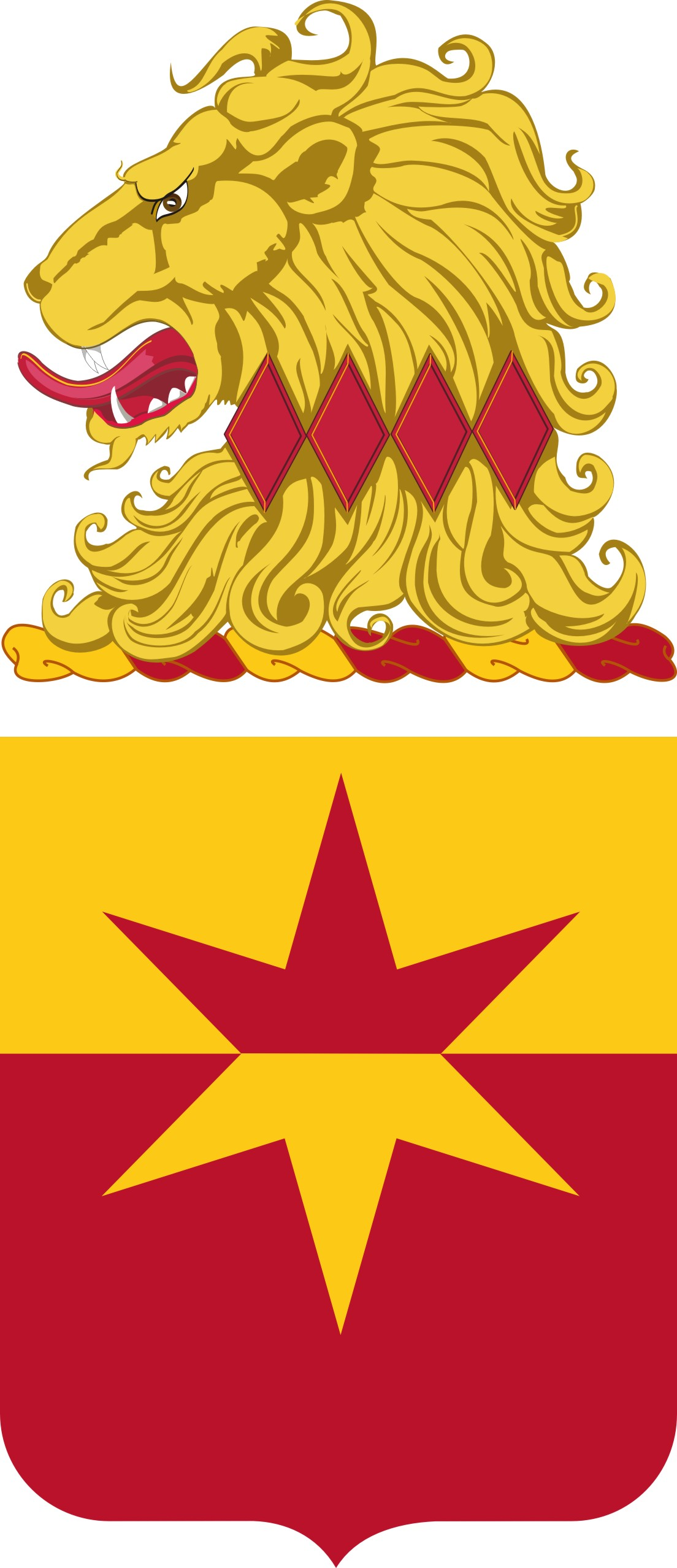
- 254th Air Defense Artillery Regiment

== See also ==
- New Jersey Naval Militia
- New Jersey State Guard
