= 71st New York Infantry Regiment =

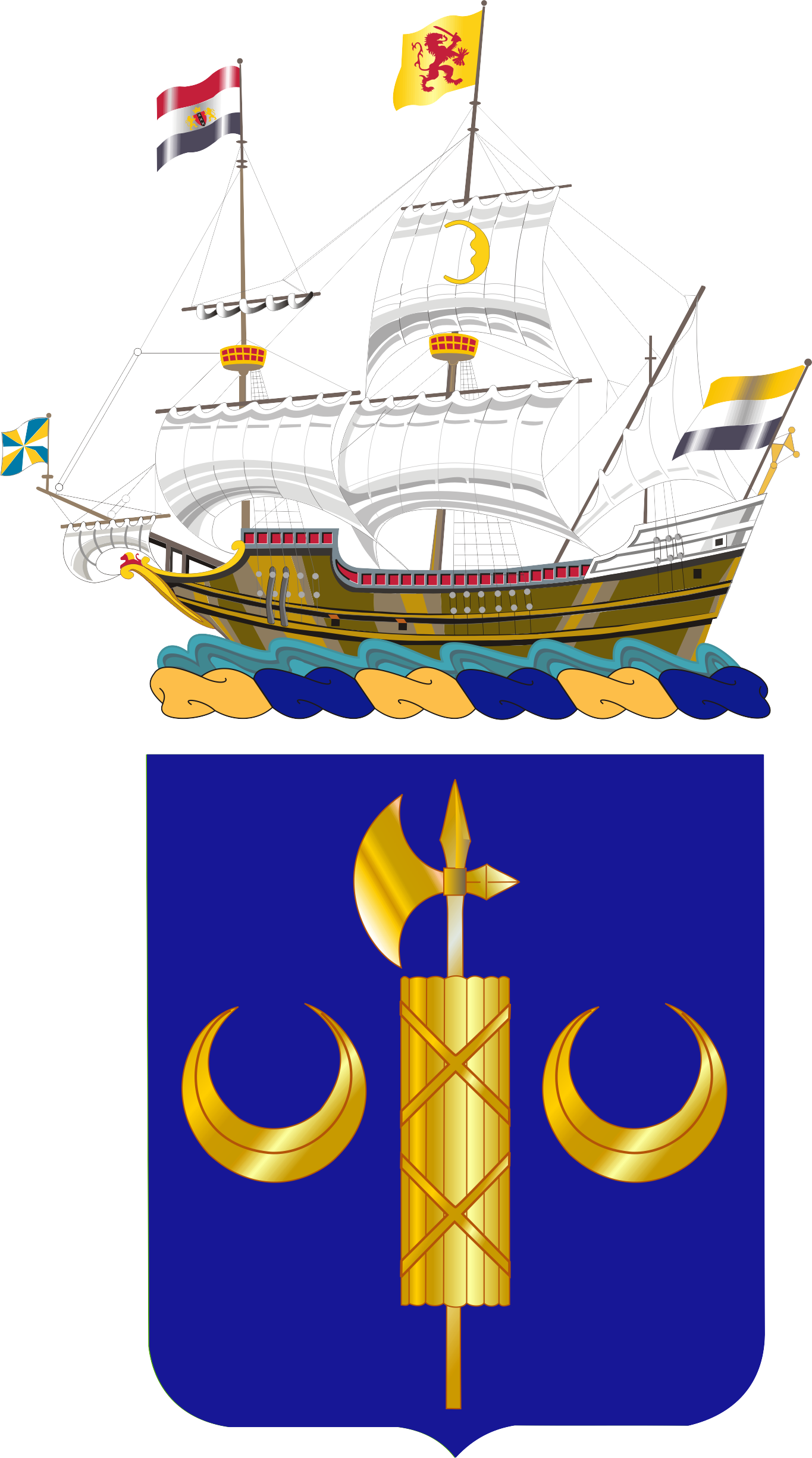
- Coat of arms
- Active: 1850–present
- Country: United States
- Branch: New York Army National Guard
- Type: Infantry
- Size: Battalion
- Garrison/HQ: New York City
- Nickname: "The American Guard"
- Motto: "Pro aris et pro focis"
- March: The Gallant Seventy-First
- Engagements: American Civil War; Occupation of Alexandria; Battle of Aquia Creek; First Battle of Bull Run; Defense of Washington; Skirmish at Oyster Point; Spanish–American War; Battle of San Juan Hill; Siege of Santiago; Mexican Expedition; World War I; World War II; Attu Island; Northern France; Rhineland; Ardennes-Alsace; Central Europe

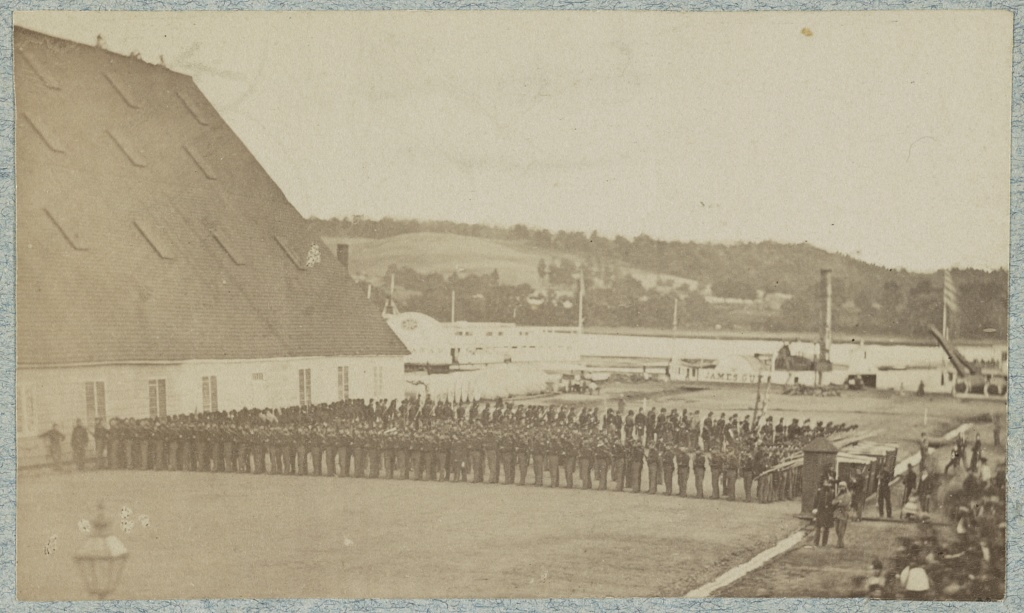
In Washington during the Civil War

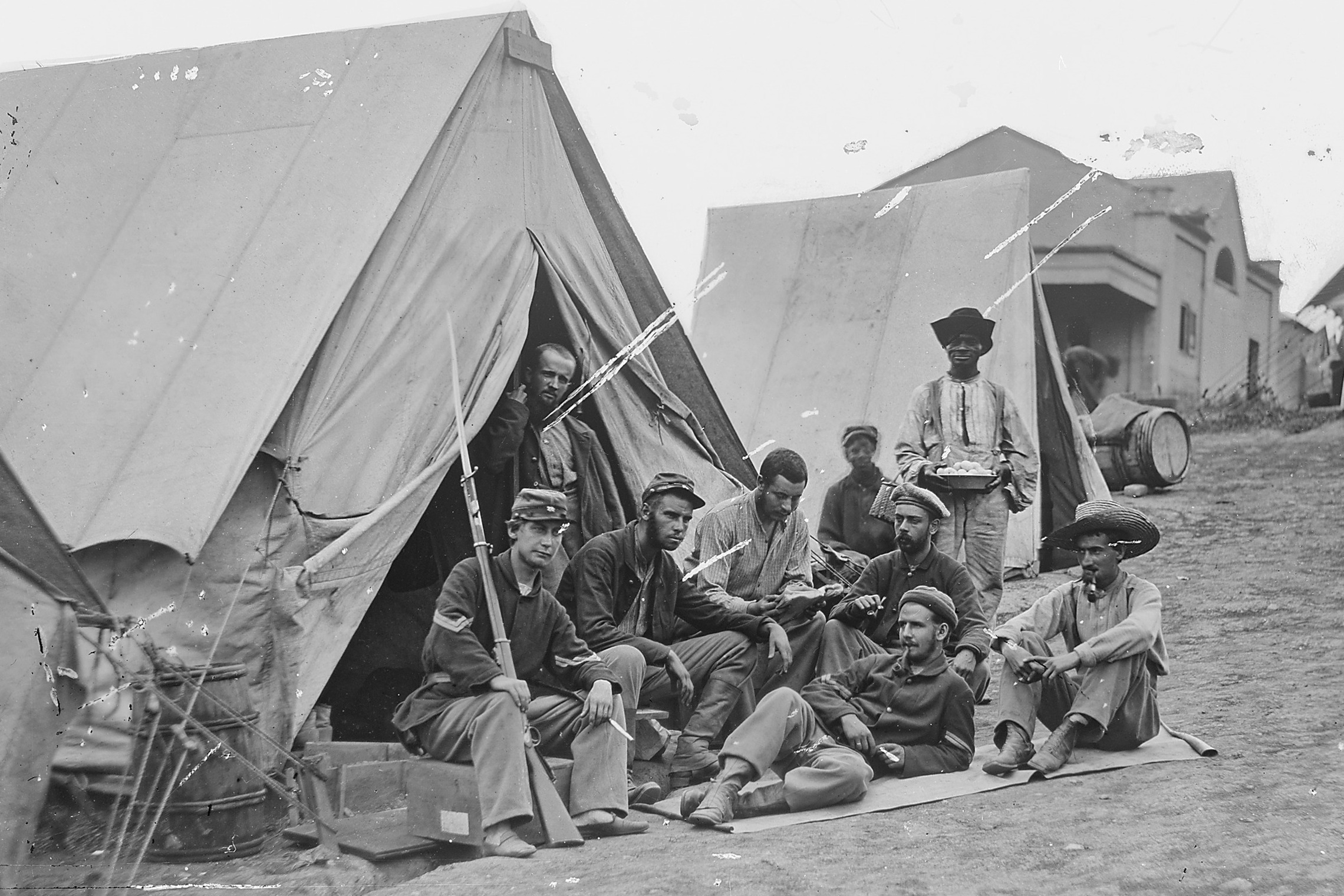
NCO and enlisted men of the 71st

The 71st New York Infantry Regiment is an organization of the New York State Guard. Formerly, the 71st Infantry was a regiment of the New York State Militia and then the Army National Guard from 1850 to 1993. The regiment was not renumbered during the early 1920s Army reorganization due to being broken up to staff other units from 1917 to 1919, and never received a numerical designation corresponding to that of a National Guard regiment.

== History ==
In the fall of 1849, the Order of United Americans, related to the Know Nothing Party, held a meeting to organize a "distinctively American regiment".

The 71st New York was formed on October 23, 1850, and was called "The American Rifles" and later "The American Guard". Originally, the founders, J.M. Parker, Hamilton W. Fish Sr, Hamilton W. Fish Jr. and William Kellock, had political links to the Know-Nothing Party. Initially there were six companies recruited. One officer in A Company, Captain Parker, resigned after hearing a "foreigner" paraded with the "American Rifles".

In Spring 1852, the American Rifles had eight companies, enough to be enrolled as a regiment of the state militia, and were assigned the regimental number of 71st. Its first commander was Colonel Abraham S. Vosburgh, previously its quartermaster. Vosburgh would remain commanding officer until his death on May 20, 1861. Henry P. Martin, previously adjutant, became lieutenant colonel in 1854. He would remain with the 71st through the first years of the Civil War. Its arsenal was located at Seventh Avenue and 35th Street.

The regiment became the "American Guard" in 1853 when their Ogden long rifles were replaced with muskets, which could carry bayonets. These, in turn, were replaced with Minie rifles in 1857.

On July 4, 1857, the regiment, along with the seventh New York, served as riot control personnel during the riots in the Sixth Ward between the Dead Rabbits and the Bowery Boys. During this action, Dead Rabbit leader Mickey Free was killed and the regiment captured an 8-lb howitzer from the rioters. The regiment was called into action again during the quarantine riot of September 1858 in Staten Island.

In 1858, the "Light Guard", New York's oldest military unit, detached from the 55th New York and became A Company. This led to some tension, because the "Light Guard" had several "foreigners" in the ranks.

=== American Civil War ===
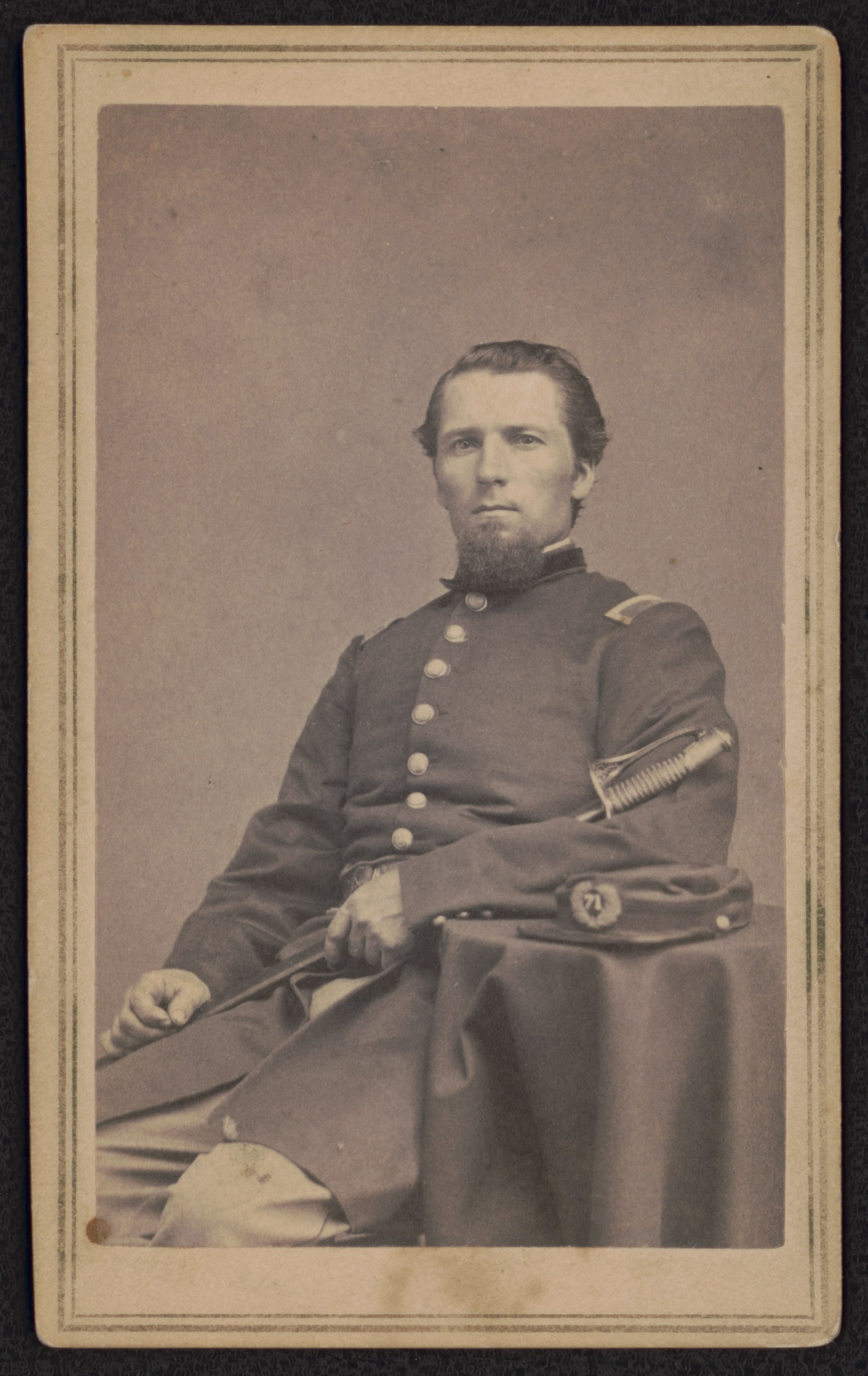
Private Eli F. Bruce of Co. E, 71st New York Infantry Regiment. From the Liljenquist Family Collection of Civil War Photographs, Prints and Photographs Division, Library of Congress

On April 16, 1861, 380 men mustered under Colonel Vosburgh at the State Arsenal, in response to President Lincoln's call for 75,000 troops. On April 21, the 71st paraded down Broadway and headed to the front.

==== Arrival in Washington ====
The 71st, then called to service for three months under Colonel Henry P. Martin, arrived in Washington on May 21, 1861, and was bivouacked at the Washington Navy Yard. While the army assembled, a team made up of members of the regiment defeated the Washington Nationals baseball club by a score of 41 to 13.

The regiment took part in the occupation of Alexandria, Virginia, in May 1861, accompanying the New York Fire Zouaves and Colonel Elmer E. Ellsworth, who was killed in the action.

A detachment of the 71st, with two howitzers, fought at Acquia Creek and Port Tobacco in May and June 1861. Private Charles B. Hall was the first man injured on any U.S. vessel in the war.

==== First Battle of Bull Run ====
The 71st New York State Volunteer Infantry was organized in the Second Brigade (Colonel Ambrose Everett Burnside) of the Second Division (Colonel David Hunter). On July 21, 1861, the 71st Infantry, under Colonel Martin's command, took part in the First Battle of Bull Run. Archaeological research on the battlefield at Manassas shows the 71st, along with the 1st and 2nd Rhode Island Infantry, faced the Tiger Rifles of Major Chatham Wheat's Louisiana Battalion, the only known unit engaged in fighting outfitted with .54-caliber muskets. The 71st supported the advance of the 2nd Rhode Island against Wheat's battalion. The Illustrated London News noted "The militia stood firm, firing and loading as if it were on parade."

Colonel Burnside's after-action report of July 24, 1861, noted:

It was nearly 4 o'clock p.m. . . . when I was ordered to protect the retreat. The Seventy-first Regiment New York State Militia was formed between the retreating columns and the enemy by Colonel Martin, and the Second Regiment Rhode Island Volunteers by Lieutenant-Colonel Wheaton.

His follow-up after-action report added, "I beg to again mention the bravery and steadiness manifested by Colonel Martin and his entire regiment, Seventy-first, both-on the field and during the retreat."

Casualties included 62 officers and men. The regiment was mustered out of service in New York on July 20, 1861. It was remustered on May 28, 1862, under Colonel Martin, and returned to the man the defenses of Washington in 1862.

==== Chancellorsville ====
Colonel Henry K. Potter commanded the 71st New York State Volunteers (distinct from the 71st NYSNG), which was placed in the Second "Excelsior" Brigade (Brig. Gen. Joseph W. Revere) of the Second Division (Maj. Gen. Hiram G. Berry) of the Third Corps (Sickles) in the Battle of Chancellorsville in May 1863.

==== Gettysburg ====
The 71st passed through Chambersburg, Pennsylvania, on June 23, 1863, it is often confused with the 71st New York Volunteers, an entirely separate, three year volunteer regiment, which fought at the Battle of Gettysburg, as part of Sickle's III Corps, again in the Second "Excelsior" Brigade (Colonel William R. Brewster). The 71st militia served in the defense of Harrisburg during the battle of Gettysburg.

==== Return to New York ====
After the battle, the 71st was recalled to New York City to help suppress the 1863 draft riots (the militia unit that was mobilized to defend Harrisburg, not the volunteer unit that was involved with the actual battle at Gettysburg). The regiment was mustered out of service in 1864. Many members of the 71st joined the 124th New York, which carried on the name "The American Guard". and took part in the Petersburg campaign. Others joined other regiments.

=== State duty ===
The 71st also served to control the Orange riots of 1871, the railroad riots of July 1877, the switchmen's strike in Buffalo of August 1892, and the motorman's strike of 1895 in Brooklyn.

In 1884, under accusations of financial mismanagement by Colonel Vose, 15 company-grade officers resigned. Colonel Vose blamed the problems on the Veterans Association.

In 1894, the 71st, under the command of Colonel Francis Vinton Greene, moved into its armory at 33rd and Park Avenue.

=== Spanish–American War ===
In the Spanish–American War, the 71st Regiment, New York Volunteers, were the first of twelve New York State regiments called to active service on May 10, 1898. The regiment entrained to Tampa on May 13, arriving on May 17. A week of confusion and quartermaster incompetence delayed their shipment to Cuba. The 71st was bivouacked along with the 1st U.S. Volunteer Cavalry, the "Rough Riders", in Tampa, who then stole a march on the 71st to steal their transport on the Tampa. The confusion of this organization was cited as one of the reasons for the 1903 reforms of the Army and National Guard.

There were ten companies of the regiment, with 1,000 soldiers, organized into three battalions.

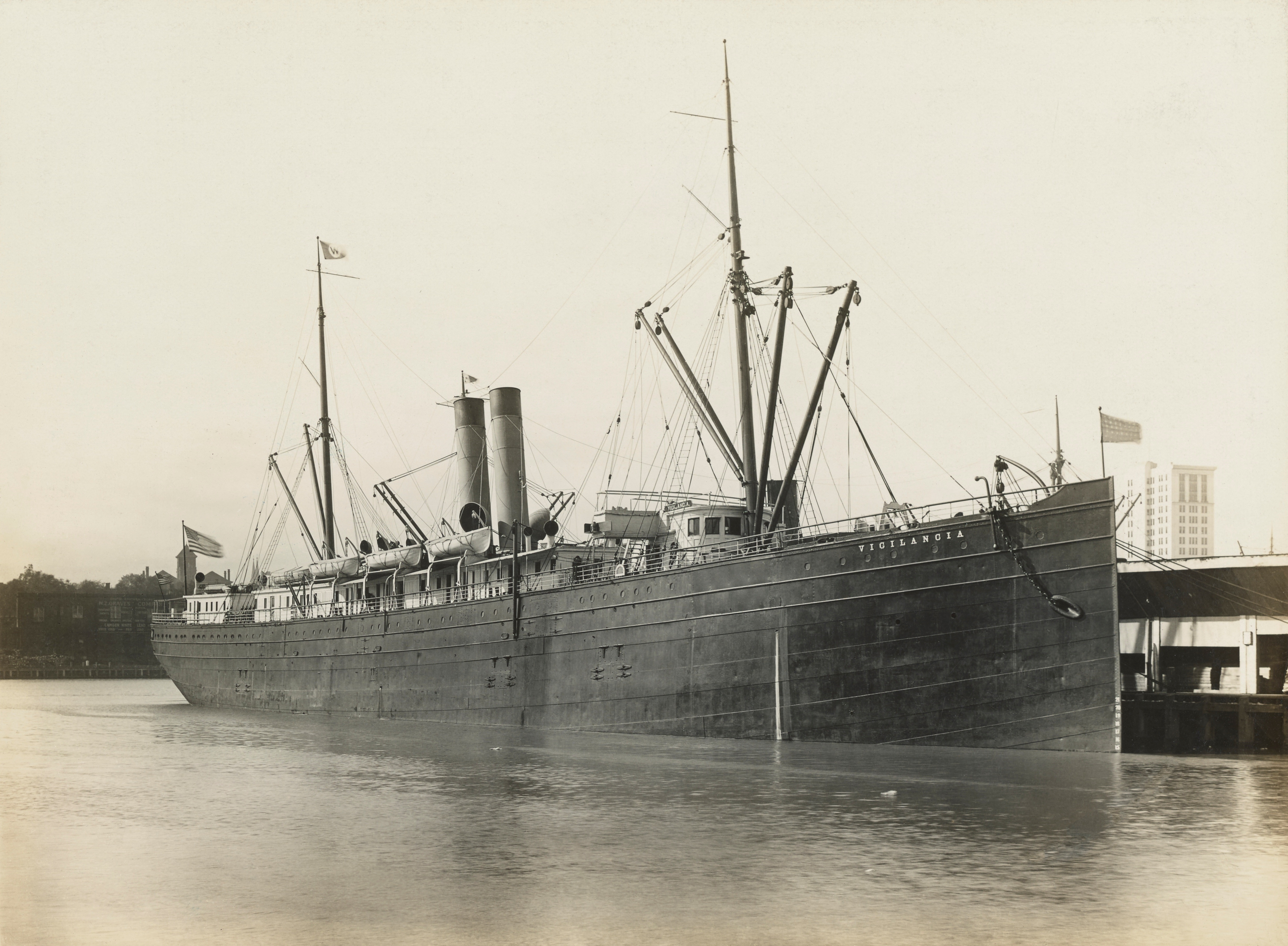
Vigilancia took the 71st to Cuba

The 71st left Tampa aboard Vigilancia on June 14, arrived off Cuba on June 22, and disembarked at Siboney, Cuba, on June 24. The 71st was brigaded with two regular regiments, the 6th and 16th Infantry Regiments in the First Brigade under Regular Army Brigadier General Hamilton S. Hawkins, as part of General Jacob Ford Kent's division, as part of the Fifth Corps under General Shafter. Although the 71st was regarded as one of the best National Guard regiments, it was equipped with obsolescent black powder rifles, and its commanding officer, Lieutenant Colonel Wallace A. Downs, reported that one-third of his men had never fired a rifle before.

The 71st was ordered to support the Rough Riders in a skirmish against Siboney's garrison, but the fighting was over before the New Yorkers could arrive. On June 27, the brigade moved towards Santiago, making slow progress over poor roads in the heat. A letter from a private in the 71st noted "Yesterday the line of march up the hill was strewn with blankets and extra clothing, even some of the 'regs' [U.S. Regulars] discarded clothes and walked in underwear."

==== The Battle of Santiago ====
The regiment took part in the Battle of Santiago (Battle of San Juan Hill), though it did not take part in the attack. By now many members of the regiment were ill with malaria. The road on which Kent's First Brigade moved forked just before coming out of forested areas, and Kent ordered the 71st to take the left-hand road to join the 6th and 16th's left flank. As the regiment left the forest, the 71st was pinned down by accurate Spanish rifle fire from the heights of San Juan hill, preventing any advance.

General Hawkins wrote later that General Kent had the 71st detached from his brigade without his knowledge and contrary to his plans and intentions. His command post was two miles (3 km) away and through a thick jungle of cactus.

Several commentators, including Lieutenant Colonel Philip Reade, Inspector General for General Kent, made disparaging remarks about the 71st's apparent lack of courage (though the malaria and heat were contributing factors). The official report of the 13th Infantry, leading Kent's Second Brigade, noted

The men of the 71st were lying flat on the ground along the underbrush bordering the road with their feet toward the middle of the road... From the remarks they made to us all along the line as we passed them at a run, I inferred that they were in this prostrate formation for the purpose of avoiding exposure to bullets.

The regiment's commander, Lt. Colonel Downs, testified at a court of inquiry in 1899 that he had received no orders to advance since 10 a.m. and therefore held his men in reserve. He said the attack by Lawton's brigade on the right had been delayed, and Downs' last orders had been to wait until Lawton's attack was successful before moving forward. Colonel Reade testified that he had to "shove" the 71st into the fight, though Company F commander Captain Malcolm Rafferty and 3rd Battalion commander Major Frank Keck responded immediately. Other men of the regiment also moved forward to join the regulars in the attack, but historian Walter Millis noted that "although the regiment as a whole soon recovered its morale, it had earned a black mark which the censorious publics who hadn't been there could not afterward forgive." Ironically, the first American soldier to reach the crest of San Juan Hill was Lieutenant Herbert Hyde True of Company L of the 71st (in Keck's battalion).

71st Infantry marching at Camp Wikoff, Long Island, NY, after returning from Cuba, September 1898. The picture shows many of the companies reduced to seven or eight men, and the whole regiment, rank and file is in a sad condition.

The Spanish garrison of Santiago surrendered on July 14, 1898. The 71st began to suffer many men sick from yellow fever and other tropical diseases. One lieutenant noted there were reports the regiment would be moved to Montauk Point, Long Island, to recuperate from the climate, and many men from the 71st were sent there to recover on the hospital ship Shinnecock.

Upon its return to New York State on August 22, the regiment could only muster 350 of its initial 1,000 men. Eighty men had been killed in the fighting around Santiago. The majority of the regiment was on sick leave or in the hospital. In October, the 71st returned to Camp Black and on November 14, 1898, the regiment was mustered out.

Following the war, a board of inquiry was held at the 22nd Regiment on the conduct of the senior officers of the regiment, including Lieutenant Colonel Clinton H. Smith, the First Battalion commander. The testimony of witnesses was favorable to Lt. Col. Smith, noting he was present on the battlefield. However, Colonel Downs and Major John Whittle resigned their commissions. Two more officers were reprimanded. The board was reviewed by then Governor Theodore Roosevelt, who noted "the greater part of the Seventy-First of their own free will took part in the storming of San Juan hill, and showed that no matter how cowardly their officers might be, they were willing to obey their country's call."

Despite the bad impression the regiment made as a whole in Santiago, many individual soldiers in the regiment were recognized for courage, including Corporal Lewis Benedict of Co. K (also in Keck's battalion), who "received a commission as lieutenant in the regular service." Major Keck received a commission as a captain in the Regular Army and served in the Philippines. After the war, Keck became prominent in New York City's social and business life. Another member of the 71st was Charles Johnson Post, who painted memorable watercolor paintings of the 71st in the 1898 war.

=== The new armory ===
The original armory of the regiment burned down in 1902. A new armory was built on the spot in 1905 by the firm of Clinton and Russell, and was noted for its particularly fine exterior architecture. This armory was used not only for military training, but many public events such as annual stamp shows.

=== World War I ===
In 1916, before the U.S. entry into World War I, the 71st was mobilized as part of the U.S. Army force serving on the Mexican border. The 71st mustered in on June 26, 1916, at New York City and mustered out at New York City on October 6, 1916. On March 25, 1917, the regiment was federalized. In August, it was required to provide 350 men to the 69th New York Infantry Regiment, which was soon to fight overseas as the 165th Infantry Regiment, part of the 42nd "Rainbow" Division

On September 30, 1917, the 71st paraded down Fifth Avenue, preparatory to its move to Camp Wadsworth, near Spartanburg, South Carolina. However, the next day, orders came from the headquarters of the 27th Division (formerly the 6th Division, the federalized "New York Division"), which was in the process of being reorganized as a "square division", at Camp Wadsworth, to break up the regiment and reassign its men (volunteers insofar as possible) to other units of the division. 22 officers and 1,375 men of the 71st went to the 105th Infantry Regiment, 158 men went to the 106th Field Artillery Regiment, and 87 men went to the 102nd Engineer Regiment. The remainder of the officers and men of the 71st were assigned to the 54th Pioneer Infantry Regiment.

A partial listing of awards and commendations earned by former 71st Infantry men during combat appears in Robert S. Sutliffe's Seventy-First New York in the World War. it includes 11 US Army Distinguished Service Crosses, 137 divisional citations, as well as 8 British decorations, 7 French decorations, 4 Belgium decorations, and Montenegrin Decorations. An incomplete listing of casualties (killed, died of wounds, disease, or accidents, or wounded) among former 71st Infantry men totals 191 killed or died, and 614 wounded.

=== Between the World Wars ===
The 54th Pioneer Infantry arrived at the port of New York on 26 June 1919 on the troopship USS Artemis and was demobilized on 8 July 1919 at Camp Grant, Illinois. It was reorganized as the 71st Infantry, New York National Guard, in 1919–20, with the regimental headquarters federally recognized on 30 January 1920 at New York City. The regiment was attached on 17 June 1922 to the separate 93rd Infantry Brigade. It was relieved from attachment to the 93rd Infantry Brigade on 12 January 1923 and attached to the 87th Infantry Brigade, 44th Infantry Division. It was assigned to the 87th Infantry Brigade on 27 February 1927, serving alongside the 174th Infantry Regiment.

The 71st Infantry participated in the parade held for Charles A. Lindbergh in New York City in July 1927. It conducted a review for Marshal Philippe Pétain of France during his visit to New York City on 24 October 1931. The regimental armory served as a homeless shelter in 1934. The regiment conducted annual summer training most years at Camp Smith, near Peekskill, New York, and conducted an additional week-long winter training directed by the War Department at Camp Dix, New Jersey, from 12 to 19 November 1939. It was inducted into active Federal service at home stations on 16 September 1940 and moved to Fort Dix, where it arrived on 23 September 1940.

=== World War II ===
In World War II, the 71st, consisting of three battalions, was part of the 44th Infantry Division, which assembled at Fort Lewis, Washington. Headquarters Company of the 1st Battalion was detached to take part in the retaking of Attu Island in the Aleutian campaign. The 102d Engr Bn (CBT) also had its Company C serving in the Pacific Campaign.

Sergeant Charles A. MacGillivary of the 71st received the Medal of Honor for actions during the German Nordwind Offensive of December 1944 near Woelfling, France, near the German border. On January 1, 1945, Sergeant MacGillivary was serving as company commander because of casualties among the officers. Ammunition was low and the company was pinned down. MacGillivary set out on his own to destroy the German machine guns menacing his company. He carried a sub-machine gun and grenades; when his submachine gun ran out of ammunition, he picked up a discarded German weapon and continued the attack. MacGillivary wiped out six German positions and killed or wounded 36 enemy. While attacking the last machine gun position, his left arm was severed by machine gun fire.

In this offensive, the 71st encountered the 17th SS Panzergrenadier Division Götz von Berlichingen, holding off eight attacks.

The Second Battalion and I Company of the Third Battatlion were both awarded Presidential Unit Citations.

In the last days of the war, the First Battalion crossed the Austrian border through a mountain pass and attacked a German division.

=== After World War II ===
The 71st was not called to active duty in either the Korean War or the Vietnam War. It was called to state active duty in April 1979 to serve as prison guards at Taconic and Bedford Hills prisons during a correctional officers' strike.

The regiment's original armory was located at Park Avenue and 34th Street in Manhattan. It later moved to 125 West 14th Street.

In 1984, the Governor of New York, Mario Cuomo, proposed disbanding the 71st and 106th Infantry to use their armory spaces for civilian purposes. The 71st Infantry Veterans' Association sued the state in court, stating that such realignment would violate state affirmative action guidelines since the 71st Infantry was predominantly black. The 71st received a favorable ruling.

On August 31, 1993, the 71st disbanded as a National Guard unit. A detachment of the battalion in Batavia, New York, was kept on active duty. The First Battalion became a State Guard unit, serving with the 14th Infantry Brigade.

== Symbols and traditions ==
The regimental nickname is "The American Guard". The regimental motto is "Pro aris et pro focis", which can be translated "For our homes and our families" but see 'Pro aris et focis'. The regimental march is "The Gallant Seventy-First".

The regimental crest is a blue shield, edged in gold, charged with gold fasces with the ax head pointing to the left, supported by two gold crescents. (This is the opposite direction from the Italian fascist symbol.)

The commanding officer of the regiment traditionally wore as his ceremonial sidearm a Colt revolver that was originally Colonel Martin's sidearm. This pistol was left with the senior officer of the regiment (or later, battalion) in the commanding officer's absence.

== Commanding officers ==
Dates in parentheses are known dates, but not start or ending dates.

- Colonel Abram S. Vosburgh, 1852–1861
- Colonel Henry P. Martin, 1861–1862
- Colonel Charles H. Smith, 1862–1863
- Colonel H.L. Trafford, 1863–1866
- Colonel Theodore W. Parmalee, 1866–1869
- Colonel Henry Rockafeller, 1869–1871
- Colonel Richard Vose, 1871–1884
- Colonel Edwin A. McAlpin, 1885
- Colonel Frederick Kopper, 1891
- Colonel Francis Vinton Greene, 1892–1898
- Colonel Johnathan T. Camp (1895)
- Lieutenant Colonel Wallace A. Downs (1898)–1899
- Colonel Walter Delamater (1936)

== See also ==
- 71st Infantry Regiment (United States)
- Joyce's 71st New York Regiment March
- Spanish American War Monument to the 71st Infantry Regiment
