= Kist =

Kist or KIST may refer to:

== Abbreviations ==
- Kigali Institute of Science and Technology, a former university in Kigali, Rwanda, now part of the new University of Rwanda
- K. International School in Tokyo, Japan
- Konark Institute of Science and Technology, a multi-disciplinary institute in Bhubaneswar, Orissa, India
- Korea Institute of Science and Technology, a multi-disciplinary research institute in Seoul, South Korea

== Boxes ==
- Cist, an ancient stone burial box, also spelt kist
- Kist, a word of Scots origin for a chest (furniture) or coffin (especially one made of stone)

== Radio ==
- KCLU (AM), a radio station (1340 AM) in Santa Barbara, California, US, which formerly held the call sign KIST for several periods until July 2008
- KOSJ, a radio station (1490 AM) in Santa Barbara, California, US, which held the call sign KIST from October 2008 to July 2010
- KIST-FM, a radio station (107.7 FM) in Carpinteria, California, US

== Other uses ==
- Kist, Bavaria, a municipality close to Würzburg in Germany
- Kist people, a Nakh-speaking ethnic group in the country of Georgia related to the Chechen and Ingush peoples
- Kist (brand), a defunct soda brand
- Kist (surname)

== See also ==
- Gold Kist, a chicken-producing company in the United States
