= Atena Beauvoir Roveda =

Brazilian writer and politician

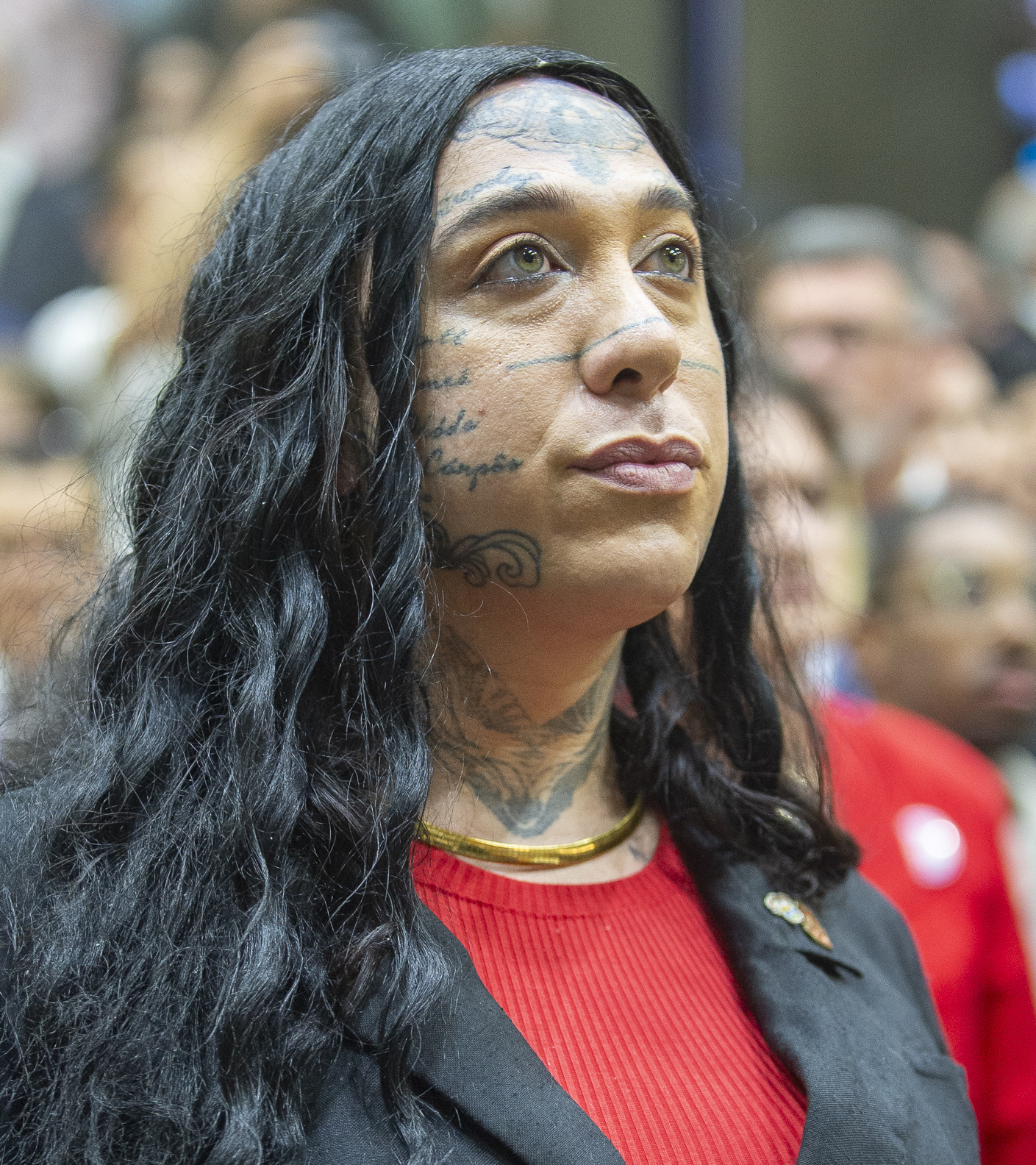

Councilwoman of Porto Alegre
- Incumbent
- Assumed office 2022

Personal details
- Born: 20 April 1991 (age 35) Porto Alegre, Rio Grande do Sul, Brazil
- Party: Democratic Labour Party (2020–2024) Socialism and Liberty Party (2024–present)
- Education: Federal University of Pelotas Federal University of Rio Grande do Sul
- Occupation: Politician; writer; anthropologist; philosopher; poet; educator

Atena Beauvoir Roveda is a Brazilian writer and politician. She became the first openly transgender councilwoman elected in Porto Alegre, the capital of Rio Grande do Sul, as a member of the Democratic Labor Party (PDT).

== Biography ==
Roveda earned a bachelor's degree in Education and Philosophy from the Federal University of Pelotas (UFPEL) and a master's degree in Anthropology from the Federal University of Rio Grande do Sul (UFRGS).

She wrote her first book, Libertê: Poesia, Filosofia e Transantropologia, in 2015, where she coined the term "transanthropology". In 2018 she published Contos Transantropológicos, a collection comprising 31 short stories.

== Political career ==
Roveda was sworn in as a councillor on the Porto Alegre City Council, replacing Councillor Márcio Bins Ely, in 2022 as a member of the Democratic Labour Party.

In 2024, Roveda joined the Socialism and Liberty Party (PSOL), through which she was re-elected the following year.
