= Lotar Siewerdt =

Brazilian scientist

- Lotar Siewerdt in August 2009
- Born: Pouso Redondo, Santa Catarina, Brazil
- Education: Texas A&M University

Lotar Siewerdt (born 1939) is a prominent Brazilian scientist in the animal sciences. He was born in the town of Pouso Redondo, state of Santa Catarina, in Brazil, the first of four children of Erwin Siewerdt and Erica Siewerdt (née Knoblauch). At age 16 he went to the famous Internato Santo Antônio in Blumenau, Santa Catarina, where he received his high school diploma with habilitation in accounting. Even as a schoolboy, he helped his parents with the small family starch business, during the school vacation months. Working in the summer months helped build his character and imbued in him a strong sense of responsibility.

In 1959 he was admitted to college and moved to Curitiba, Paraná, to attend classes at the prestigious College of Agronomy of Universidade Federal do Paraná. He transferred two years later to the Escola de Agronomia Eliseu Maciel in Pelotas, Brazil, where he graduated in 1963. He completed his formal education at Texas A&M University, College Station, TX in 1973, when he was conferred a Ph.D. in agronomy.

Siewerdt is currently an Emeritus Professor of Animal Science and Pasture Ecology. He is still associated with the Departamento de Zootecnia (Animal Science Department) of Universidade Federal de Pelotas (Pelotas, Brazil) where he was, for several decades, the leading scientist of the forage production and conservation research group. Dr. Siewerdt had a profound impact in the study and improvement of native grasslands in southern Brazil through over forty years of research and training of masters (23) and doctoral students (3). His research has concentrated on two major areas: forage production and conservation and ecology of native pastures. The efficiency of systems aimed at production and storage of hay from native pastures has been significantly improved by his research results. His over 200 peer-reviewed articles have been published in three languages covering seven countries.

In 1982–1983 he was the president of the scientific committee of the Brazilian Society of Animal Science. In the past, Dr. Siewerdt has been the Head of his department and the Administrator of the Graduate Program in Animal Science. He has served numerous times in editorial boards of scientific journals and former students of his hold positions in academia, industry and government. Before joining Universidade Federal de Pelotas, Dr. Siewerdt worked as a researcher for EMBRAPA where he served as the founding Head of the National Research Center for Beef Cattle Research in Campo Grande, state of Mato Grosso do Sul.
