= William A. Beiderlinden =

U.S. Army Major General (1895–1981)

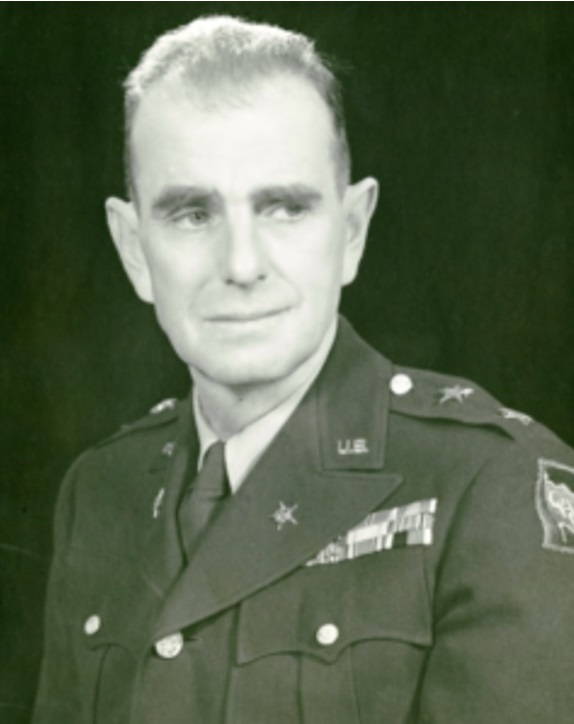
- Beiderlinden shortly after his July 1949 promotion to major general
- Born: March 4, 1895; Springfield, Missouri, U.S.
- Died: April 12, 1981 (aged 86); McLean, Virginia, U.S.
- Burial place: Arlington National Cemetery
- Alma mater: Drury College
- Spouse: Ann Symon (m. 1917–1981)
- Children: 1
- Military career
- Service: Missouri National Guard; United States Army
- Service years: 1917 (National Guard); 1917–1955 (Army)
- Rank: Major General
- Service number: O10303
- Unit: U.S. Army Field Artillery Branch
- Commands: Battery B, 83rd Field Artillery Regiment; Headquarters and Headquarters Battery, 3rd Field Artillery Brigade; 44th Division Artillery; 44th Infantry Division; Third United States Army; Joint Brazil-United States Military Commission; Military Assistance Advisory Group Brazil
- Wars: World War I Occupation of the Rhineland; World War II; Korean War
- Awards: Army Distinguished Service Medal; Legion of Merit; Bronze Star Medal; Order of Military Merit (Grand Commander) (Brazil); Order of Aeronautical Merit (Grand Commander) (Brazil)

William A. Beiderlinden (March 4, 1895 – April 12, 1981) was a career officer in the United States Army. A veteran of World War I, the Occupation of the Rhineland, World War II, and the Korean War, he served from 1917 to 1955 and attained the rank of major general. As a general officer, Biderlinden served in high-profile command assignments including the 44th Division Artillery and Military Assistance Advisory Group Brazil, and his awards and decorations included the Army Distinguished Service Medal, Legion of Merit, Bronze Star Medal, Order of Military Merit (Grand Commander) (Brazil), and Order of Aeronautical Merit (Grand Commander) (Brazil).

A native of Springfield, Missouri, Beiderlinden graduated from Drury College in 1917 and served briefly in the Missouri National Guard while attending a Citizens' Military Training Camp. After receiving his commission as a first lieutenant in late 1917, he underwent artillery training in France, then served in combat with the 30th Separate Artillery Brigade. Following post-war occupation duty in Germany, Beiderlinden returned to the United States, where his assignments included battery command and assistant professor of military science at the University of Missouri. Beiderlinden continued in assignments of increasing rank and responsibility leading up to World War II, including a posting in the Philippines.

At the start of the Second World War, Beiderlinden served in several staff roles during the army's wartime expansion. After promotion to brigadier general in 1943, he commanded the 44th Division Artillery during combat in Europe. Following the war, he served at the Army Ground Forces headquarters and at Headquarters, Far East Command. During the early stages of the Korean War, he assumed responsibility for providing troop reinforcements during combat, as well as the evacuation of non-combatants.

In 1952, Beiderlinden was assigned to Brazil as head of the Joint Brazil-United States Military Commission and commander of Military Assistance Advisory Group Brazil. He retired in June 1955, and resided in McLean, Virginia. He died in McLean on April 12, 1981, and was buried at Arlington National Cemetery.

== Early life ==
William Arthur Beiderlinden was born in Springfield, Missouri on March 4, 1895, the son of William Otho Beiderlinden and Ella May (Stover) Beiderlinden. He was educated in the schools of Springfield, and graduated from Springfield High School (now Central High School) in 1913. He then studied Pre-medical at Drury College, from which he received his Bachelor of Arts degree in 1917. While in college, Beiderlinden was president of Lambda Epsilon, an honor society for science students, as well as an assistant in the Biology department. He was offered a fellowship to study physiology at the University of Chicago, but declined in favor of a military career.

In August 1917, Beiderlinden joined the military for World War I when he enlisted as a private in the Missouri National Guard's Truck Company 5, Motor Transport Train. The unit was subsequently activated for federal service as the 110th Supply Train, and Beiderlinden continued to serve until November, attaining the rank of private first class before being discharged so he could accept a commission. He attended the Citizens' Military Training Camp held at Fort Sheridan, Illinois, where he was assigned to Second Battery, 11th Regiment. At graduation in November 1917, Beiderlinden was appointed a first lieutenant of Field Artillery in the Organized Reserve Corps.

== Start of career ==
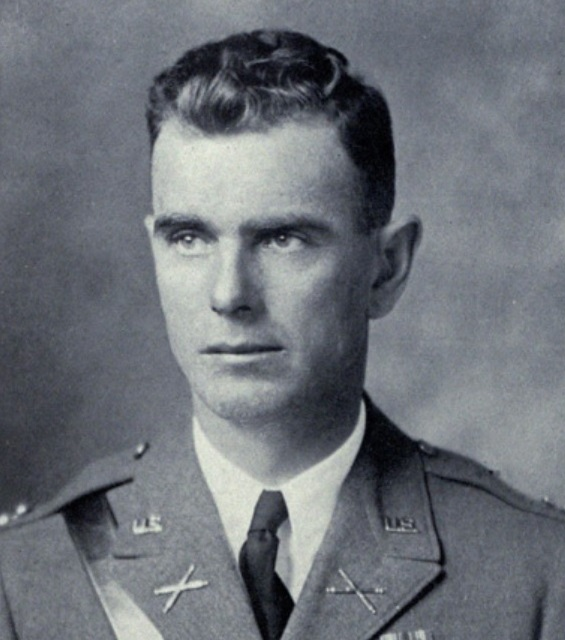
Captain Beiderlinden, Assistant Professor of Military Science, University of Missouri, 1933

After receiving his commission, Beiderlinden joined the American Expeditionary Forces in France. Upon arriving in early 1918, he attended the U.S. Army's Field Artillery school in Saumur, followed by enrollment as a student at the Coast Artillery school in Angers. Beiderlinden was then assigned to the 30th Separate Artillery Brigade, with which he served in a variety of positions on several fronts until the Armistice of November 11, 1918 ended the war. Following the conclusion of hostilities, he took part in the Occupation of the Rhineland until returning to the United States in March 1919.

Beiderlinden was assigned to the 83rd Field Artillery Regiment following his wartime service, and he received his commission as a first lieutenant in the regular army in July 1920. His regiment was subsequently assigned to Fort Benning, Georgia, where he commanded its Battery B. Beiderlinden and his wife were noted equestrians, and took part in several horse shows during the 1920s and 1930s. He was also a member of several polo teams when the army promoted the sport as a team building and leadership activity in the 1920s and 1930s.

From September 1925 to June 1926, Biderlinden was a student in the Battery Officers Course at the Fort Sill, Oklahoma Field Artillery School. After graduating, he was assigned to Fort Lewis, Washington, where he commanded Headquarters and Headquarters Battery, 3rd Field Artillery Brigade.

== Continued career ==
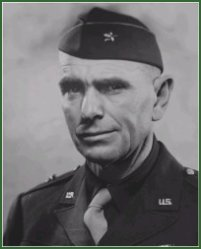
Beiderlinden as a brigadier general, circa 1943

In June 1930, Beiderlinden was promoted to captain and assigned to the University of Missouri as assistant professor of military science. While in this assignment, he coached the university's polo team, which was runner-up for the national intercollegiate championship in 1934. In November 1930, Beiderlinden sustained serious head injuries while playing polo, which required an extensive period of convalescence. In May 1931, he sustained a broken leg in another polo accident, which also required several weeks to convalesce. He remained in this assignment until 1934, when he was posted to the 24th Field Artillery Regiment, a Philippine Scouts unit assigned to Fort Stotsenburg. He served first as regimental supply officer (S-4), and later as plans, operations, and training officer (S-3) until returning to the United States in 1938.

In September 1935, Beiderlinden began attendance at the United States Army Command and General Staff College, and he graduated in June 1939. While attending the staff college, Beiderlinden received promotion to major. After graduation, he was assigned to Fort Benning as executive officer of 1st Battalion, 83rd Field Artillery. With the army expanding in anticipation of entering World War II, in June 1940 he was assigned as assistant chief of staff for plans, operations, and training (G-3) on the staff of the experimental 4th Motorized Division at Fort Benning. In April 1941, he was promoted to lieutenant colonel and assigned as the division's assistant chief of staff for logistics (G-4). The division completed its organization and training at Fort Gordon, Georgia, and Beiderlinden continued to serve as G-4 until May 1942, when he was assigned as G-4 on the staff of X Corps during its organization and training at Camp Sherman near Sherman, Texas. He was promoted to colonel in June 1942.

In February 1943, Beiderlinden was assigned to command the 44th Division Artillery at Fort Lewis, and in March he was promoted to brigadier general. In September 1944, the 44th Division completed training and organization and departed Fort Lewis for combat in France. The division took part in combat in Western Europe throughout 1944 and early 1945, and Beiderlinden became the subject of international headlines in March 1945, when he helped save Heidelberg from bombing by persuading Nazi troops to withdraw. When his command was ordered to shell the city, Beiderlinden and his division commander, Major General William F. Dean, took the initiative to contact the burgomaster and attempt to persuade Nazi soldiers to abandon their positions. Though burgomasters were forbidden from conducting such talks, Heidelberg's burgomaster ignored warnings from the local Nazi gauleiter and discussed the matter with Beiderlinden, who was fluent in German. The negotiations focused on the importance of sparing Heidelberg University and other historic and culturally significant sites. Beiderlinden and the burgomaster agreed to terms, and the Nazis spared the city by evacuating.

== Later career ==
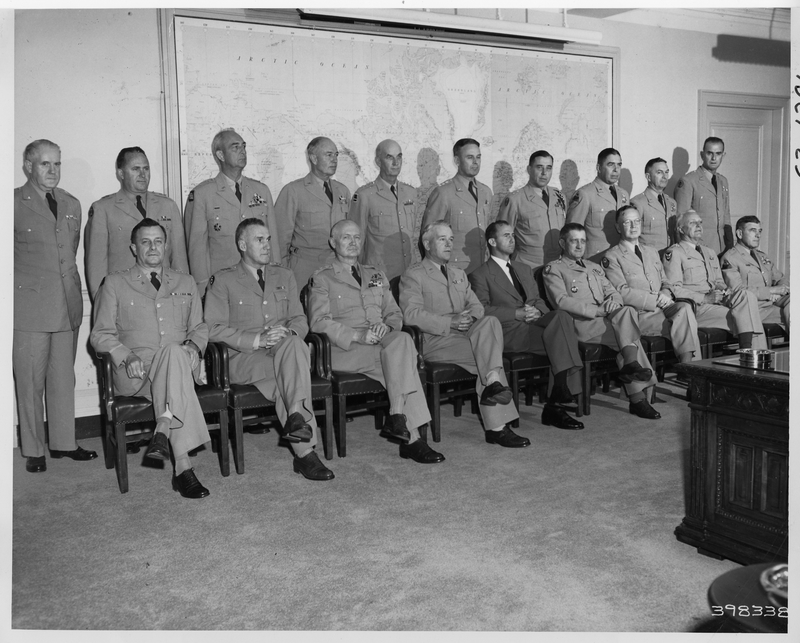
Secretary of the Army Frank Pace with senior army commanders, June 1952. Beiderlinden is standing at far right.

In July 1945, the 44th Division returned to the United States to begin preparing for service in the Pacific theater, but the Japanese surrender in August eliminated the need for its continued service, and Biderlinden acted as division commander from 1 November until shortly before the division was inactivated later that month. After the war, Beiderlinden was assigned to Army Ground Forces as deputy chief of the personnel section. In June 1946, he was assigned as assistant to the deputy chief of staff at General Headquarters, Far East Command in Japan. In July 1949, he was promoted to major general. During the Korean War, Beiderlinden served as Assistant Chief of Staff for Far East Command, then as deputy chief of staff for personnel (G-1) for the United Nations Command. In the early stages of the fighting, Beiderlinden was responsible for providing reinforcements to U.S. forces in Korea and evacuating non-combatants. As the conflict continued, he also initiated a rotation program that ensured continuity between soldiers departing Korea at the end of their duty and the replacements who took their place.

In May 1951, Beiderlinden was assigned as deputy commander of Third United States Army at Fort McPherson, Georgia. In June 1951, Drury College named him a Distinguished Alumni. In May 1952, Beiderlinden became acting commander of Third Army, and he served until the arrival of a permanent replacement in September.

Beiderlinden served in Brazil from 1952 to 1955, holding the positions of head of the Joint Brazil-United States Military Commission and Military Assistance Advisory Group Brazil. He was commended for his work to improve U.S-Brazil military relations, and his success was recognized when Brazil's military awarded him honorary graduate status of that country's Escola Superior de Guerra. He returned to the United States in April 1955 and retired in June.

== Awards ==
Beiderlinden's U.S. awards and decorations included the Army Distinguished Service Medal, Legion of Merit, and Bronze Star Medal. In addition, he received from Brazil the Order of Military Merit (Grand Commander) and Order of Aeronautical Merit (Grand Commander).

The citation for Beiderlinden's Distinguished Service Medal reads:

The President of the United States of America, authorized by Act of Congress July 9, 1918, takes pleasure in presenting the Army Distinguished Service Medal to Major General William A. Beiderlinden (ASN: 0-10303), United States Army, for exceptionally meritorious and distinguished services to the Government of the United States, in a duty of great responsibility in Korea, from June 1950 to May 1951. During the early crucial stages of the Korean campaign, he initiated the prompt readjustment of military and civilian personnel to meet the strong challenge inherent in sudden armed conflict. He evolved a system that continuously provided reinforcements to units in Korea and superbly directed the evacuation to Japan of non-Korean nationals whose survival was threatened by the invading forces. His keen foresight early in the campaign enabled him to direct the initiation of a combat rotation program which, when the situation in Korea permitted, was ready for immediate implementation. Gen. Beiderlinden's extraordinary professional competence and unremitting devotion to duty contributed conspicuously to the success of military operations in Korea, reflecting great credit upon himself and upholding the esteemed traditions of the military service.
General Orders: Department of the Army, General Orders No. 40 (June 4, 1951) (Note: Beiderlinden's Distinguished Service Medal superseded a previous award of the Silver Star for gallantry during September and October 1950. The Silver Star had been published in General Orders 71, General Headquarters, Far East Command, dated 26 November 1950.)

== Retirement and death ==
In retirement, Beiderlinden was a resident of McLean, Virginia. He died in McLean on April 12, 1981. He was buried at Arlington National Cemetery.

== Family ==
In November 1917, Beiderlinden married Ann Symon, whom he had met when both attended Drury College. They were married until his death, and were the parents of a daughter, Janet.
