= 44th Infantry Division (United States) =

- Divisional shoulder patch.
- Active: 19 October 1920–30 November 1945; 14 October 1946–December 1954
- Country: United States
- Branch: United States Army
- Type: Infantry
- Size: Division
- Motto: Prepared in all things
- Engagements: World War II; Northern France; Rhineland; Ardennes-Alsace; Central Europe
- Decorations: Distinguished Unit Citation (3)

Commanders
- Notable commanders: Maj. Gen. William F. Dean; Maj. Gen. Harry K. Bolen; Brig. Gen. Robert F. Sink

The 44th Infantry Division was a division of the United States Army National Guard from October 1920 to November 1945, when it was inactivated after Federal Service during World War II. A second 44th Infantry Division existed in the Illinois Army National Guard from 1946 until October 1954, when that division was disbanded after federal service during the Korean War.

== History ==
=== Formation and interwar period ===
Originally named the 44th Division, it was constituted on 19 October 1920 as a result of the National Defense Act of 1920's major expansion of the National Guard. As originally conceived, the division was to consist of National Guard units from Delaware, New Jersey and New York, and was to form part of the Second Corps Area. However, only individual members of the division staff, and not any whole units, ended up being assigned to the state of Delaware. The 57th Infantry Brigade from the New Jersey National Guard and the 87th Infantry Brigade of the New York National Guard were incorporated and growth continued piecemeal as subordinate units were organized until 1940. The shoulder sleeve insignia (unit patch) of the 44th Division was approved by the Secretary of War on 5 October 1921. The division headquarters was organized and federally recognized on 26 March 1924.

The headquarters was relocated on 21 February 1925 to Newark, New Jersey, and back to Trenton on 5 October 1936. The designated mobilization training center for the 44th Division was Camp Dix, New Jersey. The division staff, composed of personnel from all three states, came together each summer to conduct joint training at the New Jersey National Guard camp at Sea Girt, also where the New Jersey elements conducted summer camp every year. The New York units held their training at Camp Smith, near Peekskill, New York. The division staff participated in the First Army command post exercise at Camp Dix in 1931 and 1934 and at Fort Devens in 1936 and 1937. The division was assembled for the first time in August 1935 when it participated in the First and Second Corps Area phase of the First Army Maneuvers at Pine Camp, New York. In 1939, the division again participated in the First Army Maneuvers, this time at Plattsburg, New York, as part of the provisional II Corps. The 44th Division's last major training event before induction was the First Army maneuver involving the provisional I, II, and III Corps near Canton, New York, in August 1940.

=== World War II ===
==== WWII division organization ====
===== Square division =====
On 16 September 1940, the 44th Division was inducted into federal service at home stations. It was one of four National Guard divisions to be inducted into federal service for a one-year period that day. The other divisions were the 30th Division, 41st Division and 45th Division. After being inducted into federal service the he 44th Division moved to Camp Dix in New Jersey, where it arrived on 23 September 1940. At the time the division still retained its World War I square organization and consisted of the following units.

44th Division square organization (click to enlarge)

- 44th Division, in Trenton (NJ)
  - 44th Division Headquarters
  - 57th Infantry Brigade, in Trenton (NJ)
    - Headquarters and Headquarters Company
    - 113th Infantry Regiment, in Newark (NJ)
      - Headquarters and Headquarters Company
      - 3× Infantry battalions
        - each battalion consists of: 1× Headquarters and Headquarters Detachment, 3× Rifle companies, 1× Weapons Company
      - Anti-Tank Company (M3 37mm Anti-Tank guns)
      - Service Company
    - 114th Infantry Regiment, in Camden (NJ)
      - same organization as 113th Infantry Regiment
  - 87th Infantry Brigade, in New York City (NY)
    - Headquarters and Headquarters Company
    - 71st Infantry Regiment, in New York City (NY)
      - same organization as 113th Infantry Regiment
    - 174th Infantry Regiment, in Buffalo (NY)
      - same organization as 113th Infantry Regiment
  - 69th Field Artillery Brigade, in Camden (NJ)
    - Headquarters and Headquarters Battery
    - 156th Field Artillery Regiment, in Newburgh (NY)
      - Headquarters and Headquarters Battery
      - 2× Light Field Artillery battalions
        - Headquarters and Headquarters Battery
        - 3× Howitzer batteries (M1897 75mm field guns), replaced by M2 105mm towed howitzers in 1941)
        - Service Battery
    - 157th Field Artillery Regiment, in Camden (NJ)
      - Headquarters and Headquarters Battery
      - 2× Medium Field Artillery battalions
        - Headquarters and Headquarters Battery
        - 3× Howitzer batteries (M1918 155mm towed howitzers, replaced by M1 155mm towed howitzers in 1941)
        - Anti-Tank Battery (M1897 75mm anti-tank guns)
        - Service Battery
    - 165th Field Artillery Regiment, in Trenton (NJ)
      - same organization as 157th Field Artillery Regiment
  - 104th Engineer Regiment, in Teaneck (NJ)
    - Headquarters and Headquarters and Service Company
    - 2× Engineer battalions
      - each battalion consists of: 1× Headquarters, 3× Engineer companies
  - 119th Medical Regiment, in Trenton (NJ)
    - Headquarters and Headquarters and Service Company
    - Collecting Battalion
      - battalion consists of: 1× Headquarters, 3× Collecting companies
    - Ambulance Battalion
      - battalion consists of: 1× Headquarters, 3× Ambulance companies
    - Clearing Battalion
      - battalion consists of: 1× Headquarters, 3× Clearing companies
  - 119th Quartermaster Regiment, in Trenton (NJ)
    - Headquarters and Headquarters Company
    - 2× Truck battalions
      - each battalion consists of: 1× Headquarters, 2× Truck companies
    - Light Maintenance and Car Battalion
      - battalion consists of: 1× Headquarters, 1× Light Maintenance Company, 1× Car Company
    - Service Company
  - Headquarters, Special Troops, in Orange (NJ)
    - Headquarters Company, 44th Division, in Plainfield (NJ)
    - 44th Signal Company, in Orange (NJ)
    - 119th Ordnance Company, in Trenton (NJ)
    - 44th Military Police Company, in Orange (NJ)

Immediately before the induction of the 44th Division into federal service, the 44th Tank Company was disbanded and its personnel was assigned to other units of the 44th Division Special Troops. After the division's initial train-up period, the 44th Division participated in the First Army Carolina Maneuvers near Wadesboro, North Carolina, in October–November 1941. The division was en route to New Jersey on 7 December 1941, returning to Fort Dix when news was heard of the Japanese attack on Pearl Harbor. A regimental combat team, based on the 113th Infantry Regiment, was immediately detached from the division and attached to the Eastern Defense Command to provide ground forces for the defense of the East Coast from New York to Philadelphia. Shortly afterwards, the remainder of the division moved to Camp Claiborne in Louisiana.

===== Triangular division =====
On 16 February 1942, as a part of an Army-wide reorganization of National Guard divisions, the 44th Division was reorganized as a triangular division. The division's two brigade headquarters were disbanded in favor of a structure containing three separate regimental commands reporting directly to the division headquarters, as well as four field artillery battalions under a division artillery headquarters, with the engineer, medical, and quartermaster regiments also reduced to battalions. On 19 February 1942, the regiment was officially relieved from assignment to 44th Division and assigned to the General Headquarters Reserve. With the reorganization the division was renamed 44th Infantry Division. Afterwards the 44th Infantry Division was composed of the following units:

44th Infantry Division triangular organization (click to enlarge)

- 44th Infantry Division
  - 44th Infantry Division Headquarters
  - 44th Cavalry Reconnaissance Troop (Mechanized) (M3 scout cars and then M8 Greyhound armored cars)
  - 71st Infantry Regiment
    - Headquarters and Headquarters Company
    - 3× Infantry battalions
      - each battalion consists of: 1× Headquarters and Headquarters Company, 3× Rifle companies, 1× Heavy Weapons Company
    - Cannon Company (T12 Gun Motor Carriages and T19 Howitzer Motor Carriages, later replaced by either M3 105mm towed howitzers or M7 Priest self propelled howitzers)
    - Anti-Tank Company (M3 37mm anti-tank guns, which were replaced by 1944 with M1 57mm anti-tank guns)
    - Service Company
  - 114th Infantry Regiment (relieved from assignment to the division on 27 January 1943)
    - same organization as 71st Infantry Regiment
  - 114th Infantry Regiment
    - same organization as 71st Infantry Regiment
  - 324th Infantry Regiment (assigned to division on 1 February 1943)
    - same organization as 71st Infantry Regiment
  - 44th Infantry Division Artillery
    - Headquarters and Headquarters Battery
    - 156th Field Artillery Battalion
      - Headquarters and Headquarters Battery
      - 3× Batteries (M2 105mm towed howitzers)
      - Service Battery
    - 157th Field Artillery Battalion
      - Headquarters and Headquarters Battery
      - 3× Batteries (M1 155mm towed howitzers)
      - Service Battery
    - 217th Field Artillery Battalion
      - same organization as 156th Field Artillery Battalion
    - 220th Field Artillery Battalion
      - same organization as 156th Field Artillery Battalion
  - Headquarters Special Troops
    - Headquarters Company, 44th Infantry Division
    - 44th Signal Company
    - 44th Quartermaster Company
    - 744th Ordnance Light Maintenance Company
    - 119th Military Police Platoon
    - 44th Infantry Division Band (attached)
  - 44th Quartermaster Battalion (Between September and November 1942 Quartermaster battalions were disbanded and their platoons used to form a Quartermaster Company and an Ordnance Company, which were both assigned to Headquarters Special Troops)
    - Headquarters and Headquarters Company (includes a service platoon and a maintenance platoon)
    - Truck Company
  - 63rd Engineer Combat Battalion
    - Headquarters and Headquarters and Service Company
    - 3× Engineer combat companies
  - 119th Medical Battalion
    - Headquarters and Headquarters Detachment
    - 3× Collecting companies
    - Clearing Company

The division was then sent to Fort Lewis, Washington, where it participated in defense of the West Coast under the Western Defense Command for the remainder of 1942. In February 1943, the 44th Infantry Division, much reduced through the loss of personnel and units entered a period of rebuilding and training. After completing the "D-Series", division-level training, the 44th was sent to participate in the multi-division Fourth Army #6 Louisiana Maneuvers, 7 February-3 April 1944. The division then moved to Camp Phillips, Kansas, for its final pre-deployment preparations. The division moved by railroad to Camp Myles Standish, Massachusetts, arriving on 24–27 August 1944; departing the United States via the Boston Port of Embarkation on 5 September 1944.

==== Combat chronicle ====
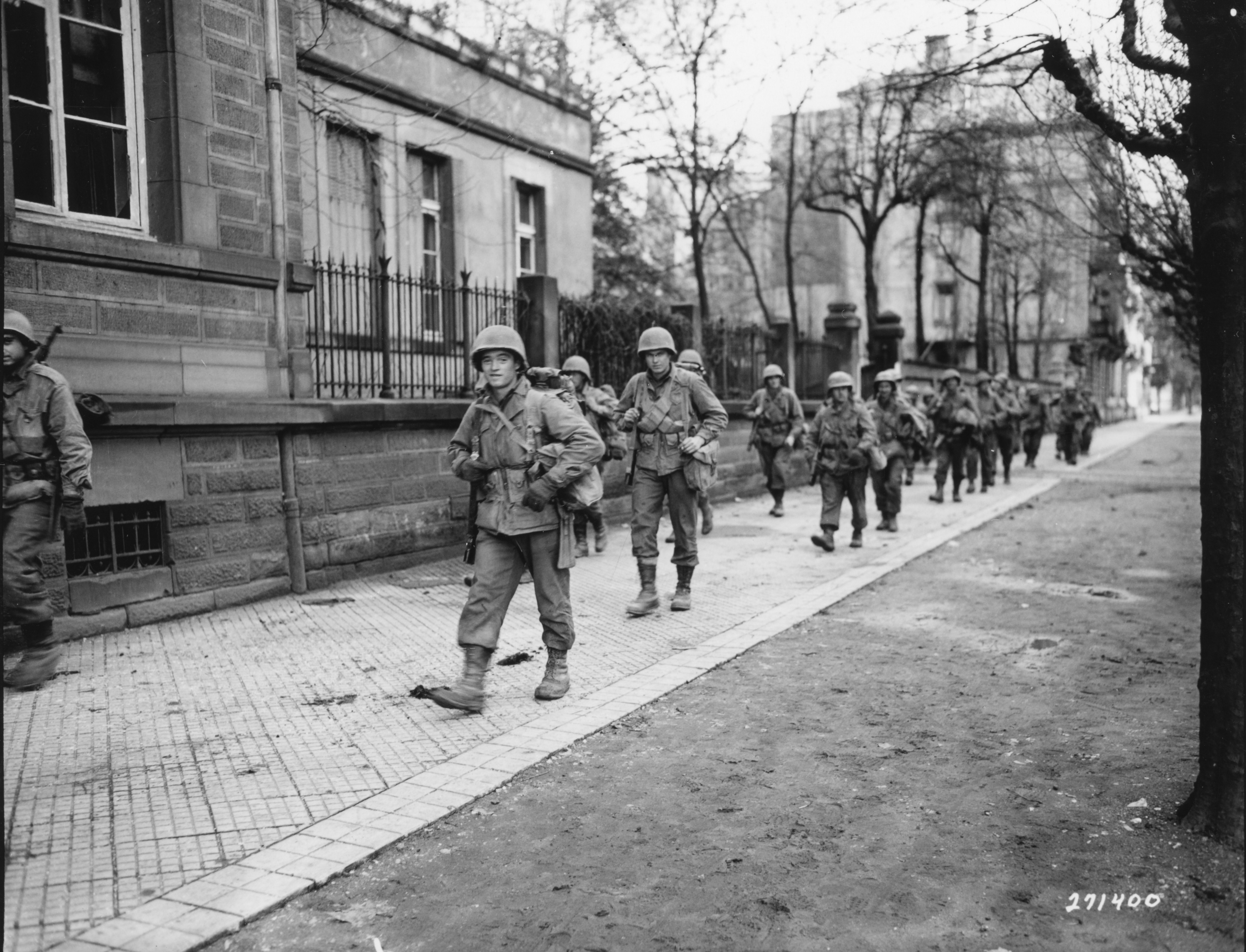
G.I.'s of Company E, 324th Regiment, 44th Division march through the Strasbourg area of France, November 1944.

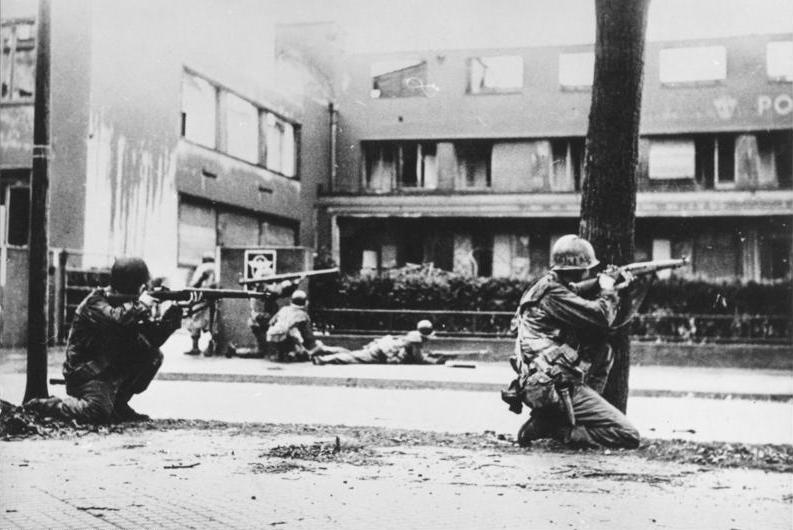
Soldiers of the 44th Infantry Division in Mannheim, March 1945

The 44th Infantry Division landed in France via Cherbourg Naval Base, 15 September 1944, and trained for a month before entering combat, 18 October 1944, when it relieved the 79th Division in the vicinity of Foret de Parroy, east of Lunéville, France, to take part in the Seventh Army drive to secure several passes in the Vosges Mountains. Within 6 days, the division was hit by a heavy German counterattack, 25–26 October. The attack was repulsed and the 44th continued its active defense. On 13 November 1944, it jumped off in an attack northeast, forcing a passage through the Vosges Mountains east of Leintrey to Dossenheim, took Avricourt, 17 November, and pushed on to liberate Strasbourg, along with the 2d French Armored Division. After regrouping, the division returned to the attack, taking Ratzwiller and entering the Ensemble de Bitche in the Maginot Line. On 14 December, regiments of the 44th Division took part in assaulting major Maginot line fortifications. The division's 71st and 324th Infantry Regiments assaulted Fort Simserhof and nearby Hottviller. After six days of fighting, the unit captured Simershof on 20 December. Displacing to defensive positions east of Sarreguemines, 21–23 December, the 44th threw back three attempted crossings by the enemy of the Blies River.

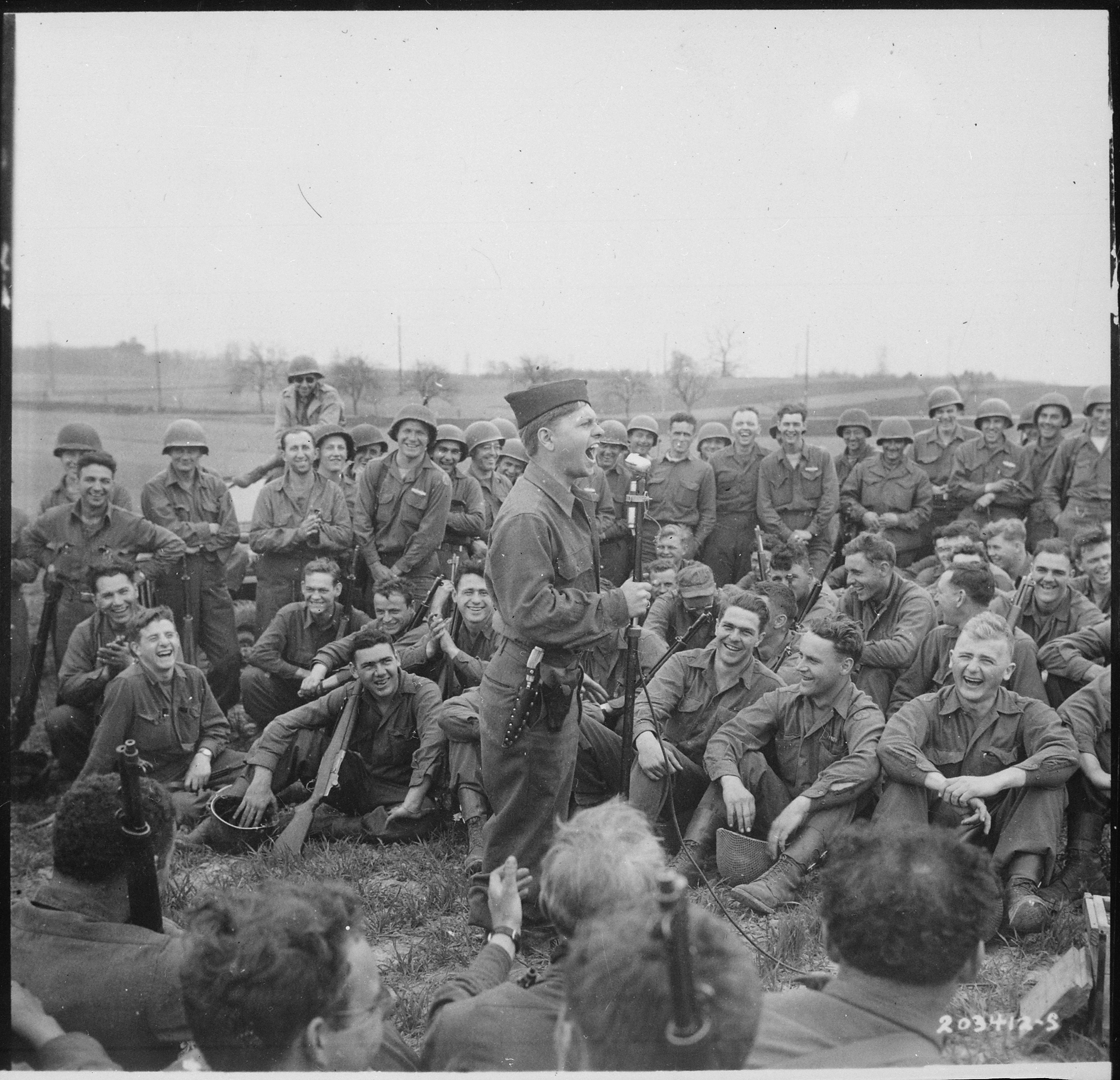
Mickey Rooney entertains soldiers of the 44th Division in Kist, Germany during a May 1945 jeep tour.

An aggressive defense of the Sarreguemines area was continued throughout February 1945 and most of March. Moving across the Rhine at Worms, 26 March, in the wake of the 3d Division, the 44th relieved the 3d, 26–27 March, and crossed the Neckar River to attack and capture Mannheim, 28–29 March. Shifting to the west bank of the Main, the division crossed that river at Gross-Auheim in early April, and engaged in a 3-week training period. Attacking 18 April, after the 10th Armored Division, the 44th took Ehingen, 23 April, crossed the Danube, and attacking southeast, took Füssen, Berg, and Wertach, in a drive on Imst, Austria. On 2 May, a group of V-2 rocket scientists that included Wernher von Braun surrendered to the 44th. Pursuing the disintegrating enemy through Fern Pass and into the Inn River valley, the 44th set up its CP at Imst on 4 May. After a short period of occupation duty, the division returned to the United States in July 1945 for retraining prior to redeployment, but the end of the Pacific war resulted in inactivation in November 1945 at Camp Chaffee, Arkansas.

==== Casualties ====
- Total battle casualties: 5,655
- Killed in action: 1,038
- Wounded in action: 4,209
- Missing in action: 100
- Prisoner of war: 308

==== Assignments in ETO ====
- 30 August 1944: Ninth Army, 12th Army Group.
- 5 September 1944: III Corps.
- 10 October 1944: Ninth Army, 12th Army Group.
- 14 October 1944: XV Corps, 6th Army Group, for supply.
- 17 October 1944: XV Corps, Seventh Army, 6th Army Group.
- 8 April 1945: Seventh Army, 6th Army Group.
- 15 April 1945: XXI Corps.
- 17 April 1945: VI Corps.

==== Statistics ====
World War II:

- Northern France (25 July – 14 September 44)(General Order (GO) #102, War Department (WD), 9 Nov 45)
- Rhineland (15 September 1944 – 21 March 1945 (GO #118, WD, 12 December 1945)
- Ardennes-Alsace (16 December 1944 – 25 January 1945 (GO #63, Department of the Army, 20 September 1948)
- Central Europe (22 March 1945 – 11 May 1945 (GO #116, WD, 11 December, 45)
- Days of combat: 190
- Distinguished Unit Citations: 3
- Medal of Honor – 1.
- DSC – 38.
- Distinguished Service Medal (United States) – 2.
- Silver Star – 464.
- Legion of Merit – 8.
- Soldiers Medal – 6.
- Bronze Star – 2,647.
- Air Medal – 110.
- Legion of Honour – 1.

==== Commanders ====
- Maj. Gen. Clifford R. Powell (September 1940 – August 1941).
- Maj. Gen. James I. Muir (August 1941 – August 1944).
- Maj. Gen. Robert L. Spragins (August 1944 – December 1944).
- Maj. Gen. William F. Dean (January 1945 – September 1945).
- Brig. Gen. William A. Beiderlinden (1 – 14 November 1945).
- Brig. Gen. Robert L. Dulaney (November 1945 – inactivation).
- Returned to U.S.: 21 July 1945.
- Inactivated: 30 November 1945.

=== Cold War ===
The 44th Infantry Division was reactivated in the Illinois Army National Guard in 1946, and inducted into federal service in late 1951 as a training unit during the Korean War. The unit was disbanded in October 1954 and the lineage was taken up by the 50th Armored Division. The lineage would return to the 50th Infantry Brigade Combat Team in 2008.

On 15 June 2017 the 50th IBCT was reflagged as the 44th Brigade Combat Team, and carries the lineage of the 44th Infantry Division.

== See also ==
- U.S. Army Regimental System
- Book edited by Archaeopteryx in March 2025 about the Liberation of the town of Bliesbruck, Woelfling and Wiesviller. The group welcome also families veterans and make tour of the battleflieds
