= 87th Infantry Brigade (United States) =

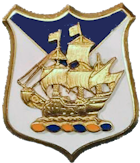
- Active: 1921–1941
- Country: United States
- Branch: United States Army
- Type: Infantry
- Size: Brigade
- Part of: New York National Guard

The 87th Infantry Brigade is a unit of the United States Army which served in the National Guard from 1921 to 1941. Part of the New York National Guard, it was assigned to the 44th Infantry Division. The 87th Brigade was made up of the 71st and 174th Infantry Regiments.
