= Wallace A. Downs =

Wallace Abel Downs
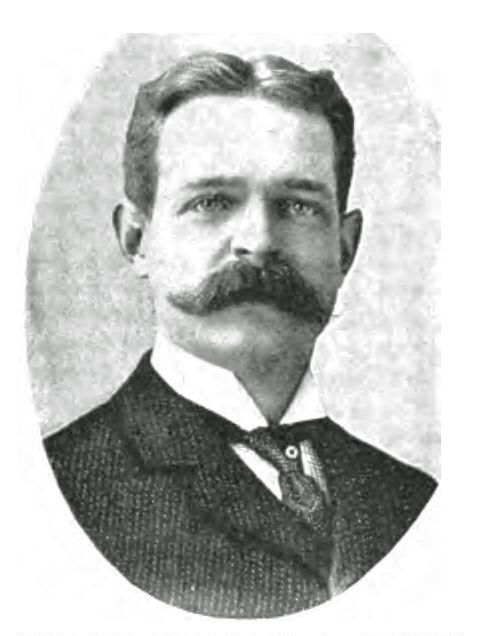
- Born: November 12, 1855; Seneca, New York, U.S.
- Died: February 12, 1908 (aged 52); Roosevelt Hospital, New York City, U.S.
- Burial place: Mount Hope Cemetery, Hastings-on-Hudson, New York, U.S.
- Education: Mt. Pleasant Military Academy
- Spouse: Lillie Weatherby Downs
- Military career
- Allegiance: United States
- Branch: United States Army
- Service years: 1871–1880; 1886–1898
- Rank: Colonel
- Commands: 71st New York Infantry Regiment
- Conflicts: Spanish–American War: Santiago campaign; Battle of San Juan Hill; Siege of Santiago

Wallace Abel Downs (November 12, 1855 – February 12, 1908) was an American colonel who participated in the Spanish–American War. He commanded the 71st New York Infantry Regiment throughout the war as its colonel. He was also a Freemason, notably serving as the Master of Crescent Lodge No. 402 from 1883 to 1885.

== Military career ==
Wallace was born on November 12, 1855, at Seneca, New York as the son of Major Abel Downs and Ann Downs. Downs enrolled in the Mt. Pleasant Military Academy and after graduation, he moved to New York City to become a contractor and where he would found the Hutchinson Manufacturing Company and became its secretary and treasurer. Downs later helped found the Continental Match Company as its secretary and treasurer while William M. Mixer became president of the company. In December 1874, Downs became a part of the 16th Battalion and on 1876, he was promoted to Major of the battalion, occasionally serving as its adjutant until resigning from the Battalion in 1880 due to his lack of personal interest in military affairs. Despite this, Downs re-enlisted to the 71st New York Infantry Regiment as an Adjutant in September 1886. (Note: The text states 1876, but this was likely an error.) In April 1887, he was promoted to Major and was promoted to Lieutenant Colonel by 1893. Around this time, Downs was described as being a strict disciplinarian, but enjoyed the confidence of his men.

== Freemasonry ==
Downs also engaged in Freemasonry as he was passed and raised at Crescent Lodge No. 402, eventually becoming its master in 1883 and holding that office for 2 years. Downs was then exalted at Crescent Lodge No. 220 before finally settling at Amity Chapter No. 160. He received his council degrees at Adelphie Council No. 7 and was knighted at the Palestine Commandery on 1888. Downs was also known for have raised fifty Masons at the East, making it one of the most successful lodges at New York City. He was also a Republican, but didn't tend to be strict about his political beliefs and tended to vote based on who he personally thought would be the better candidate.

== Spanish–American War ==
On May 2, 1898, due to the outbreak of the Spanish–American War, Downs took up arms as the Lieutenant Colonel of the 71st New York again. He was initially stationed at Camp Black, Hempstead before being transferred to Ybor City and shipped out to Cuba where the regiment would see active combat against the Spanish Army. On May 31, 1898, Downs was promoted to Colonel and given command of the regiment and would subsequently see active combat at the Battle of San Juan Hill and the Siege of Santiago. Downs was mustered out on November 15, 1898, but by this point, Downs was in declining health and would die at the Roosevelt Hospital on February 12, 1908, from Appendicitis.
