= Pouso Redondo =

- Municipality
- Flag Coat of arms

- Location in Santa Catarina, Brazil

- Location in Brazil
- Coordinates: 27°15′28″S 49°56′02″W
- Country: Brazil
- Region: South
- State: Santa Catarina
- Mesoregion: Vale do Itajai

Government
  - Mayor: Oscar Gutz

Area
  - Total: 138.698 sq mi (359.225 km^{2})

Population (2020)
  - Total: 17,712
  - Density: 127.70/sq mi (49.306/km^{2})
- Time zone: UTC -3
- Website: www.pousoredondo.sc.gov.br

Pouso Redondo is a municipality in the state of Santa Catarina in the South region of Brazil.

== Notable people ==
- Alceu Feldmann - racing driver.
- Adir Kist - Brazilian football player

== See also ==
- List of municipalities in Santa Catarina
