= Czesław Bieżanko =

Polish entomologist

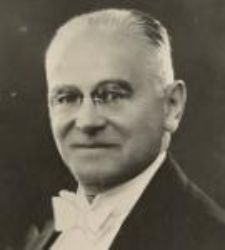

Czesław Marian Bieżanko (22 November 1895 in Kielce – 1986 in Pelotas, Brazil) was a Polish entomologist and recognized authority on South American butterflies.

He was professor of the College of Agronomy in the city of Pelotas (currently Universidade Federal de Pelotas) and Doctor Honoris Causa of the Agricultural Academy. Bieżanko worked on the generic classification of Lepidoptera. At least one moth genus was named after him (Biezankoia Strand, 1936) and eleven insect species bear his name. He was one of the introducers of soybean cultivation in Rio Grande do Sul.

In 1964 he published a list of his publications (Biezanko C. M., 1964: Lista das publicacoes de C. M. Biezanko. Entomologia (Available publications), 8 pp., which does not include his last Genero e espécies dedicados a C. M. Biezanko. 1 pp. and Kilka slów o Francesco Stancaro. 4 pp.(all 1965).
