= Kist (surname) =

Kist is a surname. Notable people with the surname include:

- Adir Kist (born 1972), Brazilian football coach and former goalkeeper
- César Kist (born 1964), Brazilian tennis player
- Christian Kist (born 1986), Dutch darts player
- Ewald Kist (born 1944), Dutch field hockey player
- Kees Kist (born 1952), Dutch footballer
- Richard Kist, member of parliament in England
