= Brazil-United States Political-Military Agreement =

1942 bilateral treaty

The Brazil-United States Political-Military Agreement (Portuguese: Acordos de Washington, Washington Accords) which came into an effect on 23 May 1942, was a prelude to formal entering of Brazil into World War II. Its implementation was carried out by the Joint Brazil-United States Military Commission (JBUSMC). It was a result on a series of consultations in Rio de Janeiro since 1941, during which a number of various political and business decisions were made. The term "Washington Accords" may refer to these preceding negotiations as well.

The consequences of the Agreement included the second rubber boom and the "rubber soldiers" in Brazil.

== Background ==
Strategic position of Brazil in south atlantic, its long coastline and its supplies of strategic commodities was important for allied forces. Before US entered the war, they concluded an agreement called Anglo-Soviet Treaty of 1942. This agreement has been described as a "broader wartime cooperation program".
