= Charles Andrew MacGillivary =

US Army soldier and Medal of Honor recipient (1917–2000)

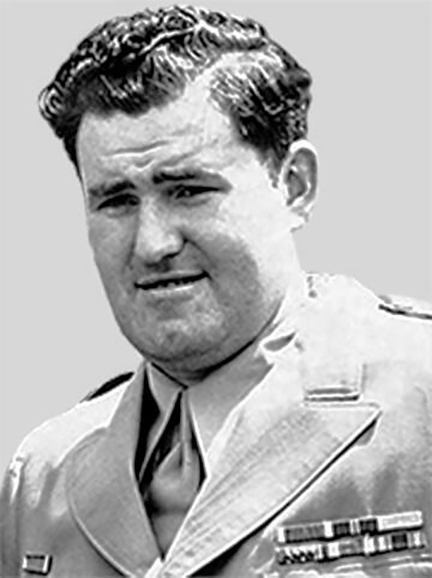
- Sergeant Charles A. MacGillivary
- Born: January 7, 1917; Charlottetown, Prince Edward Island, Canada
- Died: June 24, 2000 (aged 83); Boston, Massachusetts, US
- Burial place: Arlington National Cemetery
- Military career
- Allegiance: United States of America
- Branch: United States Army
- Service years: 1942–1945
- Rank: Sergeant
- Units: 71st Infantry, 44th Infantry Division
- Conflicts: World War II
- Awards: Medal of Honor; Distinguished Service Cross; Bronze Star; Purple Heart; Croix de Guerre

Charles Andrew MacGillivary (January 17, 1917 – June 24, 2000) was a Medal of Honor recipient, born in Charlottetown, Prince Edward Island, Canada. A sergeant in the United States Army, he was attached to Company I, 71st Infantry, 44th Infantry Division during World War II.

== Pre-war ==
Born to Cardigan Scot Roland MacGillivary and Minnie Quinn, he attended Queens Square School in Charlottetown, Prince Edward Island, Canada and joined the Merchant Marine at age 16. Shortly thereafter, MacGillivary emigrated to the United States to live with his older brother in Boston, Massachusetts. When living with his brother, he learned about the Army and considered joining it.

After the attack on Pearl Harbor, he volunteered for the U.S. Army. In January 1942, he joined as a private and was assigned to the European Theatre of Operations. He told the United States Senate Judiciary Subcommittee on Immigration, Refugees and Border Security 50 years later, that when he was in boot camp:

an officer asked me and two other immigrants ... whether we wanted to become U.S. citizens. [They took us] to a federal courthouse and [swore us] in before a judge. I thought that if I was going to fight for this country, I should be a U.S. citizen.

== World War II service ==
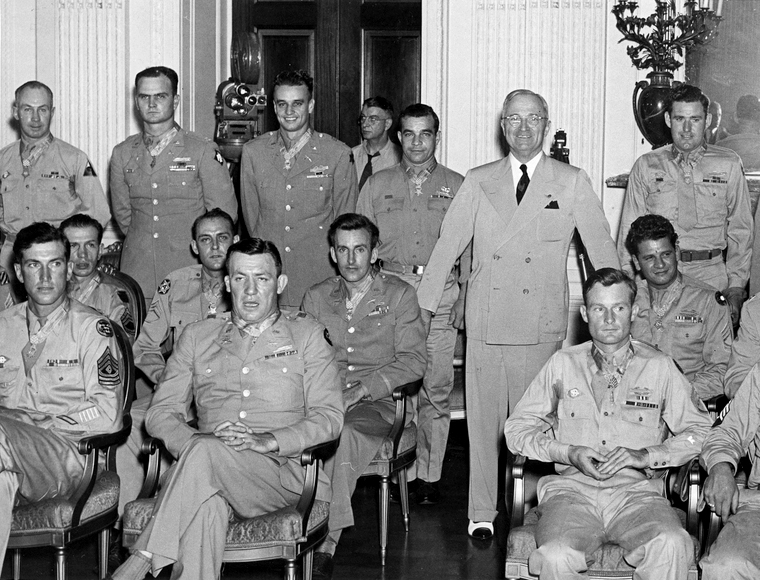
President Harry S. Truman with some of the 28 recipients of the Medal of Honor who were decorated at a ceremony in the East Room of the White House on August 23, 1945. MacGillivary is in the back row, at right.

MacGillivary was assigned to Company I, 71st Infantry Regiment, 44th Infantry Division. The division landed in France via Cherbourg on 15 September 1944. It trained for a month before entering combat on 18 October. The unit fought in numerous battles throughout France before reaching Wœlfling on the French-German border during the Battle of the Bulge.

Sergeant MacGillivary was serving as company commander on January 1, 1945, because of casualties among the officers. Ammunition was low and the company was pinned down by the 17th SS Panzergrenadier Division, a Waffen-SS panzer unit in Wœlfling, France.

MacGillivary, then 27, attacked German machine gun placements with grenades and a submachine gun. When he ran out of ammunition, he picked up a German machine gun, shooting the enemy at close range. He knocked out four German machine gun positions and killed 36 German soldiers. During the action, a German machine gun tore off his left arm. MacGillivary told a Boston Globe reporter in 1995:

I looked down and my left arm wasn't there. When you get hit by machine gun, it's like somebody put a hot poker in you. I struck the stump of my arm into the snow, but the warm blood melted the snow. I figured I was dying. When they rescued me, my arm had a cake of bloody ice frozen around it, sealing the wound. If it had been summer, I'd be dead.

The German unit he fought had taken the title Götz von Berlichingen after a 15th-century German knight who lost his right hand in battle.

== Medal of Honor citation ==
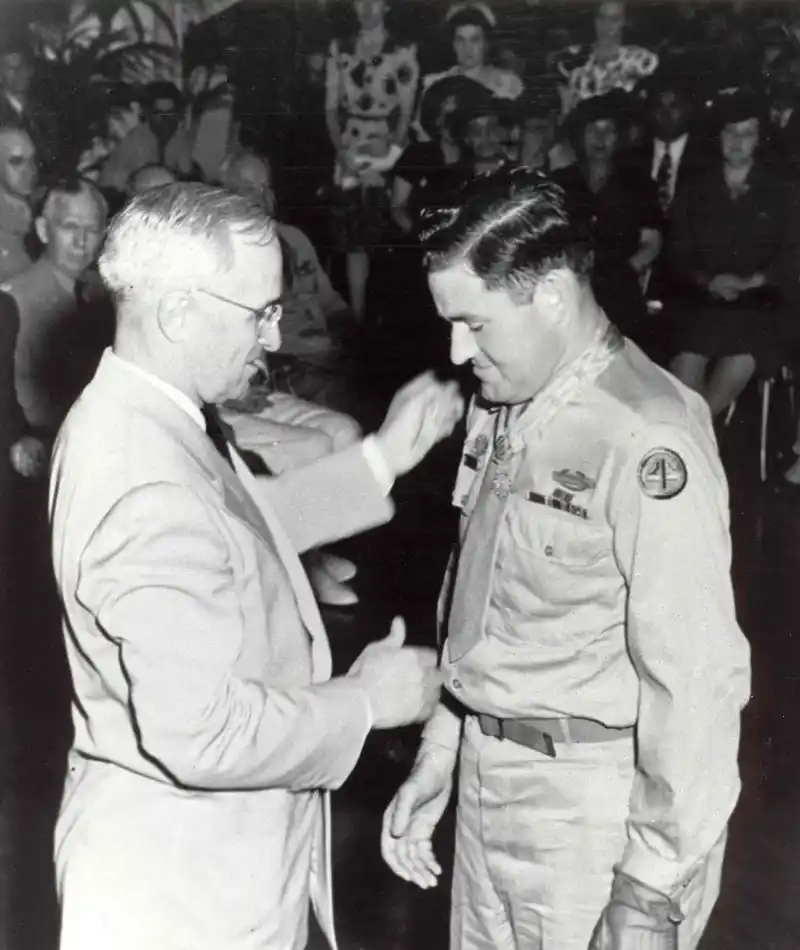
Truman shakes MacGillivary's hand after awarding him the Medal of Honor

MacGillivary was one of 28 World War II service members who received the Medal of Honor in a White House ceremony on August 23, 1945. The War Department stated that so many were decorated in a single ceremony because many had been severely wounded. After two soldiers in wheelchairs, all other award recipients were seated alphabetically by last name during the ceremony.

MacGillivary's citation reads as follows:

He led a squad when his unit moved forward in darkness to meet the threat of a breakthrough by elements of the 17th German Panzer Grenadier Division. Assigned to protect the left flank, he discovered hostile troops digging in. As he reported this information, several German machine guns opened fire, stopping the American advance. Knowing the position of the enemy, Sgt. MacGillivary volunteered to knock out one of the guns while another company closed in from the right to assault the remaining strongpoints. He circled from the left through woods and snow, carefully worked his way to the emplacement, and shot the two camouflaged gunners at a range of three feet as other enemy forces withdrew. Early in the afternoon of the same day, Sgt. MacGillivary was dispatched on reconnaissance and found that Company I was being opposed by about six machine guns reinforcing a company of fanatically fighting Germans. His unit began to attack but was pinned down by furious automatic and small-arms fire. With a clear idea of where the enemy guns were placed, he voluntarily embarked on a lone combat patrol. Skillfully taking advantage of all available cover, he stalked the enemy, reached a hostile machine gun, and blasted its crew with a grenade. He picked up a submachine gun from the battlefield and pressed on to within 10 yards of another machine gun, where the enemy crew discovered him and feverishly tried to swing their weapon into line to cut him down. He charged ahead, jumped into the midst of the Germans, and killed them with several bursts. Without hesitation, he moved on to still another machine gun, creeping, crawling, and rushing from tree to tree, until close enough to toss a grenade into the emplacement and close with its defenders. He dispatched this crew also, but was himself seriously wounded. Through his indomitable fighting spirit, great initiative, and utter disregard for personal safety in the face of powerful enemy resistance, Sgt. MacGillivary destroyed four hostile machine guns and immeasurably helped his company to continue on its mission with minimum casualties.

== Awards and decorations ==

Badge	Combat Infantryman Badge		
1st row	Medal of Honor	Distinguished Service Cross	Soldier's Medal
2nd row	Bronze Star Medal	Purple Heart with 3 Oak leaf clusters (4 awards)	Army Good Conduct Medal
3rd row	American Campaign Medal	European–African–Middle Eastern Campaign Medal with 4 Campaign stars	World War II Victory Medal
Unit awards	Presidential Unit Citation		

Foreign Awards

Croix de Guerre

(France)

== Post-war ==
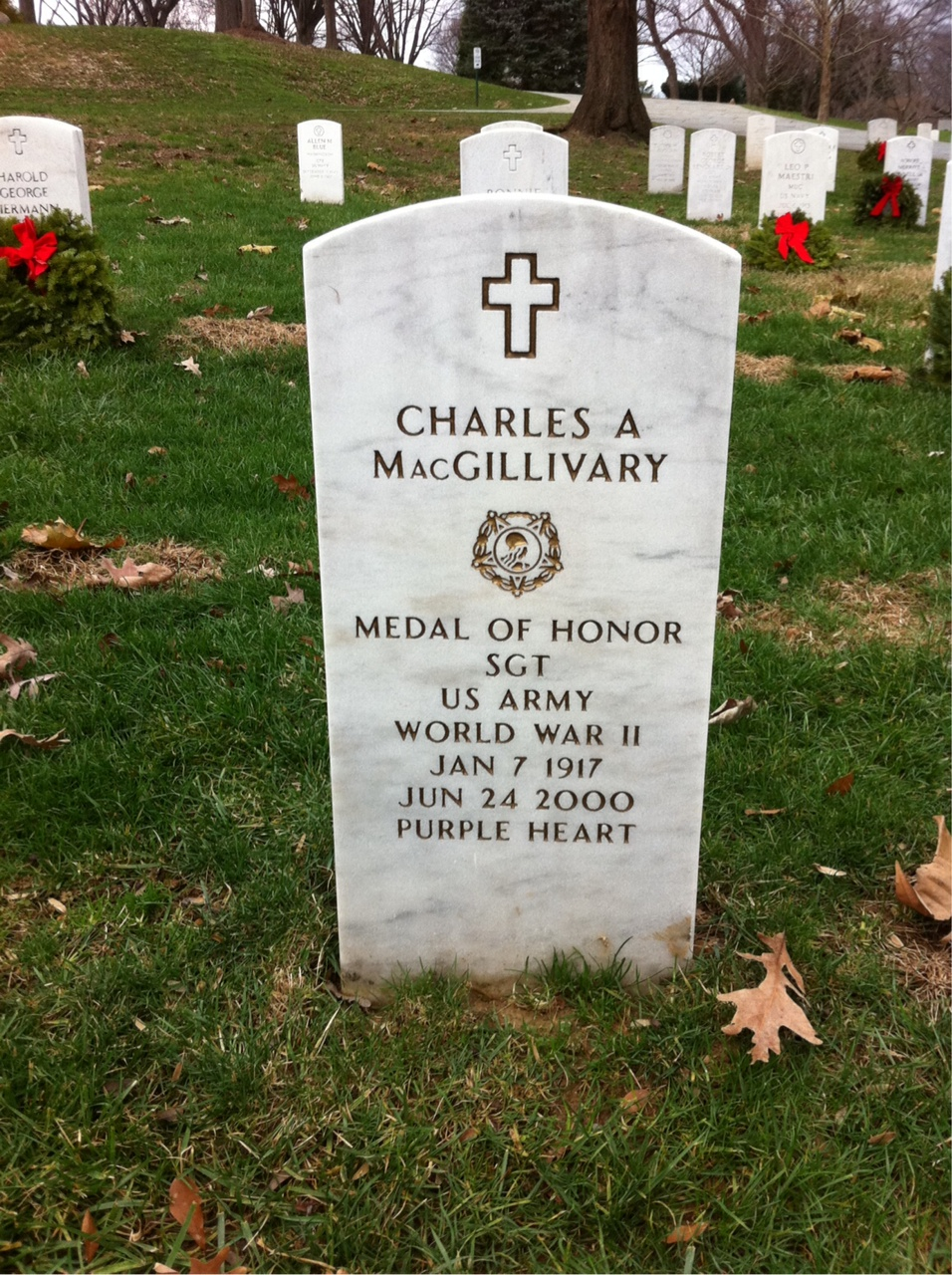
Grave at Arlington National Cemetery

After the war, MacGillivary returned home to Boston, where for a short time he worked as a special agent for Boston's treasury department. He joined the United States Customs Service in 1950, starting as a warehouse officer, but soon became an agent for the United States Customs Office of Investigations, conducting special investigations. His daughter Charlene Corea remembered him as being particularly busy in the winter inspecting Christmas trees that entered the United States from Canada. He retired from the Customs Service in 1975.

Sergeant Charles A. MacGillivary was enrolled as a member of the Ancient and Honorable Artillery Company of Massachusetts, the third oldest chartered military organization in the world on April 6, 1992. He was the seventh member of the company to receive the Medal of Honor.

MacGillivary served as president of the Congressional Medal of Honor Society from 1973 to 1975. While president, he led a project to locate other immigrant recipients of the Medal of Honor.

He and his wife, Esther, had three daughters. She died in 1999.

MacGillivary was a resident of Braintree, Massachusetts, from 1957 until his death at age 83 on June 24, 2000, in the Veterans Administration hospital in Brockton, Massachusetts. Rev. Philip Salois, who had himself received a Silver Star in the Vietnam War, officiated at the funeral. Governor of Massachusetts Paul Cellucci was in attendance at MacGillivary's funeral.

MacGillivary and his wife Esther (1921–1999) are buried at Arlington National Cemetery, in Arlington, Virginia.

== See also ==
- List of Medal of Honor recipients for World War II
