= Federal University of Pelotas =

University in Brazil

Coordinates: 31.7814°S 52.3235°W

- Universidade Federal de Pelotas
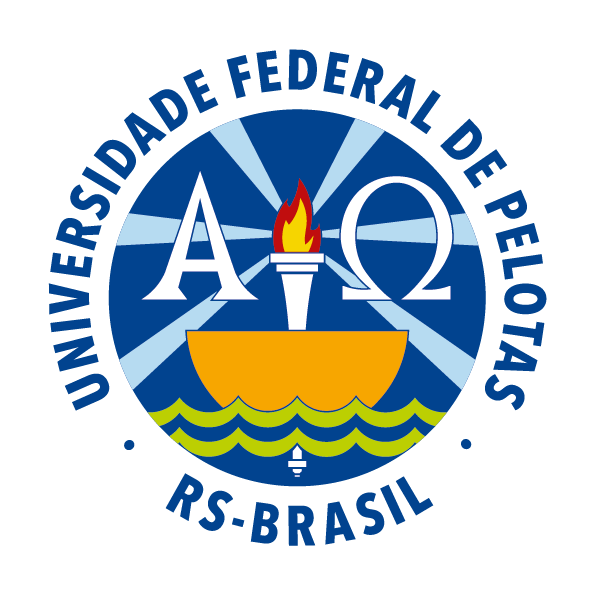
- Other names: UFPel
- Type: Public
- Established: 1969-08-08
- Rector: Isabela Fernandes Andrade
- Students: 9,679
- Undergraduates: 7,652
- Postgraduates: 1,266
- Location: Pelotas, Rio Grande do Sul, Brazil
- Campus: Pelotas Capão do Leão
- Website: ufpel.edu.br

The Federal University of Pelotas (Portuguese: Universidade Federal de Pelotas, UFPel) is a Brazilian public higher education institution, maintained by the Federal Government with administrative headquarters in the city of Pelotas, in the state of Rio Grande do Sul. It also has a campus in the city of Capão do Leão.

It currently offers 94 undergraduate courses, 45 masters courses and 23 doctorate courses distributed in 24 academic units (7 Academic Centers, 4 Basic Institutes, 11 Colleges, 1 Higher School of Physical Education and 1 Conservatory of Music). Currently, it has master's and / or doctorate courses. in all areas of knowledge: Exact and Earth Sciences, Biological Sciences, Engineering, Agrarian Sciences, Health Sciences, Social Sciences, Human Sciences, Law, Letters and Arts, also counting on courses with Multidisciplinary performance.

In 2017, UFPel was included in the QS World University Rankings. In 2020, it ranks 79rd among universities in Latin America and among the 170 best universities in the BRICS economic block.

== Academic departments ==
- Center for Arts (CA)
- Center for Chemical, Pharmaceutical and Food Sciences (CCQFA)
- Center for Technological Development (CDTEC)
- Center for Open and Distance Education (CEAD)
- Center for Engineering (CENG)
- Center for Mercosul Integration (CIM)
- Center for Languages and Communication (CLC)
- Conservatory of Music (CM)
- Higher School of Physical Education (ESEF)
- Faculty of Business Administration and Tourism (FAT)
- Eliseu Maciel Faculty of Agronomy (FAEM)
- Faculty of Architecture and Urbanism (FAURB)
- Faculty of Law (FD)
- Faculty of Education (FAE)
- Faculty of Nursing and Midwifery (FEO)
- Faculty of Medicine (FM)
- Faculty of Meteorology (FMET)
- Faculty of Nutrition (FN)
- Faculty of Dentistry (FO)
- Faculty of Veterinary Medicine (FVET)
- Institute of Biology (IB)
- Institute of Human Sciences (ICH)
- Institute of Physics and Mathematics (IFM)
- Institute of Philosophy, Sociology and Politics (IFISP)

== Distinguished faculty members ==
- Czesław Bieżanko (College of Agronomy "Eliseu Maciel")
- Lotar Siewerdt (College of Agronomy "Eliseu Maciel")
- Odir Dellagostin (Technology Development Center)
- Gilda Maciel Correa Russomano (College of Law "Bruno de Mendonça Lima")
- Carlos Alberto Gomes Chiarelli (College of Law "Bruno de Mendonça Lima")

== See also ==
- Brazil University Rankings
- List of federal universities of Brazil
- Universities and Higher Education in Brazil
