= Kist, Bavaria =

Kist
- Municipality
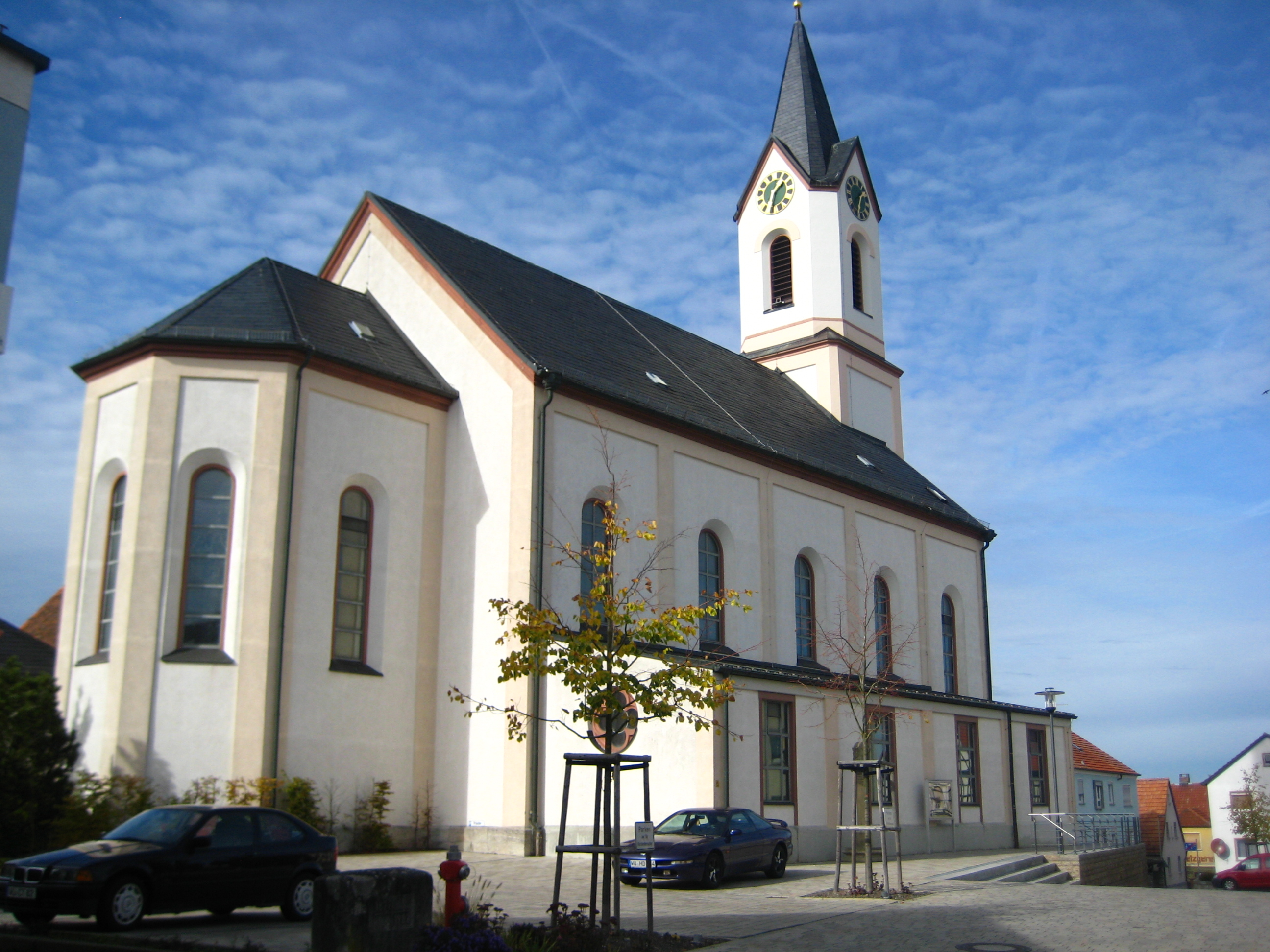
- Church of Saint Batholomew

- Coat of arms

- Location of Kist within Würzburg district
- Interactive map of Kist
- Location within Germany Location within Bavaria
- Coordinates: 49°44′N 9°50′E
- Country: Germany
- State: Bavaria
- Admin. region: Unterfranken
- District: Würzburg
- Municipal assoc.: Kist
- Subdivisions: 2 Ortsteile

Government
  - Mayor (2020–26): Volker Faulhaber (SPD)

Area
  - Total: 3.86 km^{2} (1.49 sq mi)
- Elevation: 373 m (1,224 ft)

Population (2025-12-31)
  - Total: 2,662
  - Density: 690/km^{2} (1,790/sq mi)
- Time zone: UTC+01:00 (CET)
  - Summer (DST): UTC+02:00 (CEST)
- Postal codes: 97270
- Dialling codes: 09306
- Vehicle registration: WÜ
- Website: Gemeinde Kist

Kist (German pronunciation: [kɪst]) is a municipality in the district of Würzburg in Bavaria in Germany.
