= 174th Infantry Regiment (United States) =

American military unit

174th Infantry Regiment (74th New York)
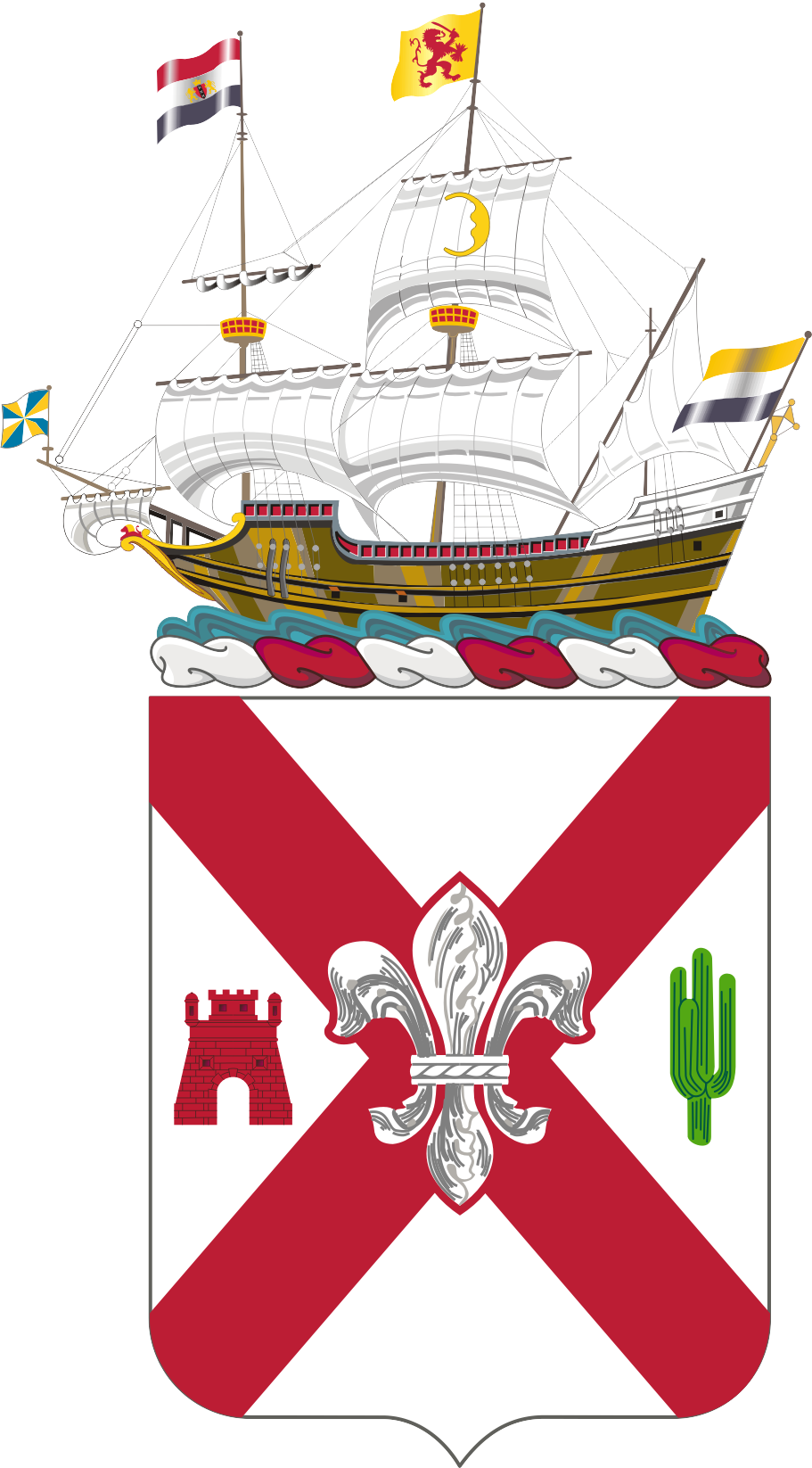
- Coat of Arms
- Active: 1861–1864, 1898–1945, 1947–1955
- Country: United States of America
- Allegiance: New York
- Branch: Army National Guard
- Type: Infantry regiment
- Motto: Semper Fidelis (Always Faithful)
- Colors: White, red, silver.
- Engagements: Pancho Villa Expedition

The 174th Infantry Regiment was an infantry regiment of the United States Army, New York Army National Guard. It traced its heritage back to the 74th New York State Militia formed in Buffalo in 1854. In 1955, the regiment was broken up into units of various arms and services.

== History ==
=== Civil War ===
During the Civil War, members of the 74th helped form the 21st New York Volunteer Infantry (the First Buffalo Regiment). The 74th was mustered into active service twice in 1863 for a period of thirty days each time. Another unit called the “74th New York Volunteer Infantry” that also existed during the war was a different unit with no connection to the 74th Regiment of Buffalo.

=== Spanish-American War, Mexican Expedition, and World War I ===
On 19 July 1898, elements of the 74th New York mustered in for service in the Spanish–American War, but their units were soon absorbed into the 202nd New York Volunteer Infantry Regiments. On 15 April 1899, the 74th New York Infantry was reorganized in Savannah, Georgia. The regiment was again mustered for service on 2 July 1916 for service along the Mexican border, to guard against raids from Pancho Villa's banditos. On 24 February 1917, they were mustered out. This wouldn't last long, however, and the regiment was ordered back into federal service on 38 March 1917 for service in World War I. On 1 October, the regiment was broken up, with 33 officers and 1,350 men transferred to the 108th Infantry Regiment, 158 men transferred to the 106th Field Artillery Regiment, and 87 men transferred to the 102nd Engineer Regiment, that were all parts of the New York National Guard's 27th Division. The remainder of the officers and men were transferred to the 55th Pioneer Infantry, which was organized on 4 January 1918 at Camp Wadsworth, South Carolina, and they arrived in France in September 1918. They returned to the United States, and were deactivated on 8 February 1919 at Camp A.P. Hill, Virginia. They regained the title of 74th New York Infantry on 22 April 1919.

=== Interwar period ===
The 174th was reconstituted and partially organized 6 April–27 July 1921 as the 74th Infantry, New York Guard. The active elements were redesignated on 18 October 1921 as the 174th Infantry and assigned to the 44th Division. The regimental headquarters was organized on 15 May 1922 and federally recognized at Buffalo, New York. The regiment conducted annual summer training most years at Camp Smith, near Peekskill, New York, and some years at Fort Niagara, New York. The regiment was inducted into active federal service at Buffalo on 16 September 1940 and moved to Fort Dix, New Jersey, where it arrived 24 September 1940.

=== World War II ===
The regiment was transferred to Camp Claiborne, Louisiana, on 16 January 1942, and then to Fort Lewis, Washington, on 4 May 1942. On 5 January 1943, the regiment relocated to Ojai, California, and then to San Fernando on 27 January 1943 where on the same date they were relieved of assignment to the 44th Infantry Division. Now assigned to the Western Defense Command, the 174th was subordinated to the III Corps on 22 January 1944 and moved to Camp White, Oregon, on 4 February 1944. On 28 March 1944, the regiment was transferred to Camp Chaffee, Arkansas, under the XVI Corps. From April 1944, the regiment provided an accelerated six-week course of infantry training (four weeks of familiarization, qualification, and transition firing, and two weeks of tactical training) to men who were formerly members of disbanded anti-aircraft and tank destroyer units or who had volunteered for transfer to the infantry from other branches of the Army. The 174th was assigned to the XXXVI Corps on 17 July 1944, whereupon it was transferred to the Fourth Army in September 1944. The regiment relocated to Camp Gruber, Oklahoma, on 9 December 1944, and then to Camp Rucker, Alabama, on 3 April 1945 under the Replacement and School Command. The 174th Infantry Regiment was inactivated at Camp Rucker on 27 September 1945.

=== Cold War ===
The 174th was reorganized on 15 April 1947 at Buffalo and was assigned to the 27th Infantry Division. It was eventually broken up and converted into other units on 1 February 1955.

During the 1980's (Possibly earlier) A Co 1/174th was located at the Masten Ave Armory in Buffalo NY, and Bravo Co 1/174th was located at the Tonawanda Armory located at 79 Delaware Street in Tonawanda, NY. Both Units were part of the 42nd Inf Div.

In the early part of 1981, Bravo Company 1/174th was relocated to the Seneca St. Armory, Hornell, N.Y.
