= Adir Kist =

Brazilian footballer

Personal information
- Full name: Adir Blazio Kist
- Date of birth: 21 March 1972 (age 54)
- Place of birth: Ipumirim, Brazil
- Height: 1.85 m (6 ft 1 in)
- Position: Goalkeeper

Senior career*
Years	Team	Apps	(Gls)
1991–1993	Juventude		
1994	Ariquemes	5	(0)
1994	Lajeadense		
1995–1996	Guarany de Garibaldi		
1997–1998	Brasil de Farroupilha	37	(0)
1998	São José-RS		
1999	Porto-PE		
1999	Náutico		
1999–2001	Santa Clara	30	(0)
2001–2002	Felgueiras	24	(0)
2002–2003	Penafiel	10	(0)
2003–2004	Maia	0	(0)
2004	Londrina	8	(0)
2004–2006	Cianorte		
2006	Farroupilha		
2007	Rio Branco-SP		
2007	Garibaldi		
2008	Cianorte		

Managerial career
- 2023: Santos (assistant)
- * Club domestic league appearances and goals

Adir Blazio Kist (born 21 March 1972), is a Brazilian football coach and former player who played as a goalkeeper.

== Playing career ==
Born in Ipumirim, Santa Catarina, Kist began his career with Juventude. After representing Ariquemes, Lajeadense, Guarany de Garibaldi, Brasil de Farroupilha, São José-RS, Porto-PE and Náutico, he moved abroad in 1999, and joined Portuguese Segunda Liga side Santa Clara.

Kist continued to feature in the Portuguese second level in the following years, playing for Felgueiras, Penafiel and Maia. He returned to his home country in April 2004 with Londrina, but left the club in June, after the departure of head coach Caio Júnior.

Kist subsequently moved to Cianorte, and later represented Farroupilha, Rio Branco-SP and Garibaldi before returning to Cianorte for the 2008 season. He retired with the side shortly after, aged 36.

== Post-playing career ==
After retiring, Kist became an executive director of his last club Cianorte. On 24 June 2023, he left the side after 15 years, and became Paulo Turra's assistant at Santos.
