= 52nd Cavalry =

52nd Cavalry may refer to:

- 52nd Cavalry Brigade, United States
- 52nd Cavalry Division, Soviet Union

== See also ==
- 52nd Division (disambiguation)
- 52nd Brigade (disambiguation)
- 52nd Regiment (disambiguation)
- 52nd (disambiguation)
