= LII Corps =

LII Corps or 52nd Corps may refer to:

- 52nd Corps (German Empire)
- LII Army Corps, Wehrmacht, Germany
- 52nd Rifle Corps, Soviet Union

== See also ==
- List of military corps by number
- 52nd Army (disambiguation)
- 52nd Brigade (disambiguation)
- 52nd Division (disambiguation)
- 52nd Regiment (disambiguation)
- 52nd Squadron (disambiguation)
- 52nd (disambiguation)
