= 52nd Army =

52nd Army may refer to:

- Fifty-Second Army (Japan), Imperial Japanese Army
- 52nd Army (Soviet Union)

== See also ==
- List of armies by number
- 52nd Division (disambiguation)
- 52nd Brigade (disambiguation)
- 52nd Regiment (disambiguation)
- 52nd Squadron (disambiguation)
- 52nd (disambiguation)
