= 52nd Cavalry Brigade =

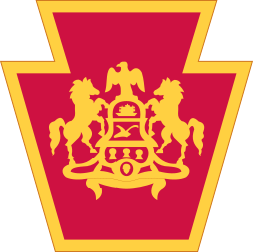
- Shoulder Sleeve Insignia of the Pennsylvania National Guard as used by the brigade
- Active: 21 July 1920 – 23 September 1940
- Country: United States
- Branch: United States Army
- Type: Cavalry
- Size: Brigade
- Part of: 21st Cavalry Division (1921–1938); 22nd Cavalry Division (1938–1940)
- Brigade HQ: Harrisburg, Pennsylvania (from 1933)

Commanders
- Notable commanders: Brig. Gen. Edward C. Shannon

The 52nd Cavalry Brigade was a cavalry brigade of the United States Army, belonging to the Pennsylvania National Guard. The brigade was formed in 1920. It was disbanded in 1940 when a reorganisation of the cavalry divisions of the United States Army saw many cavalry brigades reorganised and disbanded.

== History ==
The 52nd Cavalry Brigade was constituted in the Pennsylvania National Guard and assigned to the 21st Cavalry Division, and allotted to the Commonwealth of Pennsylvania. On 21 July 1920, the headquarters troop was organised as Troop E, 1st Cavalry at Philadelphia, Pennsylvania, but redesignated as Headquarters Troop, 52nd Cavalry Brigade on 1 June 1921. On 6 August 1921, the headquarters was organised and federally recognised in Wayne, Pennsylvania. The headquarters moved to Philadelphia, Pennsylvania in 1925, but moved to Columbia, Pennsylvania on 12 March 1926, and finally Harrisburg, Pennsylvania on 1 July 1933.

From 6 July to 19 July 1930, the brigade took part in the Third Corps Area CPX at Fort George G. Meade in Maryland. Alongside the Headquarters Third Corps Area, Headquarters III Corps (Provisional), Headquarters 28th, 29th, 79th, 80th, and 99th Divisions alongside the 62nd Cavalry Division, 16th, 55th, 56th, 58th, and 91st Infantry Brigade and 1st Field Artillery Brigade.

The brigade conducted annual summer training at Mount Gretna, Pennsylvania from 1921-35, and at Fort Indiantown Gap, Pennsylvania from 1936-39. The entire brigade was called up to perform relief duties in connection with the flooding of the Schuylkill River and Susquehanna River in the spring of 1936. The flood relief took place between 17 March and 9 April 1936 alongside the 28th Division; 52nd Cavalry Brigade; 213th Coast Artillery Regiment; and 103rd Observation Squadron.

In about October 1938, the brigade was relieved from assignment to the 21st Cavalry Division and assigned to the 22nd Cavalry Division. From 4 to 25 August 1940, the brigade alongside almost all other units within the First Army took part in the First Army Maneuvers in the Plattsburgh-Watertown-Canton-Ogden area of New York.

The headquarters was consolidated with Headquarters, 22nd Cavalry Division on 23 September 1940, and reorganised and redesignated as Headquarters, 73rd Field Artillery Brigade at Harrisburg, Pennsylvania. The new field artillery brigade also consisted of soldiers from the old 122nd Medical Squadron. The headquarters troop was concurrently reorganised and redesignated as Troop A, 104th Cavalry Regiment.

== Units ==
The organisation of the brigade included:

- Headquarters & Headquarters Troop
- 103rd Cavalry Regiment
- 104th Cavalry Regiment
- 52nd Machine Gun Squadron (1921-28)

== Commanders ==
Commanders of the brigade included:

- 6 August 1921 – 15 February 1926: Brigadier-General John P. Wood
- 16 February 1926 – 24 March 1933: Brigadier-General Edward C. Shannon (Lieutenant Governor of Pennsylvania from 20 January 1931)
- 3 June 1933 – 16 January 1940: Brigadier-General Edward J. Stackpole, Jr.
- 16 January 1940 – 1 October 1940: Colonel George J. Shoemaker
