= 110th Cavalry Regiment (United States, 1921–1940) =

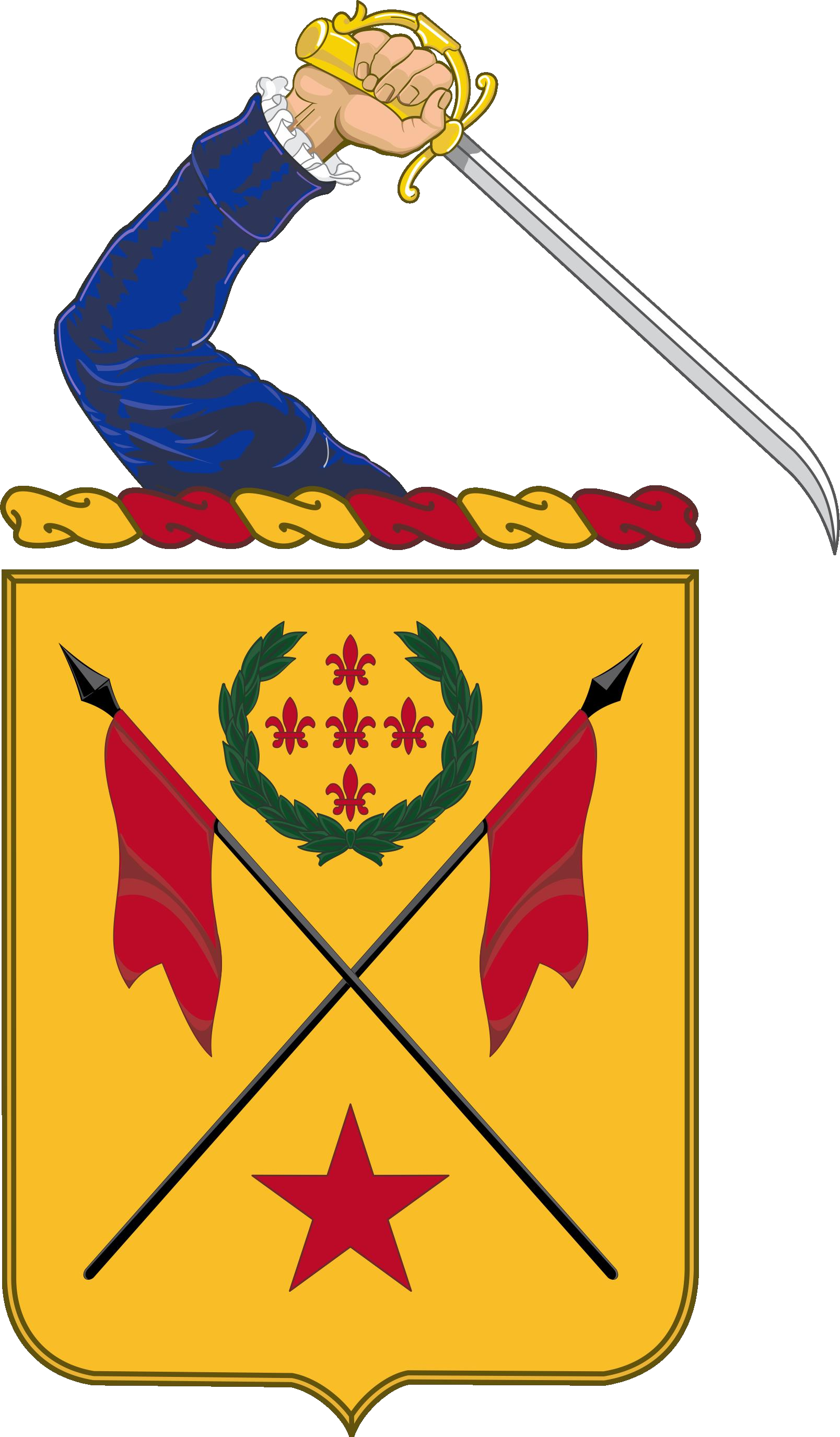
- coat of arms
- Active: 1921–1940
- Country: United States
- Branch: Massachusetts National Guard
- Size: Regiment

The 110th Cavalry Regiment was a regiment in the United States Army National Guard and was part of the Massachusetts Army National Guard.

== Interwar period ==
- Motto; "Union, Liberty and the Laws"

Constituted 1 June 1921 in the Massachusetts National Guard as the 110th Cavalry, assigned to the 23rd Cavalry Division, and partially organized as follows-

- 1st Squadron Cavalry, with headquarters and Troops A, B, and C, at Boston. (organized 5 March 1852 as 1st Battalion of Light Dragoons to consist of Troop A (National Lancers), and Troop B (Boston Light Dragoons). reorganized 20 August 1864 as independent companies of cavalry; Reconstituted 27 March 1865 as 1st Battalion of Cavalry; redesignated 19 March 1906 as 1st Squadron, Cavalry; Mustered into federal service 26 June 1916 for Mexican border duty and mustered out 18 November 1916. Drafted into federal service 5 August 1917; redesignated 102nd Machine Gun Battalion 26th Infantry Division, 17 August 1917; demobilized 29 April 1919 at Camp Devens Ma. Reorganized and federally recognized 24 June 1920 as 1st Separate Squadron, Cavalry; redesignated 23 March 1921 as 1st Squadron, Cavalry), redesignated 1st Squadron, 28 November 1921.
- Regimental Headquarters organized at Boston and federally recognized 3 July 1924 relieved from 23rd Cavalry Division, assigned to 22nd Cavalry Division, and allotted to the National Guard of the states of Massachusetts and Rhode Island 19 February 1927. Reorganized 24 February 1927 and 1st Squadron, Cavalry in Rhode Island with Headquarters and Troops A, B, and C at Providence (Organized 1908 as 1st Squadron, Cavalry; mustered into federal service 28 June 1916 for Mexican Border service and stationed at El Paso, Texas, mustered out 9 October – 6 November 1916; mustered into federal service 25 July 1917, drafted on 5 August 1917; broken up and redesignated as elements of the 26th Division, 20 August – 6 October 1917; demobilized 29 April 1919 at Camp Devens, Ma.; former 1st Squadron, Cavalry reconstituted, reorganized and federally recognized 9 March 1923), redesignated 2nd Squadron.

Allotted to the Massachusetts National Guard 1 April 1929; 2nd Squadron in Rhode Island converted and redesignated 2nd Battalion 103rd Field Artillery Regiment (United States), and new second Squadron organized at Allston and federally recognized 7 June 1929.

Reorganized 10 June 1937 and allotted to the National Guard of Massachusetts and Connecticut; concurrently Regimental Headquarters reorganized and federally recognized at West Hartford, Connecticut; remainder of regiment organized as follows-

- 1st Squadron in Ma. redesignated 3rd Squadron and reorganized at Allston to consist of Headquarters and Troops I, and K.
- 2nd Squadron with headquarters and troops E, and F, at Allston remained unchanged
- 1st Squadron 122nd Cavalry (organized as the Battalion of Governor's Horse Guards in October 1808 to contain the Governors Independent Volunteer Troop of Horse Guards [chartered 19 May 1788] at Hartford, and Second Company, Governor's Horse Guards [chartered in October 1808] at New Haven; redesignated Troops A, and B, 5th Militia Cavalry, 17 June 1915; mustered into federal service for Mexican border 20 June 1916, mustered out 28 October- 6 November 1916; reorganized and federally recognized 3 May 1917 as 1st Separate Squadron, Connecticut Cavalry; redesignated 3rd Separate Squadron, Connecticut Cavalry 19 May 1917; called into federal service 25 July 1917, drafted on 5 August 1917; converted and Redesignated 101st Machine Gun Battalion and assigned to the 26th division, 22 August 1917; demobilized 29 April 1919 at Camp Devens, Ma.; reorganized and federally recognized 9 March 1923 as 1st Squadron, Connecticut Cavalry with Headquarters and Troop A at New Haven and Troop B and C, at Hartford; redesignated 3 May 1929 as 1st squadron 122nd Cavalry), redesignated 1st Squadron.

Relieved from the 22nd Cavalry Division and assigned to the 21st Cavalry Division 1 April 1939. allotted to the Massachusetts National Guard 9 May 1940 and recognized as follows-

- Headquarters at West Hartford redesignated 16 May 1940 as Headquarters Battery 208th Coast Artillery (AA); concurrently new headquarters established at Boston.
- 1st Squadron with headquarters at New Haven, redesignated 16 May 1940 as 1st Battalion 208th Coast Artillery (AA); concurrently 3rd Squadron with headquarters at Allston redesignated 1st Squadron.

Relieved from the 21st Cavalry Division, converted and redesignated as the 180th Field Artillery Regiment (United States) 9 October 1940.

=== Coat of arms ===
The Shield is yellow for cavalry. The crossed guidons are those reputed to have been presented by Governor Edward Everett to the National Lancers. the motto was also that of the National Lancers. the fleurs-de-lis represents service in France during World War I while the red mullet was the distinguishing symbol used by the 102nd machine Gun Battalion during the war.
