= 104th Cavalry Regiment =

- coat of arms
- Active: 1921
- Country: United States
- Branch: Pennsylvania Army National Guard
- Mottos: OVER, UNDER OR THROUGH
- Branch color: Yellow

Commanders
- Notable commanders: Edward J. Stackpole

Insignia
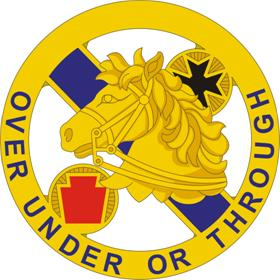
- Distinctive Unit Insignia

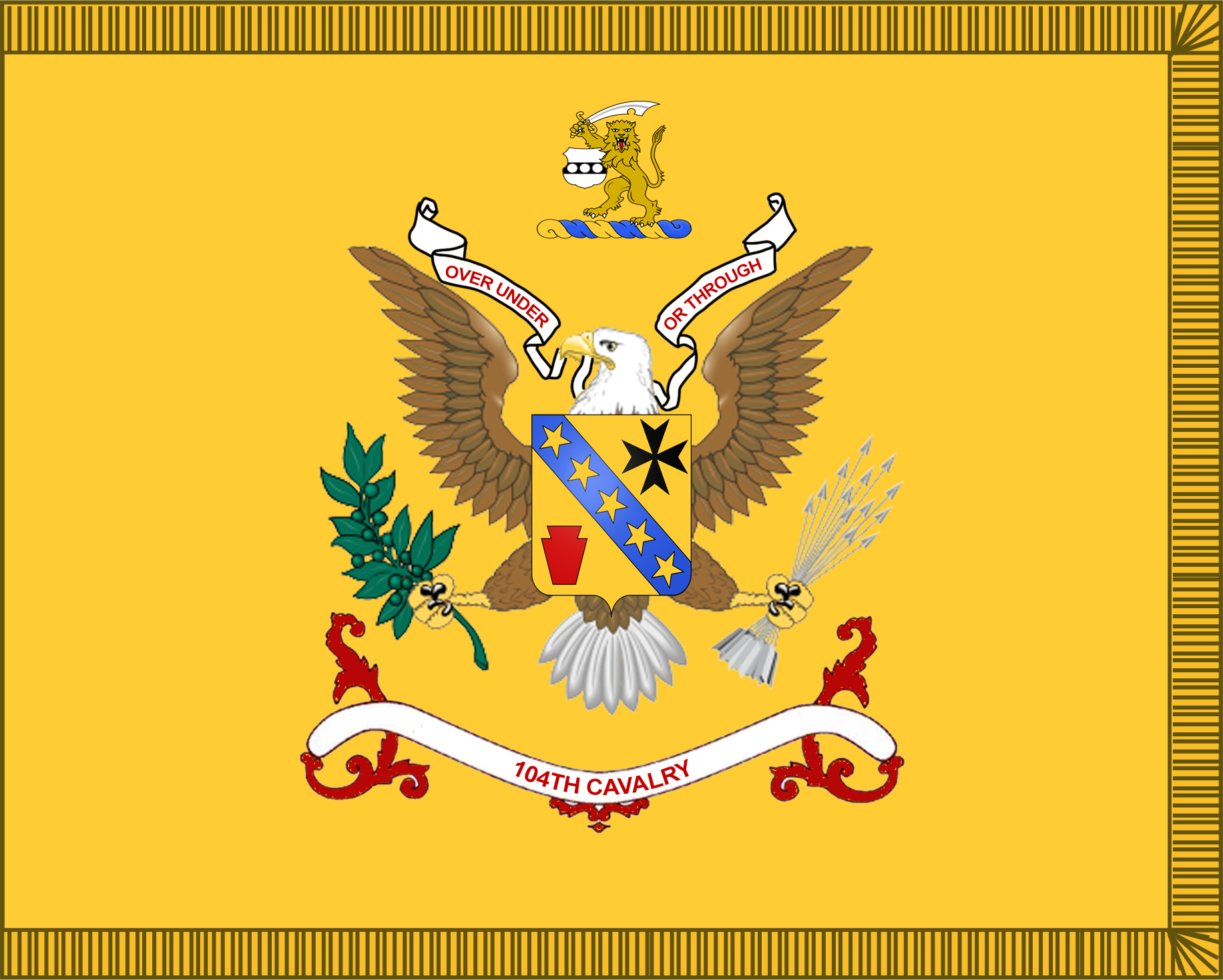
- 104th Armored Cavalry Regiment Flag

The 104th Cavalry Regiment is a Regiment of the United States Army first established in 1921. Troop A, 1st Squadron is one of several National Guard units with colonial roots and campaign credit for the War of 1812.

== History ==
=== As a mounted regiment ===
The 104th Cavalry Regiment was not actually organized as such until 1921, although some of its subordinate troops can trace their lineage back to the Revolutionary War and the War of 1812. For example, Troop A, 1st Squadron, also known as the First Troop Philadelphia City Cavalry, is the oldest active mounted unit in the United States Army. Troop B, 1st Squadron, is also known as the "State Fencibles" while Troop C, 1st Squadron, is also known as the "Governor's Troop."

The 104th Cavalry has gone through many configurations, its elements serving as the 1st Pennsylvania Cavalry and the 8th Pennsylvania Infantry in Puerto Rico during the Spanish–American War.

==== Mexican Expedition and World War I ====
On 6 July 1916, subordinate units of the regiment were mustered into Federal service for the Mexican border and stationed at El Paso, Texas. The unit was mustered out on 22 January 1917. On 15 July 1917, the regiment was drafted and mustered into federal service for World War I as the 103rd Headquarters Troop, 28th Division; and on 9 December 1917, as 103rd Trench Mortar Battery, 53d Field Artillery, 28th Division. It served in both France and Belgium and was mustered out on 12 April 1919, elements returning to state service as the 8th Pennsylvania with the regimental headquarters at Harrisburg.

==== Interwar period ====
The 104th Cavalry was constituted in the National Guard in 1921, assigned to the 21st Cavalry Division, and allotted to the state of Pennsylvania. It was organized on 1 June 1921 by the conversion and redesignation of the 8th Infantry Regiment, Pennsylvania National Guard (demobilized in May 1919 at Camp Dix, New Jersey, as elements of the 112th Infantry and other units in the 28th Division; reconstituted and federally recognized on 16 October 1919 as the 8th Infantry) as the 104th Cavalry. The regimental headquarters was organized and federally recognized at Harrisburg, Pennsylvania. Subordinate squadron headquarters were organized and federally recognized as follows: 1st Squadron organized at Tyrone; and 2nd Squadron organized on 20 July 1921 at Carlisle. Reorganized on 15 March 1929 as a three-squadron regiment, with a new 3rd Squadron headquarters organized at Harrisburg.

Parts of the regiment were called up to perform the following state duties: the entire regiment to perform strike duty at coal mines at Ebensburg and Cokeburg, 21 July–7 September 1922; Troops B and E for duty near Clarion to search for a downed airmail pilot from 6–11 October 1925; entire regiment to perform relief duties in connection with the flooding of the Schuylkill and Susquehanna Rivers in the spring of 1936. The regiment conducted annual summer training at Mount Gretna from 1921–35, and Indiantown Gap from 1936–39. Relieved from the 21st Cavalry Division in January 1939 and assigned to the 22nd Cavalry Division.

Composer Douglas Moore wrote the "104th Cavalry Regiment March" in 1924 in honor of the regiment.

=== As a "horse-mechanized" regiment ===
On 23 September 1940, the regiment was reorganized by combining it with elements of the 103rd Cavalry Regiment (which was concurrently converted into the 190th Field Artillery Regiment) and 28th Division and redesignating it the 104th Cavalry Regiment (Horse-Mechanized). It was relieved from assignment to the 22nd Cavalry Division the following month. The regiment now consisted of one mounted squadron and one mechanized (armored car) squadron.

Conversion of 104th Cavalry Regiment
Mounted unit	Horse-mechanized unit
HQ, 104th Cav. (Harrisburg)	HQ, 104th Cav.
HQ Troop, 104th Cav. (Harrisburg)	HQ Troop, 104th Cav.
Troop K, 104th Cav. (Harrisburg)	Service Troop, 104th Cav.
Med. Dept. Det., 104th Cav. (Harrisburg)	Med. Dept. Det., 104th Cav.
Band, 104th Cav. (Harrisburg)	Band, 104th Cav.
HQ 1st Sq., 103rd Cav. (Clearfield)	HQ 1st Sq. (Horse), 104th Cav.
HQ Troop, 52nd Cav. Brig. (Philadelphia)	Troop A (Horse), 104th Cav.
MG Troop, 103rd Cav. (Tyrone)	Troop B (Horse), 104th Cav.
Troop I, 104th Cav. (Harrisburg)	Troop C (Horse), 104th Cav.
HQ 3rd Sq., 104th Cav. (Harrisburg)	HQ 2nd Sq., 104th Cav.
Troop A, 103rd Cav. (Clearfield)	Troop D, 104th Cav.
MG Troop, 104th Cav. (Philadelphia)	Troop E, 104th Cav.
Troop F, 104th Cav. (Carlisle)	Troop F, 104th Cav.

On 17 February 1941, the regiment was inducted into federal service. After transfer to Salem, Oregon, the units of the regiment were retitled in this manner:

- Headquarters and Headquarters Troop became HHT, 104th Cavalry Group (Mechanized)
- 1st Squadron became the 104th Cavalry Reconnaissance Squadron (Mechanized)
- 2nd Squadron became the 119th Cavalry Reconnaissance Squadron (Mechanized)

The 104th Cavalry Group was not sent overseas. The group headquarters and the 119th C.R.S. were inactivated on 15 August 1944 at Camp Gruber, Oklahoma. The 104th C.R.S. was subordinated to the 115th Cavalry Group (Mechanized) and served in combat with the VI Corps in Germany in 1945. The 104th C.R.S. returned to the U.S. and was inactivated at Camp Miles Standish, Massachusetts, on 22 October 1945.

== Postwar ==
On 25 August 1952, the regiment was redesignated the 104th Armored Cavalry Regiment; on 1 June 1959, it was redesignated as the 1st Reconnaissance Squadron, 103rd Armor; on 1 April 1963, the 1st Reconnaissance Squadron, 223rd Cavalry; and finally, on 1 1 April 1975, as the 1st Squadron, 104th Cavalry, headquartered in Philadelphia, PA.

In 1980, elements of the 104th Cavalry were used as extras in the George C. Scott film Taps (film).

On 28 May 2002, elements of the 1st Squadron, 104th Cavalry Regiment were mustered into Federal service as Task Force Saber. TF Saber deployed to Bosnia Herzegovina as a part of SFOR 12 for a NATO peacekeeping mission earning the Governor's Unit Citation (Permanent Orders 97-2 dated 25 October 2006).

On 4 January 2005, Troop B, 1st Squadron, 104th Cavalry, augmented with platoons from Troops A and C, and teams from the 104th Infantry Detachment (Long Range Surveillance) were mustered into federal service as part of the 2d Brigade Combat Team, 28th Infantry Division. The HBCT was responsible for its own battle space as part of Ramadi under U.S. military occupation from July 2005 to July 2006 attached to the 2d Marine Division and then the 1st Marine Expeditionary Force, earning the Navy Unit Commendation twice (DA Memorandums AHRC-PDP-A, dated 20 July 2009 and 5 March 2010).

In 2003, the 2d Squadron was reformed and from 2003 to 2026 the regiment within the Pennsylvania Army National Guard, had two squadrons, one Armored (1st) and one Stryker (2d).

In 2005, the 2d Squadron was awarded the Governor's Unit Citation for Operation Katrina Relief (Hurricane Katrina, Louisiana)Permanent Orders 104-6.

In 2009, the 2d Squadron deployed to Taji, Iraq. Several company sized elements worked and lived on Joint Security Sites (JSSs) with their Iraqi counterparts. The 2d Squadron was awarded the Meritorious Unit Commendation by Permanent Orders 337-04.

The 1st Squadron was called upon and deployed to the Sinai Peninsula, Egypt in 2008 as part of the 51st rotation of the Multinational Force and Observers and deployed again in 2012-2013 to the State of Kuwait in support of Operation Enduring Freedom.

In 2014, the 1st Squadron was assigned to the 55th Heavy Brigade Combat Team, 28th Infantry Division. The 2d Squadron was assigned to the 56th Stryker Brigade Combat Team, 28th Infantry Division. As with most other Army units, there is no regimental headquarters, although a ceremonial regimental dining in is held annually in the Philadelphia area.

From 2020-2022 1st and 2nd squadron took part in Security operations in Philadelphia and The District of Columbia in response to BLM riots and January 6th.

After a long break in the deployment rotation, the 1st Squadron was then called up again and deployed to the Sinai Peninsula, Egypt in 2021 as part as the 69th rotation of the Multinational Force and Observers. The Squadron deployed with all of its troops, HHT, Alpha, Bravo, and Charlie.

2nd Squadron, with its headquarters in Reading, was inactivated in March 2026. This was part of the 56th Brigade's conversion to a Mobile Brigade Combat Team.

Previously the squadron had had its headquarters in Reading and the following troops:

  - Headquarters and Headquarters Troop, 2nd Squadron, 104th Cavalry Regiment, in Reading
  - Troop A, 2nd Squadron, 104th Cavalry Regiment, in Hazleton
  - Troop B, 2nd Squadron, 104th Cavalry Regiment, in Easton
  - Troop C, 2nd Squadron, 104th Cavalry Regiment, in Chambersburg
  - Troop D (Weapons), 2nd Squadron, 104th Cavalry Regiment, in Hamburg

== Current configuration ==
1st Squadron, 104th Cavalry Regiment, in Philadelphia

- Headquarters and Headquarters Troop, 1st Squadron, 104th Cavalry Regiment, in Philadelphia
- Troop A, 1st Squadron, 104th Cavalry Regiment, in Philadelphia
- Troop B, 1st Squadron, 104th Cavalry Regiment, in Philadelphia
- Troop C (Dismounted), 1st Squadron, 104th Cavalry Regiment, at Fort Indiantown Gap

== Distinctive unit insignia ==
- Description

A circular device, 1 1/4 inches (3.18 cm) in diameter, with the Regimental motto "Over, Under or Through," lettered around the outer circumference. Diagonal bar running from 10 o'clock to 4 o'clock, with horse's head superimposed thereon and filling the center of the circle. Red keystone between horse's head and 8 o'clock, Maltese cross between horse's head and 1 o'clock. Outer circumference and horse's head in yellow; motto and crossbar in blue; keystone in red; and Maltese cross in black.

- Symbolism

The shield is of yellow – the Cavalry color; the blue bend is for service as Infantry; the black Maltese cross is for the service in Puerto Rico; the red keystone is the Divisional insignia of the Twenty Eighth Division in which elements of the First Cavalry and the Eighth Infantry served.

- Background

The distinctive unit insignia was originally approved for the 104th Cavalry, Pennsylvania National Guard on 24 January 1924. It was redesignated for the 104th Cavalry Reconnaissance Squadron (Mechanized) on 8 June 1944. It was redesignated for the 104th Armored Cavalry Regiment on 25 August 1952. The insignia was redesignated for 104th Cavalry Regiment on 9 May 1989. It was amended to correct the previous designation dates and the symbolism on 17 October 2003.

== Coat of arms ==
=== Blazon ===
- Shield

Or on a bend Azure five mullets of the first between in sinister chief a Maltese cross Sable and in dexter base a keystone Gules.

- Crest

That for the regiments and separate battalions of the Pennsylvania Army National Guard: On a torse of the colors Or and Azure a lion rampant guardant Proper, holding in dexter paw a naked scimitar Argent hilted Or and in sinister an escutcheon on a fess Sable three plates. Motto OVER, UNDER OR THROUGH.

  - Symbolism
- Shield

The shield is of yellow – the Cavalry color; the blue bend is for service as Infantry; the black Maltese cross is for the service in Puerto Rico; the red keystone is the Divisional insignia of the Twenty Eighth Division in which elements of the First Cavalry and the Eighth Infantry served, and the five stars represent the five major operations of the Twenty Eight Division.

- Crest

The crest is that of the Pennsylvania Army National Guard.

- Background

The coat of arms was originally approved for the 104th Cavalry Regiment, Pennsylvania National Guard on 3 January 1924. It was redesignated for the 104th Cavalry Reconnaissance Squadron (Mechanized) on 6 June 1944. It was redesignated for the 104th Armored Cavalry Regiment on 25 August 1952. The coat of arms was redesignated for the 104th Cavalry Regiment on 9 May 1989.

== See also ==
- List of armored and cavalry regiments of the United States Army
