= 52nd =

52nd is the ordinal form of the number 52. 52nd or Fifty-second may also refer to:

- A fraction, 1/52, equal to one of 52 equal parts

== Geography ==
- 52nd meridian east, a line of longitude
- 52nd meridian west, a line of longitude
- 52nd parallel north, a circle of latitude
- 52nd parallel south, a circle of latitude
- 52nd Street (disambiguation)

== Military ==
- 52nd Brigade (disambiguation)
- 52nd Division (disambiguation)
- 52nd Regiment (disambiguation)
- 52nd Squadron (disambiguation)

== Other ==
- 52nd century
- 52nd century BC

== See also ==
- 52 (disambiguation)
