= 157th Field Artillery Battalion (United States) =

157th field Artillery Battalion
- Active: 1937
- Country: United States
- Allegiance: New Jersey
- Branch: New Jersey Army National Guard
- Type: Combat arms
- Patron: Saint Barbara
- Motto(s): In Via (On the way)
- Branch color: Scarlet

The 157th Field Artillery Battalion was a Field Artillery battalion of the Army National Guard.

== Designation ==
There were two unrelated units issued this number; the new Jersey unit predates the Colorado unit.

== Lineage ==
Organized in the New Jersey National Guard as the 3rd Battalion, 157th Field Artillery and Federally recognized 16 June 1937 at Vineland.

Inducted into Federal service 16 September 1940 at Vineland as an element of the 44th Infantry Division.

Redesignated 7 January 1941 as the 2nd Battalion, 157th Field artillery.

Reorginazed and redesignated as the 157th Field Artillery Battalion and assigned to the 44th Infantry Division. 17 February 1942.

Relieved from the 44th Infantry Division and inactivated at Camp Chaffee, Arkansas, 12 November 1945.

Redesignated 9 July 1946 as the 114th Tank Battalion.

== Current units ==
See 102nd Cavalry Regiment (United States)

== Coat of arms ==
- Shield

Gules a Gatling gun or, in base a giant cactus and shoulder sleeve insignia of the 29th Infantry Division proper, on a canton argent a saltire azure.

- Crest

That for the New Jersey National Guard.

- Background

The Shield is red for artillery. The Gatling gun refers to association with the 157th and 112th Field artillery regiments of New Jersey. Service of elements of the battalion is represented by the giant cactus for the Mexican border, the shoulder sleeve insignia of the 29th Division for service in France during World War I, and the canton for Civil War service.

157_FA_Regiment_DUI.jpg

== Campaign credits ==
World War II

- Northern France
- Rhineland
- Ardennes-Alsace
- Central Europe

== Decorations ==
None

== See also ==
- Field Artillery Branch (United States)
- U.S. Army Regimental System
- List of field artillery regiments of the United States
