= 102nd Cavalry Regiment =

US cavalry regiment

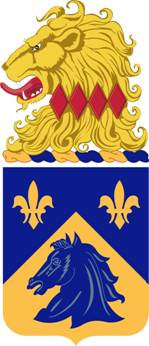
- Coat of arms
- Founded: 1913
- Country: United States of America
- Part of: United States Army; N.J. Army National Guard
- Mottos: "Show 'em the Way" "Fide et Fortitudine" ("Faithfulness and Strength", prior to reconsolidation with 117th Cavalry in 2008)
- Branch color: Yellow

Commanders
- Current commander: Lieutenant Colonel Ryan Harty Command Sergeant Major Paul Greenberg
- Notable commanders: Donald W. McGowan; Cyrus A. Dolph III

Insignia
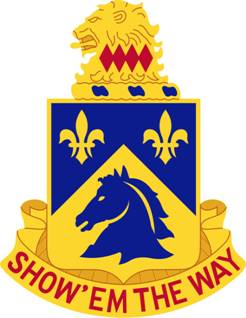
- Distinctive unit insignia

The 102nd Cavalry Regiment is a cavalry regiment of the United States Army first established in 1921. It has seen service in the Second World War, including in Normandy and at the Battle of the Bulge, in Iraq 2008–2009, in Jordan and Somalia in 2019, Syria in 2024, plus many exercises and Hurricane Sandy and Hurricane Maria relief. Its tradition of service is carried on today by the 1st Squadron 102nd Cavalry Regiment.

== History ==
The 1st New Jersey Cavalry Regiment was raised for the American Civil War. It was mustered out at Cloud's Hills, Virginia, in 1865.

On 29 May 1913, the 1st Cavalry Squadron, New Jersey National Guard was organized with headquarters at Newark. On 17 August 1921 the 1st Cavalry Squadron NJ NG was designated as the 102nd Cavalry. However the lineage of the 1st New Jersey Cavalry was not officially carried over to the 102nd Cavalry, apparently due to the lapse in existence between 1865 and 1913.

=== Interwar period ===
The 102nd Cavalry was constituted in the National Guard in 1921, assigned to the 51st Cavalry Brigade, 21st Cavalry Division, and allotted to the state of New Jersey. It was organized on 17 August 1921 by redesignation of the 1st Regiment, New Jersey Cavalry (organized and federally recognized on 29 April 1921) as the 102nd Cavalry. The regimental headquarters was organized and federally recognized at Newark, New Jersey. Subordinate squadron headquarters were organized and federally recognized as follows: 1st Squadron organized on 17 August 1921 at West Orange, New Jersey; 2nd Squadron organized at Westfield, New Jersey. Relieved in May 1927 from the 21st Cavalry Division. Reorganized on 15 March 1929 as a three-squadron regiment; new 3rd Squadron organized with headquarters at Newark. Assigned to the separate 59th Cavalry Brigade on 12 June 1937. Further reassigned to the 21st Cavalry Division along with the brigade on 1 April 1939. The regiment, or elements thereof, was called up for the following state duties: escort for General John J. Pershing at Camp Merritt on 31 May 1924; escort to President Calvin Coolidge on 4 July 1926 at the opening of the Camden-Philadelphia Bridge; march unit in President Herbert Hoover’s inaugural parade in 1929; New Jersey representative military unit in 1931 at the celebration of the 150th anniversary of the British surrender at Yorktown. Conducted annual summer training at Sea Girt, New Jersey, from 1921–36, and Indiantown Gap, Pennsylvania, in 1937. Relieved on 1 October 1940 from the 21st Cavalry Division. Reorganized and redesignated the 102nd Cavalry Regiment (Horse and Mechanized) on 16 November 1940. Assigned to the I Corps on 30 December 1940. Inducted into active federal service on 6 January 1941 at home stations and transferred to Fort Jackson, South Carolina, arriving there on 16 January 1941.

=== World War II ===
The regiment was reorganized in 1943 and 1944. The 1st Squadron was redesignated the 102nd Cavalry Reconnaissance Squadron (Mechanized) while the 2nd Squadron became the 117th Cavalry Reconnaissance Squadron (Mechanized). The regimental headquarters troop became the headquarters of the 102nd Cavalry Group (Mechanized) on 2 January 1944 in Exeter, England. With the 38th and 102nd Cavalry Reconnaissance Squadrons under its command, the group saw combat in northwest Europe during World War II with the V Corps. The group fought in the Normandy, Northern France, Rhineland, Ardennes-Alsace, and Central Europe campaigns. Following the war, the 102nd Group was inactivated on 22 October 1945 at Camp Myles Standish, Massachusetts. The 117th Cavalry Reconnaissance Squadron was shipped to Algeria and later fought in Italy, southern France, Alsace, and Germany.

Following a series of postwar reorganizations and a period in which the unit was known as the 102nd Armor Regiment, the unit was consolidated with the 117th Cavalry Regiment on 1 August 2008, and designated the 102nd Cavalry Regiment, with a single squadron which was part of the 50th Infantry Brigade Combat Team. On 15 June 2017, the 50th IBCT was reflagged as the 44th Infantry Brigade Combat Team to reflect the brigade's lineage as of the 44th Infantry Division.

=== Twenty-first century ===
- 2008-2009 Iraq Deployment
  - HHT Camp Bucca
  - A Troop Camp Bucca.
  - B Troop FOB Grizzly.
- 2012 Hurricane Sandy Relief
- Security for 2015 visit by Pope Francis
- 2017 Puerto Rico Hurricane Maria Disaster Response
- 1st Squadron, 102nd Cavalry Regiment, 44th Infantry Brigade Combat Team, mobilized onto Title 10 Active Duty status out of Fort Bliss, TX in January 2019 and deployed in support of Operation Spartan Shield to Jordan and Somalia.
  - HHT, A Troop, B Troop, and Delta Company of the 250th BSB were deployed to the Joint Training Center Jordan under Task Force Spartan-Jordan to train, advise, and assist Jordanian Armed Forces through the Jordan Operational Engagement Program. As well as participate and facilitate Operation Eager Lion 2019, an annual multinational military training event.
  - C Troop was deployed to Somalia to guard Baledogle Airfield, located 60 miles northwest of Mogadishu, Somalia's capital. On 30 September 2019, they came under attack from Al-Shabaab by VBIED and multiple dismounts, eventually repelling the attack. The attack was the largest involving Somali insurgents and U.S. forces since the Battle of Mogadishu.
  - The 1-102nd Cavalry demobilized out of Fort Bliss, Texas and returned to New Jersey in December 2019.
- COVID-19
  - The squadron provided soldiers for many COVID-19 missions. From medics to assist in veterans homes to soldiers to setup and operate COVID-19 vaccination distribution centers across the state.
- 2021 Washington, D.C. Mission
  - Providing security for the United States Capitol from January 9th to May 28th, the Naval Observatory, the 2021 Presidential Inauguration, and the 2021 State of the Union Address.
- 2023 JRTC Rotation
- 2024 Mobilization and deployment for Operation Inherent Resolve to Al-Tanf, Syria within the deconfliction zone along the tri-country border with Iraq and Jordan.

=== Current configuration ===
The 1st Squadron serves as the Reconnaissance Surveillance and Target Acquisition (RSTA) Squadron for the 44th Infantry Brigade Combat Team, 42nd Infantry Division, NY

- Headquarters and Headquarters Troop (HHT), Westfield, NJ
- A Troop (Mounted), Dover, NJ
- B Troop (Mounted), West Orange, NJ
- C Troop (Dismounted), Hackettstown, NJ
- D Company, 250th Brigade Support Battalion (D-250th BSB) (Forward Support Company), Westfield, NJ

The 2nd, 3rd, and 4th Squadrons of the regiment are inactive.

== Campaign Participation ==
World War I

- Meuse-Argonne
- Alsace 1918

World War II

- Rome-Arno
- Normandy (with arrowhead)
- Northern France
- Southern France (with arrowhead)
- Rhineland
- Ardennes-Alsace
- Central Europe

War on terrorism

- Iraq: Iraqi Surge
- Syria: Operation Inherent Resolve

== Awards and decorations ==
French Croix de Guerre with Palm, World War II, Streamer embroidered BEACHES OF NORMANDY. Awarded to 102d Cav Group (Mecz), Hq & Hq Troop, 102d Cav Rcn Sq (Mecz) (Atchd to 29th Inf Div).

- Awarded under Decision No.268, 22 July 1946, by Charles de Gaulle, the President of the Provisional Government of the French Republic, with the following citation: (for citation, see "29th Infantry Division").

"A splendid unit animated by the highest military virtues. During the landing operations of 6 June 1944, it displayed extraordinary heroism. Its mission was to seize positions strongly held by an enemy determined to defend itself at any cost. This unit landed on a heavily mined beach and was subjected to violent fire from weapons of every caliber. After having seized cliffs of vital importance, it attacked and seized Saint-Laurent-sur-Mer. In spite of heavy losses in personnel and materiel, it defended the occupied ground, which covered the advance on Isigny. By seizing its assigned objectives, it contributed in a great measure to the defeat of the enemy and the liberation of France."

French Croix de Guerre with Palm, World War II, Streamer embroidered PROVENCE TO LORRAINE. Awarded to 117th Cav Rcn Sq (Mecz).

- Awarded under Decision No.267, 22 July 1946, by Charles de Gaulle, the President of the Provisional Government of the French Republic, with the following citation:

"An elite unit which, after landing in Provence, fought without stopping in the advance guard of the 7th U.S. Army up to the marches of Lorraine. As a reconnaissance group of the 7th U. S. Army, it made a successful landing on the beaches of Ste. Maxine and St. Tropez. On the second day, it demonstrated the finest qualities of skill in maneuvering and contributed to the success of the action of this group, especially the annihilation of important enemy forces 8 in the region of Montelimar. Under the forceful direction of an energetic chief and with remarkable daring, it preceded its group by more than 180 kilometers without hesitation. It occupied, by surprise, important positions and a network of communications in this region, inflicting on the enemy important losses in materiel, and captured more than 2,500 prisoners, three of whom were generals. During this period, it worked in close liaison with the local resistance elements and coordinated the activity of the Maquis who were associated with it."

When a unit is mentioned twice, it is awarded the fourragère of the Croix de Guerre. This fourragère is worn by all men in the unit, but it can be worn on a personal basis: those permanently assigned to a unit, at the time of the mentions, were entitled to wear the fourragère for the remainder of service in the military.

Troop C (Hackettstown), 1st Squadron, additionally entitled to:

- War on Terrorism, Iraq Campaign: Streamer with National Resolution

Troop B (West Orange), 1st Squadron, additionally entitled to:

- World War II Asiatic-Pacific Theater, Streamer without inscription

Troop A (Dover), 1st Squadron, additionally entitled to:

- Meritorious Unit Commendation (Army), Streamer embroidered IRAQ SEP 2008-MAY 2009
- Belgian fourragère, awarded to 102d Cav Rcn Sq (Mecz), Troop A. The Belgian fourragère is not authorized to be worn temporarily.
- CITED IN THE ORDER OF THE DAY of the Belgian Army, by Decree No.6133, 18 June 1949, by the Ministry of National Defense, Regent of the Kingdom, with the following citation:

"During the period 7 to 13 September 1944, they penetrated Belgian territory and attacked the enemy in the Beauraing-Saint Hubert-Marche-Laroche-St. Vith sector. This attack, conducted with success, drove the enemy from southeastern Belgium and forced them to fall back in this region, upon the defenses of the Siegfried Line."

- CITED IN THE ORDER OF THE DAY of the Belgian Army, by Decree No.6133, 18 June 1949, by the Ministry of National Defense, Regent of the Kingdom, with the following citation:

"From 20 December 1944 until 26 January 1945, during the German Ardennes offensive, the 9th United States Infantry Division and the units attached to it were assigned to defend the northern flank of the counteroffensive conducted by the V Corps of the United States in the Eupen, Belgium, Montjoie, Germany, sector. Pressing the attack without respite in the face of a stubborn defense, the enemy was incapable of expanding the breach caused by this break-through. After the enemy attack had been contained successfully, the 9th United States Division and the units attached to it took up the attack themselves and forced the German army to fall back and leave the territory of Belgium in this area."

== Lineage ==
Organized 29 May 1913 in the New Jersey National Guard as the 1st Cavalry Squadron with headquarters at Newark

- Mustered into federal service 21 June 1916 at Sea Girt; mustered out of federal service 21 October 1916 at Newark
- Mustered into federal service 28 July 1917 at Sea Girt; drafted into federal service 5 August 1917

Squadron broken up 15 September 1917 and its elements reorganized and redesignated as follows:

- Squadron (less Troops B and D) reorganized and redesignated as the 104th Train Headquarters and Military Police, an element of the 29th Division
- Troops B and D, 1st Cavalry Squadron, consolidated to form Battery F, 110th Field Artillery, an element of the 29th Division

After 15 September 1917 the above units underwent changes as follows:

- 104th Train Headquarters and Military Police (less Company B), reorganized and redesignated 1 November 1918 as the 29th Military Police Company, an element of the 29th Division. Demobilized 30 May 1919 at Camp Dix, New Jersey
- Company B, 104th Train Headquarters and Military Police, reorganized and redesignated 29 October 1918 as Company C, First Army Military Police Battalion, and relieved from assignment to the 29th Division. Redesignated 15 March 1919 as the 216th Company, Military Police Corps. Demobilized 14 July 1919 at Camp Dodge, Iowa
- Battery F, 110th Field Artillery, redesignated 27 November 1917 as Battery F, 112th Field Artillery, an element of the 29th Division. Demobilized 31 May 1919 at Camp Dix, New Jersey

Former 1st Cavalry Squadron reorganized 1919–1920 in the New Jersey National Guard; Headquarters federally recognized 29 September 1920 at Newark

- Expanded, reorganized, and redesignated 1 March 1921 as the 1st Cavalry, with headquarters at Newark
- Reorganized and redesignated 17 August 1921 as the 102d Cavalry
- Assigned in June 1937 to the 21st Cavalry Division
- Relieved 16 November 1940 from assignment to the 21st Cavalry Division
- Inducted into federal service 6 January 1941 at home stations

2d Squadron withdrawn 30 November 1943, reorganized, and redesignated as the 117th Cavalry Reconnaissance Squadron, Mechanized (1st Squadron – see ANNEX 1 [remainder of 102d Cavalry—hereafter separate lineages])

- 117th Cavalry Reconnaissance Squadron, Mechanized, inactivated 25 November 1945 in Germany
- Reorganized and federally recognized 20 November 1946 at West Orange as the 117th Cavalry Reconnaissance Squadron
- Reorganized and redesignated 1 November 1949 as the 2d Battalion, 102d Armored Cavalry
- Consolidated 1 February 1968 with the 6th Battalion, 50th Armor (see ANNEX 2), and consolidated unit reorganized and redesignated as the 102d Armor, a parent regiment under the Combat Arms Regimental System, to consist of the 1st and 2d Battalions
- Consolidated 1 December 1971 with the 50th Armor (see ANNEXES 3, 4, and 5) and consolidated unit designated as the 102d Armor to consist of the 1st and 2d Battalions and the 3d, 4th, and 5th Battalions, elements of the 50th Armored Division
- Reorganized 1 July 1975 to consist of the 1st, 2d, 3d, and 5th Battalions, elements of the 50th Armored Division
- Withdrawn 1 June 1989 from the Combat Arms Regimental System and reorganized under the United States Army Regimental System
- Reorganized 1 September 1991 to consist of the 2d and 3d Battalions, elements of the 50th Armored Division
- Reorganized 1 September 1993 to consist of the 2d and 3d Battalions, elements of the 42d Infantry Division
- Reorganized 1 September 1994 to consist of the 2d Battalion, an element of the 42d Infantry Division
- Ordered into active federal service 12 – 27 April 2004 at home stations; released from active federal service 11 – 26 April 2005 and reverted to state control

Redesignated 1 October 2005 as the 102d Armored Regiment

- (Ordered into active federal service 16 June 2008 at home stations)
- Consolidated 1 September 2008 with the 117th Cavalry Regiment (see ANNEX 1) and consolidated unit designated as the 102d Cavalry Regiment, to consist of the 1st Squadron, an element of the 50th Infantry Brigade Combat Team
- Released from active federal service 20 July 2009 and reverted to state control

=== ANNEX 1 ===
- Organized and federally recognized 29 April 1921 in the New Jersey National Guard from new and existing elements as the 1st Squadron, 1st Cavalry, with headquarters at Newark
- (1st Cavalry redesignated 17 August 1921 as the 102d Cavalry)
- Assigned in June 1937 to the 21st Cavalry Division
- Relieved 16 November 1940 from assignment to the 21st Cavalry Division
- Inducted into federal service 6 January 1941 at home stations
- Reorganized, and redesignated 2 January 1944 as the 102d Cavalry Reconnaissance Squadron, Mechanized (remainder of 102d Cavalry—hereafter separate lineage)
- Inactivated 23 October 1945 at Camp Shanks, New York
- Westfield elements reorganized and federally recognized 26 September 1946 as the 50th Cavalry Reconnaissance Squadron, with headquarters at Westfield, and assigned to the 50th Armored Division (remainder of 102d Cavalry Reconnaissance Squadron, Mechanized—hereafter separate lineage)
- Redesignated in 1947 as the 50th Mechanized Cavalry Reconnaissance Squadron
- Reorganized and redesignated 1 March 1949 as the 50th Reconnaissance Battalion
- Reorganized and redesignated 1 March 1959 as the 5th Reconnaissance Squadron, 50th Armor, an element of the 50th Armored Division
- Reorganized and redesignated 31 January 1963 as the 117th Cavalry, a parent regiment under the Combat Arms Regimental System, to consist of the 5th Squadron, an element of the 50th Armored Division
- (Troop B allotted 1 February 1968 to the New York Army National Guard; withdrawn 1 April 1975 from the New York Army National Guard; allotted 1 July 1975 to the New Jersey Army National Guard. Troop C allotted 1 February 1968 to the Vermont Army National Guard; withdrawn 16 October 1984 from the Vermont Army National Guard; allotted 2 October 1986 to the New Jersey Army National Guard)
- Withdrawn 1 June 1989 from the Combat Arms Regimental System and reorganized under the United States Army Regimental System
- Reorganized 1 September 1993 to consist of the 5th Squadron, an element of the 42d Infantry Division
- Redesignated 1 October 2005 as the 117th Cavalry Regiment
- Ordered into active federal service 16 June 2008 at home stations

=== ANNEX 2 ===
- Organized and federally recognized 13 February 1951 in the New Jersey Army National Guard as the 3d Battalion, 102d Armored Cavalry, with headquarters at Phillipsburg
- Reorganized and redesignated 1 May 1954 as the 250th Tank Battalion
- Reorganized and redesignated 1 March 1959 as the 2d Medium Tank Battalion, 53d Armor
- Redesignated 31 January 1963 as the 2d Battalion, 53d Armor
- Redesignated 15 April 1964 as the 6th Battalion, 50th Armor

=== ANNEX 3 ===
- Organized and federally recognized 16 June 1937 in the New Jersey National Guard from existing units as the 3d Battalion, 157th Field Artillery, an element of the 44th Division (later redesignated as the 44th Infantry Division), with headquarters at Vineland
- Inducted into federal service 16 September 1940 at home stations
- Redesignated 7 January 1941 as the 2d Battalion, 157th Field Artillery Regiment
- Reorganized and redesignated 20 February 1942 as the 157th Field Artillery
- Inactivated 12 November 1945 at Camp Chaffee, Arkansas, and relieved from assignment to the 44th Infantry Division
- Converted and redesignated 5 July 1946 as the 114th Tank Battalion and assigned to the 50th Armored Division
- Reorganized and federally recognized 21 November 1946 with headquarters at Vineland
- Redesignated 1 March 1949 as the 114th Medium Tank Battalion
- Redesignated 1 December 1952 as the 114th Tank Battalion
- Consolidated 1 March 1959 with the 644th Tank Battalion (see ANNEX 4), 113th Tank Battalion (see ANNEX 5), 215th Tank Battalion (organized and federally recognized 11 April 1947 with headquarters at Dumont), and the 50th Reconnaissance Battalion (organized and federally recognized 26 September 1946 from existing units with headquarters at Westfield) and consolidated unit reorganized and redesignated as the 50th Armor, a parent regiment under the Combat Arms Regimental System, to consist of the 1st, 2d, 3d, and 4th Medium Tank Battalions and the 5th Reconnaissance Squadron, elements of the 50th Armored Division
- Reorganized 31 January 1963 to consist of the 1st, 2d, 3d, 4th, and 6th Battalions, elements of the 50th Armored Division (5th Reconnaissance Squadron [formerly the 50th Reconnaissance Battalion] concurrently withdrawn, reorganized, and redesignated as the 117th Cavalry – see ANNEX 1)
- Reorganized 1 February 1968 to consist of the 1st, 2d, and 3d Battalions, elements of the 50th Armored Division (4th Battalion [formerly the 215th Tank Battalion] reorganized and redesignated as the 3d Squadron, 104th Armored Cavalry—hereafter separate lineage)

=== ANNEX 4 ===
- Constituted 3 December 1941 in the Army of the United States as the 644th Tank Destroyer Battalion, Light
- Organized 15 December 1941 at Fort Dix, New Jersey, from the Anti-tank Battalion (Provisional) of the 44th Division (organized 1 July 1941 at Fort Dix, New Jersey)
- Allotted 13 March 1942 to the New Jersey National Guard
- Inactivated 5 December 1945 at Camp Patrick Henry, Virginia
- Reorganized and federally recognized 18 November 1946 in eastern New Jersey as the 644th Tank Battalion with headquarters at Red Bank
- Redesignated 1 March 1949 as the 644th Heavy Tank Battalion and assigned to the 50th Armored Division
- Redesignated 1 December 1952 as the 644th Tank Battalion

=== ANNEX 5 ===
- Constituted 9 July 1946 in the New Jersey National Guard as the 113th Tank Battalion and assigned to the 50th Armored Division
- Organized and federally recognized 8 April 1947 in eastern New Jersey with headquarters at Orange
- (Location of headquarters changed 31 December 1947 to Dover)
- Redesignated 1 March 1949 as the 113th Medium Tank Battalion
- Redesignated 1 December 1952 as the 113th Tank Battalion

== Distinctive unit insignia ==
- Description

A Gold color metal and enamel device 1 1/8 inches (2.9 cm) in height overall blazoned: SHIELD: Per chevron enhanced Azure an Or, on the first two fleurs-de-lis of the second, in base a horse's head erased of the first. CREST: On a wreath of the colors Or and Azure, a lion's head Or collared four fusils Gules. Attached below and to the sides of the shield a Gold scroll inscribed "SHOW ‘EM THE WAY" in Red.

- Symbolism

SHIELD: The division of the shield per chevron alludes to the assault on the Normandy Beach. The two fleurs-de-lis represent service in Europe during World Wars I and II. The horse's head is from the historic crest of the Essex Troop. CREST: The crest is that of the New Jersey Army National Guard.

- Background

The distinctive unit insignia was originally approved for the 117th Cavalry Regiment on 20 November 1964. It was amended to revise the symbolism on 23 February 1972. The insignia was redesignated effective 1 September 2008, for the 102d Cavalry Regiment with the description updated.

== Coat of arms ==
- Blazon
  - Shield: Per chevron enhanced Azure and Or, on the first two fleurs-de-lis of the second, in base a horse's head erased of the first.
  - Crest: That for the regiments and separate battalions of the New Jersey Army National Guard: From a wreath Or and Azure, a lion's head erased Or collared four fusils Gules.
  - Motto: SHOW ‘EM THE WAY.
- Symbolism
  - Shield: The division of the shield per chevron alludes to the assault on the Normandy Beach. The two fleurs-de-lis represent service in Europe during World Wars I and II. The horse's head is from the historic crest of the Essex Troop.
- Background: The coat of arms was originally approved for the 117th Cavalry Regiment on 20 November 1964. It was amended to revise the symbolism on 23 February 1972. The insignia was redesignated effective 1 September 2008, for the 102d Cavalry Regiment

== See also ==
- List of armored and cavalry regiments of the United States Army
- Rhino tank
