= Edward H. Wolfe =

Edward H. Wolfe (September 26, 1834 – August 17, 1916) was a Union Army officer during the American Civil War

Edward H. Wolfe was born April 26, 1834, at Rushville, Indiana. He attended Miami University (Ohio) and Hanover College. He was a merchant before the Civil War.

Wolfe was appointed major on the 52nd Indiana Infantry Regiment, October 25, 1861. He was promoted to lieutenant colonel, April 26, 1862, and colonel, September 19, 1862. He commanded Brigade 3, Division 3, XVI Corps (Union Army), Army of the Tennessee between January 25, 1864, and February 28, 1864, between May 21, 1864, and September 2, 1864 and between October 1864 and December 5, 1864. He commanded Brigade 3, Division 2, Detachment of XVI Corps in the Department of the Cumberland from December 5, 1864, to February 18, 1865. He was mustered out of the volunteers on January 31, 1865.

On June 27, 1868, President Andrew Johnson nominated Wolfe for appointment to the grade of brevet brigadier general of volunteers, to rank from March 13, 1865, for his service at the Battle of Nashville, and the United States Senate confirmed the appointment on July 18, 1868.

After the war, Wolfe was Indiana State Auditor from 1881 until 1883.

Edward H. Wolfe died at Rushville, Indiana on August 17, 1916. He was buried at East Hill Cemetery (Rushville, Indiana).

== See also ==
- List of American Civil War brevet generals (Union)
