= 52 =

52 may refer to:

- 52 (number), the natural number following 51 and preceding 53
- one of the years 52 BC, AD 52, 1952, 2052
- 52-hertz whale an individual male whale, also known as the loneliest whale, calling at the unusual 52 hertz range
- 52 (comics), a 2006–07 American weekly comic book series
- 52 (album series), series of albums by American singer Kristian Bush
- 52 Europa, a main-belt asteroid
- Tatra 52, a mid-size car
- Telephone numbers in Mexico Telephone country code 52

== See also ==
- 52nd (disambiguation)
