= Kuliev Cavalry Group =

- Active: Mid July 1941 - September 1941.
- Country: Soviet Union
- Branch: Cavalry
- Role: Breakthrough and Exploitation in Deep Operations
- Size: Group

Commanders
- Notable commanders: Colonel Kuliev

The Kuliev Cavalry Group was a cavalry formation of the Red Army during World War II.

It was formed in mid July 1941 under the command of the 21st Cavalry Division's commander.

The group operated as a raiding force on the southern flank of the German penetration at Smolensk. It spent most of July and August in the Rostov area, usually under the direct control of Army Group Kachalov during the Battle of Smolensk. When 2nd Panzer Group turned south into the flank and rear of the Southwestern Theater it went right through the group staging area. The group retreated and was disbanded in September.

== Composition ==
- 21st Mountain Cavalry Division
- 52nd Cavalry Division
