= 52nd Infantry Division (South Korea) =

Republic of Korea Army division

- Active: 7 January 1984 - present
- Country: South Korea
- Branch: Republic of Korea Army
- Type: Infantry
- Role: Reserve forces
- Size: Division
- Part of: Capital Defense Command
- Garrison/HQ: Gwangmyeong, Gyeonggi
- Nickname(s): "Arrow"
- Colors: Blue

Commanders
- Current commander: Maj. Gen. Kim Gyu-ha

The 52nd Homeland Defense Infantry Division (Korean: 제52보병사단) is a military formation of the ROKA. The 52nd division is subordinated to the Capital Defense Command and is headquartered in Gwangmyeong City, Gyeonggi Province. Its responsibility is the defense of Seoul and recruit training.

The division was created on 7 January 1984.

== Organization ==
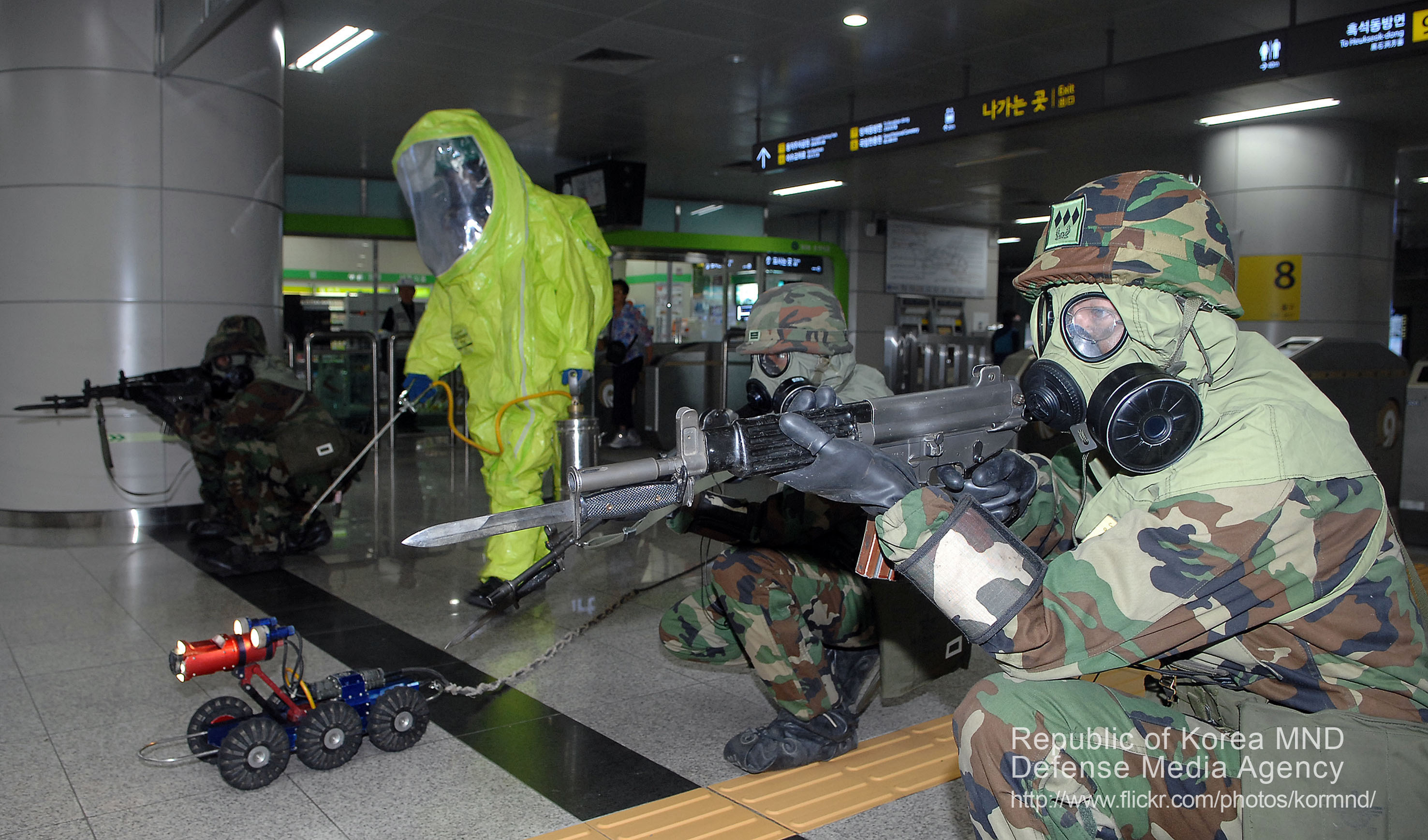
Soldiers of the 52nd Infantry Division on the exercise against terrorists attacks in 2011.

- Headquarters:
  - Reconnaissance Battalion
  - Engineer Battalion
  - Mobile Battalion
  - Signal Battalion
  - Support Battalion
  - Military Police Battalion
  - Medical Battalion
  - Chemical Battalion
  - Intelligence Company
  - Headquarters Company
- 210th Infantry Brigade
- 212th Infantry Brigade
- 213th Infantry Brigade
