= 52nd Street =

52nd Street may refer to:

- 52nd Street (Manhattan), a street in Manhattan, New York City, United States
- 52nd Street (album), an album by Billy Joel
- 52nd Street (band), an English jazz-funk band
- 52nd Street (film), a 1937 film starring Ian Hunter

== Railway stations ==
- 52nd Street (IRT Flushing Line), a station on the New York City Subway
- 52nd Street station (Market–Frankford Line), a SEPTA station on the Market–Frankford Line in Philadelphia
- 52nd Street station (SEPTA Regional Rail), a regional rail station in Philadelphia which closed in 1980
- 52nd Street (BMT Fifth Avenue Line), a demolished station in Brooklyn
