= 52nd Indiana Infantry Regiment =

52nd Regiment Indiana Infantry
- Active: February 1, 1862 – September 10, 1865
- Country: United States
- Allegiance: Union
- Branch: Infantry
- Engagements: Battle of Fort Donelson; Siege of Corinth; Meridian Campaign; Red River Campaign; Battle of Pleasant Hill; Battle of Nashville; Mobile Campaign; Battle of Fort Blakeley

The 52nd Regiment Indiana Infantry was an infantry regiment that served in the Union Army during the American Civil War.

== Service ==
The 52nd Indiana Infantry was organized at Rushville and Indianapolis, Indiana and mustered in for a three-year enlistment on February 1, 1862.

The regiment was attached to 1st Brigade, 3rd Division, Army of the Tennessee, to March 1862. Garrison Forts Henry and Donelson, Tennessee, to April 1862. 1st Brigade, 4th Division, Army of the Tennessee, to May 1862. 2nd Brigade, 4th Division, Army of the Tennessee, to July 1862. 2nd Brigade, 4th Division, District of Memphis, Tennessee, to September 1862. Garrison Fort Pillow, Tennessee, to November 1862. District of Columbus, Kentucky, XIII Corps, Department of the Tennessee, to January 1863. District of Columbus, Kentucky, 6th Division, XVI Corps, to January 1864. 3rd Brigade, 3rd Division, XVI Corps, to December 1864. 3rd Brigade, 2nd Division (detachment), Army of the Tennessee, Department of the Cumberland, to February 1865. 3rd Brigade, 2nd Division, XVI Corps, Military Division of West Mississippi, to August 1865.

The 52nd Indiana Infantry mustered out September 10, 1865.

== Detailed service ==
February 1, 1862: Regiment raised in Rushville, Indiana

February 7, 1862: Left Rushville, Indiana for Fort Donelson, TN

February 12–16, 1862: Victory at the Battle of Fort Donelson

February 16, 1862 - April 18, 1862: Garrison at Fort Henry, TN

March 11, 1862: Action at Paris, TN with light casualties. Withdrew

April 18, 1862: Moved to Pittsburg Landing, TN in the aftermath of the Battle of Shiloh

April 29, 1862 - May 30, 1862: Advance on and sieged of the town of Corinth, TN as General Henry Halleck pursued confederate General P. G. T. Beauregard in retreat from Shilo.

June 1, 1862 - July 21, 1862: March to Memphis, Tennessee, via Grand Junction, LaGrange, and Holly Springs

June 4, 1862: During the march to Memphis, Colonel James M Smith resigned and Lt. Colonel Edward H. Wolfe assumed command

July 22, 1862 - September 1, 1862: Duty at Memphis, TN

September 2, 1862: Action near Memphis, TN

September 17, 1862: Durhamsville

September 30, 1862, to January 18, 1863: Garrison duty at Fort Pillow, Tennessee, and operations against guerrillas in Tennessee and Arkansas .

September 19–25, 1863: Expedition to Jackson, MS (as a detachment)

September 28, 1863 - October 5, 1863: Expedition to Covington, Durhamsville, and Fort Randolph

November 21, 1863 – November 22, 1863: Scout from Fort Pillow

January 18, 1864: Ordered to Vicksburg, Mississippi

February 3, 1864 - March 2, 1864: Meridian Campaign

February 5, 1864: Clinton

February 14–15, 1864: Meridian, MS

March 1864 - April 1864: Veterans absent on furlough

March 4, 1864: Left Vicksburg, MS

March 17, 1864: Return to Rushville, IN

April 23, 1864: Left for the field

April 26, 1864: Reached Columbus, Kentucky

Moved to Morganza, Louisiana

Moved to Vicksburg, MS

Non-veterans temporarily attached to the 89th Indiana Infantry.

March 10, 1864 - May 22, 1864: Red River Campaign

March 14, 1864: Fort DeRussy

March 21, 1864: Bayou Rapides

April 9, 1864: Battle of Pleasant Hill

April 23, 1864: Cane River Crossing

April 26, 1864 - May 13, 1864: At Alexandria, LA

May 3, 1864: Moore's Plantation

May 6, 1864: Bayou LeMourie

May 13–20, 1864: Retreat to Morganza, MS

May 16, 1864: Mansura

May 18, 1864: Yellow Bayou

May 20-June 10: Moved to Vicksburg, Mississippi then to Memphis, Tennessee,

June 6–7, 1864: Lake Chicot, Arkansas

June 23, 1864: Colliersville, Tennessee

June 23, 1864: Near Lafayetteville

July 5–21, 1864: Smith's Expedition to Tupelo, MS

July 11–12, 1864: About Pontotoc

July 14–15, 1864: Harrisburg, Tupelo, MS

July 15, 1864: Old Town (or Tishomingo) Creek

August 1, 1864 – August 30, 1864: Smith's Expedition to Oxford, Mississippi

September 26, 1864 -November 19, 1864: March through Missouri in pursuit of Price

November 26-December 1, 1864: Moved to Nashville, Tennessee

December 15–16, 1864: Victory at the Battle of Nashville

December 17–23, 1864: Pursuit of Hood to the Tennessee River

December 24, 1864 - February 1865: Duty at Clifton, Tennessee, and Eastport, Mississippi

February 6–17: Moved to New Orleans, LA

March 17-April 12, 1865: Campaign against Mobile and its defenses

March 26, 1865 - April 8, 1865: Siege of Spanish Fort and Fort Blakely

April 9, 1865: Assault and capture of Fort Blakely April 9

April 12, 1865: Occupation of Mobile, Alabama

April 13–25, 1865: Moved to Montgomery, Alabama

April 25, 1865 - July 14, 1865: Duty at Montgomery, AL

May 25, 1865: Troops from the disbanded 50th Indiana Infantry Regiment joined the regiment

July 15, 1865 - August 28, 1865: At Tuskegee, Alabama

September 10, 1865: Regiment mustered out of service and all troops discharged

September 21, 1865: The surviving veterans of the 50th Infantry returned home to Seymour, Indiana

== Casualties ==
The regiment lost a total of 205 men during service; 2 officers and 26 enlisted men killed or mortally wounded, 2 officers and 175 enlisted men died of disease.

== Commanders ==
- Colonel James M. Smith - resigned June 4, 1862
- Colonel Edward H. Wolfe
- Lieutenant Colonel Zalmon S. Main - commanded during the Battle of Nashville and the Mobile Campaign
- Captain W. L. Guard - commanded during the Siege of Corinth

== See also ==
- List of Indiana Civil War regiments
- Indiana in the Civil War
