= Edward J. Stackpole =

American military officer and author

Edward J. Stackpole Jr.
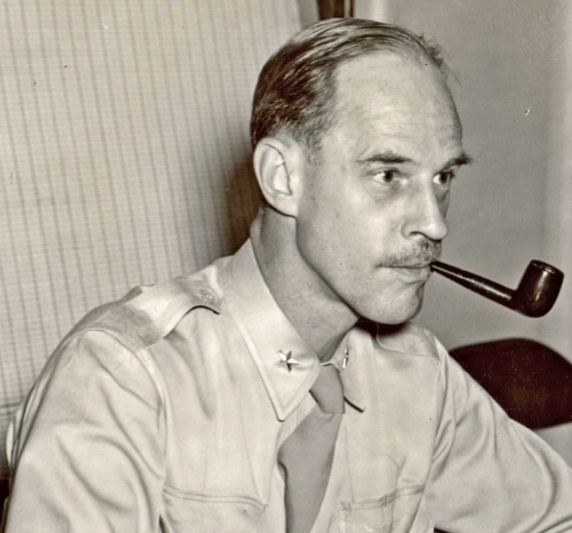
- Stackpole, c. 1941
- Born: June 21, 1894; Harrisburg, Pennsylvania, U.S.
- Died: October 1, 1967 (aged 73); Harrisburg, Pennsylvania, U.S.
- Burial place: Harrisburg Cemetery, Harrisburg, Pennsylvania, U.S.
- Education: Yale University (BA, 1915)
- Military career
- Allegiance: United States; Pennsylvania
- Service: United States Army; Pennsylvania National Guard
- Service years: 1916–1947
- Rank: Major General (National Guard); Lieutenant General (Retired list)
- Service number: 0171837
- Unit: U.S. Army Cavalry Branch
- Commands: Company M, 110th Infantry Regiment; 8th Infantry Regiment; 104th Cavalry Regiment; 52nd Cavalry Brigade; 22nd Cavalry Division; 56th Infantry Brigade; Panama Security Command; 28th Infantry Division; Pennsylvania Army National Guard
- Wars: World War I World War II
- Awards: Distinguished Service Cross; Legion of Merit; Purple Heart (3)
- Other work: Newspaper publisher Book publisher Author

Edward J. Stackpole Jr. (June 21, 1894 – October 1, 1967) was an American newspaper publisher, businessman, author and military officer from Harrisburg, Pennsylvania. A veteran of World War I and World War II, he attained the rank of major general, and was a recipient of the Distinguished Service Cross, Legion of Merit, and Purple Heart with two oak leaf clusters.

Stackpole was a native of Harrisburg, and was raised and educated in Harrisburg. He attended Harrisburg Academy and graduated from Yale University in 1915. After attending Citizens' Military Training Camps in 1915 and 1916, in 1917 he received his commission as a second lieutenant. He served with the Pennsylvania National Guard's 110th Infantry Regiment during the First World War, and received the Distinguished Service Cross and three awards of the Purple Heart. He continued to rise through the ranks of the National Guard and attained the rank of brigadier general in 1933, and major general in 1940. During the interwar years, his command assignments included the 104th Cavalry Regiment, 52nd Cavalry Brigade, and 22nd Cavalry Division.

During the Second World War, Stackpole accepted reduction in rank to brigadier general to enter active duty, and commanded the 56th Infantry Brigade, a unit of the 28th Infantry Division. Stackpole was subsequently assigned to lead the Panama Security Command, which staffed and managed early warning stations on the Atlantic and Pacific sides of the Panama Canal to guard the canal from attack by the Axis powers. He later performed special duty on the War Department staff, and his wartime service was recognized with award of the Legion of Merit. After the war, he commanded the 28th Infantry Division during its reorganization as a Pennsylvania National Guard unit, and was again promoted to major general. He retired from the military in 1947, and in 1956 was promoted to lieutenant general on Pennsylvania's retired list.

In his civilian career, Stackpole was president of the Telegraph Press, which published the Harrisburg Telegraph. He was also president of the Stackpole Company, a book publishing firm, WHP Radio, and the Military Service Publishing Company, a publisher of military texts and training manuals. He was a director of American Aviation Publications, the Harrisburg Trust Company, the Harrisburg Hotel Company, and the Penn-Harris Hotel Company. As a civic activist, Stackpole was president of the board of trustees of the Pennsylvania School for Children of Veterans, and a member of the board of the Harrisburg Hospital and the Pennsylvania Chamber of Commerce.

Stackpole was also an author who specialized in historical works about the American Civil War. He died in Harrisburg on October 1, 1967. Stackpole was buried at Harrisburg Cemetery in Harrisburg.

== Early life and education ==
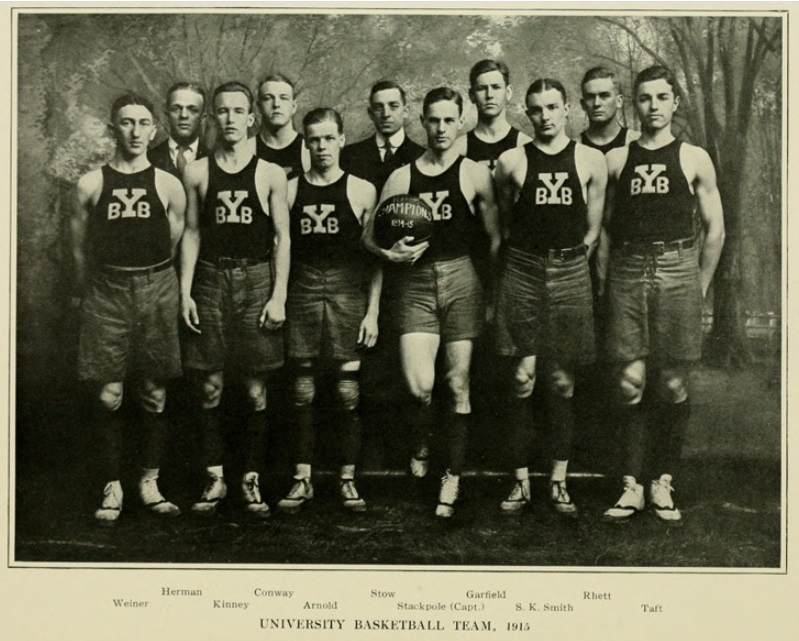
The 1915 Yale University basketball team with Stackpole in the center, holding the ball

Stackpole was born in Harrisburg, Pennsylvania on June 21, 1894, the son of Edward J. Stackpole (1861–1936), who published the Harrisburg Telegraph, and Maria Kate (Hummel) Stackpole. He was raised and educated in Harrisburg, and attended Harrisburg's Harrisburg Academy. He attended Yale University from 1911 to 1915, and graduated with a Bachelor of Arts degree. While at Yale, Stackpole was a member of the glee club, captain of the basketball team, and a member of the Alpha Delta Phi fraternity.

== Career ==
After graduating, Stackpole was employed in the business office of the Harrisburg Telegraph. In 1915 and 1916, he attended the Citizens' Military Training Camps that were conducted at Plattsburgh Barracks, New York. As the United States prepared to enter World War I, among the activities in which Stackpole participated was publicizing Brooklyn schoolgirl Marjorie Sterrett's efforts to raise small donations for construction of a new United States Navy battleship. The fund, which eventually grew to over twenty thousand dollars (about five hundred thousand dollars in 2023) was raised from over twenty thousand subscribers during 1915 and 1916. It was donated to the navy in 1917, and was used to award cash prizes during naval artillery gun crew competitions.

=== Military career ===
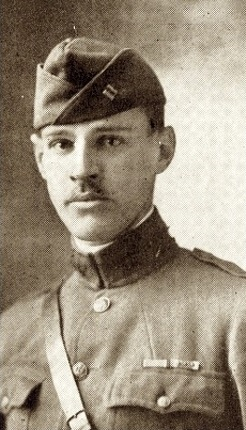
Stackpole as a captain in 1918

In May 1917, Stackpole received a commission as a second lieutenant of Infantry and completed his initial officer's training at Madison Barracks, New York. He was promoted to captain in August 1917. The Pennsylvania National Guard's 28th Division undertook mobilization and training at Fort Dix, New Jersey and Camp Hancock, Georgia, and Stackpole served on the division staff as bayonet training officer.

Stackpole was later assigned to command the 28th Division's Company M, 110th Infantry Regiment. He took part in several campaigns, including Champagne-Marne, Aisne-Marne, Oise-Aisne, and Meuse-Argonne. Stackpole was slightly wounded on August 2, 1918, and severely wounded in the back and leg on August 24. On September 5, he was medically evacuated to Paris to recuperate, and he returned to the United States in December 1918. For his heroism, he received three awards of the Purple Heart and the Silver Star, which was later upgraded to the Distinguished Service Cross.

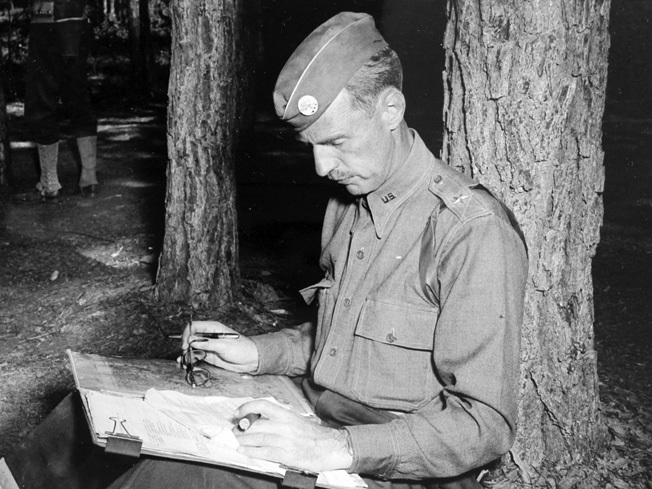
Stackpole commanding 56th Brigade, 28th Infantry Division, during 1941 U.S. Army maneuvers

After recovering from his wounds at Walter Reed Army Medical Center, Stackpole was discharged from active duty in January 1921. He resumed his National Guard career, and in 1920 was commissioned as a colonel and assigned to command the 8th Infantry Regiment. In 1922, the regiment was reorganized as the 104th Cavalry. Stackpole attended the Cavalry School Officers' Course in 1928. In June 1933, he was promoted to brigadier general as commander of the 52nd Cavalry Brigade. In February 1940, he was promoted to major general and assigned to command the 22nd Cavalry Division.

In September 1940, the Army determined that it would not employ traditional mounted cavalry divisions during World War II and the 22nd Cavalry Division was disbanded. Later in September, Brigadier General Charles B. Smathers, commander of the 56th Infantry Brigade, retired from the military, and he died in October. In November, Stackpole was assigned to command the brigade, and he requested reduction to brigadier general in January 1941 so he could remain in command after it was federalized for wartime service. The triangular division organization the Army began to field in the National Guard in 1942 did not require brigade headquarters, so Stackpole was subsequently assigned to the Caribbean Defense Command. He was then appointed to lead the Panama Security Command (PSC). The PSC protected the Panama Canal by constructing, manning, and managing several early warning stations on both the Atlantic and Pacific sides of the canal to guard against an attack by the Axis powers.

In March 1943, Stackpole was assigned to special duty with the general staff at the War Department, and he was subsequently named chairman of the War Department Manpower Board's Seventh Section in Omaha, Nebraska. The War Department Manpower Board was responsible for personnel needs during the war, including balancing requirements for uniformed military members and civilian workers to handle production of wartime materiel. In addition, the board made policy recommendations for the return of discharged service members to the post-war work force. Stackpole remained on active duty until December 1945. He received the Legion of Merit to commend his wartime service.

In March 1946, Stackpole was assigned to command the Pennsylvania National Guard's 28th Infantry Division. Promoted again to major general, Stackpole led the division during its post-World War II reorganization. With the creation of the Air National Guard after World War II, the National Guard was reorganized into the Army National Guard and Air National Guard. The National Guard in each state restructured to field the new component, and in May 1947, Stackpole was appointed to command the Pennsylvania Army National Guard. In July 1947, he retired from the military. His service to the Pennsylvania National Guard was recognized with award of the Pennsylvania Distinguished Service Medal, and in 1956 his commendable service to the National Guard was further recognized when he was promoted to lieutenant general on Pennsylvania's retired list.

==== Distinguished Service Cross citation ====
The President of the United States of America, authorized by Act of Congress, July 9, 1918, takes pleasure in presenting the Distinguished Service Cross to Captain (Infantry) Edward J. Stackpole Jr., United States Army, for extraordinary heroism in action while serving with 110th Infantry Regiment, 28th Division, A.E.F., near Baslieux, France, 24 August 1918. Directed to advance to a new position, Captain Stackpole led his men forward with great gallantry. Although painfully wounded in the back and leg by shell fragments, he remained on duty with his men, inspiring them by his courage and coolness to hold a difficult position against repeated attacks by the enemy in force for a period of twenty-four hours.

Service: Army Rank: Captain Orders: War Department, General Orders 71 (1919)

== Civilian career ==
=== Publisher and businessman ===
Stackpole was president of the Telegraph Press, which published the Harrisburg Telegraph. In addition, he was president of a book publishing firm, the Stackpole Company. His publishing ventures also included serving as president of the Military Service Publishing Company, which published military training manuals and textbooks. Stackpole was also a director of American Aviation Publications, and served as the company's secretary-treasurer.

Stackpole was the longtime president of Harrisburg's WHP Radio. In addition, he served on the board of directors of the Harrisburg Trust Company, Harrisburg Hotel Company, and Penn-Harris Hotel Company.

=== Author ===
Stackpole was an author and lecturer who specialized in the history of the American Civil War. Among his published works were:

- Chancellorsville: Lee's Greatest Battle
- They Met at Gettysburg
- Drama on the Rappahannock: The Fredericksburg Campaign
- From Cedar Mountain to Antietam
- Sheridan in the Shenandoah: Jubal Early's Nemesis

Stackpole's work as an author and historian was recognized in 1961 when he received the honorary degree of Doctor of Literature from Gettysburg College.

=== Civic and fraternal ===
Stackpole served as president of the board of trustees for the Pennsylvania School for Children of Veterans. In addition, he was a member of the board of directors for the Harrisburg Hospital and the Pennsylvania Chamber of Commerce. He was also a Freemason and a member of the Market Square Presbyterian Church in Harrisburg.

Stackpole served as treasurer of the Pennsylvania National Guard Association for three terms after World War I, and in 1929 was elected the association's president. He was also an active member of the American Legion, Legion of Valor, and Veterans of Foreign Wars. In addition to his civic memberships, Stackpole was a member of Harrisburg's University Club, the Harrisburg Club, and the Country Club of Harrisburg.

== Death ==
On October 1, 1967, following an extended illness, Stackpole died in Harrisburg, Pennsylvania, at age 73. He was buried at Harrisburg Cemetery in Harrisburg.

== Family ==
In 1917, Stackpole married Frances Bailey. She died in 1948, and Stackpole did not remarry. The Stackpoles were the parents of one child who survived to adulthood: daughter Mary Frances "Frankie" Stackpole (1923–2011) was the wife of Meade D. Detweiler III.

Stackpole's brother Albert (1897–1971) was involved in many of the same publishing and business ventures. He was also a longtime member of the National Guard and United States Army Reserve who attained the rank of major general as commander of the 79th Infantry Division. A veteran of World War I, World War II, and the Korean War, Albert H. Stackpole was a recipient of the Legion of Merit and the Bronze Star Medal.
