= 103rd Cavalry Regiment =

- Active: 1921–1940
- Country: United States
- Allegiance: Pennsylvania
- Branch: Pennsylvania Army National Guard
- Motto(s): Scatter Come Together
- Branch color: Yellow

The 103rd Cavalry Regiment was a unit of the Pennsylvania National Guard that existed from 1921 to 1940, when it was re-designated the 190th Field Artillery Regiment.

The regiment was constituted in 1921 from the 1st Pennsylvania Cavalry Regiment and had its headquarters in Philadelphia and later Tyrone. The regiment was assigned to the 21st Cavalry Division. The 103rd Cavalry provided relief assistance during floods in 1936. During 1937–1938, Maurice Rose was a regular army instructor to the 103rd Cavalry. The regiment was relieved from the 21st Cavalry Division and assigned to the 22nd Cavalry Division in January 1939. On 23 September 1940, the regiment was converted to the 190th F.A. Regiment.
