= 21st Cavalry Division =

- Shoulder Sleeve Insignia
- Active: 1921–1940
- Country: United States of America
- Branch: United States Army National Guard
- Type: Cavalry
- Size: Division
- Garrison/HQ: New York City, New York

The United States Army's 21st Cavalry Division was a cavalry division of the National Guard with units located primarily in the northeastern United States. The division was created from the perceived need for additional cavalry units after the First World War. It numbered in succession of the Regular Army divisions, which were not all active at its creation.

== History ==
The 21st Cavalry Division was constituted in the National Guard in 1921, originally allotted to the states of New York, Pennsylvania, New Jersey, and Virginia; and assigned to the First Army. From 1922 to 1938, the division’s subordinate units generally held separate summer camps at locations within their respective states: the 51st Cavalry Brigade at Pine Camp, New York, for New York units; the 102nd Cavalry at the New Jersey National Guard camp at Sea Girt; the 52nd Cavalry Brigade at the Pennsylvania National Guard's camps at Mount Gretna, 1921–35 and Indiantown Gap Military Reservation, 1936–40. The 52nd held its first full brigade camp in 1923, during which the Pennsylvania cavalrymen held a brigade review for General John J. Pershing. The 51st held its first full brigade camp in June 1928 when the 121st Cavalry participated for the first time. Staggered camps were the rule of thumb for both brigades. This meant that one regiment would be followed immediately by the second so that the horses of both regiments could be pooled to mount an entire regiment. In that period of tight budgets, National Guard cavalry troops were authorized only half the number of horses (32) than that of men (about 65) per troop. The brigade headquarters would arrive for the last week of the first regiment, and remain for the first week of the second regiment. This allowed the brigade commander and his staff to work with both regiments to discern the strengths and weaknesses of his units.

In March 1925, plans were developed to assemble the entire 21st Cavalry Division at Sea Girt for maneuvers. The plan never came to fruition, however, due to a lack of money and the idea was not pursued again until the late 1930s. Although the division headquarters was not officially formed until 1940, the combined staffs of the 51st and 52nd Brigades formed the division headquarters in a provisional status for First Army command post exercises (CPXs) on several occasions. The staffs participated in the CPXs at Camp Dix, New Jersey, in 1931 and 1934, at Fort Devens, Massachusetts, in 1936, and in the I Cavalry Corps CPX at Fort Knox in 1934. Although the 21st Cavalry Division did not participate in the First Army maneuvers in 1935, 1939, and 1940, several of its subordinate units did. The 101st Cavalry participated in the 1939 maneuver and the 21st Reconnaissance Squadron participated in the 1940 maneuver, but as the “eyes and ears” of the 22nd Cavalry Division instead. The primary reason that the 21st did not play a part in those major maneuvers was that it did not have a staff organized, nor a commander appointed, until the summer of 1940. This state of affairs was due, in part, to the failure of the representative states’ adjutants general to agree on the division’s final allotments.

The division was reorganized in the fall of 1938 when the 52nd Cavalry Brigade was reassigned to the 22nd Cavalry Division and New Jersey’s separate 59th Cavalry Brigade was assigned to the 21st in its stead. Also that fall, the Secretary of War authorized the various states to begin final negotiations for the formation of the headquarters of the remaining three National Guard cavalry divisions, less the 24th, which was already organized. Final allotments were made in January 1939 and the division headquarters, less several staff positions, were allotted to the state of New York. The Secretary of War authorized the formation of the 21st Cavalry Division on 30 April 1940 and the division headquarters was organized and federally recognized on 5 July 1940, making it the last National Guard cavalry division to be formed. On that date, Major General Nathaniel H. Egleston (formerly the commander, 51st Cavalry Brigade) was appointed division commander. However, only three months later the division was directed to be broken up. The 21st was inactivated on 1 October 1940 and disbanded on 1 November 1940. The division staff personnel were reassigned to the serve as the brigade staff for the 102nd Coast Artillery Brigade (Anti-Aircraft) and the Headquarters Battery was staffed by personnel from the division headquarters troop and the 51st Cavalry Brigade. Major General Egleston gave up command of the 21st and assumed command of the 102nd on 5 September 1940.

== Organization ==
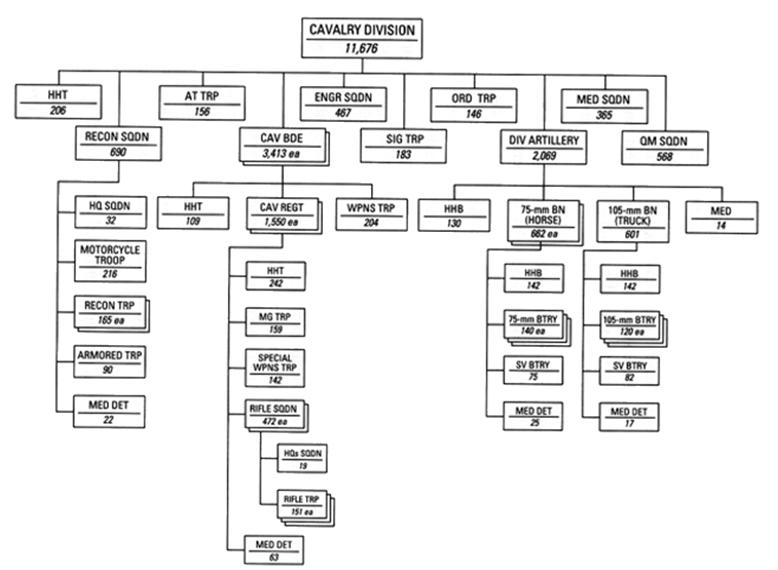
Standard organization chart for a Cavalry Division in November 1940

- Headquarters, New York City, New York
  - Headquarters Troop, West New Brighton, New York
- 51st Cavalry Brigade, New York
  - Headquarters Troop, Staten Island, New York
  - 101st Cavalry Regiment (New York National Guard), Brooklyn, New York
  - 121st Cavalry Regiment (New York National Guard), Rochester, New York
- 59th Cavalry Brigade, Newark, New Jersey
  - Headquarters Troop, Newark, New Jersey
  - 102d Cavalry Regiment (New Jersey National Guard), Newark, New Jersey
  - 110th Cavalry Regiment (Massachusetts National Guard), Boston, Massachusetts
- 112th Field Artillery Regiment, Trenton, New Jersey
- Headquarters Special Troops, West New Brighton, New York
  - 21st Signal Troop, West New Brighton, New York
  - 125th Ordnance Company, (Medium), Connecticut
  - 21st Tank Company (Light), New York
  - 21st Reconnaissance Squadron, Boston, Massachusetts
  - 125th Engineer Squadron, New York
  - 121st Medical Squadron, New York
  - 121st Quartermaster Squadron, Boston, Massachusetts

== Disbandment ==
Pre-war United States Army planning did not contemplate the use of National Guard or Organized Reserve cavalry divisions in wartime. After the disbandment of the National Guard cavalry divisions, former division units either remained intact and separate, were absorbed by other units, were converted to units of other arms, or were disbanded. The 21st Cavalry Division was inactivated on 1 October 1940 and disbanded on 1 November 1940.

Reorganization of former 21st Cavalry Division units
Unit	Reorganized as
Headquarters	Disbanded 30 September 1940
Headquarters, Special Troops	Disbanded 30 September 1940
Headquarters Troop	Disbanded 30 September 1940
21st Signal Troop	Disbanded 30 September 1940
125th Ordnance Company (Medium)	Disbanded 30 September 1940
21st Tank Company (Light)	Disbanded 30 September 1940
51st Cavalry Brigade	Headquarters disbanded 1 November 1940. Headquarters Troop converted and redesignated as Headquarters Battery, 102nd Coast Artillery Brigade 1 October 1940
101st Cavalry Regiment	Reorganized and redesignated as 101st Cavalry (Horse-Mechanized) 1 October 1940 and relieved from division
121st Cavalry Regiment	Relieved on 30 September 1940 and elements used to form the 101st Antitank Battalion, 102nd Separate Battalion, Coast Artillery (Antiaircraft), and part of the 209th Coast Artillery Regiment (Antiaircraft).
59th Cavalry Brigade	Headquarters consolidated with state staff, New York National Guard in September 1940. Headquarters Troop consolidated with Headquarters Troop, 102nd Cavalry 1 October 1940
102nd Cavalry Regiment	Relieved on 1 October 1940 and reorganized and redesignated as 102nd Cavalry (Horse-Mechanized) 16 November 1940
110th Cavalry Regiment	Relieved on 9 October 1940 and converted and redesignated as the 180th Field Artillery Regiment
21st Reconnaissance Squadron	Disbanded 30 September 1940
112th Field Artillery Regiment	Relieved from division 1 October 1940
125th Engineer Squadron	Disbanded 1 November 1940
121st Medical Squadron	Disbanded 1 November 1940
121st Quartermaster Squadron	Inactivated 1 October 1940 and disbanded

== See also ==
- United States Army branch insignia
- List of armored and cavalry regiments of the United States Army
- Headquarters Troop, 51st Cavalry Brigade Armory
- New York Army National Guard Heraldry
