= 52nd Brigade =

52nd Brigade or 52nd Infantry Brigade may refer to:

== British India ==
- 52nd Indian Brigade of the British Indian Army in the First World War

== China ==
- 52nd Mountain Motorized Infantry Brigade (People's Republic of China)

== Ukraine ==
- 52nd Separate Mechanized Brigade

== United Kingdom ==
- 52nd Infantry Brigade (United Kingdom)
- 52nd Light Anti-Aircraft Brigade, a British Army formation, 1939–1944

=== Artillery units ===
- 52 (London) Anti-Aircraft Brigade, the post-World War II redesignation of 26th (London) Anti-Aircraft Brigade
- 52nd (London) Anti-Aircraft Brigade, Royal Garrison Artillery, the original title of 52nd (London) Heavy Anti-Aircraft Regiment, Royal Artillery
- 52nd (Kent) Medium Brigade, Royal Garrison Artillery
- 52nd (Manchester) Brigade, Royal Field Artillery

== United States ==
- 52nd Air Defense Artillery Brigade
- 52nd Cavalry Brigade

== See also ==
- 52nd Division (disambiguation)
- 52nd Regiment (disambiguation)
