= 22nd Cavalry Division (United States) =

- Active: 1925 – 1930; 1940
- Disbanded: 1 November 1940
- Country: United States of America
- Branch: United States Army National Guard
- Type: Cavalry
- Size: Division
- Garrison/HQ: Cleveland, Ohio

The United States Army's 22nd Cavalry Division, part of the National Guard, was created because of the perceived need for additional cavalry units after World War I. It numbered in succession after the Regular Army divisions, which were not all active at its creation. Going into World War II, the Army's Cavalry branch contained three Regular, four National Guard, and six Organized Reserve cavalry divisions, as well as one separate cavalry brigade (the 56th, part of the Texas National Guard).

== History ==
The 22nd Cavalry Division was constituted in the National Guard in 1921, originally allotted to the states of Wisconsin, Ohio, Illinois, Michigan, Kentucky, Louisiana, and West Virginia, and assigned to the Second Army. By 1927, it had been reallotted to the states of the Fifth and Sixth Corps Areas only. The headquarters was allotted to the Wisconsin National Guard, which began appointing officers to the division staff in 1922, but it was not until 25 March 1925 that the division headquarters was federally recognized. Colonel Frank Caldwell, a Regular Army officer, was offered command, but declined, not wanting to accept a dual commission in the Wisconsin National Guard. Concurrently, Lieutenant Colonel Robert M. Beck was also offered command of the division's 53rd Cavalry Brigade, but declined for the same reason. A division commander was never appointed, and the division was headed instead by Colonel James T. Hale, the division chief of staff. In 1929, due to budget constraints, the Secretary of War directed that only brigade-level headquarters would be funded in cavalry divisions until further notice. As a result, the first headquarters of the 22nd Cavalry Division was disbanded on 30 June 1930.

During most of the period of the division's existence, training was conducted at regimental level and below. This was particularly true of the armory training period which ran roughly from August to May, and was conducted at troop level. The armory training consisted of the drills typical of National Guard units of the time. Interspersed were periods of active duty at the call of the state. Regiments, or elements thereof, were called out from time-to-time by state governors for emergencies or to establish martial law in an unruly area. The best training for units of the 22nd Cavalry Division was provided by the annual two-week summer camps. The 53rd Cavalry Brigade and 105th Cavalry conducted their camps at Camp Williams, Wisconsin, while the 106th Cavalry was split between Camp Grayling, Michigan (1st Squadron) and Camp Grant, Illinois (headquarters and 2nd Squadron). The units of the 53rd Brigade trained together for the first time in 1936 when it was assembled at Camp Williams for the Second Army maneuvers that summer. Prior to 1935, the 54th Cavalry Brigade headquarters and the 107th Cavalry trained at Camp Perry, Ohio, while the 123rd Cavalry trained at Fort Knox, Kentucky. During the summer of 1935, the 107th Cavalry came to train at Fort Knox followed immediately by the 123rd Cavalry.

The brigade headquarters overlapped the camps of the two subordinate regiments. This system was similar to that practiced by the brigades of the 21st Cavalry Division. By 1937, however, the regiments of the 54th Brigade were training at Fort Knox as the brigade made progress toward higher levels of collective training. The 22nd Cavalry Division was reorganized in February 1939 when the headquarters was withdrawn from Wisconsin and allotted to Pennsylvania. Concurrently, the 53rd Cavalry Brigade was reassigned to the 23rd Cavalry Division and Pennsylvania's 52nd Cavalry Brigade was assigned to the 22nd Division. This brigade, along with the newly activated 166th Field Artillery, 22nd Signal Troop, and 122nd Quartermaster Squadron (all from the Pennsylvania National Guard) took to the field at Indiantown Gap Military Reservation for a week in November 1939 as part of an increase in training periods directed by the War Department. These units made up over half of the division, and while the training was conducted primarily at troop- and squadron-level, the training gave many brigade officers (soon to be assigned to the new division staff) an opportunity to conduct something akin to division-level planning.

On 3 January 1940, the Headquarters, 22nd Cavalry Division, was once again federally recognized, this time at Harrisburg, Pennsylvania. Major General Edward J. Stackpole assumed command of the division. He remained in command until the division was inactivated. Two months later Stackpole assembled his new staff at Fort Bliss, Texas, to train with the staff of the 1st Cavalry Division from 10 to 12 March 1940. This training was designed to prepare the staff for the upcoming First Army maneuvers near Canton, New York, in August 1940. The training was apparently worth the effort as the 22nd Division was later able to perform well above the expectations for a brand new division. During the First Army maneuvers, the division was short one brigade because funds were not available to move the 54th Cavalry Brigade to New York. The 21st Reconnaissance Squadron (21st Cavalry Division) was attached to the division for the maneuver to replace the missing 22nd Squadron of Ohio. The final exercise of the maneuver pitted the Blue First Army (II and III Corps) against the invading Black I Corps. The 22nd Division was placed on the right flank of the First Army facing the 26th “Yankee” Division. In a typical cavalry “end-run” on the final night and day of the exercise, the cavalry units of the 22nd Division moved in behind the Yankee Division, cutting the lines of communication of its 51st Infantry Brigade. Although the performance of the 22nd Cavalry Division was quite impressive, the results were not convincing enough to save the division from the planners at GHQ. On 23 September 1940, the 22nd Cavalry Division was inactivated, and was disbanded effective 1 November 1940.

== Organization, 1940 ==
Two asterisks indicated the unit was allotted, but unorganized or inactive, with the state of headquarters allocation shown.

- Headquarters (Harrisburg, Pennsylvania)
- Headquarters, Special Troops (Harrisburg, Pennsylvania)
  - Headquarters Troop (Bloomsburg, Pennsylvania)
  - 22nd Signal Troop (Philadelphia, Pennsylvania)
  - 126th Ordnance Company (Medium) (Ohio National Guard) **
  - 22nd Tank Company (Light) (Ohio National Guard) **
- 52nd Cavalry Brigade
  - Headquarters (Harrisburg, Pennsylvania)
  - Headquarters Troop (Philadelphia, Pennsylvania)
  - 103rd Cavalry Regiment (United States) (Tyrone, Pennsylvania)
  - 104th Cavalry Regiment (United States) (Harrisburg, Pennsylvania)
- 54th Cavalry Brigade
  - Headquarters (Cleveland, Ohio)
  - Headquarters Troop (Akron, Ohio)
  - 107th Cavalry Regiment (United States) (Ohio National Guard)
  - 123rd Cavalry Regiment (Louisville, Kentucky)
- 22nd Reconnaissance Squadron (Cincinnati, Ohio)
- 166th Field Artillery Regiment (Harrisburg, Pennsylvania)
- 126th Engineer Squadron (Kentucky National Guard) **
- 122nd Medical Squadron (Pennsylvania National Guard) **
- 122nd Quartermaster Squadron (Harrisburg, Pennsylvania)

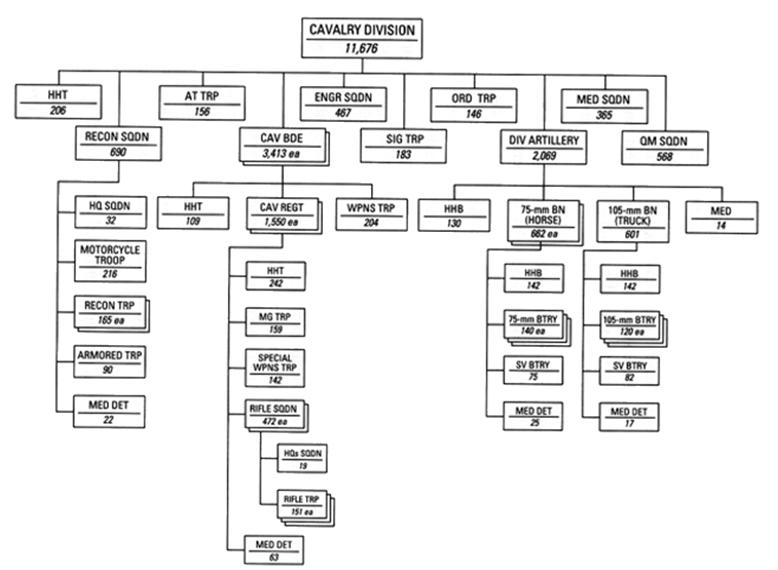
Standard organization chart for a Cavalry Division in November 1940

== See also ==
- Formations of the United States Army
- List of armored and cavalry regiments of the United States Army
- United States Army branch insignia

== Sources ==
- U.S. Army Order of Battle 1919–1941, Volume 2. The Arms: Cavalry, Field Artillery, and Coast Artillery, 1919–41 by Lieutenant Colonel (Retired) Steven E. Clay, Combat Studies Institute Press, Fort Leavenworth, KS, 2011
- Maneuver and Firepower, The Evolution of Divisions and Separate Brigades, by John B. Wilson, Center of Military History, Washington D.C., 1998
- Cavalry Regiments of the U S Army by James A. Sawicki Wyvern Pubns; June 1985
- The Trading Post, Journal of the American Society of Military Insignia Collectors, April- June 2009, pages 20 & 21
