= 52nd Cavalry Division =

- Active: 8 July 1941 – 13 March 1942
- Country: Soviet Union
- Branch: Cavalry
- Role: Breakthrough and Exploitation in Deep Operations
- Size: Division

The 52nd Cavalry Division was one of the first cavalry divisions formed after the start of the war. The unit was formed at Novocherkassk in the North Caucasus Military District likely from the reservists and cavalry depots in the district's cavalry training grounds.

== Combat service ==
The division was rushed to the front less than two weeks after being formed. It arrived in the 21st Army by the middle of July and was assigned to the Kuliev Cavalry Group under the command of the 21st Mountain Cavalry Division's commander. By August the division was assigned to the Central Front's 13th Army. The division was brushed aside by the 2nd Panzer Corps as it turned south towards Kiev in September.

When the German attack on Moscow began the division was in Bryansk Front reserves in Ermakov's Operations Group (a mixed unit of cavalry, tank brigade, motorized divisions). The group was quickly disbanded and the division was used as a mobile reserve in the 13th or 3rd Armies on the southern flank of the German advance on Tula. Assigned to the 8th Cavalry Corps on 15 January. The units assigned to the corps were so depleted upon their assignment the corps was not committed during the winter counter-offensive in 1942. On 13 March 1942 the division was officially disbanded to provide replacements and reinforcements for other units.

== Subordinate units ==
- 81st Cavalry Regiment
- 105th Cavalry Regiment
- 117th Cavalry Regiment

== See also ==
- Cavalry Divisions of the Soviet Union 1917–1945
