= 52nd Division =

In military terms, 52nd Division or 52nd Infantry Division may refer to:

== Infantry divisions ==
- 52nd Army Division (1969–1985), People's Republic of China
- 52nd Army Division (1965–1969), People's Republic of China
- 52nd Reserve Division, German Empire
- 52nd Infantry Division (German Empire)
- 52nd Infantry Division (Wehrmacht), Germany
- 52nd Infantry Division "Torino", Italy
- 52nd Division (Imperial Japanese Army)
- 52nd Infantry Division (Russian Empire)
- 52nd Rifle Division (RSFSR), Russian Red Army
- 52nd Infantry Division (South Korea)
- 52nd Motor Rifle Division, Soviet Union
- 52nd Riga-Berlin Guards Rifle Division, Soviet Union
- 52nd Rifle Division (Soviet Union, 1935–1941)
- 52nd Rifle Division (Soviet Union, 1942–1946)
- 52nd Rifle Division (Soviet Union, 1955–1957), later the 52nd Motor Rifle Division
- 52nd (Lowland) Infantry Division, United Kingdom
- 52nd Infantry Division (United States)

== Other divisions ==
- 52nd Engineer Division, People's Republic of China
- 52nd Cavalry Division, Soviet Union
- 52nd Rocket Division, Soviet Union

== See also ==
- List of military divisions by number
- 52nd Brigade (disambiguation)
- 52nd Regiment (disambiguation)
- 52nd Squadron (disambiguation)
