= 52nd Regiment =

52nd Regiment may refer to:

- 52nd (London) Heavy Anti-Aircraft Regiment, Royal Artillery
- 52nd (Oxfordshire) Regiment of Foot
- 52nd Air Defense Artillery Regiment
- 52nd Armoured Regiment (India)
- 52nd Artillery Regiment "Torino"
- 52nd Aviation Regiment (United States)
- 52nd Heavy Bomber Aviation Regiment, Russia
- 52nd Illinois Infantry Regiment
- 52nd Indiana Infantry Regiment
- 52nd Infantry Regiment (United States)
- 52nd Infantry Regiment (Philippines)
- 52nd Infantry Regiment (Russian Empire)
- 52nd Infantry Regiment "Alpi"
- 52nd Lowland Volunteers
- 52nd Ohio Infantry
- 52nd Pennsylvania Infantry Regiment
- 52nd Regiment Kentucky Volunteer Mounted Infantry
- 52nd Tennessee Infantry Regiment

== See also ==
- 52nd Division (disambiguation)
